= List of songs recorded by Huey Lewis and the News =

The following is a list of all songs recorded by Huey Lewis and the News.

- The table lists each song title by Huey Lewis and the News, the songwriters for each song, the album or soundtrack on which the song first appeared, and the year in which the song was released.

== Songs ==
Name of song, writer(s), album(s), and year released.
Song	Writer(s)	Album	Year	Ref(s)
"100 Years from Now"	Marcel East; Nathan East; Huey Lewis	Time Flies... The Best of Huey Lewis & the News	1996	
"Attitude"	M. Carl	Hard at Play	1991	
"Back in Time"	Johnny Colla; Chris Hayes; Sean Hopper; Huey Lewis	Back to the Future: Music from the Motion Picture Soundtrack	1985	
"Bad Is Bad"	Alex Call; John Ciambotti; Sean Hopper; Huey Lewis; John McFee; Michael Schriener	Sports	1983	
"Best of Me"	Bonnie Hayes; Kevin Hayes; Annie Stocking	Hard at Play	1991	
"Better Be True"	Johnny Colla; Huey Lewis	Small World	1988	
"Better to Have and Not Need"	Don Covay; Erskin Watts	Four Chords & Several Years Ago	1994	
"Blue Monday"	Dave Bartholomew; Fats Domino	Four Chords & Several Years Ago	1994	
"Bobo Tempo"	John Ciambotti; Sean Hopper; Huey Lewis	Small World	1988	
"Build Me Up"	Johnny Colla; Huey Lewis	Hard at Play	1991	
"But It's Alright"	J.J. Jackson; Pierre Tubbs	Four Chords & Several Years Ago	1994	
"Buzz Buzz Buzz"	Robert Byrd; John Gray	Picture This	1982	
"Change of Heart"	Chris Hayes; Huey Lewis	Picture This	1982	
"Couple Days Off"	Chris Hayes; Huey Lewis; G. Palmer	Hard at Play	1991	
"Cry to Me"	Bert Russell	Soulsville	2010	
"Do You Believe in Love"	Robert John "Mutt" Lange	Picture This	1982	
"Do You Love Me, or What?"	Chris Hayes; Huey Lewis; Nick Lowe	Hard at Play	1991	
"Doing It All for My Baby"	Phil Cody; Mike Duke	Fore!	1986	
"Don't Ever Tell Me That You Love Me"	Mario Cipollina; Johnny Colla; Bill Gibson; Chris Hayes; Sean Hopper; Huey Lewis	Huey Lewis and the News	1980	
"Don't Fight It"	Steve Cropper; Wilson Pickett	Soulsville	2010	
"Don't Let the Green Grass Fool You"	Jerry Akines; Johnnie Bellmon; Reginald Turner; Victor Drayton	Soulsville	2010	
"Don't Look Back"	D. Fredericks; Bill Gibson; Huey Lewis	Hard at Play	1991	
"Don't Make Me Do It"	Mario Cipollina; Johnny Colla; Bill Gibson; Chris Hayes; Sean Hopper; Huey Lewis	Huey Lewis and the News	1980	
"Exodisco"	Ernest Gold	Exodisco / Kick Back (as American Express)	1979	
"Finally Found a Home"	Bob Brown; Chris Hayes; Huey Lewis	Sports	1983	
"Flip, Flop & Fly"	Charles E. Calhoun; Lou Willie Turner	"But It's Alright" single (B-side)	1994	
"Forest for the Trees"	Jerome Fletcher; Bill Gibson; Huey Lewis	Fore!	1986	
"Free"	Don Davis; Lamar Thomas	Soulsville	2010	
"Function at the Junction"	Edward Holland, Jr.; Shorty Long	Four Chords & Several Years Ago	1994	
"Give Me the Keys (And I'll Drive You Crazy)"	Bill Gibson; Huey Lewis; Steven Chino Lewis	Small World	1988	
"Going Down Slow"	Jimmy Oden	Four Chords & Several Years Ago	1994	
"Good Morning Little School Girl"	John Lee Williamson	Four Chords & Several Years Ago	1994	
"Got to Get You Off My Mind"	Dolores Burke; Solomon Burke; J.B. Moore	Soulsville	2010	
"Grab This Thing"	Steve Cropper; Alvertis Isbell	Soulsville	2010	
"He Don't Know"	Don Covay; Jon Tiven; Sally Tiven	Hard at Play	1991	
"Heart and Soul"	Mike Chapman; Nicky Chinn	Sports	1983	
"The Heart of Rock & Roll"	Johnny Colla; Huey Lewis	Sports	1983	
"Hearts"	Mario Cipollina; Johnny Colla; Bill Gibson; Chris Hayes; Sean Hopper; Huey Lewis	Huey Lewis and the News	1980	
"Her Love Is Killin' Me"	Johnny Colla; Chris Hayes; Huey Lewis	Weather	2019	
"Hip to Be Square"	Bill Gibson; Sean Hopper; Huey Lewis	Fore!	1986	
"Honky Tonk Blues"	Hank Williams	Sports	1983	
"Hope You Love Me Like You Say You Do"	Mike Duke	Picture This	1982	
"Hurry Back Baby"	Bill Gibson; Huey Lewis	Weather	2019	
"I Ain't Perfect"	Bill Gibson; Huey Lewis	Plan B	2001	
"I Am There for You"	Johnny Colla; Huey Lewis	Weather	2019	
"I Know What I Like"	Chris Hayes; Huey Lewis	Fore!	1986	
"I Never Think About You"	Chris Hayes; Huey Lewis; John Pierce	Plan B	2001	
"I Never Walk Alone"	Reed Nielsen	Fore!	1986	
"I Want a New Drug"	Chris Hayes; Huey Lewis	Sports	1983	
"I Want To (Do Everything for You)"	Joe Tex	Soulsville	2010	
"I Want You"	Brian Marnell	Huey Lewis and the News	1980	
"If This Is It"	Johnny Colla; Huey Lewis	Sports	1983	
"If You Gotta Make a Fool of Somebody"	Rudy Clark	Four Chords & Several Years Ago	1994	
"If You Really Love Me You'll Let Me"	Mario Cipollina; Johnny Colla; Bill Gibson; Chris Hayes; Sean Hopper; Huey Lewis	Huey Lewis and the News	1980	
"I'm Not in Love Yet"	Chris Hayes; Huey Lewis	Plan B	2001	
"Is It Me"	Chris Hayes; Sean Hopper; Huey Lewis	Picture This	1982	
"It Hit Me Like a Hammer"	Robert John "Mutt" Lange; Huey Lewis	Hard at Play	1991	
"It's All Right"	Curtis Mayfield	People Get Ready (Curtis Mayfield tribute album)	1993	
"Jacob's Ladder"	Bruce Hornsby; John Hornsby	Fore!	1986	
"Just One More Day"	Steve Cropper; Otis Redding; McEvoy Robinson	Soulsville	2010	
"Just the One (I've Been Looking For)"	Steve Cropper; Eddie Floyd; Alvertis Isbell	Soulsville	2010	
"Kick Back"	Sean Hopper; Huey Lewis	Exodisco / Kick Back (as American Express)	1979	
"Let Her Go and Start Over"	Mike Duke	Plan B	2001	
"Little Bitty Pretty One"	Robert Byrd	Four Chords & Several Years Ago	1994	
"Little Sally Walker"	Rufus Thomas	Soulsville	2010	
"Mother in Law"	Allen Toussaint	Four Chords & Several Years Ago	1994	
"My Other Woman"	Johnny Colla; Huey Lewis	Plan B	2001	
"Naturally"	Johnny Colla; Huey Lewis	Fore!	1986	
"Never Found a Girl"	Eddie Floyd; Alvertis Isbell; Booker T. Jones Jr.	Soulsville	2010	
"Never Like This Before"	Isaac Hayes; Booker T. Jones Jr.; David Porter	Soulsville	2010	
"Now Here's You"	Mario Cipollina; Johnny Colla; Bill Gibson; Chris Hayes; Sean Hopper; Huey Lewis; John McFee	Huey Lewis and the News	1980	
"Old Antone's"	Johnny Colla; Huey Lewis	Small World	1988	
"One of the Boys"	Johnny Colla; James Harrah; Huey Lewis	Weather	2019	
"The Only One"	Johnny Colla; Bill Gibson; Huey Lewis	Picture This	1982	
"Perfect World"	Alex Call	Small World	1988	
"Pineapple Express"	Johnny Colla; David Fredericks; Huey Lewis	Pineapple Express: Original Motion Picture Soundtrack	2008	
"Plan B"	Johnny Colla; Huey Lewis	Plan B	2001	
"The Power of Love"	Johnny Colla; Chris Hayes; Huey Lewis	Back to the Future: Music from the Motion Picture Soundtrack	1985	
"Pretty Girls Everywhere"	Eugene Church; Thomas Williams	Weather	2019	
"Remind Me Why I Love You Again"	Johnny Colla; Bill Gibson; Chris Hayes; Huey Lewis	Weather	2019	
"Respect Yourself"	Luther Ingram; Mack Rice	Soulsville	2010	
"The Rhythm Ranch"	Johnny Colla; Huey Lewis	Plan B	2001	
"Searching for My Love"	Robert Moore	Four Chords & Several Years Ago	1994	
"Shake, Rattle and Roll"	Charles E. Calhoun	Four Chords & Several Years Ago	1994	
"She Shot a Hole in My Soul"	Mac Gayden; Chuck Neese	Four Chords & Several Years Ago	1994	
"(She's) Some Kind of Wonderful"	John Ellison	Four Chords & Several Years Ago	1994	
"Simple as That"	Frank Biner; Emilio Castillo; Stephen Kupka	Fore!	1986	
"Slammin'"	Greg Adams; Chris Hayes; Geoffrey Palmer	Small World	1988	
"Small World" (Part One)	Chris Hayes; Huey Lewis	Small World	1988	
"Small World" (Part Two)	Chris Hayes; Huey Lewis	Small World	1988	
"So Little Kindness"	Chris Hayes; Huey Lewis; Rob Sudduth	Time Flies... The Best of Huey Lewis & the News	1996	
"So Little Kindness"	Chris Hayes; Huey Lewis; Rob Sudduth	Plan B (re-recording)	2001	
"Some of My Lies Are True (Sooner or Later)"	Mario Cipollina; Johnny Colla; Bill Gibson; Chris Hayes; Sean Hopper; Huey Lewis	Huey Lewis and the News	1980	
"Soulsville"	Isaac Hayes	Soulsville	2010	
"Stagger Lee"	Harold Logan; Lloyd Price	Four Chords & Several Years Ago	1994	
"Stop Trying"	Mario Cipollina; Johnny Colla; Bill Gibson; Chris Hayes; Sean Hopper; Huey Lewis	Huey Lewis and the News	1980	
"Stuck with You"	Chris Hayes; Huey Lewis	Fore!	1986	
"Surely I Love You"	James Bracken; Marion Oliver	Four Chords & Several Years Ago	1994	
"Tattoo (Giving It All Up for Love)"	Phil Lynott	Picture This	1982	
"Tell Me a Little Lie"	Johnny Colla; Huey Lewis	Picture This	1982	
"Thank You #19"	Sean Hopper; Huey Lewis	Plan B	2001	
"That's Not Me"	Michael Ruff	Hard at Play	1991	
"'Til the Day After"	Steve Carter; Sean Hopper; Joe White	Time Flies... The Best of Huey Lewis & the News	1996	
"Time Ain't Money"	Johnny Colla; Huey Lewis	Hard at Play	1991	
"Trouble in Paradise"	Mario Cipollina; Johnny Colla; Bill Gibson; Chris Hayes; Sean Hopper; Huey Lewis	Huey Lewis and the News	1980	
"Um, Um, Um, Um, Um, Um" (Note: Recorded live in Chico, California, in 2004)	Curtis Mayfield	Live at 25 DVD	2005	
"Walking on a Thin Line"	Andre Pessis; Kevin Wells	Sports	1983	
"Walking with the Kid"	Chris Hayes; Huey Lewis; Geoffrey Palmer	Small World	1988	
"We Should Be Making Love"	Andy Goldmark; Steve Kipner; Steve Lindsey	Hard at Play	1991	
"We're Not Here for a Long Time (We're Here for a Good Time)"	Johnny Colla; Chris Hayes; Huey Lewis	Plan B	2001	
"Whatever Happened to True Love"	Johnny Colla; Huey Lewis	Picture This	1982	
"When I Write the Book"	Billy Bremner; Dave Edmunds; Nick Lowe	Plan B	2001	
"When the Time Has Come"	Chris Hayes; Huey Lewis	Time Flies... The Best of Huey Lewis & the News	1996	
"While We're Young"	Johnny Colla; Huey Lewis; John Pierce	Weather	2019	
"Who Cares?"	Mario Cipollina; Johnny Colla; Bill Gibson; Chris Hayes; Sean Hopper; Huey Lewis	Huey Lewis and the News	1980	
"Whole Lotta Lovin'"	Johnny Colla; Huey Lewis	Fore!	1986	
"Winter Wonderland"	Felix Bernard; Richard B. Smith	Fan club release	1984	
"Workin' for a Livin'"	Chris Hayes; Huey Lewis	Picture This	1982	
"World to Me"	Chris Hayes; Huey Lewis	Small World	1988	
"You Crack Me Up"	Mario Cipollina; Huey Lewis	Sports	1983	
"You Left the Water Running'	Oscar Franks; Rick Hall; Dan Penn	Four Chords & Several Years Ago	1994	
"Your Cash Ain't Nothin' But Trash"	Charles E. Calhoun	Four Chords & Several Years Ago	1994	
