= Huey Lewis and the News discography =

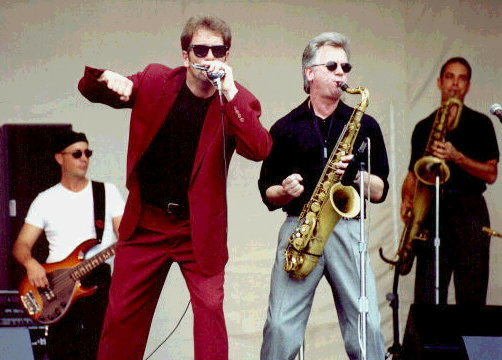
- Huey Lewis and the News performing live in 2006.
- Studio albums: 10
- Live albums: 1
- Compilation albums: 3
- Singles: 39

This article presents the discography for the American band Huey Lewis and the News. Huey Lewis and the News have sold over 30 million albums worldwide and are ranked in the top 200 selling groups of all time by the Recording Industry Association of America.

Three of their albums, Sports, Fore!, and Small World have been certified platinum (which in the United States market is equivalent to one million units sold). Sports is the band's best selling album, having been certified 7× platinum. Picture This and Hard at Play have both been certified gold. The band has released 37 singles, of which 12 have reached the top ten, and three have reached number one on the Billboard Hot 100.

The band has also appeared on two soundtrack albums. For the 1985 film, Back to the Future, the band contributed two songs. "The Power of Love" became their first number-one hit, and "Back in Time" received radio airplay on album-oriented rock stations. More than 20 years later, the band contributed the title track to the 2008 film Pineapple Express, appearing over the end credits.

The band has released three compilation albums. The first one, released worldwide (except in the U.S.), peaked at number 23 on the UK chart. The second one, Time Flies... The Best of Huey Lewis & the News was released in the U.S. only and included four newly recorded tracks. The third one was a career-spanning "greatest hits" album that included some harder-to-find tracks and was certified gold. The band has also released one live album.

== Albums ==
=== Studio albums ===
Year	Album details	Peak chart positions										Certifications (sales threshold)
Year	Album details	US	US Indie	US R&B	AUS	CAN	NOR	NZ	SWE	SWI	UK	Certifications (sales threshold)
1980	Huey Lewis and the News: Release date: June 25, 1980; Label: Chrysalis	—	—	—	—	—	—	—	—	—	—	
1982	Picture This: Release date: January 29, 1982; Label: Chrysalis	13	—	—	75	—	—	—	—	—	—	RIAA: Gold
1983	Sports: Release date: September 15, 1983; Label: Chrysalis	1	—	—	22	3	6	19	40	—	23	RIAA: 7× Platinum; BPI: Gold; MC: Diamond
1986	Fore!: Release date: August 20, 1986; Label: Chrysalis	1	—	—	3	1	6	1	7	4	8	RIAA: 3× Platinum; BPI: 2× Platinum; BVMI: Gold; MC: 3× Platinum
1988	Small World: Release date: June 1988; Label: Chrysalis	11	—	—	21	7	12	28	14	10	12	RIAA: Platinum; BPI: Gold
1991	Hard at Play: Release date: May 7, 1991; Label: EMI USA	27	—	—	61	20	—	26	25	9	39	RIAA: Gold; MC: Gold
1994	Four Chords & Several Years Ago: Release date: May 10, 1994; Label: Elektra	55	—	—	—	—	—	—	—	21	—	
2001	Plan B: Release date: May 1, 2001; Label: Silvertone	165	—	—	—	22	22	—	—	—	—	
2010	Soulsville: Release date: October 18, 2010; Label: W.O.W.	121	15	18	—	—	—	—	—	—	—	
2020	Weather: Release date: February 14, 2020; Label: BMG	71	7	—	—	—	—	—	—	13	—	
"—" denotes releases that did not chart or not released to that country

=== Compilation albums ===
Year	Album details	Peak chart positions						Certifications (sales threshold)
Year	Album details	US	AUS	CAN	NZ	SWI	UK	Certifications (sales threshold)
1992	The Heart of Rock & Roll – The Best of Huey Lewis and The News: Release date: 1992; Label: Chrysalis/Capitol	—	23	—	3	39	23	BPI: Silver
1996	Time Flies... The Best of Huey Lewis & the News: Release date: October 29, 1996; Label: Elektra	185	—	—	—	—	—	
2006	Greatest Hits & Videos: Release date: May 23, 2006; Label: Capitol	61	—	99	8	—	—	RIAA: Gold; BPI: Silver
"—" denotes releases that did not chart or not released to that country

=== Live albums ===
Year	Album details
2005	Live at 25: Release date: May 17, 2005; Label: Rhino

== Singles ==
Year	Single	Peak chart positions										Certifications (sales thresholds)	Album
Year	Single	US	US Rock	US Dance	AUS	CAN	GER	NL	NZ	SWI	UK	Certifications (sales thresholds)	Album
1979	"Exo-Disco"/"Kick Back" (as American Express)	—	—	—	—	—	—	—	—	—	—		non-album single
1980	"Some of My Lies Are True (Sooner or Later)"	—	—	—	—	—	—	—	—	—	—		Huey Lewis and the News
1980	"Now Here's You"	—	—	—	—	—	—	—	—	—	—		Huey Lewis and the News
1982	"Do You Believe in Love"	7	12	—	18	14	—	—	36	—	9 (Note: "Do You Believe in Love" peaked at No. 9 after being issued as a double A-side with "The Power of Love" in March 1986.)		Picture This
1982	"Hope You Love Me Like You Say You Do"	36	—	—	—	—	—	—	—	—	—		Picture This
1982	"Tattoo (Giving It All Up for Love)" (UK only)	—	—	—	—	—	—	—	—	—	—		Picture This
1982	"Workin' for a Livin'"	41	20	—	—	—	—	—	—	—	—		Picture This
1983	"Heart and Soul"	8	1	—	25	12	39	41	41	—	61		Sports
1984	"I Want a New Drug"	6	7	1	27	6	27	—	10	27	—	RIAA: Gold; MC: Gold	Sports
1984	"The Heart of Rock & Roll"	6	5	—	58	8	71	—	21	—	49 (Note: "The Heart of Rock & Roll" had originally peaked at No. 78 in July 1984. It peaked at No. 49 after being re-released in May 1986.)		Sports
1984	"If This Is It"	6	3	—	20	6	—	—	37	—	39		Sports
1984	"Finally Found a Home"	—	41	—	—	—	—	—	—	—	—		Sports
1984	"Walking on a Thin Line"	18	16	—	70	40	—	—	—	—	—		Sports
1985	"The Power of Love"	1	1	22	1	1	16	25	3	11	9 (Note: "The Power of Love" had originally peaked at No. 11 in September 1985. It peaked at No. 9 after being issued as a double A-side with "Do You Believe in Love" in March 1986.)	RIAA: Gold; BPI: Platinum; MC: Gold; RMNZ: 2× Platinum	Back to the Future: Music from the Motion Picture Soundtrack
1985	"Back in Time"	—	3	—	—	—	—	—	—	—	—		Back to the Future: Music from the Motion Picture Soundtrack
1986	"Stuck with You"	1	2	—	2	1	15	21	2	14	12	MC: Gold; RMNZ: Platinum	Fore!
1986	"Hip to Be Square"	3	1	—	17	14	—	28	9	—	41	RMNZ: Gold	Fore!
1986	"Whole Lotta Lovin'"	—	38	—	—	—	—	—	—	—	—		Fore!
1987	"Jacob's Ladder"	1	10	—	48	16	65	—	50	—	—		Fore!
1987	"I Know What I Like"	9	25	—	—	30	—	—	—	—	—		Fore!
1987	"Simple as That" (UK & JP)	—	—	—	—	—	—	—	—	—	47		Fore!
1987	"Doing It All for My Baby"	6	—	—	—	30	—	—	—	—	93		Fore!
1988	"Perfect World"	3	5	—	22	1	—	64	43	—	48		Small World
1988	"Small World (Part One)"	25	28	—	—	17	—	—	—	—	—		Small World
1989	"Give Me the Keys (And I'll Drive You Crazy)"	47	—	—	—	61	—	—	—	—	—		Small World
1989	"World to Me"	—	—	—	113	—	—	—	—	—	84		Small World
1989	"Walking with the Kid"	—	47	—	—	—	—	—	—	—	98		Small World
1991	"Couple Days Off"	11	3	—	40	4	40	17	24	—	98		Hard at Play
1991	"It Hit Me Like a Hammer"	21	—	—	106	9	51	—	—	—	83		Hard at Play
1991	"He Don't Know"	—	—	—	—	—	59	—	—	18	—		Hard at Play
1991	"Build Me Up"	—	27	—	—	—	—	—	—	—	—		Hard at Play
1993	"It's Alright" (B-side only)	— (Note: "It's Alright" was ineligible for the Hot 100 but did reach No. 37 on the Hot 100 Airplay chart in August 1993. In North America, the song was not released on a single, in other territories, as B-side only, to "(She's) Some Kind of Wonderful".)	—	—	—	25	—	—	—	—	—		People Get Ready – A Tribute to Curtis Mayfield
1994	"(She's) Some Kind of Wonderful"	44	—	—	—	37	51	—	—	—	84		Four Chords & Several Years Ago
1994	"But It's Alright"	54	—	—	35	32	—	—	—	—	—		Four Chords & Several Years Ago
1995	"Little Bitty Pretty One"	—	—	—	—	48	—	—	—	—	—		Four Chords & Several Years Ago
1996	"100 Years from Now"	—	—	—	—	43	—	—	—	—	—		Time Flies...
2001	"Let Her Go and Start Over"	—	—	—	—	—	—	—	—	—	—		Plan B
2001	"I'm Not in Love Yet" (with Wynonna Judd)	—	—	—	—	—	—	—	—	—	—		Plan B
2019	"Her Love Is Killin' Me"	—	—	—	—	—	—	—	—	—	—		Weather
2019	"While We're Young"	—	—	—	—	—	—	—	—	—	—		Weather
"—" denotes releases that did not chart or not released to that country

== Video releases ==
Year	Title	Label
1985	Huey Lewis & the News – The Heart of Rock 'n' Roll	Warner Home Video
1985	Video Hits	CBS/Fox Video
1987	Fore & More	CBS/Fox Video
1987	All the Way Live	Toshiba EMI
1994	Four Chords & Several Years Ago: The Concert	Warner Music Vision
2000	Live at Rockpalast	Encore Music Entertainment
2005	Live at 25	Rhino Home Video
2006	Greatest Hits & Videos	Capitol

== Other appearances ==
Year	Song	Album
1985	"Trouble in Paradise" (live version)	We Are the World
1985	"Back in Time", "Power of Love"	Back to the Future (soundtrack)
1988	"Are You with Me"	Indestructible (The Four Tops album)
1994	"Heart of Rock 'N Roll" (live version)	Grammy's Greatest Moments Volume II
2008	"Pineapple Express"	Pineapple Express (soundtrack)
2018	"While We're Young"	Animal Crackers (soundtrack)
