= Greatest Hits & Videos =

Greatest hits album by Huey Lewis and the News
- Released: May 23, 2006
- Recorded: 1981–2000
- Genre: Rock
- Label: Capitol

Huey Lewis and the News chronology
Live at 25 (2005)	Greatest Hits & Videos (2006)	Soulsville (2010)

Greatest Hits cover

Professional ratings
Review scores
Source	Rating
AllMusic	4.5/5 stars

Greatest Hits & Videos is a greatest hits album by Huey Lewis and the News, released on May 23, 2006. It contains the band's most popular songs and music videos. The compilation is a follow-up to the band's previous greatest hits compilation, Time Flies... The Best of Huey Lewis & the News from the previous decade.

A version without the DVD was released as Greatest Hits with different cover artwork.

== Track listing ==
=== CD ===
1. "The Heart of Rock & Roll" (Johnny Colla, Huey Lewis)
2. "I Want a New Drug" (Chris Hayes, Lewis)
3. "The Power of Love" (from the Back to the Future soundtrack) (Hayes, Lewis, Colla)
4. "Jacob's Ladder" (Bruce Hornsby, John Hornsby)
5. "Stuck with You" (Hayes, Lewis)
6. "Doing It All for My Baby" (Mike Duke, Phil Cody)
7. "If This Is It" (Colla, Lewis)
8. "Do You Believe in Love" (Robert John "Mutt" Lange)
9. "Heart and Soul" (Mike Chapman, Nicky Chinn)
10. "Back in Time" (from the Back to the Future soundtrack) (Colla, Hayes, Sean Hopper, Lewis)
11. "Perfect World" (Alex Call)
12. "I Know What I Like" (Hayes, Lewis)
13. "Trouble in Paradise" (from the We Are the World album - live in San Francisco 2/21/85) (Colla, Bill Gibson, Hayes, Hopper, Lewis, Mario Cipollina)
14. "It's All Right" (from the Curtis Mayfield tribute album People Get Ready) (Mayfield)
15. "Cruisin'" (Huey Lewis duet with Gwyneth Paltrow, from the Duets soundtrack) (Smokey Robinson, Marv Tarplin)
16. "Hope You Love Me Like You Say You Do" (Duke)
17. "Small World" (featuring Stan Getz) (Hayes, Lewis)
18. "But It's Alright" (J.J. Jackson, Pierre Tubbs)
19. "Hip to Be Square" (Gibson, Hopper, Lewis)
20. "Couple Days Off" (Hayes, Lewis, Geoffrey Palmer)
21. "Workin' for a Livin'" (Hayes, Lewis)

=== DVD ===
1. "Do You Believe in Love" (previously unreleased)
2. "Heart and Soul"
3. "I Want a New Drug"
4. "The Heart of Rock & Roll"
5. "If This Is It"
6. "Bad Is Bad"
7. "The Power of Love"
8. "Stuck with You"
9. "Doing It All for My Baby" (original long version)
10. "Workin' for a Livin'" (live at the Country Club, Reseda, CA, 4/29/82)

== Charts ==
Chart (2011)	Peak position
US Billboard 200	61
Chart (2016)	Peak position
New Zealand Albums (RMNZ)	8
Chart (2025)	Peak position
Greek Albums (IFPI)	12

== Certifications ==
Region	Certification	Certified units/sales
United Kingdom (BPI)	Silver	60,000^{‡}
United States (RIAA)	Platinum	1,000,000^{^}
^{^} Shipments figures based on certification alone.^{‡} Sales+streaming figures based on certification alone.
