= Tribute This! =

- Directed by: Mick McCleery
- Produced by: Gary Joseph, Mike Nicholson
- Starring: Billy Franks, Gary Joseph, Mick McCleery, Mike Nicholson
- Music by: Billy Franks
- Release date: July 24, 2008 (VIA festival)
- Running time: 89 minutes
- Country: United States
- Language: English
- Budget: $100,000

Tribute This! is a 2008 documentary film directed by Mick McCleery and produced by Gary Joseph and Mike Nicholson. The subject of the film is British singer/songwriter Billy Franks (former frontman for the London 1980s band The Faith Brothers).

The film follows the real life, five-country trek that McCleery, Joseph and Nicholson took, along with Franks as they tried to track down ten famous singers (Huey Lewis, Bruce Springsteen, Elvis Costello, Steve Earle, Aaron Neville, Rod Stewart, Tom Petty, Jon Bon Jovi, Bryan Adams and Paul McCartney) and ask them if they each would be willing to record a track for a tribute album to the mostly unknown Franks, a fellow songwriter who has given his life to his craft but is still an unknown. All proceeds from the album being earmarked for the UK music charity Youth Music.

Although the film is mostly a comedy road trip it also explores the deeper issues of the arbitrary nature of celebrity, the lifelong pursuit of dreams and just how important friendships can be.

== Awards ==
The film won "Best Music documentary" at the 2008 Bare Bones Film Festival.
