= Four Chords & Several Years Ago =

Studio album by Huey Lewis and the News
- Released: May 10, 1994
- Recorded: October 1993–February 1994
- Studios: The Site (San Rafael, California); Studio D Recording (Sausalito, California)
- Genres: Rock, R&B
- Length: 48:52
- Label: Elektra
- Producer: Stewart Levine

Huey Lewis and the News chronology
Hard at Play (1991)	Four Chords & Several Years Ago (1994)	Time Flies... The Best of Huey Lewis & the News (1996)

Singles from Four Chords & Several Years Ago
- 1. "(She's) Some Kind of Wonderful" Released: April 1994; 2. "But It's Alright" Released: August 1994; 3. "Little Bitty Pretty One" Released: January 1995

Professional ratings
Review scores
Source	Rating
AllMusic	2/5 stars

Four Chords & Several Years Ago is the seventh album by American rock band Huey Lewis and the News, released in 1994. The title is a play on the first sentence in Abraham Lincoln's Gettysburg Address ("Four score and seven years ago ..."). The album is a collection of 1950s and 1960s rhythm & blues covers influential to the members of the group during their early years. It is the last album to feature founding member and bassist, Mario Cipollina, who left the band after the subsequent tour.

== Track listing ==
No.	Title	Writer(s)	Original artist	Length
1.	"Shake, Rattle and Roll"	Charles E. Calhoun	Big Joe Turner	3:07
2.	"Blue Monday"	Dave Bartholomew; Fats Domino	Fats Domino	2:41
3.	"Searching for My Love"	Bobby Moore	Bobby Moore & the Rhythm Aces	2:50
4.	"(She's) Some Kind of Wonderful"	John Ellison	Soul Brothers Six	3:06
5.	"But It's Alright"	J. J. Jackson; Pierre Tubbs	J. J. Jackson	2:54
6.	"If You Gotta Make a Fool of Somebody"	Rudy Clark	James Ray	2:32
7.	"Mother in Law"	Allen Toussaint	Ernie K-Doe	2:43
8.	"Little Bitty Pretty One"	Robert Byrd	Thurston Harris and the Sharps	2:04
9.	"Good Morning Little School Girl"	Sonny Boy Williamson	Sonny Boy Williamson I	4:02
10.	"Stagger Lee"	Harold Logan; Lloyd Price	Lloyd Price	2:36
11.	"She Shot a Hole in My Soul"	Mac Gayden; Chuck Neese	Clifford Curry	2:38
12.	"Surely I Love You"	James Bracken; Marion Oliver	Rosco Gordon	2:51
13.	"You Left the Water Running"	Oscar Franck; Rick Hall; Dan Penn	Otis Redding	3:06
14.	"Your Cash Ain't Nothin' But Trash"	Charles E. Calhoun	The Clovers	2:57
15.	"Function at the Junction"	Edward Holland Jr.; Shorty Long	Shorty Long	3:13
16.	"Better to Have and Not Need"	Don Covay; Erskin Watts	Don Covay	3:32
17.	"Going Down Slow"	James B. Oden	St. Louis Jimmy Oden	2:00
Total length:				48:52

== Personnel ==
Huey Lewis & the News

- Huey Lewis – lead vocals, harmonica
- Mario Cipollina – bass
- Johnny Colla – rhythm guitar, saxophone, backing vocals
- Bill Gibson – drums, percussion, backing vocals
- Chris Hayes – lead guitar, backing vocals
- Sean Hopper – keyboards, backing vocals

Additional personnel

- Marvin McFadden – trumpet (4–7, 10, 11, 13)
- Linda Tillery – backing vocals (4, 6, 10, 11, 15, 16)
- Jeanie Tracy – backing vocals (4, 6, 10, 11, 15, 16)

== Production ==
- Producer – Stewart Levine
- Executive producer – Bob Brown
- Engineer – Daren Klein
- Assistant engineers – Jim Champagne, Kevin Scott and Jim "Watts" Vereecke
- Recorded at The Site (San Rafael, California) and Studio D Recording (Sausalito, California)
- Mixed by Daren Klein at Ocean Way Recording (Hollywood, California)
- Mastered by Bernie Grundman at Bernie Grundman Mastering (Hollywood, California)
- Technicians – Ralph Arista and Jim Moran
- Art direction – Robin Lynch
- Design – JoDee Stringham
- Photography – Dennis Keeley
- Management – Bob Brown Management

== Charts ==
Chart (1994)	Peak position
European Top 100 Albums	61
German Albums (Offizielle Top 100)	46
Japanese Albums (Oricon)	19
Japanese International Albums (Oricon)	2
Swiss Albums (Schweizer Hitparade)	21
US Billboard 200	55

Singles - Billboard (United States)

Year	Single	Chart	Position
1994	"(She's) Some Kind of Wonderful"	Adult Contemporary	7
1994	"(She's) Some Kind of Wonderful"	The Billboard Hot 100	44
1994	"But It's Alright"	Adult Contemporary	5
1994	"But It's Alright"	The Billboard Hot 100	54
1995	"Little Bitty Pretty One"	Adult Contemporary	27
