= Soulsville (Huey Lewis and the News album) =

Studio album by Huey Lewis and the News
- Released: October 18, 2010
- Recorded: 2010
- Studios: Ardent Studios (Memphis, TN); Way Out West Recording (San Rafael, California); Morningside Studios (San Anselmo, California)
- Genre: Soul
- Length: 43:36
- Label: W.O.W.
- Producers: Jim Gaines; Huey Lewis and the News

Huey Lewis and the News chronology
Greatest Hits & Videos (2006)	Soulsville (2010)	Weather (2020)

Soulsville is the ninth studio album from Huey Lewis and the News and the band's first since Plan B in 2001. The album was released on October 18, 2010, in the United Kingdom and Europe and November 2, 2010, in the United States. The album, a tribute to the artists and music of Stax Records, was the brainchild of the band's manager, Bob Brown. As lead singer Huey Lewis explained, "the public isn't clamoring for new Huey Lewis & the News material". Brown and the band decided "it would be cooler to go into the [Stax] catalog a little deeper and find songs that people hadn't heard and capture them faithfully". This album features new guitarists Stef Burns and Bill Hinds and baritone saxophonist Johnnie Bamont, replacing Chris Hayes and the late Ron Stallings.

== Recording ==
Lewis and the News recorded Soulsville at Ardent Studios in Memphis, Tennessee, in early 2010. Two California studios were also used: Morningside Studio in San Anselmo and Way Out West Recording in San Rafael. One of the original Stax co-engineers, Jim Gaines, who also engineered the band's best-selling albums, Sports and Fore!, produced the album with the band.

== Reception ==
Professional ratings
Review scores
Source	Rating
AllMusic	3.5/5 stars
American Songwriter	3.5/5 stars
The A.V. Club	D+
SoulTracks	Highly Recommended

Stephen Thomas Erlewine of AllMusic writes, "what makes the album successful is that Huey Lewis & the News don't choose the obvious tunes", citing that their love for the music is infectious and the album "winds up like a bunch of old friends having fun revisiting their favorite tunes." Rick Moore of American Songwriter also praises the selection of "songs that are a little more obscure", calling it "a solid collection of 14 tunes from the Stax/Volt heyday" and a nice homage by the News. J. Matthew Cobb of SoulTracks thinks the song selections are a perfect fit for Lewis's voice and show how rich and vast the Stax catalog is, calling the album "one of the most aesthetically sound cover albums of 2010". Jason Heller of The A.V. Club completely disagrees by claiming Soulsville doesn't have soul and only a few of the songs rise "above the level of really good karaoke." He rips Lewis' renditions of Solomon Burke's (who died shortly before the album was released) "Got to Get You Off My Mind" and "Cry to Me", describing it as "a pathetic epitaph for the late King of Rock & Soul."

== Track listing ==
Soulsville track listing
No.	Title	Writer(s)	Length
1.	"Don't Fight It"	Steve Cropper, Wilson Pickett	2:57
2.	"Got to Get You Off My Mind"	Dolores Burke, Solomon Burke, J.B. Moore	2:50
3.	"Free"	Alana Davis, Ed Tuton	3:53
4.	"Respect Yourself" (duet with Dorothy Combs Morrison)	Luther Ingram, Mack Rice	3:41
5.	"Cry to Me"	Bert Russell	2:59
6.	"Just One More Day"	Cropper, Otis Redding, McEvoy Robinson	3:25
7.	"Never Found a Girl"	Eddie Floyd, Alvertis Isbell, Booker T. Jones	2:53
8.	"Soulsville"	Isaac Hayes	3:37
9.	"Little Sally Walker"	Rufus Thomas	2:11
10.	"I Want To (Do Everything for You)"	Joe Tex	3:13
11.	"Just the One (I've Been Looking For)"	Cropper, Floyd, Isbell	2:55
12.	"Don't Let the Green Grass Fool You"	Jerry Akines, Johnnie Bellmon, Reginald Turner, Victor Drayton	2:51
13.	"Never Like This Before"	Hayes, Jones, David Porter	2:57
14.	"Grab This Thing"	Cropper, Isbell	3:14

== Album cover ==
The album cover was designed by Memphis folk artist Lamar Sorrento. It presents a caricature of a Memphis street corner, complete with musicians, rib joints, and WDIA, the country's first black radio station.

== Chart performance ==
Chart (2010)	Peak position
US Billboard 200	121
US Top R&B/Hip-Hop Albums (Billboard)	18
US Top Independent Albums (Billboard)	15

== Personnel ==
=== Huey Lewis and the News ===
- Huey Lewis – lead vocals, harmonica
- Stef Burns – guitar, backing vocals
- Bill Hinds – guitar, backing vocals
- Johnny Colla – guitar, tenor saxophone, percussion, backing vocals, arrangements
- John Pierce – bass
- Bill Gibson – drums, percussion, backing vocals
- Sean Hopper – keyboards, backing vocals

=== The Sports Section ===
- Marvin McFadden – trumpet
- Rob Sudduth – tenor saxophone
- Johnnie Bamont – alto saxophone, baritone saxophone, flute

Additional musicians

- Rick Steff – acoustic piano (1, 12)
- John Gove – trombone (2, 4)

Additional vocalists

- Bertram Brown – backing vocals (1, 2, 9, 12, 13)
- Jackie Johnson – backing vocals (1–4, 9, 12, 13)
- Reba Russell – backing vocals (1–4, 9, 12, 13)
- Daunielle "Pie" Hill – backing vocals (3, 4)
- Dorothy Combs Morrison – vocal duet (4)
- Larry Batiste – backing vocals (5, 7, 11)
- Bryan Dyer – backing vocals (5, 10)
- Niko Ellison – backing vocals (5, 7, 10, 11)
- Claytoven Richardson – backing vocals (5, 7, 10, 11)
- Ashling Cole – backing vocals (8)
- Sandy Griffith – backing vocals (8)

=== Production ===
- Huey Lewis and the News – producer
- Jim Gaines – producer, engineer, mixing
- Bob Brown – executive producer, manager
- Curry Weber – engineer, remixes
- Vadim Canby – additional engineer
- Johnny Colla – additional engineer, musical arrangements and director
- Lydia Gilman – assistant engineer
- Lamar Sorrento – cover art
- Neko Studios – graphic design
- Huey Lewis – liner notes

Studios

- Recorded at Ardent Studios (Memphis, Tennessee).
- Additional recording at Way Out West Recording (San Rafael, California) and Morningside Studios (San Anselmo, California).
- Mastered at L. Nix Mastering (Memphis, Tennessee).
