= Little Bitty Pretty One =

1957 song written by Bobby Day

Single by Thurston Harris and the Sharps
- B-side: "I Hope You Won't Hold It Against Me"
- Released: September 1957
- Genre: Doo-wop
- Length: 2:22
- Label: Aladdin
- Songwriter: Bobby Day

"Little Bitty Pretty One" is a 1957 song written and originally recorded by Bobby Day. That same year, the song was popularized by Thurston Harris. Produced by Aladdin Records (located in Los Angeles, Calif.), and featuring the Sharps on backing vocals, Harris' version reached No. 6 on the U.S. Billboard Best-Sellers chart and No. 2 on the R&B chart. The Bobby Day version reached No. 11 in the Canadian CHUM Chart.

In 1991, Jacqueline Byrd, the widow of songwriter Bobby Day, told lawmakers that she had intercepted a letter addressed to her husband. The letter stated that the copyright to "Little Bitty Pretty One" was not renewed, thus ending royalty payments to Day and the song's publisher. Byrd never told her husband, who was dying of cancer, about the letter. If the song's copyright were renewed, Byrd and her four children would have received royalty payments until 2037.

"Little Bitty Pretty One"

Single by The Jackson 5

from the album Lookin' Through the Windows
- B-side: "If I Have to Move a Mountain" (US); "Maybe Tomorrow" (UK)
- Released: April 4, 1972
- Recorded: 1972
- Studio: Motown
- Genre: R&B
- Length: 2:22
- Label: Motown
- Songwriter: Bobby Day
- Producers: Mel Larson, Jerry Marcellino

The Jackson 5 singles chronology
"Sugar Daddy" (1971)	"Little Bitty Pretty One" (1972)	"Lookin' Through the Windows" (1972)

== Reception ==
Bryan Thomas writes that the song "has gone on to become one of the best loved oldies of the late '50s".

The song is famous for its hummed opening. It was used in the 1983 horror film Christine, the 1989 comedy/fantasy film Little Monsters, and the 1996 comedy/fantasy film Matilda.

== Cover versions ==
A MIDI cover of the song

- Frankie Lymon reached No. 58 on the Billboard Hot 100 chart in 1960.
- Clyde McPhatter returned it to the top 40 in the US, when his recording peaked at No. 25 on the Hot 100 in 1962.
- The Dave Clark 5 covered it in 1965 on their US Top 25 "Weekend in London" album
- Wayne Cochran covered it in 1967
- In 1972, the Jackson 5 included it on their album, Lookin' Through the Windows, and took the song to No. 13 on the Hot 100. Record World praised the performance.
- Screamin' Jay Hawkins covered it in 1979.
- Cliff Richard, in 1983 on his Silver album.
- In 1994, Huey Lewis and the News did their take for their album Four Chords & Several Years Ago.
- Billy Gilman did a cover in it and included it on his One Voice album in 2000.
- Aaron Carter performed "Little Bitty Pretty One" for the 2001 Disney movie The Princess Diaries.
- Fall Out Boy used an interpolation on the song "So Good Right Now" on their 2023 album So Much (for) Stardust.
- The Doobie Brothers played this song many times in their concerts going back to their inception, but eventually released two versions of the song. The first was in 2000 for their box set "Long Train Runnin': 1970–2000" which was also included as a bonus track on the Japan edition of Sibling Rivalry. They released a live version in 2004 on their live album Live at Wolf Trap.
- Deadbolt included the song as a hidden track on their 2001 album Hobo Babylon.

== "Wiggle, Wiggle" ==
"Little Bitty Pretty One" was the inspiration for the Accents' sole hit "Wiggle Wiggle" in 1958, and though the similarities were evidently not sufficient to warrant a lawsuit, Aladdin Records took the expedient step of covering the song with a group called the Chestnuts.
