= Huey Lewis and the News (album) =

Studio album by Huey Lewis and the News
- Released: 1980
- Recorded: December 1979
- Studios: American Recording (Studio City), Redwing Sound (Los Angeles, California)
- Genres: Rock, new wave
- Length: 31:28
- Label: Chrysalis
- Producer: Bill Schnee

Huey Lewis and the News chronology
Huey Lewis and the News (1980)	Picture This (1982)

Singles from Huey Lewis and the News
- 1. "Some of My Lies Are True (Sooner or Later)" Released: 1980; 2. "Now Here's You" Released: 1980

Huey Lewis and the News is the debut studio album by American rock band Huey Lewis and the News, released in 1980.

== Background ==
In 1979, the band's name was Huey Lewis and the American Express. Under this name they released a single and secured their recording contract with Chrysalis Records at the end of the year. The album was recorded within three weeks and the producer was Bill Schnee, who had produced for Boz Scaggs and Pablo Cruise.

Chrysalis did not like the addition 'American Express' to the band's name, fearing that the credit card company of the same name could sue them. In January 1980, the band changed their name to 'Huey Lewis and the News'.

The album reached No. 203 on the Billboard album chart. Prior to the album's release, the track "Who Cares?" was used in the 1979 motion picture Rock 'n' Roll High School.

== Reception ==
Professional ratings
Review scores
Source	Rating
AllMusic	4/5 stars
Billboard	favorable

Billboard states that producer Bill Schnee mastered the "clean, sparse rock" that every rock band was trying to achieve at the time by "skinning the uptempo, light rockers down to basic guitars and vocals." In a retrospective review for AllMusic, Stephen Thomas Erlewine says the News turn out "hard-driving covers and originals in a workmanlike fashion" but their "debut suffers from an uneven selection of material."

Record World called the lead single "Some of My Lies Are True (Sooner or Later)" a "fun rocker" in which "the driving rhythm guitars buttress strong lead and harmony vocals."

== Track listing ==
All tracks are written by Huey Lewis and the News, except where noted.

Side one
No.	Title	Writer(s)	Length
1.	"Some of My Lies Are True (Sooner or Later)"		3:23
2.	"Don't Make Me Do It"		2:55
3.	"Stop Trying"		3:28
4.	"Now Here's You"	Cipollina; Colla; Gibson; Hayes; Hopper; Lewis; John McFee	4:14
5.	"I Want You"	Brian Marnell	2:47

Side two
No.	Title	Length
1.	"Don't Ever Tell Me That You Love Me"	2:54
2.	"Hearts"	2:49
3.	"Trouble In Paradise"	3:11
4.	"Who Cares?"	3:54
5.	"If You Really Love Me You'll Let Me"	1:53

== Singles ==
"Some of My Lies Are True (Sooner or Later)" was written in San Francisco by the band and recorded in Los Angeles within three weeks, and the track was released as the album's first single. The song is about people betraying other people, including friends, old friends, and enemies. The B-side for the single was "Don't Ever Tell Me That You Love Me". Videos were shot for both songs and were later included on the band's 1985 VHS compilation, Video Hits. In 1986, remixes of the songs were included as B-sides to the singles "Hip to Be Square" and "Stuck with You", respectively.

A live recording of the song "Trouble in Paradise" was later included on the charity album We Are the World.

== Personnel ==
=== Huey Lewis and the News ===
- Huey Lewis – lead vocals, harmonica
- Chris Hayes – guitar, backing vocals
- Johnny Colla – guitar, saxophone, backing vocals
- Mario Cipollina – bass
- Bill Gibson – drums, backing vocals
- Sean Hopper – keyboards, backing vocals

=== Production ===
- Bill Schnee – producer, engineer, mixing
- Kirk Butler – assistant engineer
- Bill Cooper – assistant engineer
- Tim Dennen – assistant engineer
- Studio 55 (Los Angeles, California) – mixing location
- Doug Sax – mastering at The Mastering Lab (Hollywood, California)
- Billy Bass – art direction, cover concept
- Rod Dyer – design
- Bill Murphy – design
- Ron Slenzak – photography
- Chris Welch – liner notes
