= Picture This (Huey Lewis and the News album) =

Studio album by Huey Lewis and the News
- Released: January 29, 1982
- Recorded: March 1980–November 1981
- Studios: The Automatt, San Francisco
- Genres: Rock; pop rock
- Length: 33:54
- Label: Chrysalis
- Producer: Huey Lewis and the News

Huey Lewis and the News chronology
Huey Lewis and the News (1980)	Picture This (1982)	Sports (1983)

Singles from Picture This
- 1. "Do You Believe in Love" Released: January 22, 1982; 2. "Hope You Love Me Like You Say You Do" Released: May 4, 1982; 3. "Tattoo (Giving It All Up for Love)" Released: June 1982; 4. "Workin' for a Livin'" Released: July 23, 1982

Professional ratings
Review scores
Source	Rating
AllMusic	4/5 stars

Picture This is the second album by American rock band Huey Lewis and the News, released in 1982. The album brought the band their first top-ten hit, "Do You Believe in Love". It remained on the Billboard albums chart for 35 weeks and peaked at number 7.

== Background ==
The band produced the album themselves. Several outside tunes were included on the album including "Do You Believe in Love", written by Robert John "Mutt" Lange. (Lange and Lewis had a long-time connection, as Lange had produced two albums by Lewis' previous band, Clover, a group which also featured News member Sean Hopper.) "Do You Believe in Love" was released as the album's first single and became the band's breakthrough hit, reaching the top ten of the Billboard Hot 100 singles chart. The follow-up single, "Hope You Love Me Like You Say You Do", reached the top 40; while the third single, "Workin' for a Livin'", peaked at number 41.

"Tattoo (Giving It All Up for Love)" is a cover of a Phil Lynott song. Lynott was the singer and bassist for the hard rock group Thin Lizzy, and Huey Lewis had played harmonica on Lynott's first two solo albums, as well as Thin Lizzy's Live and Dangerous album. "Buzz Buzz Buzz" is a cover of a song from 1957 by The Hollywood Flames. "The Only One" was based on a real classmate in Lewis' junior high school who met an end similar to the person in the song. "He was a very cool kid" said Lewis. "Janey" in the song was also based on the classmate's girlfriend, though her name was changed and Lewis does not know of her true fate after her boyfriend's death.

== Track listing ==
Side one
No.	Title	Writer(s)	Length
1.	"Change of Heart"	Chris Hayes; Huey Lewis	3:41
2.	"Tell Me a Little Lie"	Johnny Colla; Lewis	3:42
3.	"Giving It All Up for Love"	Phil Lynott	3:11
4.	"Hope You Love Me Like You Say You Do"	Mike Duke	3:44
5.	"Workin for a Livin"	Hayes; Lewis	2:36

Side two
No.	Title	Writer(s)	Length
1.	"Do You Believe in Love"	Robert John "Mutt" Lange	3:30
2.	"Is It Me"	Hayes; Sean Hopper; Lewis	3:01
3.	"Whatever Happened to True Love"	Colla; Lewis	3:14
4.	"The Only One"	Colla; Lewis; Bill Gibson	4:46
5.	"Buzz Buzz Buzz"	Robert Byrd; John Gray	2:29

== Personnel ==
Huey Lewis and the News

- Huey Lewis – vocals and blues harp
- Chris Hayes – lead guitar, backing vocals
- Johnny Colla – saxophone, rhythm guitar, backing vocals
- Mario Cipollina – bass, backing vocals
- Bill Gibson – drums, percussion, backing vocals
- Sean Hopper – keyboards, backing vocals

Additional personnel

- The Tower of Power Horns

Production

- Huey Lewis and the News – producers
- Bob Brown – executive producer
- Jim Gaines – recording engineer
- Maureen Droney – assistant engineer
- Mark Deadman – sound engineer
- Bob Clearmountain – mixing at The Power Station (New York, NY).
- Bob Ludwig – mastering at Masterdisk (New York, NY).
- Janet Levinson – art direction
- Hugh Brown – photography
- Norman Moore – logo

== Charts ==
Chart (1982)	Peak position
Australian Albums (Kent Music Report)	75
Icelandic Albums (Tónlist)	3
US Billboard Top LPs & Tape	13

Singles

Year	Single	Chart	Position
1982	"Do You Believe in Love"	Billboard Hot 100	7
1982	"Do You Believe in Love"	Top Tracks (Billboard)	12
1982	"Hope You Love Me Like You Say You Do"	Billboard Hot 100	36
1982	"Workin' for a Livin' "	Billboard Hot 100	41
1982	"Workin' for a Livin' "	Top Tracks (Billboard)	20

== Certifications ==
Region	Certification	Certified units/sales
United States (RIAA)	Gold	500,000^{^}
^{^} Shipments figures based on certification alone.
