= Weather (Huey Lewis and the News album) =

Studio album by Huey Lewis and the News
- Released: February 14, 2020
- Recorded: 2017
- Studios: Trout Farm Studios (San Rafael, California)
- Genre: Rock
- Length: 26:01
- Labels: New Hulex; BMG
- Producers: Huey Lewis; Johnny Colla

Huey Lewis and the News chronology
Soulsville (2010)	Weather (2020)

Singles from Weather
- 1. "Her Love Is Killin' Me" Released: September 26, 2019; 2. "While We're Young" Released: December 5, 2019

Weather is the tenth studio album by American rock band Huey Lewis and the News, released on February 14, 2020, by New Hulex under license to BMG Rights Management.

The album consists of songs recorded before Lewis's 2018 hearing loss from Ménière's disease. Seven tracks had been completed before work on the album was indefinitely halted, and the band eventually decided to release the record as is.

== Development and release ==
Huey Lewis and the News had not released an album in nearly ten years and had not recorded an album of new material since 2001's Plan B. Plans for a new album had been circulating since 2012 when Lewis announced a new song they wrote called "While We're Young." "But now we need nine more," Lewis explained. While touring in the mid-2010s, the addition of a song titled "Her Love Is Killing Me" had been included in the band's setlist. By the end of 2017, Huey Lewis and the News had recorded a handful of songs for a new album, and it was anticipated that it would be released sometime in 2018.

However, in January 2018, when Huey Lewis was diagnosed with Ménière's disease, the band cancelled all future shows and placed the album on hold. A year later, it was announced the band had signed with BMG to release the new album.

"Her Love Is Killin' Me" (originally titled "Your Love Is Killing Me") was released as the first single in September 2019. In December 2019, "While We're Young" was made available to download and stream along with the announcement of the album's title and release date of February 14, 2020.

== Critical reception ==
Professional ratings
Review scores
Source	Rating
AllMusic	4/5 stars
The Times	3/5 stars

Critics were quick to note the brevity of the album with the understanding of Lewis's condition meaning this would be the final album by the band. In a review for AllMusic, Stephen Thomas Erlewine wrote even though they weren't "planning it as a goodbye, the album has a light, breezy tone, and that amiability is actually a fitting farewell for a group who always were a hard-working rock & soul combo." He concludes by stating "the record captures them at their best, delivering good-time music with a smile." Pablo Gorondi of the Associated Press wrote at "barely 26 minutes, Weather sounds complete nevertheless, with the band's trademark sounds and usually festive moods present and accounted for", calling it "a short but sweet addition to the Huey Lewis and The News catalog." From the UK, Will Hodgkinson of The Times believes Weather "makes for a positive, poignant swan song to Lewis's performing years."

== Track listing ==
Weather track listing
No.	Title	Writer(s)	Length
1.	"While We're Young"	Johnny Colla; Huey Lewis; John Pierce	3:45
2.	"Her Love Is Killin' Me"	Colla; Chris Hayes; Lewis	3:41
3.	"I Am There for You"	Colla; Lewis	4:13
4.	"Hurry Back Baby"	Bill Gibson; Lewis	3:55
5.	"Remind Me Why I Love You Again"	Colla; Gibson; Hayes; Lewis	3:20
6.	"Pretty Girls Everywhere"	Eugene Church; Thomas Williams	3:23
7.	"One of the Boys"	Colla; James Harrah; Lewis	3:48
Total length:			26:01

== Personnel ==
The News

- Huey Lewis – lead vocals, harmonica
- Johnnie Bamont – baritone saxophone
- Stef Burns – guitar, vocals
- Johnny Colla – guitar, saxophone, sequencing, vocals
- Bill Gibson – drums, vocals
- James Harrah – guitar, vocals
- Sean Hopper – keyboards, vocals
- Marvin McFadden – trumpet
- John Pierce – bass
- Rob Sudduth – tenor saxophone

Additional musicians

- Jeffrey Babko – piano ("I Am There for You")
- Chris Barnes – trumpet ("Remind Me Why I Love You Again")
- Bryan Dyer – backing vocals ("Hurry Back Baby")
- Niko Ellison – backing vocals ("I Am There for You", "Hurry Back Baby", "Remind Me Why I Love You Again", "Pretty Girls Everywhere")
- John McFee – steel guitar ("One of the Boys")
- Karl Perazzo – percussion ("Remind Me Why I Love You Again")
- Lorin Rowan – backing vocals ("Pretty Girls Everywhere")
- Ric Wilson – guitar ("I Am There for You")

== Charts ==
Chart performance for Weather
Chart (2020)	Peak position
German Albums (Offizielle Top 100)	21
Scottish Albums (Official Charts)	40
Swiss Albums (Schweizer Hitparade)	13
US Billboard 200	71
