= Perfect World (Huey Lewis and the News song) =

1988 single

Single by Huey Lewis and the News

from the album Small World
- B-side: "Slammin'"
- Released: June 1988
- Genre: Rock
- Length: 4:07
- Label: Chrysalis
- Songwriter: Alex Call
- Producers: Huey Lewis and the News

Huey Lewis and the News singles chronology
"Doing It All for My Baby" (1987)	"Perfect World" (1988)	"Small World (Part One)" (1988)

"Perfect World" is a song performed by Huey Lewis and the News and released as the first single from the album Small World in late June 1988. The single peaked at number three on the US Billboard Hot 100 and #48 on the UK Singles Chart.

== History ==
The song was written by Alex Call, a former bandmate of Lewis and Sean Hopper from the band, Clover. Call had previously co-written the hit song "867-5309/Jenny" for Tommy Tutone. Huey Lewis gave the song a reggae flavor. The song is an optimistic commentary on a human being's hopes and dreams, as well as our private thoughts. The song tells the person to "keep on dreaming," because there will never be a perfect world. The song admits that life isn't perfect, but tells the listener to use the power of positive dreaming to cope with the reality. The B-side to the single was an instrumental album track, "Slammin'".

== Music video ==
The music video features the band playing on a stage surrounded by garbage at the Redwood Landfill north of Novato, California. Various pieces of garbage are seen flying in the air, hitting various members of the band. Throughout the video, Huey Lewis dances and strolls through a pathway as work is done by garbage trucks behind him. At the end of the video, the band is seen posing by more garbage. The video received heavy rotation on MTV and peaked at #3 on the channel's Top 20 Video Countdown. Lewis has said that the video is one of his favorites that he's done, and considered it one of the more "relaxed" videos the band ever filmed. "The early [videos] were fun, but we had so much to do with limited budget that we had to work to exhaustion". Lewis felt the video was a "creative idea" and he enjoyed that it all took place in one location and was "fairly easy" to do.

== Reception ==
Reception for the song was mostly positive. Lynn Van Matre of the Chicago Tribune said that the song was "Wry," and it seemed "destined" to be another top ten single from the band. According to Martin Moynihan of the Albany Times Union, the song was "a pop music mix of Lewis' usual musical optimism tempered with an element of reserve" Stephen Thomas Erlewine of Allmusic said of the song, "None of the musical diversions work as well as the bouncy Top Ten hit 'Perfect World.'" Erlewine also believed that the song ranked "with the group's best material." Jerry Spangler of Deseret News said that the song was a "captivating rocker." New York Times reviewer Stephen Holden considers the song a "companion piece" to the first song off of the Small World album, "Small World, Part One".

== Chart performance ==
"Perfect World" was the first single released from the album Small World. Originally to be released in mid-June, the single's release was held off until later in the month. It was the 12th and last top 10 hit for the band, peaking at number three on the Billboard Hot 100.

=== Weekly charts ===
Chart (1988)	Peak position
Australia (Kent Music Report)	22
Canada Top Singles (RPM)	1
Canada Retail Singles (The Record)	6
Europe (European Hit Radio)	6
Finland (Suomen virallinen lista)	11
France (SNEP)	44
Israel (IBA)	18
Italy Airplay (Music & Media)	10
Netherlands (Single Top 100)	64
New Zealand (Recorded Music NZ)	43
South Africa (Springbok Radio Top 20)	14
Spain Airplay (Top 40 Radio)	26
UK Singles (OCC)	48
UK Airplay (Music & Media)	20
US Billboard Hot 100	3
US Adult Contemporary (Billboard)	2
US Album Rock Tracks (Billboard)	5

=== Year-end charts ===
Chart (1988)	Position
US Top Pop Singles (Billboard)	64
