= Hope You Love Me Like You Say You Do =

Single by Huey Lewis and the News

from the album Picture This
- B-side: "Whatever Happened to True Love"
- Released: 4 May 1982
- Recorded: San Francisco, California
- Genre: Pop rock
- Length: 3:44
- Label: Chrysalis Records
- Songwriter(s): Mike Duke
- Producer(s): Huey Lewis and the News

Huey Lewis and the News singles chronology
"Do You Believe in Love" (1982)	"Hope You Love Me Like You Say You Do" (1982)	"Workin' for a Livin'" (1982)

"Hope You Love Me Like You Say You Do" is a song performed by Huey Lewis and the News, released as the second single from the album Picture This in 1982. The single peaked at number 36 on the U.S. Billboard Hot 100, making it the band's second top 40 hit. It features the band Tower of Power, starting the long time friendship between both bands that led to collaborations on future projects.

== Recording ==
The song was written by Mike Duke, who would later write the songs, "Doing It All for My Baby" (1986) and "Let Her Go and Start Over" (2001), for the band. The lyrics explore the tension between a desire for independence and a need for compromise in a romantic relationship. The song was recorded in San Francisco.

The recording of this song led to the band's friendship with the band Tower of Power. Lewis ran into the band in the hallway during a break in recording of the song while Tower of Power was doing their own work on an album in a separate studio. Lewis asked them to appear on the song, which they agreed to and led to the band collaborating with Huey Lewis and the News on future songs.

A music video, filmed in May, 1982 in New York City, was produced with the band playing the song in the studio.

== Chart performance ==
Chart (1982)	Peak position
US Billboard Hot 100	36
US Cash Box Top 100	33
