= Workin' for a Livin' =

1982 single by Huey Lewis and the News

"Workin' for a Livin' "

Single by Huey Lewis and the News

from the album Picture This
- Released: 23 July 1982
- Recorded: 1981
- Genre: Rock
- Length: 2:36
- Label: Chrysalis
- Songwriters: Huey Lewis, Chris Hayes
- Producers: Huey Lewis and the News

Huey Lewis and the News singles chronology
"Hope You Love Me Like You Say You Do" (1982)	"Workin' for a Livin' " (1982)	"Heart and Soul" (1983)

"Workin' for a Livin' "

Single by Garth Brooks and Huey Lewis

from the album The Ultimate Hits
- Released: December 17, 2007
- Recorded: 2007
- Genre: Country
- Length: 2:44
- Label: Big Machine, Pearl
- Songwriters: Huey Lewis, Chris Hayes
- Producer: Allen Reynolds

Garth Brooks singles chronology
"More Than a Memory" (2007)	"Workin' for a Livin' " (2007)	"Midnight Sun" (2008)

"Workin' for a Livin'" is a single by American rock band Huey Lewis and the News, released in 1982. Included on their 1982 album Picture This, the song peaked at number 20 on the Billboard Mainstream Rock Tracks charts, and number 41 on the Billboard Hot 100. A live version appears as a B-side to the single "The Heart of Rock & Roll".

== History ==
According to Huey Lewis, the song was a semi-autobiographical one about past jobs he had before he became a musician. Lewis had written it during his time as a truck driver. "I wrote it when I was actually working," Lewis said. "I thought about all of the jobs which just sort of popped out." Some of the jobs listed in the song (busboy and bartender) were also jobs Lewis had before becoming a musician.

The song was used in the 1988 film Big starring Tom Hanks.

The 1992 Fox sitcom Rachel Gunn, R.N. used a version of the song sung by lead actress Christine Ebersole as its opening theme.

The song was also used in the trailer for Season 3 of Smiling Friends, as well as in episodes of For All Mankind, South Park and Stranger Things.

== Later version ==
In 2007, Lewis recorded the song as a duet with country music singer Garth Brooks. This duet version is included on Brooks' 2007 album, The Ultimate Hits, and was released as a single. It is Lewis' first appearance on the Hot Country Songs chart, where the single reached the top 20.

== Charts ==
=== Huey Lewis and the News version ===
Chart (1982)	Peak position
US Billboard Hot 100	41
US Mainstream Rock (Billboard)	20

=== Garth Brooks & Huey Lewis version ===
Chart (2007–2008)	Peak position
US Bubbling Under Hot 100 (Billboard)	15
US Hot Country Songs (Billboard)	19
