= Music of the Back to the Future franchise =

Film franchise soundtrack album list

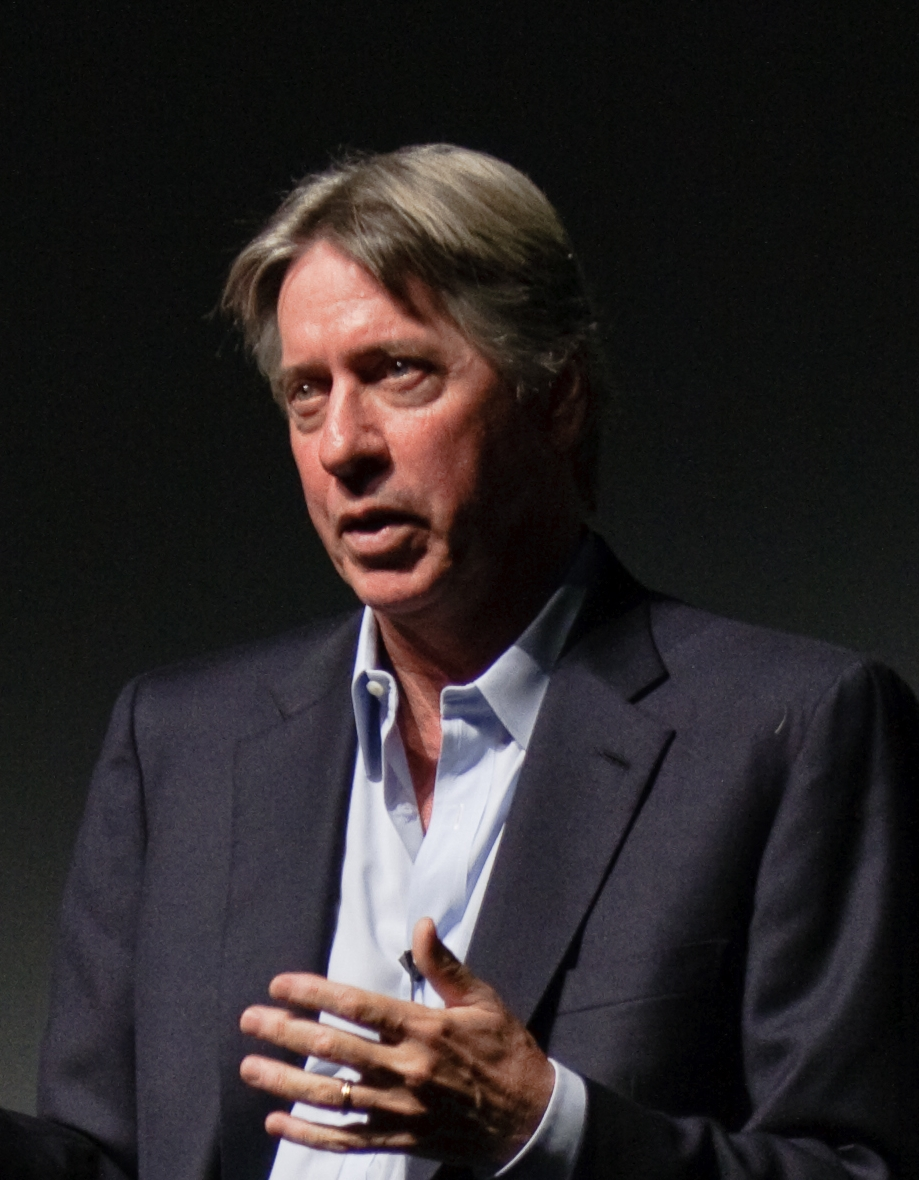
Alan Silvestri composed the scores for all three Back to the Future films and contributed music and lyrics to the stage musical of the same name.

The music of the Back to the Future franchise comprises soundtrack albums, film scores, compilation albums, and cast recording associated with the feature films and stage musical created by Robert Zemeckis and Bob Gale. Alan Silvestri composed the scores for all three films; the stage musical features music and lyrics by Silvestri and Glen Ballard. The franchise's music also includes pop and rock songs used prominently in the films, including songs by Huey Lewis and the News.

== Back to the Future (1985) ==
=== Soundtrack ===
Back to the Future: Music from the Motion Picture Soundtrack

Soundtrack album by various artists
- Released: July 8, 1985
- Genres: Pop rock; R&B
- Length: 37:41
- Label: MCA

Singles from Back to the Future: Music from the Motion Picture Soundtrack
- 1. "The Power of Love" Released: June 17, 1985

Back to the Future: Music from the Motion Picture Soundtrack is the soundtrack album for the film Back to the Future. It was released on July 8, 1985, by MCA Records. The album features two score tracks by Alan Silvestri, two pop songs by Huey Lewis and the News, two performances by the fictional Marvin Berry and the Starlighters, one performance by Marty McFly with the Starlighters, and two brief pop songs heard in the background of the film. AllMusic rated the soundtrack three stars out of five.

"The Power of Love" was issued as the album's lead single in June 1985, becoming Huey Lewis and the News's first US Billboard Hot 100 number-one single. It was certified Gold and received an Academy Award for Best Original Song nomination. The soundtrack spent 19 weeks on the Billboard 200, peaking at number 12 in October 1985. Later issues of the album were released by Geffen Records.

==== Development ====
American rock band Huey Lewis and the News recorded "The Power of Love" and "Back in Time". Huey Lewis was asked to write a theme song for the film. He met with Bob Gale, Steven Spielberg and Robert Zemeckis, who wanted the band to be Marty McFly's favorite band. Although flattered, Lewis initially declined because he did not know how to write film songs and did not want to write a song called "Back to the Future". Zemeckis assured Lewis he could write any song he wanted. Lewis agreed to submit the next song he wrote, which became "The Power of Love". The lyrics do not mention the film's storyline.

Lewis was asked by Zemeckis to write one more song for the film's end credits, which became "Back in Time". Unlike "The Power of Love", the lyrics of "Back in Time" refer to the film's plot. In a 2015 interview with People, Lewis said: "Sean [Hopper], [Chris] Hayes and I put together "Back in Time" – and it turned out that it's actually quite easy to write for film! In a way, it's easier, in that you don't have to invest yourself in it. So that was a lot of fun, actually".

"Johnny B. Goode", written by Chuck Berry, is performed in the film by the characters Marty McFly and the Starlighters. Michael J. Fox lip-syncs to vocals by Mark Campbell, with guitar by Tim May. Campbell and May received a "special thanks" acknowledgment in the film's end credits, while the recording was credited to "Marty McFly with the Starlighters" because the filmmakers wanted to maintain the illusion that Fox was singing. After music supervisor Bones Howe learned of this, he secured Campbell a small percentage of the soundtrack revenue as compensation. Berry withheld permission to use "Johnny B. Goode" until the day before filming, and was paid $50,000 for the rights.

==== In the film ====
In the film, Marvin Berry, a fictional cousin of Chuck Berry, telephones Chuck and plays him the song, telling him it is "that new sound you're looking for". "Johnny B. Goode" was released in 1958, three years after the scene in which it is played.

Huey Lewis portrays a high-school band audition judge who rejects Marty McFly's band, the "Pinheads", as they perform an instrumental hard rock version of "The Power of Love". Lewis said the character was inspired by a Chrysalis Records executive. "Time Bomb Town", "Heaven Is One Step Away", "The Wallflower (Dance with Me, Henry)" and "Back in Time" are briefly heard as diegetic music in several scenes; "Back in Time" is additionally played in full in the film's end credits.

==== Track listing ====
No.	Title	Writer(s)	Performer	Length
1.	"The Power of Love"	Huey Lewis; Chris Hayes; Johnny Colla	Huey Lewis and the News	3:58
2.	"Time Bomb Town"	Lindsey Buckingham	Lindsey Buckingham	2:44
3.	"Back to the Future"	Alan Silvestri	The Outatime Orchestra	3:20
4.	"Heaven Is One Step Away^{[c]}"	Eric Clapton	Eric Clapton	4:13
5.	"Back in Time"	Colla; Hayes; Sean Hopper; Lewis	Huey Lewis and the News	4:22
6.	"Back to the Future Overture"	Alan Silvestri	The Outatime Orchestra	8:18
7.	"The Wallflower (Dance with Me, Henry)"	Johnny Otis; Hank Ballard; Etta James	Etta James	2:41
8.	"Night Train"	Oscar Washington; Lewis P. Simpkins; Jimmy Forrest	Marvin Berry & The Starlighters^{[a]}	2:17
9.	"Earth Angel (Will You Be Mine)"	Curtis Williams; Jesse Belvin; Gaynel Hodge	Marvin Berry & The Starlighters^{[a]}	3:02
10.	"Johnny B. Goode"	Chuck Berry	Marty McFly with The Starlighters^{[b]}	3:06
Total length:				37:41

- ^{^a} Lead vocals provided by Harry Waters Jr.
- ^{^b} Lead vocals provided by Mark Campbell
- ^{^c} Produced by Phil Collins (who also performed backing vocals & percussion.)

Songs that appear as diegetic music in the film but are not included on the soundtrack album:

- "The Washington Post" – composed by John Philip Sousa
- "Mr. Sandman" – performed by The Four Aces
- "The Ballad of Davy Crockett" – performed by Fess Parker
- "Pledging My Love" – performed by Johnny Ace
- "Out the Window" – performed by Edward Van Halen

==== Charts ====
Chart (1985–86)	Peak position
Australia (Kent Music Report)	36
Belgian Albums (Ultratop)	66
Canada Top Albums/CDs (RPM)	21
New Zealand Albums (RMNZ)	47
UK Albums (Official Charts)	66
US Billboard 200	12

==== Certifications ====
Region	Certification	Certified units/sales
Canada (Music Canada)	Gold	50,000^{^}
United States (RIAA)	Gold	500,000^{^}
^{^} Shipments figures based on certification alone.

=== Film score ===
Back to the Future: Intrada Special Collection

Film score by Alan Silvestri
- Released: November 24, 2009
- Recorded: May 16 to June 11, 1985
- Studios: The Burbank Studios (Burbank, California)
- Genre: Score
- Length: 89:08
- Label: Intrada

Back to the Future: Intrada Special Collection was released by Intrada Records on November 24, 2009, and contains Alan Silvestri's complete score for Back to the Future. The two-disc release includes the complete orchestral score and two source cues written by Silvestri on the first disc. The second disc contains alternate versions of much of the score, with a darker, more serious tone. The two-disc set was limited to 10,000 units and had sold nearly 6,000 copies by the end of January 2010.

The score was reissued on October 12, 2015, as a single-disc release titled Back to the Future: Original Motion Picture Soundtrack (Expanded Edition), commemorating the film's 30th anniversary. This release contains only the music from the first disc of the original limited two-disc set.

==== Development ====
Alan Silvestri had previously worked with director Robert Zemeckis on Romancing the Stone. Silvestri said Zemeckis's only direction for the score was that "it's got to be big". Silvestri used an orchestral score to contrast the film's small-town setting with its time-travel story, and developed a heroic theme designed to be instantly recognizable from only a few notes.

For scenes in which Silvestri's score was shortened, replaced with source music, or unused, the release presents the full cues as originally recorded. These include the final moments of "Einstein Disintegrated" and "Peabody Barn; Marty Ditches DeLorean", as well as "Town Square" and "Logo".

Themes from the score were later used in the film's sequels, in Back to the Future: The Ride, and as ambient music at Universal Studios theme parks.

==== Track listing ====
Disc 1: The Complete Original Motion Picture Soundtrack

1. "Logo": 0:21
2. "DeLorean Reveal": 0:48
3. "Einstein Disintegrated": 1:22
4. "'85 Twin Pines Mall": 4:44
5. "Peabody Barn; Marty Ditches DeLorean": 3:09
6. "'55 Town Square": 1:17
7. "Lorraine's Bedroom": 0:48
8. "Retrieve DeLorean": 1:14
9. "1.21 Jigowatts": 1:37
10. "The Picture": 1:08
11. "Picture Fades": 0:18
12. "Skateboard Chase": 1:40
13. "Marty's Letter": 1:21
14. "George to the Rescue – Pt. 1": 0:51
15. "Marvin Be-Bop": 2:27
16. "George to the Rescue – Pt. 2": 2:36
17. "Tension/The Kiss": 1:34
18. "Goodnight Marty": 1:32
19. "It's Been Educational/Clocktower": 10:30
20. "Helicopter": 0:21
21. "'85 Lone Pine Mall": 3:48
22. "4x4": 0:41
23. "Doc Returns": 1:14
24. "Back to the Future": 3:15

Disc 2: The Creation of a Classic... alternate Early Sessions

1. "DeLorean Reveal"
2. "Einstein Disintegrated"
3. "Peabody Barn"
4. "Marty Ditches DeLorean"
5. "'55 Town Square #1"
6. "'55 Town Square #2"
7. "Retrieve DeLorean"
8. "1.21 Jigowatts"
9. "The Picture"
10. "Skateboard Chase"
11. "George to the Rescue"
12. "Tension; The Kiss"
13. "Clocktower"
14. "'85 Lone Pine Mall"
15. "Doc Returns"
16. "Ling Ting Ring"

== Back to the Future Part II (1989) ==
Back to the Future Part II: Original Motion Picture Soundtrack

Film score by Alan Silvestri
- Released: November 22, 1989
- Recorded: September 14 to November 2, 1989
- Studios: The Burbank Studios (Burbank, California)
- Genre: Score
- Length: 44:55
- Label: MCA

Back to the Future Part II: Original Motion Picture Soundtrack is the film score album for the 1989 film Back to the Future Part II, the second installment in the Back to the Future trilogy. It was released by MCA Records on November 22, 1989, and features most of the film score, composed and conducted by Alan Silvestri and performed by the Hollywood Studio Symphony. AllMusic rated the soundtrack four-and-a-half stars out of five. Unlike the previous soundtrack album, it contains only Silvestri's score and omits the vocal songs featured in the film.

Intrada Records reissued the soundtrack as a two-disc expanded edition on October 12, 2015, to commemorate the first film's 30th anniversary. The release includes the complete score, consisting of 22 tracks, on disc one and alternate cues and source music on disc two.

=== Track listings ===
Standard edition

1. "Main Title": 2:22
2. "The Future": 5:24
3. "Hoverboard Chase": 2:50
4. "A Flying DeLorean?": 4:31
5. "My Father!": 2:05
6. "Alternate 1985": 3:05
7. "If They Ever Did": 3:58
8. "Pair O' Docs": 1:28
9. "The Book": 4:50
10. "Tunnel Chase": 5:22
11. "Burn The Book": 2:26
12. "Western Union": 1:53
13. "End Title": 4:38

Expanded edition – Disc 1: The Film Score

1. "Back to Back / It's Your Kids"
2. "Main Title (extended version)"
3. "The Future"
4. "Chicken / Hoverboard Chase"
5. "A Flying DeLorean?"
6. "I'm in The Future / Biff Steals DeLorean"
7. "Chicken Needles / Jenn Sees Jenn"
8. "Biff's World / 27th Floor"
9. "My Father!"
10. "Alternate 1985"
11. "Gray's Sports Almanac / If They Ever Did"
12. "Something Inconspicuous"
13. "You'll Never Lose / Old New DeLorean"
14. "Pair O' Docs"
15. "The Book"
16. "Nobody / Tunnel Chase"
17. "Burn The Book"
18. "He's Gone"
19. "Western Union"
20. "I'm Back / End Logo"
21. "The West"
22. "End Title"

Expanded edition – Disc 2: Alternates

1. "Back to Back (alternate)"
2. "Main Title (alternate)"
3. "The Future (alternate)"
4. "Hoverboard Chase (alternate)"
5. "A Flying DeLorean? (alternate)"
6. "Biff's World (alternate)"
7. "If They Ever Did (alternate segment)"
8. "You'll Never Lose (alternate)"
9. "Western Union (alternate #1)"
10. "I'm Back (alternate #1)"
11. "Western Union (alternate #2)"
12. "I'm Back (alternate #2)"
13. "End Logo (alternate)"
14. "The West (alternate)"
15. "End Title (alternate)"

== Back to the Future Part III (1990) ==
Back to the Future Part III: Original Motion Picture Soundtrack

Film score by Alan Silvestri
- Released: May 29, 1990
- Recorded: 1989–1990
- Studios: The Burbank Studios (Burbank, California)
- Genre: Score
- Length: 44:58
- Label: Varèse Sarabande

Back to the Future Part III: Original Motion Picture Soundtrack is the film score album for the film Back to the Future Part III, the third and final installment in the Back to the Future trilogy. It was released by Varèse Sarabande on May 29, 1990, and features most of the film score by Alan Silvestri. The soundtrack includes the acoustic instrumental version of the song "Doubleback" as performed in the film, but does not include the original ZZ Top version of the song played during the end credits.

Varèse Sarabande reissued the soundtrack as a two-disc expanded edition on October 12, 2015, to commemorate the film's 25th anniversary. The soundtrack includes the complete score in chronological order on the first disc, and alternate cues, source music, and acoustic renditions of traditional folk songs on the second disc.

=== Track listings ===
Standard edition

1. "Main Title": 3:08
2. "It's Clara (The Train, Part II)": 4:36
3. "Hill Valley": 2:21
4. "The Hanging": 1:45
5. "At First Sight": 3:18
6. "Indians": 1:12
7. "Goodbye Clara": 3:02
8. "Doc Returns": 2:55
9. "Point of No Return (The Train, Part III)": 3:49
10. "The Future Isn't Written": 3:37
11. "The Showdown": 1:30
12. "Doc to the Rescue": 0:57
13. "The Kiss": 1:55
14. "We're Out of Gas": 1:18
15. "Wake Up Juice": 1:12
16. "A Science Experiment (The Train, Part I)": 3:11
17. "Doubleback (acoustic instrumental version)": 1:20
18. "End Credits": 4:02

25th Anniversary edition – Disc 1: The Film Score

1. "Back to Back / Court House"
2. "Main Title"
3. "Into the Mine / Tombstone / It's Me"
4. "Warmed Up"
5. "Indians (film version)"
6. "Safe and Sound"
7. "Hill Valley"
8. "The Hanging"
9. "We're Out of Gas"
10. "There is No Bridge / Doc to the Rescue"
11. "At First Sight"
12. "Yellow"
13. "The Kiss"
14. "You Talkin' to Me?"
15. "The Future Isn't Written"
16. "Goodbye Clara"
17. "What's Up Doc / Marty Gallops / To the Future"
18. "Wake Up Juice"
19. "Callin' You Out / Count Off"
20. "The Showdown / The Kick"
21. "A Science Experiment (The Train – Part I)"
22. "It's Clara (The Train – Part II)"
23. "Point of No Return (The Train – Part III)"
24. "It's Destroyed / Back to the Girlfriend / It's Erased"
25. "Doc Returns"
26. "End Credits"

25th Anniversary edition – Disc 2: Alternates

1. "Back to Back / Court House (alternate)"
2. "I'm Back / Main Title (alternate)"
3. "Into the Mine / Tombstone (alternate)"
4. "Warmed Up (alternate)"
5. "Indians (alternate)"
6. "The Hanging (alternate)"
7. "Goodbye Clara (alternate segment)"
8. "Count Off (alternate)"
9. "The Kick (alternate)"
10. "Doc's Return (alternate)"
11. "Clock Dedication / Battle Cry of Freedom"
12. "Doubleback (extended version)"
13. "Turkey in the Straw"
14. "My Darling Clementine"
15. "Saloon Piano Melody"
16. "Arkansas Traveler"
17. "Devil's Dream"
18. "Pop Goes the Weasel"
19. "Virginia Reel (Tip-Top)"
20. "I'm Back (alternate #2)"
21. "Into the Mine (alternate #2)"
22. "Indians (alternate #2)"
23. "Doc Returns (alternate #2)"

== The Back to the Future Trilogy ==
The Back to the Future Trilogy

Film score / compilation album by John Debney and Royal Scottish National Orchestra
- Released: September 21, 1999
- Venues: Glasgow City Halls (Glasgow, Scotland)
- Genre: Score
- Length: 48:02
- Label: Varèse Sarabande

The Back to the Future Trilogy is a soundtrack compilation album released by Varèse Sarabande on September 21, 1999. The album compiles Alan Silvestri compositions from all three Back to the Future film scores, as well as the theme from Back to the Future: The Ride. Although the tracks from Part III are taken from the film's original soundtrack, the tracks for Part I, Part II and The Ride are re-recorded versions performed by John Debney and the Royal Scottish National Orchestra at the Glasgow City Halls.

=== Track listing ===
All music is composed by Alan Silvestri.

No.	Title	Film	Length
1.	"Back to the Future"	Back to the Future (1985)	3:28
2.	"Skateboard Chase"	Back to the Future	1:45
3.	"Marty's Letter"	Back to the Future	1:34
4.	"Clocktower Pt. 1"	Back to the Future	5:22
5.	"Clocktower Pt. 2 / Helicopter"	Back to the Future	5:42
6.	"'85 Lone Pine Mall"	Back to the Future	3:43
7.	"4x4"	Back to the Future	0:54
8.	"Doc Returns"	Back to the Future	1:27
9.	"Hill Valley, 2015"	Back to the Future Part II (1989)	4:11
10.	"Burn the Book"	Back to the Future Part II	2:46
11.	"He's Gone"	Back to the Future Part II	0:44
12.	"The Letter"	Back to the Future Part II	2:00
13.	"I'm Back"	Back to the Future Part II	0:51
14.	"End Logo"	Back to the Future Part II	0:19
15.	"The West"	Back to the Future Part II	1:12
16.	"Main Title"	Back to the Future Part III (1990)	3:06
17.	"Indians"	Back to the Future Part III	1:10
18.	"Point of No Return (The Train Pt. III)"	Back to the Future Part III	3:48
19.	"End Credits"	Back to the Future Part III	4:00
20.	"Back to the Future: The Ride"	Back to the Future: The Ride (1991)	4:10
Total length:			48:02

== Back to the Future: The Musical (2020) ==
Back to the Future: The Musical (Original Cast Recording)

Cast recording by the original West End cast of Back to the Future: The Musical
- Released: March 11, 2022
- Venues: Adelphi Theatre (West End, London)
- Genre: Show tunes
- Length: 73:59
- Label: Masterworks Broadway

Back to the Future: The Musical (Original Cast Recording) is the cast recording of the musical of the same name, which features music and lyrics by Alan Silvestri and Glen Ballard and a book by Bob Gale. Recorded by the musical's original West End cast, it was released by Sony Music's Masterworks Broadway imprint on March 11, 2022. The musical's score was nominated for the Laurence Olivier Award for Best Original Score or New Orchestrations in 2022.

=== Background ===
The Back to the Future website originally announced on October 21, 2020 ("Back to the Future Day") that a cast recording of the West End production would be released in summer 2021. The announcement coincided with the release of Dobson's rendition of "Back in Time", originally written for and featured in the first film, and the original track "Put Your Mind to It". The cast recording was initially scheduled for release on November 26, 2021, but was delayed several times before its release on March 11, 2022.

=== Commercial performance ===
On the Official Charts Company rankings in the United Kingdom, the cast recording peaked at number 5 on the Official Compilations Chart, number 8 on the Official Album Downloads Chart and number 2 on the Official Soundtrack Albums Chart.

=== Track listing ===
All tracks are written by Alan Silvestri and Glen Ballard, except where noted.

No.	Title	Performer(s)	Length
1.	"Overture"	The Outatime Orchestra	0:55
2.	"It's Only a Matter of Time"	Olly Dobson; Cedric Neal; Ensemble	3:02
3.	"Audition / Got No Future" (Silvestri, Ballard, Huey Lewis, Chris Hayes, Johnny Colla)	Dobson	1:14
4.	"Wherever We're Going"	Courtney-Mae Briggs; Dobson	3:04
5.	"Hello, Is Anybody Home"	Dobson; Hugh Coles; Will Haswell; Emma Lloyd; Rosanna Hyland	5:04
6.	"It Works"	Roger Bart; Ensemble	2:56
7.	"Don't Drive 88!"	The Outatime Orchestra	1:14
8.	"Cake"	Katharine Pearson; Mark Oxtoby; Ensemble	2:43
9.	"Gotta Start Somewhere"	Neal; Ensemble	3:12
10.	"My Myopia"	Coles	3:02
11.	"Pretty Baby"	Hyland; Ensemble	2:18
12.	"Future Boy"	Dobson; Bart; Ensemble	3:32
13.	"Something About That Boy"	Hyland; Aidan Cutler; Ensemble	3:36
14.	"21st Century"	Bart; Ensemble	4:54
15.	"Put Your Mind to It"	Dobson; Hugh Coles	3:00
16.	"For the Dreamers"	Bart	2:57
17.	"Teach Him a Lesson"	Cutler; Haswell; Shane O'Riordan	1:43
18.	"The Letter / Only a Matter of Time (Reprise)"	The Outatime Orchestra; Dobson; Briggs	3:42
19.	"Deep Divin'"	Neal; Ensemble; Steve Holmes (piano solo)	2:28
20.	"Earth Angel (Will You Be Mine)" (Curtis Williams, Jesse Belvin, Gaynel Hodge)	Neal; Coles; Hyland; Ensemble	1:58
21.	"Johnny B. Goode" (Chuck Berry)	Dobson; Ensemble	2:26
22.	"The Clocktower / For the Dreamers (Reprise)"	The Outatime Orchestra; Bart; Ensemble	6:07
23.	"The Power of Love" (Lewis, Chris Hayes, Colla)	Dobson; Neal; Briggs; Ensemble	3:22
24.	"Doc Returns / Finale"	The Outatime Orchestra; Ensemble	1:49
25.	"Back in Time" (Colla, Lewis, Hayes, Sean Hopper)	Dobson; Bart	2:03
26.	"Exit Music (Back in Time)" (Colla, Lewis, Hayes, Sean Hopper)	The Outatime Orchestra	1:38
Total length:			73:59

=== Charts ===
Chart performance for Back to the Future: The Musical (Original Cast Recording)
Chart (2022)	Peak position
UK Compilation Albums (OCC)	5
UK Album Downloads (OCC)	8
UK Soundtrack Albums (OCC)	2
