= The Power of Love (Huey Lewis and the News song) =

- Artwork for US and continental European releases

Single by Huey Lewis and the News

from the album Back to the Future: Music from the Motion Picture Soundtrack
- B-side: "Bad Is Bad"
- Released: June 17, 1985
- Recorded: May 30, 1985
- Genre: Pop rock; power pop
- Length: 3:53 (single version); 7:10 (12-inch long version)
- Label: Chrysalis
- Songwriters: Huey Lewis, Chris Hayes, Johnny Colla
- Producers: Huey Lewis and the News

Huey Lewis and the News singles chronology
| "Walking on a Thin Line" (1984) | "The Power of Love" (1985) | "Stuck with You" (1986) |

Music video
- "The Power of Love" on YouTube

"The Power of Love" is a song by Huey Lewis and the News, written for the soundtrack of the 1985 film Back to the Future. The song was released as a single and became the band's first number-one hit on the US Billboard Hot 100 and their second number-one hit on the US Mainstream Rock chart. In the United Kingdom, it was released as a double-A side with "Do You Believe in Love," becoming the band's only top ten hit on the UK Singles Chart. The song is included alongside "Back in Time" on the film's soundtrack, and appears as a bonus track on international editions of the band's fourth studio album, Fore!

== Development ==
Huey Lewis was approached to write a theme song for the film. He met with Bob Gale, Steven Spielberg, and Robert Zemeckis, from the film's production team, who intended that the band be Marty McFly's favorite band. Though flattered, Lewis did not want to participate because he did not know how to write film songs and did not want to write one called "Back to the Future." Zemeckis assured Lewis he could write any song he wanted. Lewis agreed to submit the next song he wrote, which was "The Power of Love." The lyrics do not make any mention of the film's storyline.

== Use in Back to the Future ==
The song appears early in Back to the Future as Marty McFly (played by Michael J. Fox) skateboards to school. Later that day, McFly and his band begin a hard-rock version of the song for a Battle of the Bands audition at his school, but is interrupted by one of the judges (played by Huey Lewis himself) telling Marty's group that they are "just too darn loud". Then the song is heard again when Marty returns to his neighborhood. In the sequel, Back to the Future Part II, the 2015 version of Marty attempts to play the song on his guitar just after being fired but ends up playing it very poorly due to lack of practice and also his damaged hand from his 1985 collision with a Rolls-Royce. Finally, it can be briefly heard playing in the car where Needles and his buddies are driving when Needles challenges Marty to the fate-determining car race near the end of Back to the Future Part III.

== Music video ==
The music video, filmed in June 1985, shows the band playing in a nightclub (Uncle Charlie's, a frequent stop for the band in their early career) with Emmett "Doc" Brown (Christopher Lloyd) showing up in his DeLorean "Time Machine", apparently after time-traveling, and a couple stealing it for a joy ride. Lewis said filming took the entire day and night to complete, with the band finishing up at 3:00 AM. The video is included as a bonus feature in several home video releases of Back to the Future. The video was added into rotation on MTV starting on the week of June 26th, 1985.

== Mixes ==
Three different mixes of the song have co-existed since its release in 1985. The Back to the Future soundtrack version, also the version used in the music video, has a run time of 3:51.

A 12" version of the song was released to most countries, remixed by John "Jellybean" Benitez, features a seven-minute dance version with changes in its mix such as additional backing keyboards and an extended guitar solo.

A 7" single released in 1985 to radio in some countries as promotion of the film contains an edit of the aforementioned extended remix, with a run time of 4:21. In selected countries, this shorter edit was featured on the B-side of the 12" single. Whilst this version is occasionally played on radio, it has only ever been included on one Huey Lewis "Best Of" and the West German pressing version of Fore!

== Reception ==
Cash Box said that "the inimitable charm and drive which made Sports such a pop/rock winner is displayed from the first chords".

At the 13th Annual American Music Awards, the song was nominated for "Favorite Single" and "Favorite Video Single," winning in both categories. The song was nominated for an Academy Award for Best Original Song at the 58th Academy Awards but lost to Lionel Richie's "Say You, Say Me." It was also nominated at the 28th Annual Grammy Awards for Record of the Year, but lost against USA for Africa's "We Are the World," to which Lewis and his bandmates had contributed backing vocals.

== In other media ==
The song appears as a playable track in the 2010 video game Rock Band 3.

A cover of the song performed by Brazilian singer Bruno Faglioni was the opening theme of the Brazilian reality competition Power Couple throughout its run from 2016 to 2022.

The song appears in the 2018 romantic comedy film Set It Up.

In July 2022, the song was added to Taiko no Tatsujin Pop Tap Beat in a free update, becoming the first conventional Western pop song in a Taiko no Tatsujin game since the Japanese version of Taiko: Drum Master 17 years prior.

The song was featured on the official soundtrack of the 2024 Marvel Cinematic Universe film Deadpool & Wolverine. It plays during a montage in which Deadpool travels the multiverse in search of a variant of Wolverine to replace the deceased version from his world, as he was the "Anchor Being" keeping the timeline intact.

In July 2017, then-Alkaline Trio drummer Derek Grant remixed the track to include vocals and guitars taken from Alkaline Trio's 2005 song "The Poison".

The song appeared in the "Back to the Future" world in 2015's Lego Dimensions. It can only be heard in the 1985 version of the world.

The song was added to Fortnite as a playable Jam Track in December 2025, alongside other elements from Back to the Future.

In 2026, Canadian jazz musician Cory Weeds recorded a jazz instrumental version of "The Power of Love" as part of an album of other jazz covers, titled appropriately, "Hip to Be Square: Cory Weeds Plays Huey Lewis and the News".

== Use in stage musicals ==
In 2024, the song had the unusual distinction of being prominently featured in two Broadway shows at the same time: Back to the Future: The Musical and The Heart of Rock and Roll. In Back to the Future, the song is sung by Marty McFly's character, unlike in the film. In The Heart of Rock and Roll, a jukebox musical composed of Huey Lewis songs, the song is sung by the lead character "Bobby".

== Track listings ==
7-inch Chrysalis / HUEY 1 United Kingdom

1. "The Power of Love" – 3:53
2. "Bad Is Bad" – 3:46

7-inch Chrysalis / HUEY 3 United Kingdom

1. "The Power of Love"
2. "Do You Believe in Love?"
- also released as a 7-inch picture disc HUEYP 3
- 1986 re-issue

7-inch Chrysalis / 107 614 Canada

1. "The Power of Love" – 4:21
2. "Finally Found a Home" – 3:41

7-inch Chrysalis / CHS-42876 Canada

1. "The Power of Love" – 3:53
2. "Bad is Bad" – 3:46

12-inch Chrysalis / CS 42889 United States

1. "The Power of Love" (Long version) – 7:10
2. "The Power of Love" (Instrumental) – 4:12
3. "The Power of Love" (Short version) – 4:18

12-inch Chrysalis / HUEYX1 United Kingdom

1. "The Power of Love" – 7:10
2. "Bad Is Bad" – 3:46
3. "It's All Right" (Live version) (Curtis Mayfield) – 3:03
4. "I Want a New Drug" (Live version) – 5:57

12-inch Chrysalis / HUEYX3 United Kingdom

1. "The Power of Love" (Extended version)
2. "Do You Believe in Love?"
3. "Back in Time"
- 1986 re-issue

12-inch Chrysalis / 601 822 Germany

1. "The Power of Love" – 7:10
2. "It's All Right" (Live version) (Curtis Mayfield) – 3:03
3. "I Want a New Drug" (Live version) – 5:57

== Personnel ==
- Huey Lewis – lead vocals
- Sean Hopper – keyboards, backing vocals
- Bill Gibson – drums, percussion, backing vocals
- Johnny Colla – rhythm guitar, backing vocals
- Mario Cipollina – bass
- Chris Hayes – lead guitar, backing vocals

== Charts ==
"The Power of Love" debuted on the Billboard Hot 100 chart at No. 46 for the week ending June 29, 1985, with Billboard calling the song "an out-of-the-box monster hit."

=== Weekly charts ===
| Chart (1985–1986) | Peak position |
|---|---|
| Australia (Kent Music Report) | 1 |
| Austria (Ö3 Austria Top 40) | 24 |
| Belgium (Ultratop 50 Flanders) | 17 |
| Canada Top Singles (RPM) | 1 |
| Canada Retail Singles (The Record) | 3 |
| Europe (Eurochart Hot 100) | 8 |
| Europe (European Hit Radio) | 3 |
| Finland (Suomen virallinen lista) | 23 |
| France (SNEP) | 38 |
| Ireland (IRMA) | 5 |
| Israel (IBA) | 23 |
| Italy (Musica e dischi) | 11 |
| Japan (Oricon) | 1 |
| Netherlands (Single Top 100) | 25 |
| New Zealand (Recorded Music NZ) | 3 |
| South Africa (Springbok Radio Top 20) | 4 |
| Spain Airplay (Top 40 Radio) | 7 |
| Switzerland (Schweizer Hitparade) | 11 |
| UK Singles (Official Charts) | 9 |
| UK Airplay (Music & Media) | 2 |
| US Billboard Hot 100 | 1 |
| US Dance Club Songs (Billboard) | 22 |
| US Adult Contemporary (Billboard) | 6 |
| US Mainstream Rock Airplay (Billboard) | 1 |
| West Germany (GfK) | 16 |
| Zimbabwe (ZIMA) | 7 |

=== Year-end charts ===
| Chart (1985) | Position |
|---|---|
| Australia (Kent Music Report) | 24 |
| Canada Top Singles (RPM) | 11 |
| New Zealand (Recorded Music NZ) | 29 |
| US Billboard Hot 100 | 15 |

| Chart (1986) | Position |
|---|---|
| UK Singles (OCC) | 84 |

== Certifications ==
| Region | Certification | Certified units/sales |
|---|---|---|
| Canada (Music Canada) | Gold | 50,000^{^} |
| Denmark (IFPI Danmark) | Gold | 45,000^{‡} |
| New Zealand (RMNZ) | 2× Platinum | 60,000^{‡} |
| Spain (Promusicae) | Gold | 30,000^{‡} |
| United Kingdom (BPI) | Platinum | 600,000^{‡} |
| United States (RIAA) | Gold | 500,000^{^} |
^{^} Shipments figures based on certification alone.^{‡} Sales+streaming figures based on certification alone.

== See also ==
- List of number-one singles in Australia during the 1980s
- List of number-one singles of 1985 (Canada)
- List of Billboard Hot 100 number-one singles of 1985
- List of Billboard Mainstream Rock number-one songs of the 1980s
