= Do You Believe in Love =

Single by Huey Lewis and the News

from the album Picture This
- B-side: "Is It Me"
- Released: January 22, 1982
- Recorded: 1981
- Genre: Pop
- Length: 3:30
- Label: Chrysalis
- Songwriter: Robert John "Mutt" Lange
- Producer: Huey Lewis and the News

Huey Lewis and the News singles chronology
"Now Here's You" (1980)	"Do You Believe in Love" (1982)	"Hope You Love Me Like You Say You Do" (1982)

"Do You Believe in Love" is a song by Robert John "Mutt" Lange that was recorded by the American rock band Huey Lewis and the News. It was the first US top-ten hit for the band peaking at number seven in April 1982, off their second album Picture This.

== History ==
When Lange wrote the song and submitted it to the band, it was entitled "We Both Believe in Love", but was retitled after Lewis made some lyrical revisions. The unrevised version was originally recorded by British band Supercharge, on which Lange sang lead vocals, on the 1979 album Body Rhythm.

The song became the band's breakthrough hit, peaking at number seven on the Billboard Hot 100 pop singles chart.

A music video for the song was filmed in February 1982 in Los Angeles. The music video features a scene with the band singing into a sleeping woman's ear, followed by the next morning, singing in the kitchen. This video received heavy airplay in the early days of MTV, contributing to the breakthrough popularity of both the song and the band.

In the UK, the song was released as a double A-side with "The Power of Love" in 1985. This release peaked at number nine on the UK Singles Chart, the band's only top ten hit in the territory.

== Chart performance ==
=== Weekly charts ===
Chart (1982)	Peak position
Australia (Kent Music Report)	18
Canada Top Singles (RPM)	14
Canada Retail Singles (The Record)	7
Iceland (Íslenski Listinn Topp 40)	2
Israel (IBA)	4
New Zealand (Recorded Music NZ)	36
US Billboard Hot 100	7
US Billboard Mainstream Rock Tracks	12
Chart (1985–1986)	Peak position
UK Singles (OCC)	9

=== Year-end charts ===
Chart (1982)	Rank
Australia	144
US Billboard Hot 100	51
