= Huey Lewis =

American singer and actor

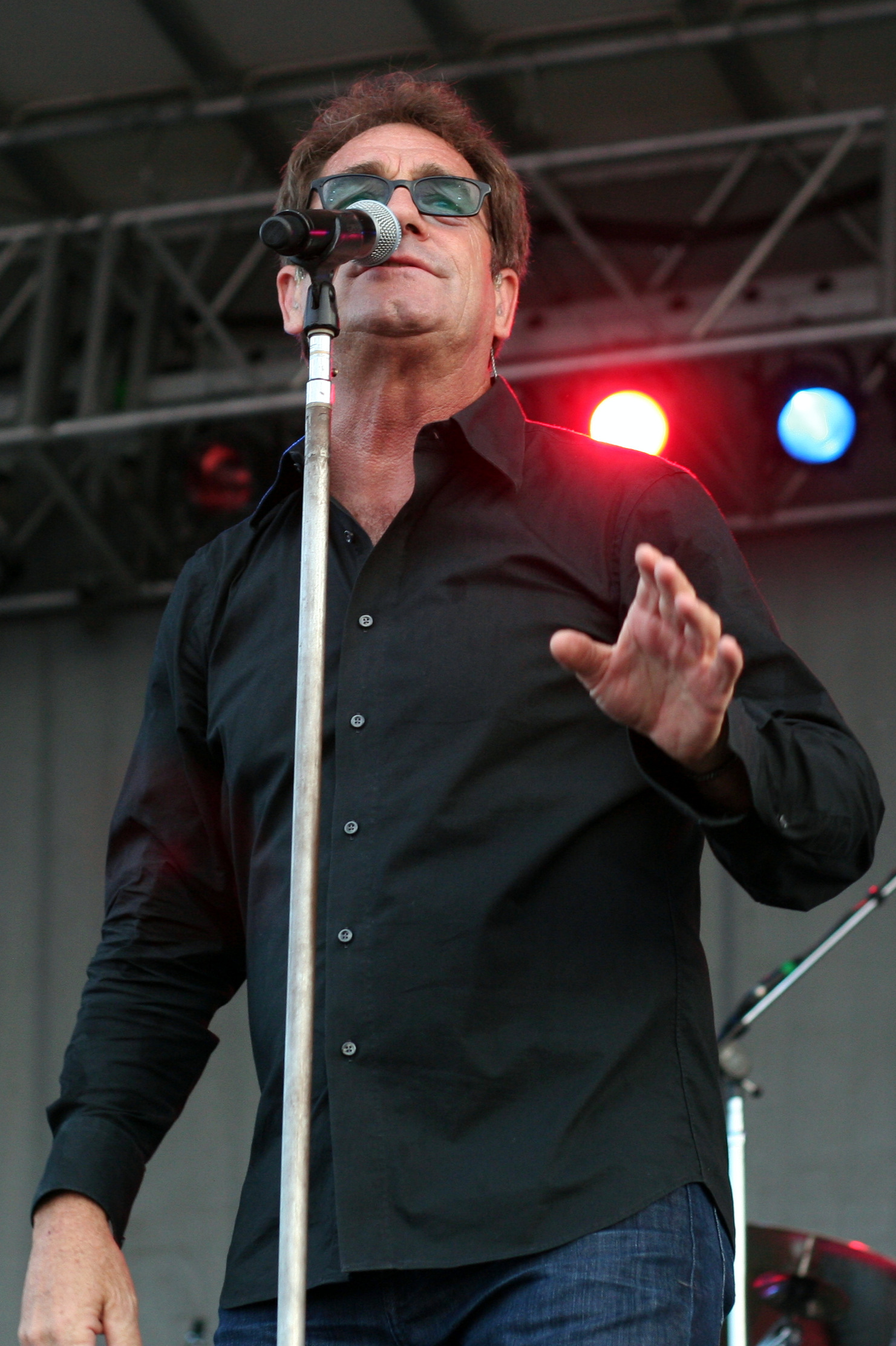
- Lewis in 2013
- Born: Hugh Anthony Cregg III; July 5, 1950 (age 76); New York City, U.S.
- Education: Cornell University
- Occupations: Singer; songwriter; actor
- Years active: 1967–2018 (music); 1984–present (acting)
- Spouse: Sidney Conroy (m. 1983; div. 1989)
- Children: 2
- Relatives: Hugh Cregg (grandfather)
- Musical career
- Genres: Pop rock; synth-pop; rock and roll; blue-eyed soul
- Instruments: Vocals; harmonica
- Labels: Chrysalis; EMI America; Elektra; Jive; Capitol
- Member of: Huey Lewis and the News
- Formerly of: Clover
- Website: hueylewisandthenews.com

Hugh Anthony Cregg III (born July 5, 1950), known professionally as Huey Lewis, is an American actor and former singer-songwriter.

Lewis sang lead and played harmonica for his band, Huey Lewis and the News, until being forced into retirement due to hearing loss in 2018; he also wrote or co-wrote many of the band's songs. The band is perhaps best known for its third, and best-selling, album Sports, and its contribution to the soundtrack of the 1985 feature film Back to the Future. Lewis previously played with the band Clover from 1972 to 1979.

== Early life ==
Huey Lewis was born in New York City. His father, Hugh Anthony Cregg Jr., was an Irish-American from Boston, and his mother, Maria Magdalena Barcinska, was a Polish immigrant, from Warsaw. His grandfather, Hugh Cregg, was district attorney of Essex County, Massachusetts, from 1931 to 1959.

Lewis was raised in Marin County, California, living in Tamalpais Valley and Strawberry, and attending Strawberry Point Elementary School (where he skipped second grade) and Edna Maguire Junior High School in Mill Valley. When he was 13, his parents divorced. He attended and graduated from the Lawrenceville School, a then all-male prep school in New Jersey, in 1967, and he achieved a perfect score of 800 on the math portion of the SAT. He was also an all-state baseball player. Lewis attended Cornell University in Ithaca, New York.

In a podcast interview, he describes that his father "was a doctor by trade, but he was a drummer and a piano player".

His mother had an affair with Beat Generation poet Lew Welch, who became his stepfather. Lewis credits Welch with inspiring him in his early teenage years. His mother was close friends with the Grateful Dead's manager and extended family.

In an interview with David Letterman, Lewis talked about hitchhiking across the country back to New York City and how he learned to play the harmonica while waiting for rides. He talked about hanging out at an airport for three days until he stowed away on a plane to Europe. In later interviews, Lewis would reveal other encounters he had traveling around Europe. While visiting Aberdeen, Scotland, with no money and nowhere to sleep, he claimed that the locals were very hospitable by offering him somewhere to stay. In Madrid, Spain, he became an accomplished blues player as he hitchhiked and supported himself by busking with his harmonica. He gave his first concerts in Madrid, earning enough money to buy a plane ticket back to the US.

Upon his return, Lewis entered the engineering program at Cornell University. While there he made friends with Lance and Larry Hoppen, who later played with Orleans, and with Eddie Tuleja of King Harvest. Initially an active student, Lewis soon lost interest in college. He signed up with a band called Slippery Elm and, in December 1969 during his junior year, he dropped out of Cornell and moved back to the San Francisco Bay Area. He stated that California was where "it was all happening." His aim was to continue playing music, though along the way he also tried other fields of work including landscaping, carpentry, and wedding and event planning, as well as delivering and selling natural foods.

== Music career ==
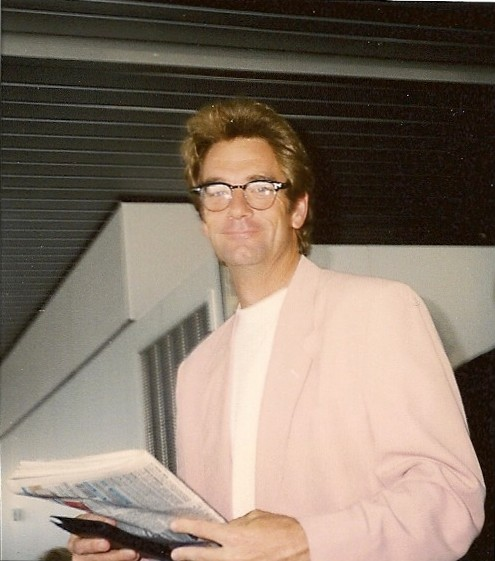
Lewis, early 1990s

In 1971, Lewis joined the Bay Area band Clover. Around this time he took the stage name "Hughie Louis", the spelling of which he would tinker with for some years after. Other members of the band (at various points) included John McFee and Alex Call. Lewis played harmonica and sang lead vocals on a few tunes.

In 1976, after playing in the Bay Area with limited success, Clover went to Los Angeles. They had their big break in a club there when their act was caught by Nick Lowe, who convinced Clover to travel to Great Britain with him. However, Clover arrived in Britain just as their folk-rock sound, known as pub rock in Britain, was being replaced by punk rock.

The two Clover albums produced by Robert John "Mutt" Lange for Phonogram were not successful. By this point the spelling of Cregg's stage name had changed to "Huey Louis"; it is under this spelling that he is billed on both of Clover's albums for Phonogram, although for songwriting credits he is billed as "H. Cregg". The band accompanied Elvis Costello on his debut album, My Aim is True, minus Lewis and Alex Call, the singers. As Lewis told Rolling Stone years later, "there isn’t any harmonica. I tell people, 'All the harmonica that isn’t on the Elvis Costello record was played by me.'" In 1978, the band returned to California, McFee joined the Doobie Brothers, and Clover disbanded. McFee and Lewis, credited as Huey Harp, both appear as guest musicians on the George Hatcher Band's 1977 sophomore album, Talkin' Turkey, produced by Tom Allom.

Under the name "Bluesy Huey Lewis", Lewis played harmonica on Thin Lizzy's 1978 landmark album Live and Dangerous. That same year, he was playing at Uncle Charlie's, a club in Corte Madera, California, doing the "Monday Night Live" spot along with future members of the News. At this point, he had adopted the "Huey Lewis" spelling, and the band was billed as Huey Lewis and the American Express. After recording the song "Exodisco" (a disco version of the theme from the film Exodus) simply as American Express, Lewis landed a singles contract from Phonogram, and Bob Brown became his manager.

The band played a few gigs (including an opening for Van Morrison), before adding new guitarist Chris Hayes to the line-up. On Brown's advice, they changed their name again to Huey Lewis and The News. After a failed self-titled debut in 1980, the band finally broke through to Top 40 success with the gold album Picture This (1982). It rose to No. 13 on the albums chart thanks to the Mutt Lange-penned "Do You Believe in Love" (No. 7), the band's first hit.

The band's third LP, Sports (1983), is one of the best-selling pop releases of all time. It became a No. 1 hit in 1984 and had multi-platinum success in 1985. Four singles from the album reached the top-10 of the Billboard Hot 100: "Heart and Soul" reached No. 8, while "I Want a New Drug", "The Heart of Rock & Roll", and "If This Is It" all reached No. 6.

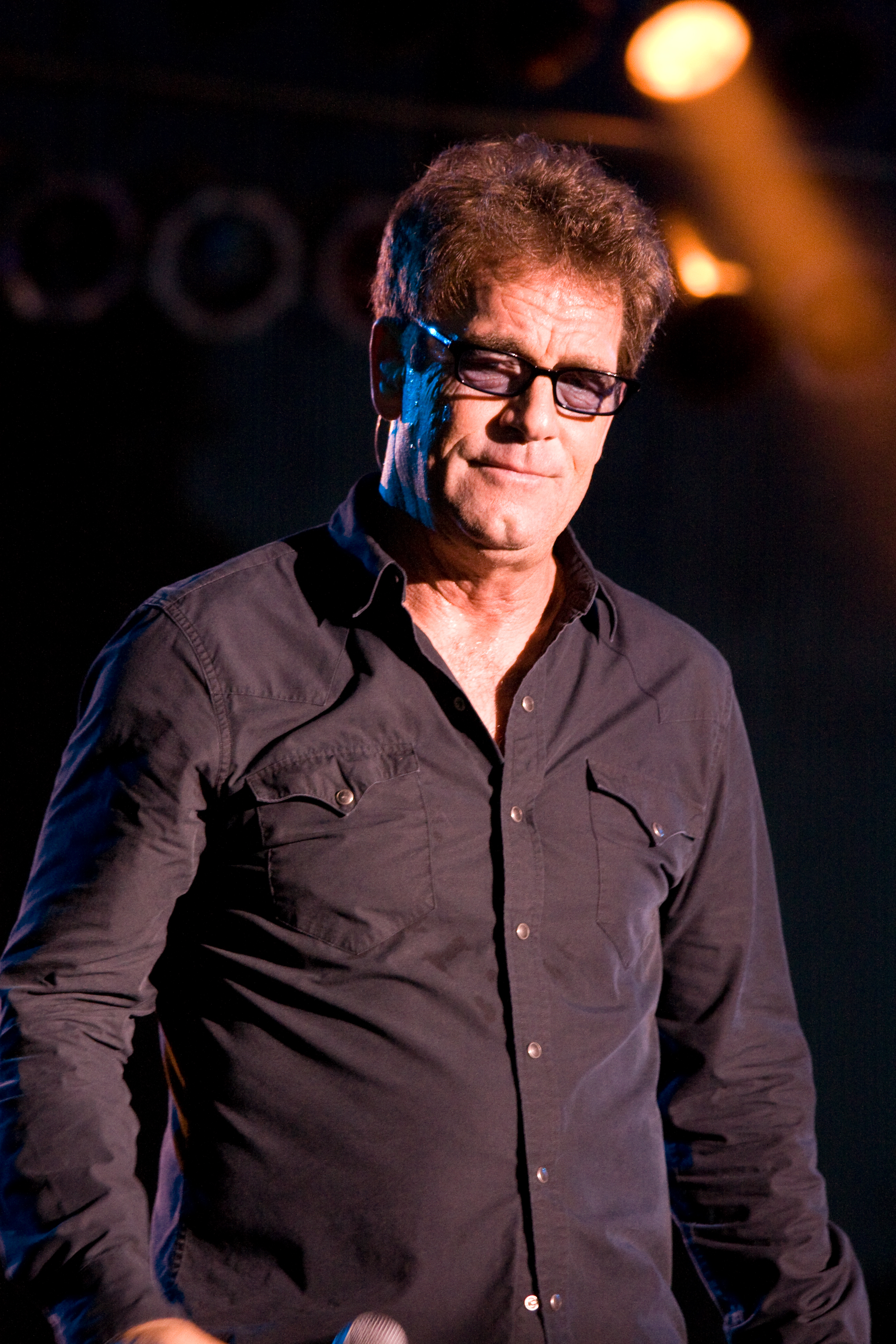
Lewis in 2009

Lewis knew Nick Lowe and Dave Edmunds from having played harmonica on their 1979 albums (Labour of Lust and Repeat When Necessary) and produced Lowe's 1985 version of "I Knew the Bride (When She Used to Rock and Roll)". He later produced several songs (including one where he sang backup and played harmonica) on Bruce Hornsby & The Range's debut album, The Way It Is. Hornsby thanked him by writing the song "Jacob's Ladder", a No. 1 single from the News' next album Fore!

His song "The Power of Love" was a No. 1 U.S. hit and was featured in the 1985 film Back to the Future, for which they also recorded the song, "Back in Time". Lewis has a cameo appearance in the film as a faculty member who rejects Marty McFly's band's audition for the school's "Battle of the Bands" contest. As an inside joke, the piece the band plays is an instrumental heavy metal version of "The Power of Love". Lewis plays the audition committee leader, who, after glancing at the other, equally unimpressed fellow faculty members, picks up the megaphone and says, "Hold it, fellas ... I'm afraid you're just too darn loud. Next, please". A poster for the album Sports is hanging on Marty's wall when he awakes at the end of the movie. "The Power of Love" was nominated for an Academy Award.

Following the success of "The Power of Love" and Back to the Future, Huey Lewis and the News released their fourth studio album, Fore! in 1986. Fore! followed the success of Sports and reached No. 1 on the Billboard 200. The album spawned the No. 1 singles, "Stuck with You" and "Jacob's Ladder" as well as the mainstream rock hit "Hip to Be Square". In all, the album had five top-10 singles on the Billboard Hot 100 and was certified triple platinum.

Lewis and his bandmates performed on USA for Africa's 1985 fund-raising single "We Are the World". The remainder of the 1980s and early 1990s were mostly spent touring and recording fourteen top-20 Billboard Hot 100 hits and releasing two more hit albums: Small World (1988), which reached number 11 on the charts, and Hard at Play (1991) which peaked at number 27. Lewis had a planned solo album titled Back in Blue that was canceled in the mid-1990s due to living arrangement issues on the part of Lewis. One of the songs from that cancelled project, "100 Years From Now", was later used for the compilation album Time Flies... The Best Of.

Lewis has sung with Chicago-based progressive jam band Umphrey's McGee at several shows beginning with the 2005 Jammy Awards and is featured on two tracks of their album Safety in Numbers.

On February 13, 2007, Lewis was interviewed on the podcast series Stuck in the '80s. During the interview, he revealed that the band had written several new songs that they planned to record in 2008. He also stated that, given how much the industry has changed since their last album, he was unsure how they would sell the new material.

During a show at the California State Fair on August 21, 2007, Lewis was named Sacramento's Musician of the Year by the fair's general manager and presented with a gold statue of the California state bear.

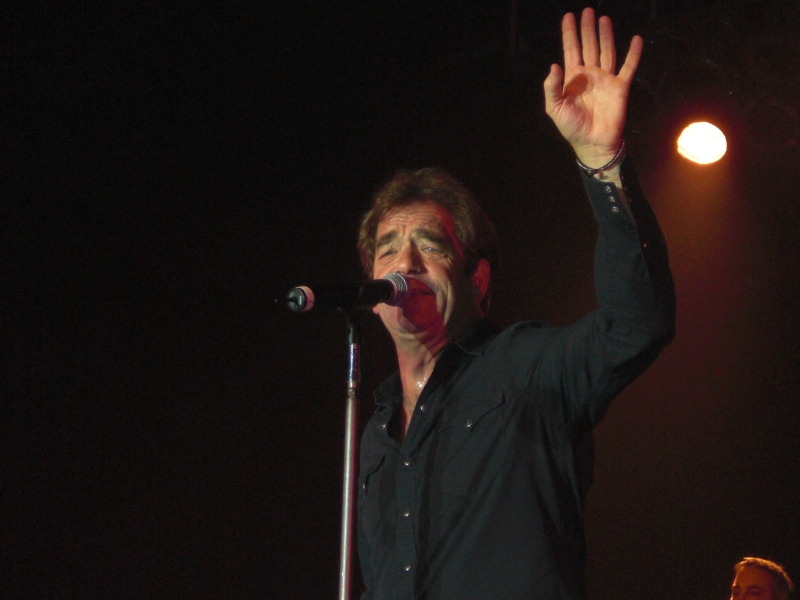
Lewis performing in Nashville, Tennessee, November 2008

Lewis recorded a duet version of "Workin' for a Livin'" with Garth Brooks, which was included on Brooks's three-disc set The Ultimate Hits, in late 2007.

On July 4, 2008, the eve of his 58th birthday, Huey Lewis and the News were the opening act for the annual A Capitol Fourth celebration on the west lawn of the U.S. Capitol in Washington, D.C. More than a half million people attended and was broadcast live on PBS. The band performed "The Heart of Rock & Roll", "The Power of Love" and "Workin' for a Livin'".

On May 29, 2011, Lewis played the annual Summer Camp Music Festival in Chillicothe, Illinois, along with Umphrey's McGee. They were billed as Huey Lewis and The Rumors. Together they played covers as well as songs from both their respective catalogs.

On April 2, 2013, Lewis appeared on the ABC television series Dancing with the Stars, where he performed "The Heart of Rock & Roll" in celebration of the 30th anniversary release of Sports and a concert tour with the News.

On April 13, 2018, Lewis announced that he had been diagnosed with Ménière's disease, and that he "couldn't hear well enough to sing". As a result, the remaining shows scheduled for the 2018 tour were cancelled.

In November 2023, it was announced that the musical The Heart of Rock and Roll featuring the band's music would debut on Broadway in March 2024. Lewis has been involved in the development of the show since 2018.

In February 2025, Lewis was the inaugural inductee of the People’s Music Hall of Fame.

== Acting career ==
After Lewis's cameo appearance as a teacher in Back to the Future, more substantial roles followed, including Vern Miller in Robert Altman's ensemble feature, Short Cuts, and Ricky Dean in Duets. He has performed in occasional television roles as well, including One Tree Hill, The King of Queens and a recurring character on Hot in Cleveland. Lewis provides the voice of Bulworth the junkyard dog in the animated series Puppy Dog Pals.

In 2013, he played himself in a parody of American Psycho with "Weird Al" Yankovic.

On October 21, 2015, on an episode of Jimmy Kimmel Live, Lewis reprised his role from Back to the Future in a segment where Marty McFly and Doc Brown arrive in the time machine and talk to the host.

On February 12, 2021, he played himself on an episode of The Blacklist.

== Lawsuit ==
In 1985, Lewis sued Ray Parker Jr. over similarities between Parker's theme for the 1984 movie Ghostbusters and Lewis's "I Want a New Drug". The case was settled out of court, with the parties agreeing to keep the settlement secret. In 2001, Parker sued Lewis, alleging that Lewis had discussed the settlement in a Behind the Music episode in violation of their nondisclosure agreement.

== Personal life ==
Lewis lives on a ranch near Stevensville, Montana. He considers it his permanent residence.

He married his manager's secretary, Sidney Conroy, in 1983 in Hawaii. They separated six years later. They have a daughter and a son.

In April 2018, Lewis stated that he had hearing loss as a result of Ménière's disease, and canceled all upcoming tour dates. He remarked in 2025 that his hearing loss had worsened to the point of total deafness and that a cochlear implant had restored enough hearing for him to hear speech, but that he would likely never be able to hear or perform music again.

== Recording credits ==
See Huey Lewis and the News discography for albums and singles by the band. Below are specific contributions by Lewis as a solo artist.

=== Album appearances ===
- 1975: Don Harrison Band Don Harrison Band; harmonica
- 1977: Talkin' Turkey George Hatcher Band; harmonica
- 1978: Live and Dangerous Thin Lizzy; harmonica
- 1979: Labour of Lust Nick Lowe; harmonica
- 1979: Repeat When Necessary Dave Edmunds; harmonica
- 1979: The Day the Earth Caught Fire City Boy; harmonica
- 1980: Solo in Soho, Phil Lynott; harmonica
- 1985: Back to the Future Soundtrack; producer
- 1985: USA for Africa: We Are the World; harmonica, vocals, producer
- 1986: The Way It Is Bruce Hornsby & the Range; harmonica, vocals, producer
- 1986: Montana Cafe Hank Williams Jr.; duet on "You Can't Judge a Book (By Looking at the Cover)"
- 1987: Freight Train Heart Jimmy Barnes; harmonica, background vocals
- 1988: Scenes from the Southside Bruce Hornsby & the Range; harmonica
- 1988: Oliver & Company soundtrack; performer on "Once Upon a Time in New York City"
- 1991: Live at Slim's, Vol. 1 Joe Louis Walker; harmonica
- 1993: A Tribute to the Music of Bob Wills & the Texas Playboys Asleep at the Wheel; vocals on "Ida Red" and "Hubbin' It"
- 1994: Unknown Territory Dick Dale; harmonica
- 1995: Come Together: America Salutes the Beatles; performer on "Oh! Darling"
- 1997: Marching to Mars Sammy Hagar; harmonica on "Little White Lie"
- 1997: Kill My Brain Nick Gravenites; harmonica
- 2000: Duets soundtrack, performer on three tracks
- 2005: Wrapped Around Chicago: New Years at the Riv Umphrey's McGee; guest performer on "Bad Is Bad"
- 2006: Safety in Numbers Umphrey's McGee; vocals and harmonica on "Women Wine and Song"; harmonica on "End of the Road"
- 2007: Gospel Duets with Treasured Friends Brenda Lee; performer on "Oh Happy Day"
- 2008: A Long Way from Tupelo Paul Thorn; harmonica
- 2009: Great American Soulbook Tower of Power; performer on "634-5789"
- 2009: Songs from Here Lazybones; harmonica on "Perfect Life"
- 2010: Space Age Blues Devon Allman's Honeytribe; harmonica on "Could Get Dangerous"
- 2014: Southbound The Doobie Brothers; performer on "Long Train Runnin'" (with Toby Keith)
- 2016: Frankie Miller's Double Take; duet with Frankie Miller on "Way Past Midnight"
- 2016: S.O.S. 2: Save Our Soul: Soul on a Mission Marc Broussard; guest performer on "These Arms Of Mine"
- 2018: King of the Road: A Tribute to Roger Miller with Asleep at the Wheel; vocals on "Chug-a-Lug"
- 2023: Thin Lizzy - Live and Dangerous At Hammersmith 14 Nov 1976, Thin Lizzy; harmonica

=== Singles ===
The following table denotes singles that Lewis has charted with solo credits:

List of charting singles by Huey Lewis
Year	Single	Peak chart positions			Album
Year	Single	US Bub.	US AC	US Country	Album
2000	"Cruisin'" (with Gwyneth Paltrow)	9	1	—	Duets (soundtrack)
2008	"Workin' for a Livin'" (with Garth Brooks)	15	—	19	The Ultimate Hits (Garth Brooks album)
"—" denotes releases that did not chart

== Filmography ==
Year	Title	Role	Notes
1985	Back to the Future	Band audition judge	Cameo, uncredited
1990	The Real Story of...	Scratch the Cat	Voice, episode: "The Rise and Fall of Humpty Dumpty"; Canadian children's series of animated short videos
1992	Is There Life Out There	Reba McEntire's husband	Music video
1993	Short Cuts	Vern Miller	
1996	Land of Milk & Honey		
1998	Sphere	Helicopter pilot	
1998	Shadow of Doubt	Al Gordon	Showtime movie
1998	Dead Husbands	Dalton Phillips	TV movie, uncredited
2000	Duets	Ricky Dean	His song "Cruisin'" became a No. 1 hit
2001	Who Wants to Be a Millionaire?	Himself	He first appeared on July 20. The klaxon called time after his $1,000 question, and he returned on the 22nd. He walked away with $125,000.
2002	Just Shoot Me!	Gary Rosenberg	Episode: "The Boys in the Band"
2002	.com for Murder	Agent Matheson	
2004	One Tree Hill	Jim James	2 episodes
2006	The King of Queens	Himself	Episode: "Hartford Wailer"
2007	Graduation	Mike	
2010–15	Hot in Cleveland	Johnny Revere	4 episodes
2011	The Cleveland Show	Guy who looks like Huey Lewis	Episode: "Die Semi-Hard"
2013	Pocket Full of Soul: The Harmonica Documentary	Narrator	
2017–23	Puppy Dog Pals	Bulworth	Voice; recurring role
2021	The Blacklist	Himself	Episode: "The Wellstone Agency"
