= Huey Lewis and the News =

American rock band

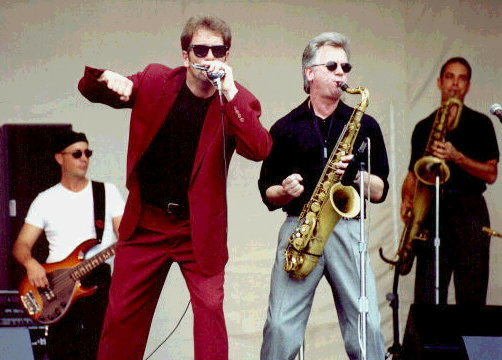
- Huey Lewis and the News in 2006

Background information
- Also known as: Huey Lewis & The American Express (1979–1980)
- Origin: San Francisco, California, U.S.
- Genres: Rock; new wave; rhythm & blues; doo-wop
- Years active: 1979–present; indefinite hiatus since 2018
- Labels: Chrysalis, Elektra, BMG
- Past members: Huey Lewis; Johnny Colla; Sean Hopper; Bill Gibson; Chris Hayes; Mario Cipollina; John Pierce; Stef Burns; James Harrah; Marvin McFadden; Rob Sudduth; Johnnie Bamont; Ron Stallings; Bill Hinds
- Website: www.hueylewisandthenews.com

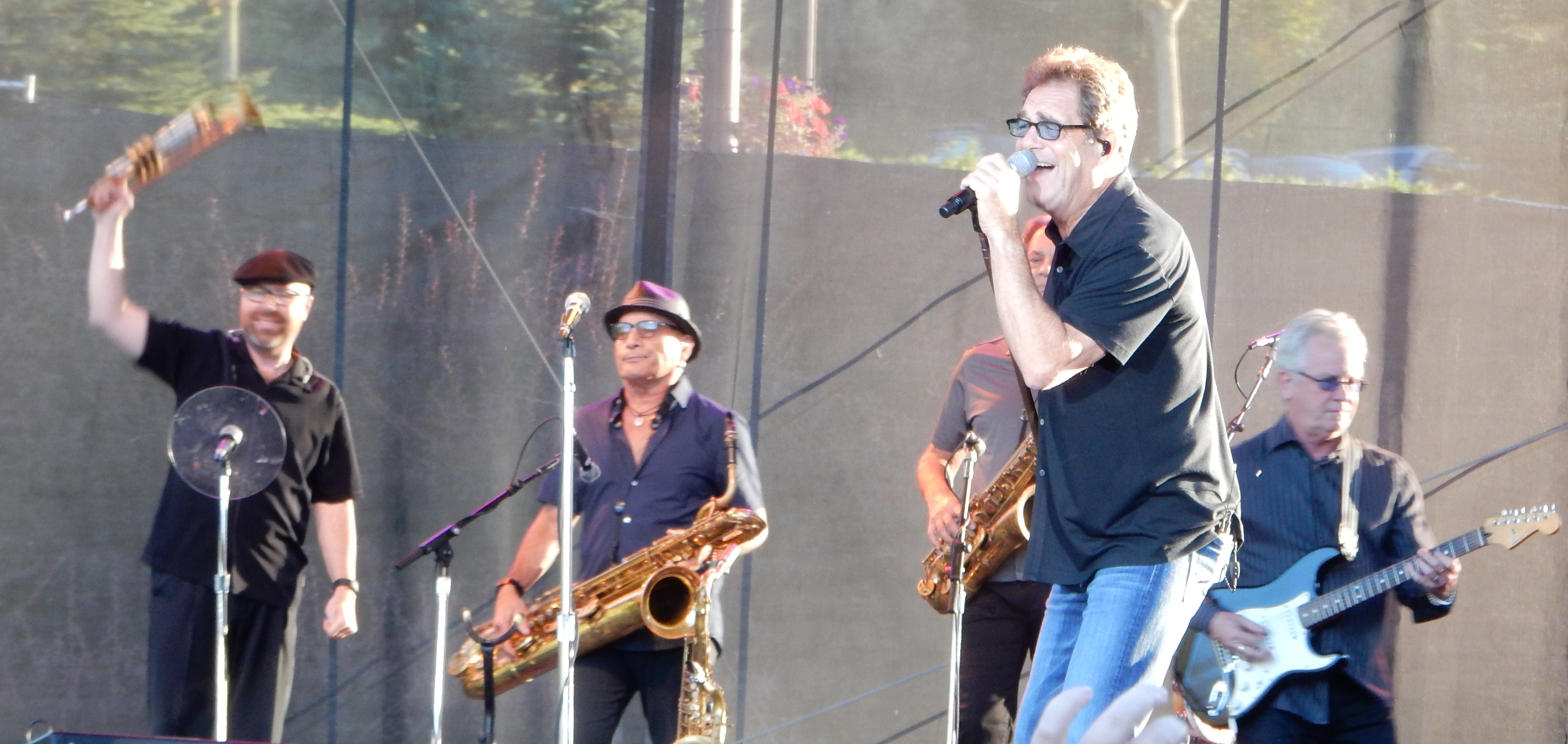
Huey Lewis & The News performing at Snoqualmie Casino in 2016

Huey Lewis and the News (initially known as Huey Lewis & The American Express) were an American rock band from San Francisco, California. They had a run of hit singles during the 1980s and early 1990s, eventually achieving 19 top ten singles across the Billboard Hot 100, Adult Contemporary, and Mainstream Rock charts. Their sound draws upon earlier pop, rhythm & blues and doo-wop artists, and their own material has been labeled as blue-eyed soul, new wave, power pop, and roots rock.

The group's first two albums were well-received, with Huey Lewis's personal charisma as a frontman gaining notice, but they struggled to find a wide audience. Their most successful album, Sports, was released in 1983. The album, along with its music videos being featured on MTV, catapulted the group to worldwide fame. Their popularity significantly expanded when the song "The Power of Love" was featured in the 1985 film Back to the Future. "The Power of Love" reached number one on the Billboard Hot 100 singles chart and was nominated for the Academy Award for Best Original Song at the 58th Academy Awards. The group's 1986 album, Fore!, produced two further number-one singles in "Stuck with You" and "Jacob's Ladder". The band's other top-ten hits, all from the 1980s, include "Do You Believe in Love", "Heart and Soul", "I Want a New Drug", "The Heart of Rock & Roll", "If This Is It", "Hip to Be Square", "I Know What I Like", "Doing It All for My Baby" and "Perfect World".

Though not formally disbanded, the group has been inactive since 2018 when Lewis was diagnosed with Ménière's disease, an inner ear disorder. In 2020, they released Weather, which contains songs the band recorded prior to Lewis's hearing loss.

== History ==
=== Formation ===
In 1972, singer/harmonica player Huey Lewis and keyboardist Sean Hopper joined the Bay Area jazz-funk band Clover. Clover had recorded several albums in the 1970s, and in the middle of the decade transplanted themselves to Britain to become part of the UK pub rock scene.

Without Lewis, they eventually became the backing band for Elvis Costello's first album My Aim Is True. Lewis also worked with Irish band Thin Lizzy, contributing harmonica to the song "Baby Drives Me Crazy", recorded onstage for the Live and Dangerous album. Thin Lizzy bassist/vocalist Phil Lynott introduces Lewis by name during the song. The band returned to the Bay Area by the end of the 1970s.

Clover's main competition in the Bay Area jazz-funk scene was a band called Soundhole, whose members included drummer Bill Gibson, saxophonist/rhythm guitarist Johnny Colla, and bassist Mario Cipollina (brother of John Cipollina of Quicksilver Messenger Service). Like Clover, Soundhole had spent time backing singer Van Morrison. After signing a singles contract from Phonogram Records in 1978, Huey Lewis joined Soundhole veterans Hopper, Gibson, Colla, and Cipollina to form a new group, Huey Lewis & The American Express.

Although they played gigs under this name, in 1979, they recorded and released a single simply as "American Express". The single, "Exodisco" (a disco version of the theme from the film Exodus) was largely ignored. The B-side of this record, "Kick Back", is a song that had previously been performed live by Lewis and his former band, Clover. In 1979, the band was joined by lead guitarist Chris Hayes and moved to Chrysalis Records, which occurred after their demo tape was heard by Pablo Cruise manager Bob Brown, who helped them land a record deal with the label. Chrysalis did not like the name American Express, fearing trademark infringement charges from the credit card company, so the band changed its name.

Later in 1980, the band released their first studio album, a self-titled LP, Huey Lewis and the News. It went largely unnoticed. In 1982, the band released their second studio album, the self-produced Picture This. The album turned gold, fueled by the breakout success of the hit single "Do You Believe in Love", written by former Clover producer "Mutt" Lange. Largely because of the single, the album remained on the Billboard 200 album chart for 35 weeks and peaked at No. 13. The follow-up singles from Picture This, "Hope You Love Me Like You Say You Do" and "Workin' for a Livin'", followed, with limited success.

=== Mainstream success ===
Due to record label delays on the release of their third studio album, Sports, Huey Lewis and the News returned in late 1983 to touring small clubs in a bus to promote the record (eventually known as the "Workin' for a Livin'" tour). The new album initially hit number six in the U.S. when first released. However, Sports slowly became a number-one hit in 1984, and went multi-platinum in 1985, thanks to the band's frequent touring and a series of videos that received heavy MTV airplay. Four singles from the album reached the top 10 of the Billboard Hot 100: "Heart and Soul" reached number eight, while "I Want a New Drug", "The Heart of Rock & Roll", and "If This Is It" all reached number six. The album has sold over 10 million copies in the U.S. alone.

At the beginning of 1985, the band participated in the all-star USA for Africa charity single "We Are the World", with Lewis taking a solo vocal. The song topped music charts throughout the world and became the fastest-selling American pop single in history. They were to play the Philadelphia leg of the Live Aid benefit concert that July, but pulled out two weeks before the concert over concerns that the money raised by the single and other efforts had not been spent to benefit Ethiopian famine victims, earning them vociferous criticism from USA for Africa organizer Harry Belafonte. A year later a Spin article suggested that much of the money raised from the single and concert had been misspent.

Their song "The Power of Love" was a number-one U.S. hit and featured in the 1985 film Back to the Future, for which they also recorded the song, "Back in Time". Lewis has a cameo appearance in the film as a faculty member who rejects Marty McFly's band's audition for the school's "Battle of the Bands" contest. As an inside joke, the piece the band plays is an instrumental hard rock version of "The Power of Love" (Lewis's response: "Hold it, fellas ... I'm afraid you're just too darn loud"). "The Power of Love" was nominated for Best Original Song at the 58th Academy Awards in 1986.

Following the success of "The Power of Love" and Back to the Future, Huey Lewis and the News released their fourth studio album, Fore!, in 1986. Fore! followed the success of Sports and reached number-one on the Billboard 200. The album spawned the number-one singles, "Stuck with You" and "Jacob's Ladder", as well as the mainstream rock hit "Hip to Be Square". In all, the album had five top-ten singles on the Billboard Hot 100 and was certified triple platinum.

The band continued to tour throughout 1987, and released Small World in 1988. After the previous two multi-platinum albums, Small World was considered "noticeably weaker", peaking at number 11 and only going platinum. The album had one top-ten single, "Perfect World", which reached number three on the pop chart.

At the end of the Small World tour in 1989, the band took a break from recording and heavy touring, and parted ways with Chrysalis Records. In 1991, they released Hard at Play on the EMI label in the US and Chrysalis in the UK, which went back to the R&B/rock sound of their earlier albums, and released the hit singles "Couple Days Off" (number 11) and "It Hit Me Like a Hammer" (number 21).

The band once again changed labels, this time signing with Elektra Records, releasing a cover album in 1994 called Four Chords & Several Years Ago, featuring doo-wop and rock songs from the 1950s and 1960s. The album charted on the Billboard 200 and had two hits on adult contemporary radio.

In early 1996, the band released the greatest hits album Time Flies which focused primarily on the releases from Picture This, Sports, and Fore!, and included four new tracks.

=== The 21st century ===
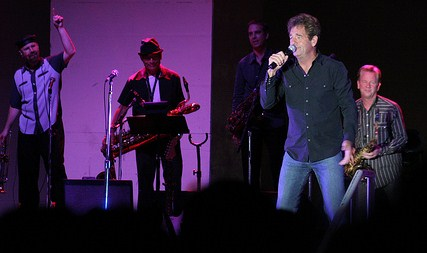
The band playing at Brighton Beach in August 2008

The band's lineup has changed moderately since its heyday. Bassist Mario Cipollina left the band in 1995, and was replaced by John Pierce. Tower of Power, which often served as the band's touring horn section in the 1980s, ceased their work with the band in 1994. Horn players Marvin McFadden, Ron Stallings and Rob Sudduth joined the group in their place as "The Sports Section". In 2001, Chris Hayes retired to spend more time with his family after performing on the album Plan B. Guitarists Stef Burns became Hayes's successor, while James Harrah filled in for Burns occasionally. On April 13, 2009, touring saxophonist Ron Stallings died from multiple myeloma.

In 2001, the News released their first album in seven years, Plan B, on Jive Records. It only briefly made the charts, with the lead single, "Let Her Go & Start Over", becoming a minor adult contemporary hit. In December 2004, Huey Lewis and the News recorded their first live album, Live at 25, at the Sierra Nevada Brewing Company in Chico, California, commemorating the band's 25th anniversary. In 2008, they recorded the theme song to the action-comedy film Pineapple Express at the request of Seth Rogen. The song is played over the end credits of the film and appears on the film's soundtrack album.

The band returned to the studio in 2010, recording their first album in nearly a decade. The album, entitled Soulsville, is a Stax Records tribute album recorded at the legendary Ardent Studios. They continued to tour regularly, playing around 70 dates a year, until 2018, when the band halted all touring after it was revealed that Lewis had Ménière's disease, an inner ear disorder. In January 2019, Huey Lewis and the News signed with BMG Rights Management. On February 14, 2020, as Harrah became an official member, they released Weather (their first studio album of new songs since Plan B), which contains songs the band recorded prior to Lewis's hearing loss.

On November 1, 2023, a new musical comedy inspired by the hits of Huey Lewis and the News was announced, The Heart of Rock and Roll. A romantic comedy, it contains a number of the band's hits like "Workin' for a Livin'", "Stuck with You" and "If This is It".

In June 2025, Lewis remarked that his hearing loss had worsened to the point of total deafness and while a cochlear implant had restored enough hearing for him to hear speech, it was unlikely that he would be able to hear music or sing ever again.

== "Ghostbusters" song lawsuit ==
In 1984, Ray Parker Jr. was signed by the producers of Ghostbusters to develop the film's title song. Later that year, Huey Lewis and the News sued Parker, citing the similarities between the "Ghostbusters" song and their earlier hit "I Want a New Drug". According to Huey Lewis and the News, this was especially damaging to them since "Ghostbusters" was so popular (it rose to number one on the charts for three weeks). The dispute was ultimately settled out of court. Lewis has stated that his experiences with the producers of Ghostbusters were indirectly responsible for his involvement in the movie Back to the Future (1985).

Parker later filed a suit against Lewis, claiming violation of the agreement to not discuss the settlement publicly.

Lewis broke his silence by dissing Parker in an episode of VH1's "Behind the Music", [in 2001] which prompted Parker to slap him with a lawsuit. "The offensive part was not so much that Ray Parker Jr. had ripped this song off," says Lewis, who goes on to blame the arrogance of music industry execs who thought they could simply pay him off for stealing his melody. "In the end, I suppose they were right. I suppose it was for sale, because, basically, they bought it."

Premiere magazine in 2004 featured an anniversary article about the movie Ghostbusters in which the filmmakers at Columbia Pictures admitted to using the song "I Want a New Drug" as temporary background music in many scenes. They also noted that they had offered to hire Huey Lewis and the News to write the main theme but the band had declined. Lewis, in the 2001 Behind the Music special, said the band had declined the filmmakers' offer because an upcoming concert tour to promote their hugely successful Sports album left no time to write a main theme for a movie. The filmmakers then gave film footage – with the Huey Lewis song in the background – to Ray Parker Jr., to aid Parker in writing the theme song.

== American Psycho soundtrack ==
The band is mentioned numerous times in Bret Easton Ellis's 1991 novel American Psycho, and its subsequent film adaptation. The chapter in the novel is entitled "Huey Lewis & the News", and consists of an extended essay about the band's recorded output and career. During the scene in the film where the main protagonist, Patrick Bateman, kills his colleague, Paul Allen, with an axe, Bateman plays the song "Hip to Be Square" and waxes lyrical about the band:

"Do you like Huey Lewis & The News? Their early work was a little too 'new-wave' for my taste, but when 'Sports' came out in '83, I think they really came into their own – both commercially and artistically. The whole album has a clear, crisp sound, and a new sheen of consummate professionalism that really gives the songs a big boost. He's been compared to Elvis Costello, but I think Huey has a far more bitter, cynical sense of humor. In '87 [sic], Huey released this, Fore!, their most accomplished album. I think their undisputed masterpiece is 'Hip to Be Square', a song so catchy most people probably don't listen to the lyrics – but they should! Because it's not just about the pleasures of conformity, and the importance of trends, it's also a personal statement about the band itself!"

"Hip to Be Square" was initially intended to be on the soundtrack album, but was removed from the album due to lack of publishing rights. As a result, Koch Records were forced to recall and destroy approximately 100,000 copies of the album. Koch Records president Bob Frank said, "As a result of the violent nature of the film, Huey Lewis's management decided not to give the soundtrack clearance." Lewis's manager Bob Brown claimed that the musician had not seen the film and that "we knew nothing about a soundtrack album. They just went ahead and put the cut on there. I think what they're trying to do is drum up publicity for themselves."

In April 2013, to mark the 30th anniversary of the band's album Sports, comedy video website Funny or Die created a parody of the axe murder scene featuring Huey Lewis as Patrick Bateman and "Weird Al" Yankovic (who parodied "I Want a New Drug" as "I Want a New Duck" years before) as Paul Allen.

== Personnel ==
- Huey Lewis – lead vocals, harmonica (1979–2018)
- Sean Hopper – keyboards, backing vocals (1979–2018)
- Bill Gibson – drums, percussion, backing vocals (1979–2018)
- Johnny Colla – guitar, saxophone, percussion, backing vocals (1979–2018)
- Chris Hayes – guitar, backing vocals (1979–2001)
- Mario Cipollina – bass (1979–1995)
- The Tower of Power Horns (1982, 1984–1988; touring)
- Ron Stallings – tenor saxophone (The Sports Section 1994–2009; died 2009)
- Marvin McFadden – trumpet (The Sports Section 1994–2018)
- Rob Sudduth – tenor saxophone (The Sports Section 1994–2018)
- John Pierce – bass (1995–2018)
- Stef Burns – guitar, backing vocals (2001–2018)
- Bill Hinds – guitar, backing vocals (2001–2016)
- Johnnie Bamont – alto saxophone, baritone saxophone, flute (The Sports Section 2009–2018)
- James Harrah – guitar, backing vocals (2016–2018)

== Discography ==
- Huey Lewis and the News (1980)
- Picture This (1982)
- Sports (1983)
- Fore! (1986)
- Small World (1988)
- Hard at Play (1991)
- Four Chords & Several Years Ago (1994)
- Plan B (2001)
- Soulsville (2010)
- Weather (2020)

== Awards and sales ==
- The band has sold over an estimated 30 million records worldwide, according to an interview with Johnny Colla in 2006.
- Their 1983 album, Sports, has sold 10 million copies in the United States according to the VH1 Behind the Music show on Huey Lewis and the News (though it has only been certified seven times Platinum by the RIAA).
- The Heart of Rock 'n' Roll won the Grammy Award for Best Music Video, Long Form in 1986.
- Also in 1986, the Grammy for Best Pop Performance by a Duo or Group with Vocal was won by "We Are the World" performed by USA for Africa, in which Huey Lewis and the News were participants; however, this award went to the song's producer, Quincy Jones, and not to any of the artists.
- The songs "The Heart of Rock & Roll" and "The Power of Love" were nominated for Grammy Awards for Record of the Year, in 1985 and 1986, respectively.
- "The Power of Love" (from the film Back to the Future) earned Chris Hayes, Johnny Colla and Huey Lewis (the song's composers) an Academy Award nomination for Best Original Song in 1986.
- The band received the award for Best International Group at the 1986 Brit Awards.
- The band's two biggest-selling hits, "The Power of Love" and "I Want a New Drug", were both million-selling singles in the U.S., certified Gold by the RIAA.
- Huey Lewis and the News are the recipients of 30 Californian (formerly Bay Area Music) Awards.
- All five albums released by the band between 1982 and 1991 reached the Top 30 on the Billboard 200 album chart and have been certified either Gold, Platinum, or Multi-platinum.

== See also ==
- Blue-eyed soul
- List of artists who reached number one in the United States
- List of artists who reached number one on the U.S. dance chart
- List of bands from the San Francisco Bay Area
- List of number-one dance hits (United States)
- List of number-one hits (United States)
- New wave music
- Power pop
- Rhythm & blues
