= Johnny Colla =

American musician (born 1952)

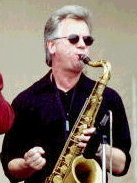
- Colla performing with Huey Lewis and the News in 2006

Background information
- Born: John Victor Colla; July 2, 1952 (age 74); Sacramento, California, United States
- Genres: Rock
- Occupation: Musician
- Instruments: Guitar, saxophone, vocals

John Victor Colla (born 1952) is an American musician (playing the guitar and saxophone), singer and songwriter. He is a founding member of the American rock band Huey Lewis and the News. He has been heavily involved in the San Francisco Bay Area music scene for decades, having been in several other bands, including Rubicon, Sly and the Family Stone, Van Morrison, Sound Hole, and Johnny Colla & The Lucky Devils. Colla has two children, Allison Colla and Ryan Colla.

== Career ==
The first bands that Colla was involved with from Fairfield, California, were The Furlanders, The Yewess Army and Cottonmouth. In the early 1970s, he moved to Marin County, California and joined Sound Hole as a singer and saxophonist. Sound Hole was successful at a local level and became Van Morrison's backing band for a time. Other members of Sound Hole were drummer Bill Gibson and bassist Mario Cipollina, who also eventually joined with Huey and The News. Sound Hole was the major local competition to Huey's band Clover. After Sound Hole, Colla was enlisted as sax man/arranger with Sly and the Family Stone, recording and touring with Sly for a few years. In the late 1970s, Sound Hole and Clover alumni merged to form a new group, the American Express, which later became known as Huey Lewis and the News. For the News, Colla became saxophonist, rhythm guitarist, backing singer and songwriter.

Colla was drawn to San Francisco from the Sacramento Valley during the 1960s Summer of Love. Like many others, Colla patronized the Avalon Ballroom and the Fillmore Auditorium.

"I moved to Marin because that's where all the musicians moved after the San Francisco scene blew up. For a start-up musician in the 1970s, it was a hot-bed of musical activity; a great place to be and be heard." He says. "Then I beat the odds. We not only started a great band, but actually became successful at it!"

Colla co-wrote hit songs such as "The Heart of Rock & Roll", "If This Is It", "The Power of Love", and "Back in Time". Lewis and Colla co-produced the band's albums Plan B (2001) and Weather (2020).

Colla embarked upon a solo career, releasing his first solo album Lucky Devil in the mid 1990s. He released his second solo album, I Hear Voices, in 2012, which takes a more vocal approach than Lucky Devil.

== Discography ==
Colla also produced or performed on these records:

- Patrick Simmons, Arcade (Elektra Records, 1982) songwriter, "Don't Make Me Do It"
- Heart (EMD/Capitol Records, 1985), backing vocals on "Nothin' at All" and "These Dreams" on Heart
- Nick Lowe album – The Rose of England (CBS Records, 1985) backing singer "I Knew the Bride (When She Used to Rock 'n' Roll)"
- Back to the Streets: Celebrating the Music of Don Covay (Shanachie Records, 1993) lead vocal (duet) with Arlene Smith, "Letter Full of Tears"
- Pablo Cruise, Out of Our Hands (A&M Records, 1993) saxophone solo, "Talk to Me Right"
- Yoshihiro ishikawa, Peace (Pioneer ldc, Japan, 1993) produced, recorded, arranged and performed on several tracks
- A tribute to Curtis Mayfield People Get Ready (shanachie records, 1993) produced, arranged and sang with Huey Lewis and the News on "It's Alright"
- Yoshihiro Ishikawa Love (Pioneer ldc, Japan, 1994) produced, recorded, arranged and performed on several tracks
- Doc Kupka's Strokeland Superband Kick It Up A Step (Strokeland Records) backing vocals and vocal arrangement, "Bittersweet with a Ray of Hope"
- Holiday Heroes compilation cd Holiday Heroes (Soul Purpose Records, 1995) songwriter, lead vocal, producer, "My Christmas Wish"
- Grace Slick, Software (RCA Records) backing vocals, "Through the Window", "It Just Won't Stop"
- Deborah Coleman, Soft Place to Fall (Blind Pig Records, 2000) songwriter, "Don't Lie to Me"
- Lucky Devil (1990s)
- I Hear Voices (2012)
