= Fore! =

Studio album by Huey Lewis and the News
- Released: August 20, 1986
- Recorded: 1985–1986
- Studios: Studio D Recording and The Plant, Sausalito, California; Fantasy Studios, Berkeley, California.
- Genres: Rock; pop rock
- Length: 37:53
- Label: Chrysalis
- Producer: Huey Lewis and the News

Huey Lewis and the News chronology
Sports (1983)	Fore! (1986)	Small World (1988)

Singles from Fore!
- 1. "Stuck with You" Released: July 16, 1986; 2. "Hip to Be Square" Released: October 6, 1986; 3. "Jacob's Ladder" Released: January 5, 1987; 4. "I Know What I Like" Released: March 23, 1987; 5. "Simple as That" Released: 1987 (UK only); 6. "Doing It All for My Baby" Released: June 29, 1987

Professional ratings
Review scores
Source	Rating
AllMusic	3/5 stars
Record Mirror	2/5
Rolling Stone	(favorable)
The Rolling Stone Album Guide	2/5 stars

Fore! is the fourth studio album by American rock band Huey Lewis and the News, released on August 20, 1986. The album was a commercial success, peaking at number one on the Billboard 200 and went on to score five top-ten Billboard Hot 100 singles, including the number-one hits "Stuck with You" and "Jacob's Ladder". The album was certified three-times platinum by the Recording Industry Association of America.

== Music and lyrics ==
"Jacob's Ladder" was originally meant for a Bruce Hornsby album that Huey Lewis was producing. Hornsby did not like the arrangement for the song, so suggested Lewis record it with The News.

"Doing It All for My Baby" was written by Mike Duke and Phil Cody. Duke wrote the song and then recorded vocals himself (the band playing backing parts and instruments), with the intention of getting a record contract for his own solo career. When that plan fell through, Lewis decided to record a version with his own vocals for the album.

Lewis stated he originally wrote the lyrics for "Hip to Be Square" in a third person perspective, "He used to be a renegade..." He referenced the book Bobos in Paradise in describing the song's inspiration, explaining that the song was about the "phenomenon where people from the '60s started to drop back in, cut their hair, work out, that kind of crap, but they kept their bohemian tastes. ... bourgeois bohemians." Lewis later modified the lyrics to be in the first person as he believed it would enhance the joke, but stated this had unintentionally led to the interpretation of the song as an "anthem for square people".

According to Lewis, the album track "Forest for the Trees" was written for and about kids struggling with life issues as an uplifting message for them. Lewis based it off the letters he received from young fans at the time who would talk about how important his music was to them.

"The Power of Love", originally from the soundtrack of the 1985 film Back to the Future, is included as a bonus track on international editions of the album. The song was the band's first chart-topper on the Billboard Hot 100. The critical reception of the album was mixed with Glenn O'Brien in Spin noting that 'what saves it for me is that songs are good songs. And Huey still sings with heart and soul'.

== Album cover ==
The wall that Lewis and the members of the band stand against on the album's cover is a wall from Tamalpais High School in Mill Valley, California. Band members Bill Gibson, Sean Hopper and Mario Cipollina went to this school together.

== In popular culture ==
The album is referenced in the film American Psycho. The main character Patrick Bateman, while talking to Paul Allen, gives a review of the album, discussing the band's viewpoint, intent, and how specifically the song "Hip to Be Square" espouses "not just the pleasures of conformity and the importance of trends, but [the song]'s also a personal statement about the band itself" with a catchy 1980s beat. He goes on to state it is "the group's most accomplished album".

== Track listing ==
Side one
No.	Title	Writer(s)	Length
1.	"Jacob's Ladder"	Bruce Hornsby; John Hornsby	3:33
2.	"Stuck with You"	Chris Hayes; Huey Lewis	4:29
3.	"Whole Lotta Lovin'"	Johnny Colla; Lewis	3:30
4.	"Doing It All for My Baby"	Phil Cody; Mike Duke	3:39
5.	"Hip to Be Square"	Bill Gibson; Sean Hopper; Lewis	4:05

Side two
No.	Title	Writer(s)	Length
1.	"I Know What I Like"	Hayes; Lewis	3:59
2.	"I Never Walk Alone"	Reed Nielsen	3:44
3.	"Forest for the Trees"	Jerome Fletcher; Gibson; Lewis; Kenny Loggins	3:28
4.	"Naturally"	Colla; Lewis	2:52
5.	"Simple as That"	Stephen "Doc" Kupka; Emilio Castillo; Frank Biner	4:27
Total length:			37:53

- The international edition includes "The Power of Love" as a bonus track, inserted as track 3 of side 2.

== Personnel ==
Huey Lewis and the News

- Huey Lewis – vocals, harmonica
- Johnny Colla – saxophone, guitar, backing vocals
- Chris Hayes – lead guitar, backing vocals
- Mario Cipollina – bass
- Bill Gibson – drums, percussion, backing vocals
- Sean Hopper – keyboards, backing vocals

Additional personnel

- The Tower of Power Horns (4, 10):
  - Greg Adams – trumpet, horn arrangements
  - Emilio Castillo – tenor saxophone
  - Richard Elliot – tenor saxophone
  - Stephen "Doc" Kupka – baritone saxophone (4, 5, 10), backing vocals (5, 6)
  - Lee Thornburg – trumpet
- David Jenkins – backing vocals (1)
- Ralph Arista – backing vocals (5, 6)
- Dwight Clark – backing vocals (5, 6)
- Mike Duke – backing vocals (5, 6)
- Riki Ellison – backing vocals (5, 6)
- Jerome Fletcher – backing vocals (5, 6)
- Ronnie Lott – backing vocals (5, 6)
- Joe Montana – backing vocals (5, 6)
- Jim Moran – backing vocals (5, 6)

=== Production ===
- Huey Lewis and the News – producers
- Jim Gaines – engineer
- Robert Missbach – engineer, mixing (1–8, 10)
- Michael Christopher – second engineer
- Phil Kaffel – additional engineer
- Malcolm Pollack – additional engineer, mixing (9)
- Rob Beaton – assistant engineer
- Alex Hass – assistant engineer
- Tom Size – assistant engineer
- Jim "Watts" Vereecke – assistant engineer
- Bob Clearmountain – mixing on "The Power of Love"
- Mixed at The Power Station (New York, NY).
- Bob Ludwig – mastering at Masterdisk (New York, NY).
- Ralph Arista – guitar technician
- Jerry Daniels – keyboard technician
- Terry Persons – production manager
- Anita Wong – production design
- Laura Lamar – graphic design
- Bennett Hall – art direction, illustration, photography

== Charts ==
=== Weekly charts ===
Chart (1986)	Peak position
Australian Albums (Kent Music Report)	3
Austrian Albums (Ö3 Austria)	22
Belgian Albums (BEA)	16
Canadian Albums (RPM)	1
Dutch Albums (Album Top 100)	33
European Top 100 Albums	11
Finnish Albums (Suomen virallinen lista)	7
German Albums (Offizielle Top 100)	5
Icelandic Albums (Tónlist)	7
Japanese Albums (Oricon)	1
New Zealand Albums (RMNZ)	1
Norwegian Albums (VG-lista)	6
Portuguese Albums (Musica & Som)	12
Swedish Albums (Sverigetopplistan)	7
Swiss Albums (Schweizer Hitparade)	4
UK Albums (OCC)	8
US Billboard 200	1
Zimbabwean Albums (ZIMA)	6

=== Year-end charts ===
Chart (1986)	Position
Canadian Albums Chart (RPM)	11
New Zealand Albums Chart	46
Norwegian Albums Chart (Høst Period)	10
Swiss Albums Chart	25
UK Albums Chart	29

Chart (1987)	Position
Canadian Albums Chart (RPM)	36
New Zealand Albums Chart	48
UK Albums Chart	92
US Billboard 200	7

== Certifications ==
Region	Certification	Certified units/sales
Canada (Music Canada)	5× Platinum	500,000^{^}
Germany (BVMI)	Gold	250,000^{^}
New Zealand (RMNZ)	Platinum	15,000^{^}
United Kingdom (BPI)	2× Platinum	600,000^{^}
United States (RIAA)	3× Platinum	3,000,000^{^}
^{^} Shipments figures based on certification alone.
