= The Heart of Rock and Roll (musical) =

2018 musical directed by Gordon Greenberg

- A New Musical Comedy
- Broadway Promotional Poster
- Music: Huey Lewis and the News; Arranged by: Brian Usifer
- Lyrics: Huey Lewis and others
- Book: Jonathan Abrams; Story by Tyler Mitchell and Jonathan Abrams
- Productions: 2018 San Diego; 2024 Broadway

The Heart of Rock and Roll is a jukebox musical with a book by Jonathan Abrams and music and lyrics by Huey Lewis and his pop rock band Huey Lewis and the News, with new orchestrations of their music by Brian Usifer.

The show features an original story revolving around a couple balancing their romance amidst their rock and roll world and corporate world dreams. It is not a biographical piece about the band. The musical officially opened on Broadway at the James Earl Jones Theatre on April 22, 2024 and closed on June 23, 2024.

== Origin ==
Going back to at least 2010, producer and writer Tyler Mitchell, whose father-in-law is a good friend of Huey Lewis, first proposed the idea of a musical featuring the band's songs to Lewis. Lewis said he had thought of the idea before, but did not know how the band's songs could be linked together into a story, "because they have nothing to do with each other." Mitchell then connected with Jonathan Abrams to write a draft original story, and they continued to hone the story over time.

== Production history ==
=== San Diego (2018) ===
Huey Lewis first publicly announced the future show in a video with Jimmy Kimmel in February 2018, with Kimmel claiming he was quitting his show to star as Huey in the show, and then being crushed to learn Lewis was not a character in the show. At that time, a venue and debut date was not yet set. It debuted at the Old Globe Theatre in San Diego in September 2018, where it opened previews on September 6, opened on September 14, and ran through October 21, 2018. Matt Doyle and Katie Rose Clarke starred in that production. Doyle actually grew up down the street from Lewis in Ross, California, and already knew the band's music well when he auditioned. The debut was only a few months after Lewis announced he had Ménière's disease and could no longer perform, and he was glad to be able to focus on the show to stay involved with music.

=== Broadway (2024) ===
In July 2023, a pre-Broadway workshop was held in New York City. In November 2023, it was announced that the show would open on Broadway in the Spring of 2024. The show began previews on March 29, 2024, and officially opened on April 22 at the James Earl Jones Theatre. The Broadway cast was announced in January 2024. John Dossett, F. Micheal Haynie, Orville Mendoza, and Billy Harrigan Tighe were cast for the same roles they played in the San Diego production.

The show is directed by Gordon Greenberg and choreographed by Lorin Latarro, with a book by Jonathan Abrams, derived from the story written by Abrams and Mitchell. Mitchell is producing with Hunter Arnold and Kayla Greenspan. The music supervisor/arranger is Brian Usifer and the music director is Will Van Dyke.

The show closed on June 23, 2024.

== Reception ==
The reviews of the Broadway production have been positive - finding the show entertaining and funny, even if the plot, like many a jukebox musical, is not deep. Elisabeth Vincentelli of The New York Times described it as "the Huey Lewis of musicals: not taking itself too seriously, doing what it does well, and just happy to be on Broadway, keeping company with starrier productions." The New York Post found it to be the "underdog highlight of the season." Vulture called it the "funniest new musical of the season."

== Cast and characters ==
| Character | San Diego | Broadway |
| Character | 2018 | 2024 |
|---|---|---|
| Bobby Stivic | Matt Doyle | Corey Cott |
| Cassandra Stone | Katie Rose Clarke | McKenzie Kurtz |
| Wyatt | Christopher Ramirez | Josh Breckenridge |
| Glenn | F. Michael Haynie | F. Michael Haynie |
| Paige | Paige Faure | Zoe Jensen |
| Roz | Patrice Covington | Tamika Lawrence |
| JJ | Lucas Papaelias | Raymond J. Lee |
| Eli | Zachary Noah Piser | John Michael-Lyles |
| Otto Fjord | Orville Mendoza | Orville Mendoza |
| Tucker | Billy Harrigan Tighe | Billy Harrigan Tighe |
| Chuck Stone | John Dossett | John Dossett |

== Musical numbers ==
Act I

- "Bobby's Daydream" - Bobby, Glenn, JJ, Eli, Company
- "Hip to Be Square" - Bobby, Cassandra, Roz, Stone
- "Be Someone" - Bobby, Roz
- "Don't Make Me Do It" - Cassandra, Paige
- "Do You Believe in Love?" - Bobby, Fjord
- "Workin' for a Livin'" - Cassandra, Roz, Stone, Bobby
- "I Know What I Like" - Cassandra, Bobby
- "It's All Right" - Bobby, Cassandra
- "I Never Walk Alone" / "Finally Found A Home" - Bobby, Glenn, JJ, Eli
- "That's Not Me" - Tucker, Wyatt
- "Give Me The Keys (And I'll Drive You Crazy)" - Cassandra, Tucker, Wyatt
- "The Pitch" - Bobby, Cassandra, Stone
- "Do You Believe in Love? (reprise)" - Bobby, Cassandra, Glenn, JJ, Eli
- "The Heart of Rock & Roll" - Company

Act II

- "You Crack Me Up" - Cassandra, Paige, Tucker, Wyatt
- "It's All Right (reprise)" - Bobby, Roz, Cassandra, Paige
- "I Want a New Drug" - Bobby
- "Doing It All for My Baby" - Roz, Stone, Fjord, Bobby
- "Stuck with You" - Cassandra, Paige, Tucker, Wyatt
- "Don't Make Me Do It (reprise)" - Paige, Wyatt
- "The Power of Love" - Bobby
- "It Hit Me Like a Hammer" - Cassandra
- "Back In Time" - Roz, Bobby
- "Jacob's Ladder" - Bobby, Glenn, JJ, Eli
- "The Only One" - Bobby
- "Perfect World" - Glenn, JJ, Eli
- "Be Someone (reprise)" - Bobby
- "The Awards Ceremony" - Company
- "If This Is It" - Bobby, Paige, Wyatt, Fjord
- "Tattoo (Giving It All Up for Love)" - Bobby, Paige, Wyatt, Fjord
- "Power of Love (reprise)" - Company

== Awards and nominations ==
=== 2024 Broadway Production ===
| Year | Award | Category | Nominee | Result |
|---|---|---|---|---|
| 2024 | Drama League Awards | Outstanding Production of a Musical | | Nominated |
| 2024 | Chita Rivera Awards | Outstanding Choreography in a Broadway Show | Lorin Latarro | Nominated |
| 2024 | Chita Rivera Awards | Outstanding Ensemble in a Broadway Show | | Nominated |
