= I Know What I Like =

Single by Huey Lewis and the News

from the album Fore!
- B-side: "Forest for the Trees"
- Released: March 23, 1987
- Genre: Rock
- Length: 3:59
- Label: Chrysalis
- Songwriters: Chris Hayes, Huey Lewis
- Producers: Huey Lewis and the News

Huey Lewis and the News singles chronology
"Jacob's Ladder" (1986)	"I Know What I Like" (1987)	"Simple As That" (1987)

"I Know What I Like" is a song performed by Huey Lewis and the News and released as the fourth single from the album Fore! in 1987. The single peaked at number nine on the U.S. Billboard Hot 100. Like their earlier single, "Hip to Be Square", "I Know What I Like" featured background performances by then-San Francisco 49ers, Dwight Clark, Riki Ellison, Ronnie Lott, and Joe Montana.

Upon the release of the album in 1986, "I Know What I Like" peaked at number 25 on the Billboard Album Rock Tracks chart in September 1986. When released as a single in 1987, the track re-entered the chart but topped out this time at number 31.

Cash Box called it a "good, straight-ahead rock-inflected tune."

The song is in major and uses the rare minor dominant (v) chord, lacking a leading-tone.

== Chart performance ==
Chart (1986)	Peak position
U.S. Billboard Album Rock Tracks	25

Chart (1987)	Peak position
Canada Top Singles (RPM)	30
Canada Retail Singles (The Record)	43
Israel (IBA)	22
U.S. Billboard Hot 100	9
U.S. Billboard Adult Contemporary	30
