= Paul Allen (American Psycho) =

American Psycho character

- American Psycho character
- Paul Allen as portrayed by Jared Leto in American Psycho (2000)
- First appearance: American Psycho (2000 film)
- Last appearance: American Psycho (2024 graphic novel)
- Created by: Bret Easton Ellis
- Portrayed by: Jared Leto

In-universe information
- Occupation: Investment banker, Vice-president
- Nationality: American

Paul Allen is a fictional character from the 2000 film American Psycho, based on the character Paul Owen in the 1991 novel American Psycho.

The character is named "Paul Owen" in the novel and in the musical. This version of the character makes a cameo in a later novel by Ellis, "Lunar Park". In the movie, Allen mistakes Bateman for Owen implying that Paul Owen is a separate character in the film.

Paul is critical to the plot of American Psycho, as it is his business card that drives Patrick Bateman to go on a killing spree out of jealously, starting with Paul.

== Fictional biography ==
Throughout the movie, Paul Allen consistently mistakes Bateman for another colleague friend, Marcus. He is a seemingly slightly more successful than Bateman, claiming that he can get reservations at the best restaurants, has a slightly better business card compared to Bateman and has a slightly better apartment. This leads Bateman to ultimately take Paul to dinner, where he inadvertently insults Bateman to his face and makes sexual remarks about his girlfriend. Bateman than drugs Paul, takes him to his apartment and kills him with an axe while playing the song "Hip to be Square" through his CD player. After this, an investigation is opened up into Paul's disappearance, where Bateman claims that Paul decided to go to London sporadically. The story ends unclear as to what happened to the investigation, where as Bateman is confessing his crimes to somebody, they contradict him by saying that they had dinner with Paul Allen twice in London. It is left ambiguous to if Bateman really killed Allen, or if he had just fantasized about it and never truly acted upon it, despite believing he had.
