= Riki Ellison =

American football player (born 1960)

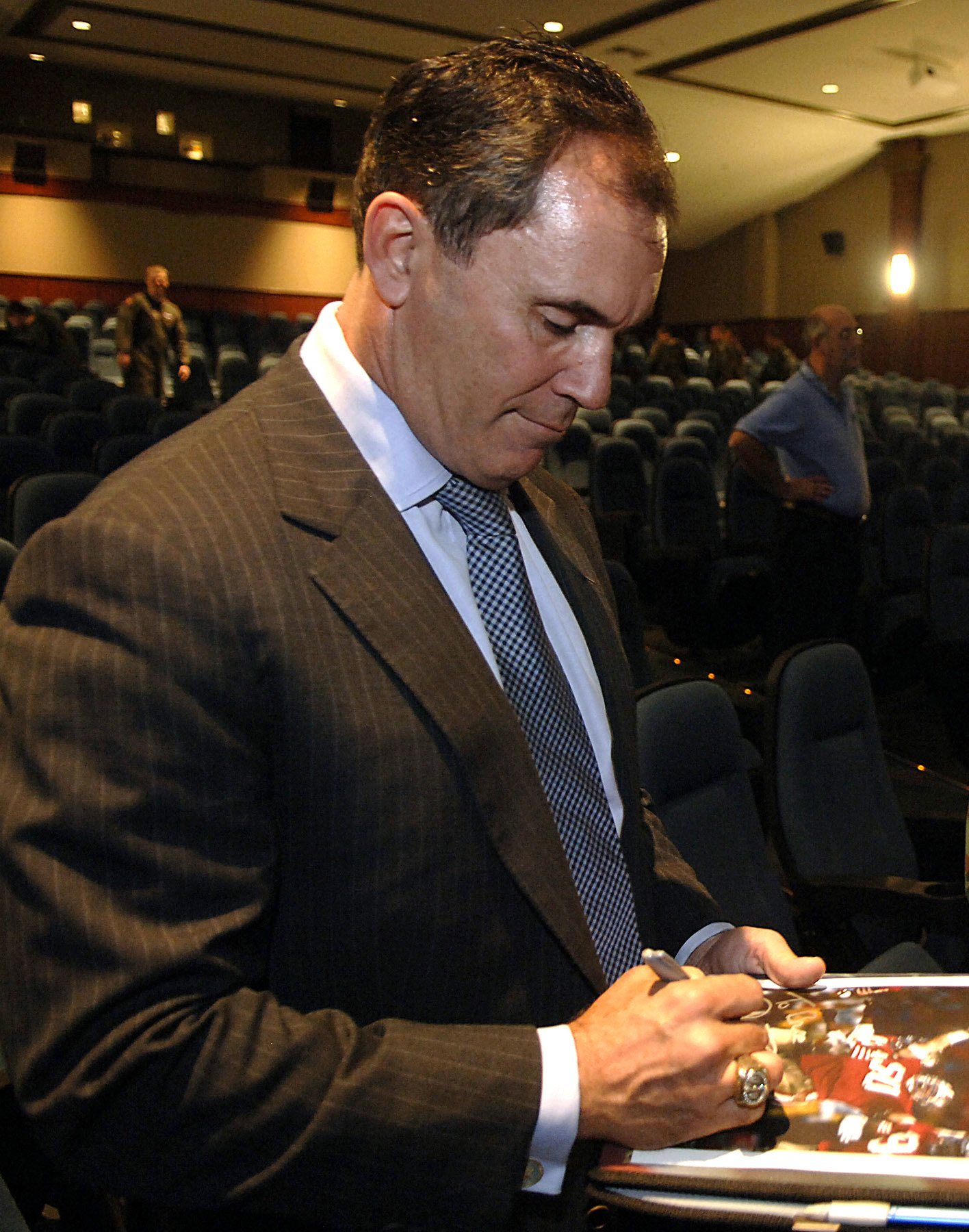
- Ellison in 2007

No. 35, 50
- Position: Linebacker

Personal information
- Born: 15 August 1960 (age 66); Christchurch, New Zealand
- Listed height: 6 ft 2 in (1.88 m)
- Listed weight: 220 lb (100 kg)

Career information
- High school: Amphitheater (Tucson, Arizona, U.S.)
- College: USC
- NFL draft: 1983: 5th round, 117th overall pick

Career history
- San Francisco 49ers (1983–1989); Los Angeles Raiders (1990–1992)

Awards and highlights
- 3× Super Bowl champion (XIX, XXIII, XXIV); National champion (1978); First-team All-Pac-10 (1979); 2× Second-team All-Pac-10 (1980, 1982); 2× Rose Bowl champion (1979, 1980)

Career NFL statistics
- Sacks: 5
- Interceptions: 1
- Fumble recoveries: 7
- Stats at Pro Football Reference

Riki Morgan Ellison (born 15 August 1960) is a New Zealand-American former professional player of American football who was a linebacker for ten seasons in the National Football League (NFL). He was known as Riki Gray while playing college football for the USC Trojans, earning all-conference honors in the Pac-10 in 1982. He is the first New Zealander to play in the NFL and the first New Zealander to win a Super Bowl. Ellison is also the founder of the Missile Defense Advocacy Alliance and the Youth Impact Program.

== Early life ==
Ellison played for the Amphitheater Panthers in Tucson, Arizona, where he won a State Championship in 1975. Ellison was the first All American at Amphitheater High School, and in 1977, he won Arizona Player of the Year. Ellison's jersey number, 35, has since been retired. Ellison is also a member of the Pima County Hall of Fame.

== College career ==
Ellison was part of a USC Trojans team that won two Rose Bowls in 1979 and 1980 and won a National Championship. Ellison was a four-year starter, beginning his Freshman year on the 1978 National Championship team. He graduated from USC with a degree in international relations with a graduate emphasis on defense and strategic studies.

== Professional career ==
The NFL San Francisco 49ers chose him with their fifth-round pick in the 1983 NFL draft becoming the first-ever New Zealander and Māori to play in Professional Football. Jerry Attaway, his conditioning coach at USC and (teammate) Ronnie Lott had convinced Bill Walsh to select him in the draft. That year, Ellison was named to the All-Rookie Team and the next season named on the All Madden Team and he was an alternate All-Pro at the end of his career with the Raiders. Riki Ellison played in the same defensive backfield alongside Ronnie Lott for 12 seasons at USC, 49ers and Raiders.

Ellison won three Super Bowls during his seven years with the 49ers. He was drafted alongside a pair of future Pro Bowlers, running back Roger Craig and centre/guard Jesse Sapolu. In his final season with the 49ers in 1989, he broke his right arm in the final preseason game and was placed on the injured reserve list for the season. He played his final three seasons with the Los Angeles Raiders.

Ellison's career included winning 3 Super Bowls, playing in 5 championship games.

In 2017, Ellison was inducted into the Polynesian Football Hall of Fame.

=== Head coach at T.C. Williams High School ===
In April 2001, Ellison accepted the position of head football coach for T.C. Williams High School in Alexandria, Virginia (the same school featured in the 2000 movie Remember The Titans). Ellison declined to seek renewal of his contract, and resigned in March 2003.

== Personal ==
Ellison is of Māori descent (Ngāi Tahu), born in Christchurch, New Zealand. At eight, Ellison moved to Kuala Lumpur, Malaysia with his father, Dan, who went on to become an economic advisor to the United Nations. Shortly thereafter, Ellison's parents divorced and he relocated with his mother to Los Angeles, where she remarried Dennis Gray and moved to Beaver Creek Ranch, Rimrock, Arizona. Ellison went to high school in Tucson, Arizona.

The Ellison family comes from a strong sporting background. He is related to professional rugby players Tamati Ellison and Jacob Ellison who both played in Super Rugby. His grandfather Edward Ellison played on the 1911 NZ Maori team and was awarded the King George V Silver Jubilee Medal in 1935 and was appointed an Officer of the Order of the British Empire in 1938 for his work as a Doctor in the Pacific. Thomas Ellison, his great-uncle, played for the first New Zealand rugby team to play in Great Britain in 1888 and 1889, and captained the first New Zealand team to play in Australia in 1893.

Riki Ellison is married to Heather Ellison. They have four children and six grandchildren. Wesley Ellison Steward, Brooke Ellison Carney, Rhett Ellison and Troy Ellison. Rhett Ellison was the Captain of the USC football team and was drafted into the NFL playing for 8 years as a tight end for the Minnesota Vikings and New York Giants.

Ellison and 49ers teammates Lott, Joe Montana, and Dwight Clark were backup singers with Huey Lewis and the News on their 1980s singles "Hip to be Square" and "I Know What I Like".

In 2009, NZ On Air made a documentary about Ellison titled The Defender.
