= Dwight Clark =

American football player and executive (1957–2018)

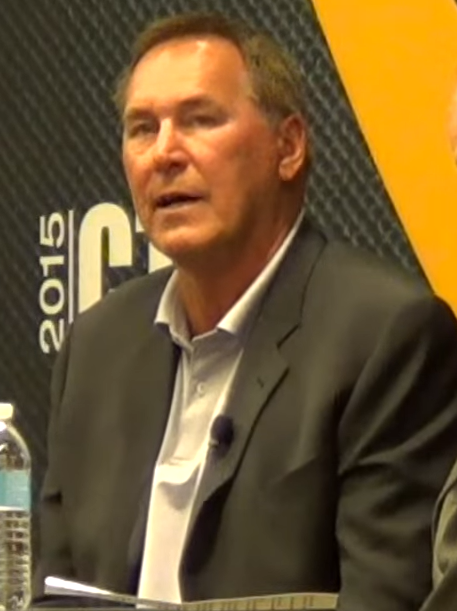
- Clark in 2015

No. 87
- Position: Wide receiver

Personal information
- Born: January 8, 1957; Kinston, North Carolina, U.S.
- Died: June 4, 2018 (aged 61); Whitefish, Montana, U.S.
- Listed height: 6 ft 4 in (1.93 m)
- Listed weight: 212 lb (96 kg)

Career information
- High school: Garinger (Charlotte, North Carolina)
- College: Clemson (1975–1978)
- NFL draft: 1979: 10th round, 249th overall pick

Career history

Playing
- San Francisco 49ers (1979–1987)

Operations
- San Francisco 49ers (1990–1991) Executive administrative assistant; San Francisco 49ers (1992–1994) Vice president of player personnel; San Francisco 49ers (1995–1997) Vice president & director of football operations; San Francisco 49ers (1998) General manager & director of football operations; Cleveland Browns (1999–2001) General manager

Awards and highlights
- 2× Super Bowl champion (XVI, XIX); First team All-Pro (1982); 2× Pro Bowl (1981, 1982); NFL receptions leader (1982); San Francisco 49ers Hall of Fame; San Francisco 49ers No. 87 retired; Clemson University Athletics Hall of Fame; Bay Area Sports Hall of Fame

Career NFL statistics
- Receptions: 506
- Receiving yards: 6,750
- Receiving touchdowns: 48
- Stats at Pro Football Reference
- Executive profile at Pro Football Reference

Dwight Edward Clark (January 8, 1957 – June 4, 2018) was an American professional football wide receiver who played for the San Francisco 49ers of the National Football League (NFL) from 1979 to 1987. He was a member of San Francisco's first two Super Bowl championship teams.

He caught the winning touchdown pass thrown by quarterback Joe Montana in the NFC Championship Game on January 10, 1982, against the Dallas Cowboys. The play, immortalized as "the Catch", propelled the 49ers to their first Super Bowl championship. Clark played college football for the Clemson Tigers and was selected by the 49ers in the tenth round of the 1979 NFL draft. He served as the general manager of the 49ers from 1995 to 1998 and in the same capacity with the Cleveland Browns from 1999 to 2001.

== Early life ==
Clark was born on January 8, 1957, in Kinston, North Carolina. He graduated from Garinger High School in Charlotte, North Carolina, where he played quarterback.

== College career ==
At 6 ft 4 in (1.93 m), Clark's first love was basketball, but he accepted a scholarship to play college football at Clemson University.

As a freshman, Clark was moved to wide receiver, because the team had recruited four other quarterbacks. As a sophomore, he was named the starter at strong safety, but he disliked the position and left school to go back to his hometown in Charlotte instead. Clark was unhappy and considered transferring to play basketball at Appalachian State University, until he was finally allowed to play offense. After returning to the team, he was a backup wide receiver and finished with five receptions for 99 yards and a 19.8-yard average.

As a junior, Clark was named a starter at wide receiver and was part of the team that qualified Clemson to the Gator Bowl, its first bowl game in 18 years. He was third on the team with 17 receptions for 265 yards and one touchdown.

In Clark's senior season in 1978, the Tigers were 11–1, won the Gator Bowl over Ohio State, and finished sixth in the final AP poll. He was second on the team with 11 receptions for 207 yards and 2 touchdowns, including a career-high 68-yard touchdown catch against the University of Maryland that helped the Tigers win the ACC Championship.

At Clemson, Clark wore #30, posting only 33 catches for 571 yards, three touchdowns and a 17.3-yard average (seventh in school history). Unheralded as a collegian playing alongside wide receiver Jerry Butler, Clark felt fortunate to get to the NFL.

In 1988, Clark was inducted into the Clemson Hall of Fame. In 2018, he was inducted into the South Carolina Football Hall of Fame.

== Professional career ==
The San Francisco 49ers selected Clark with the first pick of the tenth round (249th overall) of the 1979 NFL draft, even though some people in the organization questioned the selection at the time, considering he was seen as an undrafted free agent. New head coach Bill Walsh had visited Clemson to scout quarterback Steve Fuller, Clark's roommate. When the 49er contingent arrived on campus, Clark answered the phone by chance on his way out to play golf and was convinced to participate as Fuller's pass catcher at the workout, where Walsh was impressed with his receiving skills.

The 49ers were 2–14 in 1978 and had the same record in 1979. But they soon greatly improved, winning the Super Bowl at the ends of the 1981 and 1984 seasons, and, starting in 1981, making the playoffs every year Clark was with them except 1982.

Clark tallied 506 catches for 6,750 yards and 48 touchdowns, along with 50 rushing yards in his nine NFL seasons with the 49ers. He led the NFL in receptions (60) during the strike-shortened 1982 season and made the Pro Bowl twice, in 1981 and 1982. Sports Illustrated writer Paul Zimmerman named Clark his Player of the Year for 1982.

=== The Catch ===
In the 1981 NFC Championship game, on January 10, 1982, against the Dallas Cowboys, the 49ers trailed 27–21 with 58 seconds to play. On 3rd-and-3, Clark leaped and caught a 6-yard pass from quarterback Joe Montana in the back of the end zone to tie the score, and Ray Wersching's extra-point kick advanced the 49ers to Super Bowl XVI. That play, one of the most famous in the history of the NFL, has been immortalized as "The Catch". Clark finished the game with eight receptions for 120 yards and two touchdowns. During the 1981 season, Walsh had Montana practice that part of the play back in training camp. Montana said, "We'd never thrown the ball to Dwight on that play, at all." In the early 1990s, Clark's catch had become the most requested clip in the archives of NFL Films, which was charging up to $5,000 for its use.

=== Retirement and legacy ===
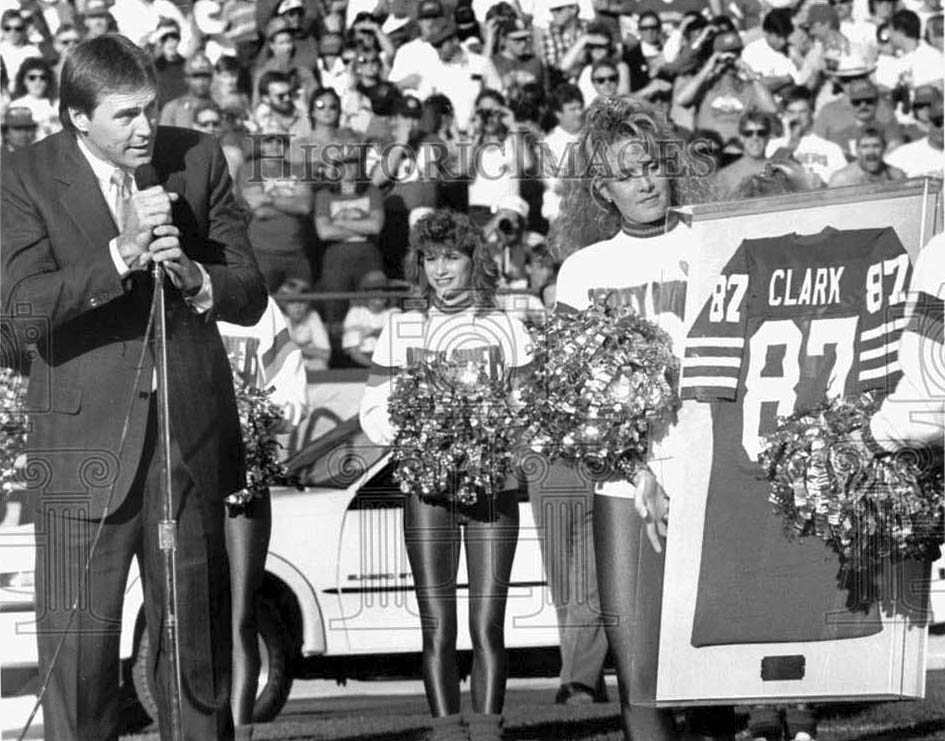
Clark during number 87 retirement ceremony, December 1988

After nine seasons with the 49ers, Clark retired following the 1987 season. He was a member of two Super Bowl-winning teams (XVI and XIX). To honor his contribution to 49ers, the club retired his #87 in 1988. He served as a team executive for the 49ers until 1998, when he resigned to become the first general manager in the expansion era of the Cleveland Browns, after following Carmen Policy who would run the team under the ownership of Al Lerner. In their first draft in 1999, the Browns went for quarterback Tim Couch, deciding to reject the calls from the Saints that offered their entire array of draft picks in order to try and draft Ricky Williams. He was executive vice president and director of football operations from 1999 to 2001.

On May 14, 2002, he resigned from his position with the Browns after new head coach Butch Davis requested the right to make personnel decisions. In the 2018 NFL Films documentary Dwight Clark: A Football Life, he was quoted as saying that it was probably a mistake to have accepted the position. He would later return to North Carolina to run his real estate business.

Clark built his restaurant, Clark's By The Bay, the year he retired and decorated it with sports memorabilia including The Catch. Initially serving Cajun food, it later switched to prime rib and seafood. Located in Redwood City, California, the restaurant was sold in 1993.

=== Media appearances ===
Clark joined his 49er teammates Joe Montana, Ronnie Lott, and Riki Ellison in performing backup vocals on Huey Lewis and the News hit songs "Hip to Be Square" and "I Know What I Like" for the band's Fore! album. Huey Lewis later indicated he was impressed by Clark's singing abilities. Clark later took the lead role in the 1993 direct-to-video comedy Kindergarten Ninja. He also appeared in the video game All-Pro Football 2K8. He joined Comcast SportsNet Bay Area in 2011 as an analyst for 49ers Postgame Live. Post-retirement, Clark expressed remorse about the end of Candlestick Park, saying that "It was a dump [but] it was our dump, so we could talk bad about it, but we didn't want anybody else to talk bad about it."

== NFL career statistics ==
Legend
	Led the league
	Won the Super Bowl
**Bold**	Career high

Year	Team	Games		Receiving						Fum
Year	Team	GP	GS	Rec	Yds	Avg	Lng	TD	Y/G	Fum
1979	SF	16	3	18	232	12.9	30	0	14.5	0
1980	SF	16	12	82	991	12.1	71	8	61.9	**2**
1981	SF	16	16	**85**	**1,105**	13.0	78	4	69.1	0
1982	SF	9	8	60	913	15.2	51	5	**101.4**	1
1983	SF	16	13	70	840	12.0	46	8	52.5	0
1984	SF	16	14	52	880	**16.9**	**80**	6	55.0	0
1985	SF	16	14	54	705	13.1	49	**10**	44.1	0
1986	SF	16	14	61	794	13.0	45	2	49.6	0
1987	SF	13	3	24	290	12.1	40	5	22.3	1
Career		134	97	506	6,750	13.3	80	48	50.4	4

== Personal life ==
Clark dated Miss Universe Shawn Weatherly from 1978 to 1982.

Clark met Ashley Stone in 1982; they married the following year. He had three children with Stone: a daughter, Casey, and two sons, Riley and Mac. They divorced in 2009. Clark married Kelly Radzikowski in 2011. They moved to Santa Cruz.

== Illness and death ==
On March 19, 2017, Clark announced that he had been diagnosed with amyotrophic lateral sclerosis (ALS), also known as Lou Gehrig's disease. He stated that he believed he developed ALS as a result of playing football; he suffered three concussions during his playing career. "I've been asked if playing football caused this," Clark wrote. "I don't know for sure, but I certainly suspect it did, and I encourage the National Football League Players Association (NFLPA) and the NFL to continue working together in their efforts to make the game of football safer, especially as it relates to head trauma."

Clark died of the disease on June 4, 2018. At the time of his death, Clark lived in Whitefish, Montana, with his wife Kelly. He was the father-in-law of former NHL defenseman Peter Harrold. Clark had a close friendship with former 49ers owner Edward J. DeBartolo Jr. DeBartolo sent Clark to Japan in 2017 to bring back a three-month supply of the drug Radicava before it became available in the United States.
