= List of San Francisco 49ers retired numbers =

The San Francisco 49ers have retired 12 jersey numbers.

== Retired numbers ==
San Francisco 49ers retired numbers
No.	Image	Player	Pos.	Tenure	No. ret.	Refs.
8		Steve Young	QB	1987–1999	October 5, 2008	
12		John Brodie^{*}	QB	1957–1973	December 15, 1973	
16		Joe Montana	QB	1979–1992	December 15, 1997	
34		Joe Perry	FB	1948–1960, 1963	1971	
37		Jimmy Johnson	CB / WR	1961–1976	1977	
39		Hugh McElhenny	RB	1952–1960	1971	
42		Ronnie Lott	S / CB	1981–1990	November 17, 2003	
70		Charlie Krueger	DL	1959–1973	October 6, 1974	
73		Leo Nomellini	DT / OT	1950–1963	1971	
79		Bob St. Clair	OT	1953–1963	December 2, 2001	
80		Jerry Rice	WR	1985–2000	September 20, 2010	
87		Dwight Clark	WR	1979–1987	December 11, 1988	

Notes

^{*} During his tenure with the 49ers from 2006 to 2007, quarterback Trent Dilfer, a long-time friend of Brodie, wore No. 12 with his permission, unofficially unretiring the number as a tribute.

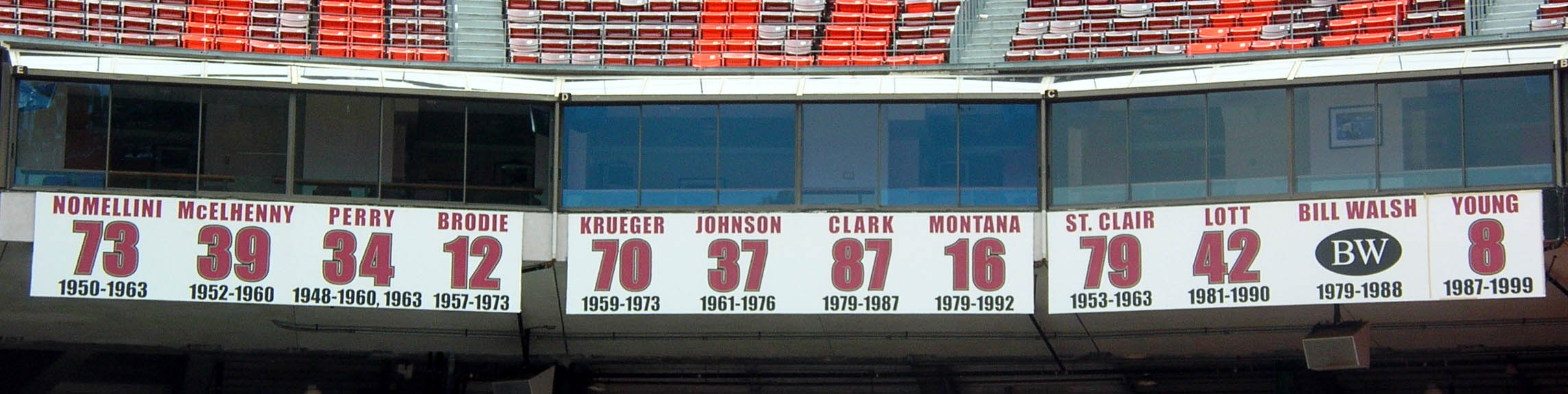
The 49ers' retired numbers displayed on the southeastern side of Candlestick Park in June 2009
