= American Psycho (musical) =

2013 Musical

- The Musical
- Original London Production Poster
- Music: Duncan Sheik
- Lyrics: Duncan Sheik
- Book: Roberto Aguirre-Sacasa
- Basis: American Psycho by Bret Easton Ellis
- Premiere: 12 December 2013: Almeida Theatre
- Productions: 2013 London; 2016 Broadway; 2019 Sydney; 2023 Chicago; 2025 Houston; 2026 London revival

American Psycho is a musical with music and lyrics by Duncan Sheik and a book by Roberto Aguirre-Sacasa. It is based on the controversial 1991 novel American Psycho by Bret Easton Ellis, which also inspired a 2000 film of the same name, that starred Christian Bale. Set in Manhattan during the Wall Street boom of the late 1980s, American Psycho is about the daily life of Patrick Bateman, a young and wealthy investment banker who is also secretly a serial killer.

The musical received its world premiere at London's Almeida Theatre in 2013, directed by Rupert Goold and starring Doctor Who actor Matt Smith. A Broadway production began preview performances on March 24, 2016, at the Gerald Schoenfeld Theatre, directed by Goold and starring Benjamin Walker as Patrick Bateman.

== Background ==
The musical is based on the 1991 novel American Psycho by Bret Easton Ellis. In 2008, producers David Johnson, Jesse Singer, Nate Bolotin and Aaron Ray purchased the stage rights and were developing a musical adaptation of the novel to appear on Broadway. In 2010, the project had rounded out the key elements. Duncan Sheik, who won a Grammy and two Tony Awards for writing the songs in the Broadway hit Spring Awakening, and playwright Roberto Aguirre-Sacasa had completed the first act. A workshop took place in Manhattan in 2011, with Benjamin Walker playing the lead role of Patrick Bateman. In April 2012, London theatre company Headlong was set to stage the musical's world premiere at the Almeida Theatre during their 2012–13 season. At the same time a Kickstarter campaign was launched to raise $150,000, to allow them to have a live orchestra and extend the rehearsal period for the production to seven weeks.

== Plot ==
This synopsis reflects the 2016 Broadway production.

Act I

Patrick Bateman is a 26-year-old investment banker living in New York City at the end of the 1980s. Bateman documents his morning routine, which involves fastidious grooming, tanning, and carefully selecting a designer suit, before travelling to Wall Street ("Opening (Morning Routine)"/"Selling Out"). He arrives at Pierce & Pierce, the elite bank for which he works, and is greeted by his doting secretary, Jean ("Everybody Wants to Rule the World"). He anxiously enquires about the Fisher account, an exclusive account that is highly sought after by Patrick and his colleagues. Later, Patrick has lunch with his coworkers, Tim Price, Craig McDermott, Luis Carruthers and David Van Patten. They exchange fashion tips and critique restaurants before another colleague, Paul Owen, enters. Patrick learns that Owen has secured the Fisher account as well as reservations at Dorsia, New York's most exclusive new restaurant. Absurdly jealous, Patrick attempts to save face by showing everyone his new business card, which leads Paul to show his ("Cards"). Paul mistakes Patrick as Marcus Halberstam, another coworker of Bateman's. Patrick then invites him to his birthday dinner, thrown by Evelyn Williams, his girlfriend, and Courtney Lawrence, her best friend and Luis Carruthers' girlfriend. Patrick calls Evelyn, telling her about Paul coming to the party. Evelyn hates the idea of having an odd number at her table, so Patrick also invites Jean to appease her. Evelyn and Courtney discuss their designer clothes and expensive food before the party ("You Are What You Wear").

Patrick and Tim arrive at Evelyn's townhouse late, which irritates Evelyn. Over dinner, the party blandly pontificate about social and political issues, such as homelessness, gentrification and the Sri Lankan Civil War. Patrick makes a scene by butchering his birthday cake with a huge knife he is carrying ("Happy Birthday"). After dinner, Patrick and Tim go to a club, where they dance and snort cocaine ("True Faith"/"Killing Time"). Suddenly overcome with despair and an awareness of the hollowness of his existence, Patrick rushes out of the club ("In the Air Tonight"). Patrick meets a homeless man on the street, offering him money and taunting him, before stabbing him to death.

At the gym, McDermott, Van Patten, and Luis work out and comment on the physiques of their female instructors ("Hardbody"). Meanwhile, it is revealed that Patrick is having an affair with Courtney. After having sex, Courtney ends the affair, telling a dismissive Patrick that they are betraying their respective partners. He meets his friends at the gym and attempts to strangle Luis in the steamroom. Luis interprets Patrick's actions as a sexual advance and begs him to continue; disgusted, Patrick flees. During the intermission of a showing of Les Misérables, Evelyn broaches the subject of marriage with Patrick, who is not convinced by the prospect, while Jean, also attending the show, observes from across the theater ("If We Get Married").

Patrick heads to the Meatpacking District and picks up a prostitute named Christine, to whom he introduces himself as Paul Owen. He hires another prostitute named Sabrina and pays the two to engage in violent, sadistic sex with one another and with him ("Not a Common Man"). On Christmas Eve, Patrick waxes lyrical about Les Misérables to Jean and the two discuss their plans for the holidays. Patrick escorts his mother to Evelyn's Christmas party, where he binges on drugs and alcohol ("Mistletoe Alert"). He runs into Paul Owen at the party and invites him back to his apartment. The two dance to "Hip to Be Square". Patrick spikes Owen's drink, puts on a raincoat and begins a long one-sided analysis of the artistic and commercial merits of the band Huey Lewis and the News before slaughtering Owen with an axe.

Act II

Patrick takes Owen's body to an apartment he owns anonymously and dissolves it in a bathtub with a bag of lye. Afterwards, he lets himself into Paul's apartment and stages his disappearance by resetting his voicemail and packing many of his possessions into a suitcase ("Clean"). Months pass, during which Patrick murders several people ("Killing Spree"). One afternoon, Patrick's mother arrives on Wall Street expecting to have lunch with her son; Patrick, who has totally forgotten about the appointment, panics and begs Jean to get rid of her. Jean convinces Patrick to attend the lunch and offers to join the pair. Much to Jean's delight, Mrs. Bateman tells her stories about Patrick as a child, and says they would make a good couple ("Nice Thought"). Back at Pierce & Pierce, Detective Donald Kimball calls on Patrick to question him about Owen's disappearance. Uneasy, Patrick tries his hardest to evade questioning and asks Kimball to keep him updated about the manhunt. Keen to disentangle himself from New York, Patrick calls Evelyn and suggests a holiday, and Evelyn proposes a trip to the Hamptons. The idyllic setting cannot heal Patrick's psyche, however; while Evelyn flourishes amid garden parties and Pilates classes, Patrick's grasp on reality loosens further ("At the End of an Island"/"Hardbody Hamptons"). He promises Evelyn that if they return to New York he will marry her. On his return, he appropriates Paul Owen's apartment as a place to host and kill more victims, beginning with Sabrina and Christine ("I Am Back").

Luis runs into Patrick at a Barneys store and begs Patrick to run away with him. Patrick responds aggressively, assaulting Luis. With his appetite for murder now totally unchecked, Patrick targets Jean, offering to take her to dinner at a restaurant of her choice. His sense of inferiority is piqued once again when she suggests Dorsia, where he is still unable to get reservations. Patrick gives Jean the rest of the day off and she wonders about her feelings for Patrick ("A Girl Before"). At Patrick's apartment that night, the pair discuss her hopes and aspirations. As he is preparing to murder her, Jean tells Patrick that she is in love with him; her confession causes him great distress and he implores her to leave. He leaves a long voicemail for Kimball confessing to the murder of Paul Owen and countless other people ("Clean (Reprise)").

The next morning, Jean apologizes to Patrick for what happened the night before. He forgives her and tells her that he will be recommending her for a promotion. Tim unexpectedly arrives at Patrick's office, announcing to Patrick that he's getting the Fisher account. Patrick is stunned, and Tim suggests celebrating with the rest of their crew.

Patrick, Evelyn, McDermott, Van Patten, Tim, Luis, Courtney, and Patrick's brother, Sean, head to Tunnel ("Don't You Want Me"). Patrick is noticeably ill at ease and is desperate to go to dinner. Sean says he is able to get reservations at Dorsia, which impresses the guests. Patrick sees Kimball at the bar and approaches him, asking him about the voicemail confession. Kimball breaks into laughter, stating that he found Patrick's 'joke' "hilarious", despite Bateman's protestations that the confessions were genuine. Kimball tells Patrick that his narrative of what happened to Owen is impossible, as Owen is in fact in London; Kimball allegedly had dinner with him there twice. The next day, Patrick goes to Paul Owen's apartment, expecting it to be full of decomposing bodies and cordoned off by the police. Instead, he finds the apartment vacant and in pristine condition; the real estate agent, Mrs Wolfe, deflects all of Patrick's questions about Paul Owen and the bodies that were left in the apartment, before asking him to leave and never return. He marries Evelyn and resigns himself to a pointless existence in which the punishment and notoriety that he craves will forever be denied him ("This Is Not an Exit").

== Production history ==
=== London (2013-14) ===
American Psycho began previews on December 3, 2013, at the Almeida Theatre, London, before holding its official opening night on December 12, with booking initially until January 25, but later extended by a week to February 1, 2014, when it closed. The show has a book by Roberto Aguirre-Sacasa with music and lyrics by Duncan Sheik, and was directed by Rupert Goold, with choreography by Lynne Page, set design by Es Devlin, lighting design by Jon Clark, costume design by Katrina Lindsay, video by Finn Ross, musical direction by David Shrubsole and sound by Paul Arditti. Tickets for the world premiere production sold out. Notable casting for the show included Matt Smith as Patrick Bateman, Susannah Fielding as Evelyn Williams, Jonathan Bailey as Tim Price, Ben Aldridge as Paul Owen, and Lucie Jones as Victoria. A typical London performance ran two hours and 40 minutes, including one interval of 20 minutes.

=== Broadway (2016) ===
Following its premiere production, a workshop of the musical was held in January 2015 in New York City. The same year, the musical was scheduled to open in Broadway in March 2016, following previews from February 19, at a yet unknown Shubert theater. Lead casting would include Benjamin Walker in the lead role of Patrick Bateman, reprising his role from the 2011 workshop. The musical had a preview performances at the Gerald Schoenfeld Theatre on March 24, 2016. Tony Award winner Alice Ripley joined the cast as Patrick Bateman's mother and Mrs. Wolfe, along with Tony Award nominee Jennifer Damiano as Jean, and Heléne Yorke as Evelyn Williams. Damiano previously worked with Sheik in the original production of Spring Awakening on Broadway, as well as with co-starring opposite Ripley as Mother and Daughter in the original production of Next to Normal.

The musical had a closing date of June 5, 2016 after 27 previews and 54 regular performances.

=== Sydney (2019) ===
The Australian premiere production opened at the Hayes Theatre in Sydney on May 10, 2019, and played until June 14, completely selling out their season. This production was directed by Alex Berlage and starred Ben Gerrard as Patrick Bateman. The production received nine Sydney Theatre Awards, and transferred to the Sydney Opera House's Playhouse for a season in June 2021 before a limited Australian tour.

=== Chicago (2023) ===
The Chicago premiere production opened at the Chopin Theatre on September 29, 2023, and played until December 10, after completely selling out the run of nine previews and 45 regular performances. This production was directed by Derek Van Barham and starred Kyle Patrick as Patrick Bateman. The production received four Joseph Jefferson awards, including Best Musical, Best Director, and Best Principal Performer.

=== Washington, D.C. (2024) ===
The Washington, D.C. area premiere production opened at Monumental Theatre Company on June 28, 2024, and ran through July 28. This production was directed by Michael Windsor, with Music Direction by Marika Countouris and starred Kyle Dalsimer as Patrick Bateman. Once again, the production was re-imagined, this time with an immersive experience in a black box theater, where the theatre is transformed to feel like a New York City club in the 1980s, with seating on three of four sides and an open bar throughout the performance. The production received two Helen Hayes Awards, including Best Ensemble and Best Lead Performance for Dalsimer.

=== Japan (2025) ===
A Japanese adaption opened at New National Theatre, Tokyo on March 30, 2025, and is scheduled to run through April 30, in multiple cities in Japan.

=== Houston (2025) ===
A revised version of the musical was staged by the Houston Broadway Theatre and ran from September 2, 2025, through September 14 at the Hobby Center. The production was directed by Joe Calarco and starred Robert Lenzi as Patrick Bateman.

=== London Revival (2026) ===
The show returned to the Almeida Theatre from January 24, 2026, and ran through until March 21, 2026, becoming Rupert Goold’s final show as artistic director at the venue; it was his first show as artistic director when it premiered in 2013. The cast, as revealed December 1, 2025, was led by Arty Froushan as Patrick Bateman and included Emily Barber as Evelyn Williams and Oli Higginson as Tim Price.

== Musical numbers ==
Sheik's music, as presented in London, was an entirely electronic score, with extracts from 1980s songs in-between. The London cast album was released on March 25, 2016.

=== London ===
Act I

- "Opening (Morning Routine)" - Patrick Bateman
- "Cards" - Patrick, Paul Owen, Tim Price, and Businessmen
- "You Are What You Wear" - Evelyn Williams, Courtney Lawrence, and Women
- "Oh Sri Lanka" - Patrick and Company
- "True Faith" - Company
- "Killing Time" - Patrick and Tim
- "In the Air Tonight" - Company
- "Hardbody" - Company
- "Hardbody Luis" - Luis Carruthers
- "If We Get Married" - Evelyn, Patrick, and Jean
- "Not a Common Man" - Patrick
- "Mistletoe Alert" - Patrick and Company
- "Hip to Be Square" - Patrick and Paul

Act II

- "Clean" - Patrick and Company
- "Killing Spree" - Patrick, Evelyn, Luis, and Company
- "Nice Thought" - Patrick's Mother, Jean, and Women
- "At the End of an Island / Hardbody Hamptons" - Patrick, Evelyn, and Company
- "I Am Back" - Patrick and Company
- "A Girl Before" - Jean
- "Don't You Want Me" - Company
- "This Is Not an Exit" - Patrick, Paul, and Company

=== Broadway ===
Act I

- "Opening (Morning Routine)" - Patrick Bateman
- "Selling Out" - Patrick and Company
- "Everybody Wants to Rule the World" - Jean and Company
- "Cards" - Paul Owen, Patrick, Tim Price, David Van Patten, Craig McDermott, and Luis Carruthers
- "You Are What You Wear" - Evelyn Williams, Courtney Lawrence, and Women
- "True Faith" - Vanden and Company
- "Killing Time" - Patrick and Tim
- "In the Air Tonight" - Women Soloists and Company
- "Hardbody" - Hardbody Trainer, McDermott, Van Patten, Luis, and Men
- "You Are What You Wear" (reprise) - Company
- "If We Get Married" - Evelyn, Patrick, and Jean
- "Not a Common Man" - Patrick
- "Mistletoe Alert" - Evelyn, Patrick, and Company
- "Hip to Be Square" - Patrick and Paul

Act II

- "Clean" - Patrick and Company
- "Killing Spree" - Patrick
- "Nice Thought" - Mrs. Bateman, Jean, and Women
- "At the End of an Island" - Evelyn, Patrick, and Company
- "I Am Back" - Patrick and Company
- "You Are What You Wear" (reprise)
- "A Girl Before" - Jean
- "Clean" (reprise) - Company
- "Don't You Want Me" - Paul, Sean Bateman, Carruthers, and Company
- "This Is Not an Exit" - Patrick and Company

=== London (2026 Revival) ===
Act I

- "Opening (Morning Routine)" - Patrick Bateman
- "Selling Out" - Patrick and Company
- "Everybody Wants to Rule the World" - Jean and Company
- "Cards" - Paul Owen, Patrick, Tim Price, David Van Patten, Craig McDermott, and Luis Carruthers
- "You Are What You Wear" - Evelyn Williams, Courtney Lawrence, and Women
- "The Death of Downtown" - Patrick and Company
- "True Faith" - Vanden and Company
- "Killing Time" / "Killing Time 2.0" - Patrick and Tim
- "In the Air Tonight" - Women Soloists and Company
- "Hardbody" - Hardbody Trainer, McDermott, Van Patten, Luis, and Men
- "You Are What You Wear" (reprise) - Company
- "If We Get Married" - Evelyn, Patrick, and Jean
- "Not a Common Man" - Patrick
- "Mistletoe Alert" - Evelyn, Patrick, Tim, and Company
- "Hip to Be Square" - Patrick and Paul

Act II

- "Clean" - Patrick and Company
- "Killing Spree" - Patrick
- "Nice Thought" - Mrs. Bateman, Jean, and Women
- "At the End of an Island" - Evelyn, Patrick, and Company
- "I Am Back" - Patrick and Company
- "You Are What You Wear" (reprise) - Company
- "A Girl Before" - Jean
- "Clean" (reprise) - Company
- "Don't You Want Me" - Company
- "This Is Not an Exit" - Patrick and Company

== Principal roles and cast members ==
Character	London	Broadway	Chicago	London Revival
Character	2013	2016	2023	2026
Patrick Bateman	Matt Smith	Benjamin Walker	Kyle Patrick	Arty Froushan
Paul Owen	Ben Aldridge	Drew Moerlein	John Drea	Daniel Bravo
Vanden	—N/a	Krystina Alabado	Hailey Brisard	Liz Kamille
Craig McDermott / ATM / Tom Cruise	Charlie Anson	Alex Michael Stoll	Jonathan Allsop	Jack Butterworth
Tim Price	Jonathan Bailey	Theo Stockman	Will Lidke	Oli Higginson
Courtney Lawrence	Katie Brayben	Morgan Weed	Danielle Smith	Tanisha Spring
Jean	Cassandra Compton	Jennifer Damiano	Sonia Goldberg	Anastasia Martin
Sabrina / Video Store Clerk	Holly Dale Spencer	Ericka Hunter	Emily Holland	Millie Mayhew
Evelyn Williams	Susannah Fielding	Heléne Yorke	Caleigh Pan-Kita	Emily Barber
Detective Donald Kimball	Simon Gregor	Keith Randolph Smith	Ryan Armstrong	Joseph Mydell
Christine / Hardbody Waitress / Hardbody Trainer	Holly James	Holly James	Quinn Simmons	Hannah Yun Chamberlain
Victoria / Hardbody Bartender	Lucie Jones	Anna Eilinsfeld	Anna Seibert	Asha Parker-Wallace
Sean Bateman / Security Guard / Dorsia Host	Tom Kay	Jason Hite	Kevin Parras	Alex James-Hatton
Patrick's Mother / Mrs Wolfe / Svetlana	Gillian Kirkpatrick	Alice Ripley	Amber Dow	Kim Ismay
David Van Patten	Eugene McCoy	Dave Thomas Brown	Evan B. Smith	Posi Morakinyo
Luis Carruthers	Hugh Skinner	Jordan Dean	Quinn Kelch	Zheng Xi Yong

== Critical reception ==
The London production of American Psycho received mixed to positive reviews from critics. Ellis is noted to have seen the Broadway production and "enjoyed it, spending the entire opening week promoting the show." Reviewing the Broadway production, Ben Brantley of the New York Times wrote "'American Psycho' is a mess. … And it’s not the kind of mess you wallow in, hooting at the glorious chaos of it all. Its conflicts of intention cancel one another out, leaving you numb." Variety's Marilyn Stasio praised the show's staging and ensemble cast while criticizing the writing and tone.

Aguirre-Sacasa saw the Chicago production and "had a bloody excellent time." Both Sheik and Aguirre-Sacasa gave rave reviews to the D.C. production, with Aguirre-Sacasa sharing on his Instagram that “It IS the goriest version I’ve seen to date, but also one of the most cohesive, rigorous, and well sung … 100% commitment from this young, fearless cast, led by (Kyle Dalsimer’s) unhinged Patrick Bateman and (Michael Windsor’s) bravura directing.” Missy Frederick of The Washington Post lauded the show as “undeniably disturbing.”

== References in popular culture ==
In "Chapter One Hundred and Twelve: American Psychos", a 2022 episode of the TV series Riverdale, Kevin Keller (Casey Cott) stages an amateur production of the musical at Riverdale High. Riverdale showrunner Roberto Aguirre-Sacasa wrote the book to the musical.

== Awards and nominations ==
=== Original Broadway production ===
Year	Award Ceremony	Category	Nominee	Result
2016	Tony Award	Best Scenic Design in a Musical	Es Devlin and Finn Ross	Nominated
2016	Tony Award	Best Lighting Design of a Musical	Justin Townsend	Nominated
2016	Drama Desk Award	Outstanding Actor in a Musical	Benjamin Walker	Nominated
2016	Drama Desk Award	Outstanding Director of a Musical	Rupert Goold	Nominated
2016	Drama Desk Award	Outstanding Choreography	Lynne Page	Nominated
2016	Drama Desk Award	Outstanding Scenic Design of a Musical	Es Devlin	Nominated
2016	Drama Desk Award	Outstanding Costume Design of a Musical	Katrina Lindsay	Nominated
2016	Drama Desk Award	Outstanding Lighting Design for a Musical	Justin Townsend	Won
2016	Drama Desk Award	Outstanding Projection Design	Finn Ross	Won
2016	Drama Desk Award	Outstanding Sound Design in a Musical	Dan Moses Schreier	Won
2016	Drama League Award	Outstanding Production of a Broadway or Off-Broadway Musical		Nominated
2016	Drama League Award	Distinguished Performance Award	Benjamin Walker	Nominated
2016	Outer Critics Circle Award	Outstanding New Broadway Musical		Nominated
2016	Outer Critics Circle Award	Outstanding New Score (Broadway or off-Broadway)	Duncan Sheik	Nominated
2016	Outer Critics Circle Award	Outstanding Director of a Musical	Rupert Goold	Nominated
2016	Outer Critics Circle Award	Outstanding Actor in a Musical	Benjamin Walker	Nominated
2016	Outer Critics Circle Award	Outstanding Featured Actress in a Musical	Heléne Yorke	Nominated
2016	Outer Critics Circle Award	Outstanding Costume Design (Play or Musical)	Katrina Lindsay	Nominated
2016	Outer Critics Circle Award	Outstanding Lighting Design (Play or Musical)	Justin Townsend	Won
2016	Outer Critics Circle Award	Outstanding Projection Design (Play or Musical)	Finn Ross	Won

=== 2026 London revival ===
Year	Award ceremony	Category	Nominee	Result
2026	Laurence Olivier Award	Best Musical Revival		Nominated
2026	Laurence Olivier Award	Best Theatre Choreographer	Lynne Page	Nominated
