= Patrice Covington =

American actress

- Occupation: Actress
- Years active: 2009–present

Patrice Covington is an American actress and singer, known for her performances in Broadway musicals, television, and film.

== Life and career ==
Covington began singing in church when she was a child. She made her stage debut in 2009-2010 tour of Dreamgirls, and later performed on Ain't Misbehavin', The Book of Mormon - Jumamosi and Motown The Musical. In 2011 she released self-titled EP and later worked as a background singer for Jennifer Hudson, Stevie Wonder and Christina Aguilera. In 2015 made her Broadway debut in The Color Purple playing Squeak and as understudy for Joaquina Kalukango in the role of Nettie. Along with cast she received Daytime Emmy Award for Outstanding Musical Performance in a Daytime Program for performance on Today Show.

In 2018, Covington starred in Old Globe Theatre's original production of musical The Heart of Rock and Roll. In 2021 she played singer Erma Franklin in the National Geographic biographical series, Genius: Aretha alongside her The Color Purple co-star, Cynthia Erivo. In 2022 she had the recurring role in the Amazon comedy-drama series, A League of Their Own. In 2023 she made her film debut starring in the musical mockumentary Bootyology. She also made guest starring appearances in All Rise and Chicago P.D.. In 2024 she played the leading role in the BET+ drama film, For What It's Worth.
