= Hip to Be Square =

1986 single by Huey Lewis and the News

Single by Huey Lewis and the News

from the album Fore!
- B-side: "Some of My Lies Are True" (Remix)
- Released: October 6, 1986
- Recorded: 1986
- Genre: Pop rock; dance-rock
- Length: 4:01
- Label: Chrysalis
- Songwriters: Bill Gibson; Sean Hopper; Huey Lewis
- Producer: Huey Lewis and the News

Huey Lewis and the News singles chronology
"Stuck with You" (1986)	"Hip to Be Square" (1986)	"Jacob's Ladder" (1986)

"Hip to Be Square" is a song by Huey Lewis and the News, written by Bill Gibson, Sean Hopper, and Huey Lewis, and released in 1986 as the second single from the multi-platinum album Fore!

The song features San Francisco 49ers players Joe Montana, Ronnie Lott, Dwight Clark, and Riki Ellison singing backup vocals. The single reached number three on the Billboard Hot 100. In later concerts, Lewis performed the song as "(Too) Hip to Be Square", as performed on their live album, Live at 25.

== Composition ==
In a 2008 interview with Entertainment Weekly, Lewis stated he originally wrote the song's lyrics in the third person, "He used to be a renegade...". He referenced the book Bobos in Paradise in describing the song's inspiration, explaining that "Hip to Be Square" was about the "phenomenon where people from the '60s started to drop back in, cut their hair, work out, that kind of crap, but they kept their bohemian tastes. ... bourgeois bohemians." Lewis later modified the lyrics to be in the first person as he believed it would enhance the joke, but stated this had unintentionally led to the interpretation of the song as an "anthem for square people".

== Reception ==
Billboard said that "this bouncy stomp should find a wide constituency identifying with the lyrics." Cash Box said that "utilizing the 'Power of Love' formula," it "jumps off to a quick start and drives home the populist message of its title."

== Appearances ==
=== American Psycho ===
The song is referred to in the novel American Psycho when the main character, Patrick Bateman, provides a lengthy critique of Huey Lewis and the News' career.

The song was then featured in the film adaptation during a scene in which Bateman (played by Christian Bale) gives an abridged version of his critique from the novel to his coworker Paul Allen (Jared Leto) just before murdering him with an axe:

"In '87, Huey released this ... Fore!, their most accomplished album. I think their undisputed masterpiece is 'Hip to Be Square,' a song so catchy, most people probably don't listen to the lyrics. But they should, because it's not just about the pleasures of conformity, and the importance of trends, it's also a personal statement about the band itself."

The song was originally featured on the accompanying soundtrack, but shortly after it was released, the album was pulled from the shelves and the song was removed before being reissued, although a small number had already been sold. Reports erroneously claimed that Lewis had objected to the context in which his song was used in the film and demanded it be removed from the album. In reality, the film's production team had paid for the rights to use the song in the film, but overlooked receiving the rights to include it on the soundtrack. When the soundtrack was released with the song on it, Lewis had it withdrawn, as the soundtrack rights had not been secured.

In 2013, Lewis himself guest starred in a parody of the scene with "Weird Al" Yankovic for comedy website Funny or Die.

In 2021, metalcore band Ice Nine Kills released "Hip to Be Scared" as the lead single from their album The Silver Scream 2: Welcome to Horrorwood. In addition to the title being a direct reference, the song and video featured an interpolation of the main melody from "Hip to Be Square" during a skit which parodies Bateman's critique of the band.

=== Sesame Street ===
The popular children's show Sesame Street created an educational parody of the song called "Hip to Be a Square" and used it during a cartoon portion of the program. Lewis said of the parody, "they contacted our publisher about doing it, and we were happy to let 'em. I think it's sweet."

== Track listing ==
7-inch single

1. "Hip to Be Square"
2. "Some of My Lies Are True" (remix)

12-inch single

- Remixed by Shep Pettibone
1. "Hip to Be Square" (dance remix) – 6:05
2. "Hip to Be Square" (dub mix) – 5:11

== Personnel ==
- Huey Lewis – lead vocals
- Sean Hopper – keyboards, backing vocals
- Bill Gibson – drums, percussion, backing vocals
- Johnny Colla – rhythm guitar, backing vocals
- Mario Cipollina – bass
- Chris Hayes – lead guitar, backing vocals

Additional personnel

- Stephen "Doc" Kupka – tenor saxophone
- Ralph Arista – backing vocals
- Dwight Clark – backing vocals
- Mike Duke – backing vocals
- Riki Ellison – backing vocals
- Jerome Fletcher – backing vocals
- Ronnie Lott – backing vocals
- Joe Montana – backing vocals
- Jim Moran – backing vocals

== Charts ==
Chart (1986–1987)	Peak position
Australia (Kent Music Report)	17
Canada Top Singles (RPM)	14
Canada Retail Singles (The Record)	9
Europe (Eurochart Hot 100)	92
Europe (European Hit Radio)	5
Finland (Suomen virallinen lista)	12
Ireland (IRMA)	29
Israel (IBA)	26
Netherlands (Single Top 100)	28
New Zealand (Recorded Music NZ)	9
Spain (AFYVE)	32
Spain Airplay (Top 40 Radio)	4
UK Singles (OCC)	41
UK Airplay (Music & Media)	3
US Billboard Hot 100	3
US Adult Contemporary (Billboard)	20
US Album Rock Tracks (Billboard)	1
US Cash Box Top 100	6

Year-end chart (1987)	Position
US Top Pop Singles (Billboard)	49

== Certifications ==
Region	Certification	Certified units/sales
New Zealand (RMNZ)	Gold	15,000^{‡}
United Kingdom (BPI)	Silver	200,000^{‡}
^{‡} Sales+streaming figures based on certification alone.

== See also ==
- List of Billboard Mainstream Rock number-one songs of the 1980s
