= Stuck with You =

1986 single by Huey Lewis and the News

Single by Huey Lewis and the News

from the album Fore!
- B-side: "Don't Ever Tell Me That You Love Me" (remix)
- Released: July 16, 1986
- Genre: Pop; doo-wop
- Length: 4:29
- Label: Chrysalis
- Songwriters: Chris Hayes; Huey Lewis
- Producers: Huey Lewis and the News

Huey Lewis and the News singles chronology
"The Power of Love" (1985)	"Stuck with You" (1986)	"Hip to Be Square" (1986)

Official video
- "Stuck With You" on YouTube

"Stuck with You" is a song by American rock band Huey Lewis and the News, written by guitarist Chris Hayes and lead singer Huey Lewis. Released in 1986, it was the first single from the band's fourth album, Fore! (1986). The song spent three weeks at number one on the US Billboard Hot 100, becoming the band's second number-one hit on the chart. Internationally, the song reached number 12 on the UK Singles Chart, topped the charts of Canada and Zimbabwe, and peaked within the top 10 in Australia, Iceland, New Zealand, and South Africa.

== Origin ==
According to Lewis, the song was written about a girl he liked; however, she did not like the song once he revealed it to her. Co-writer Chris Hayes said the song's structure was influenced by the 1982 Donald Fagen song "I.G.Y. (What a Beautiful World)".

== Reception ==
Cash Box called it a "romantic pop song." Billboard said it has "a skewed love lyric set to street-corner harmonizing."

== Music video ==
The music video for "Stuck with You" was filmed in the Bahamas in July 1986 and features Keely Shaye Smith. The island that Lewis and Smith wind up on is a small island about ten miles from Paradise Island in Nassau. The video was filmed on land, on water, underwater, and from the air. The band, the crew and all the extras used in the island barbecue scene had to stay on a barge moored off the island so that they wouldn't be seen. The costumes were designed by Bambi Breakstone who designed the costumes for the 2nd season of Miami Vice (1985/1986).

The video was directed by Edd Griles, who had previously directed the band's videos for "The Heart of Rock & Roll" and "If This Is It", as well as Cyndi Lauper's "Girls Just Want to Have Fun" and "Time After Time".

== Track listings ==
- 7-inch single

A. "Stuck with You" – 4:20
B. "Don't Ever Tell Me That You Love Me" (remix) – 2:59

- 12-inch and cassette single
1. "Stuck with You" – 4:20
2. "Don't Ever Tell Me That You Love Me" (remix) – 2:59
3. "The Heart of Rock & Roll" (live) – 5:10
4. "Trouble in Paradise" (live) – 4:15

== Charts ==
=== Weekly charts ===
Chart (1986)	Peak position
Australia (Kent Music Report)	2
Austria (Ö3 Austria Top 40)	23
Belgium (Ultratop 50 Flanders)	25
Canada Retail Singles (The Record)	3
Canada Top Singles (RPM)	1
Canada Adult Contemporary (RPM)	1
Europe (Eurochart Hot 100)	9
Europe (European Hit Radio)	1
Finland (Suomen virallinen lista)	15
Iceland (Íslenski listinn)	5
Ireland (IRMA)	11
Israel (IBA)	16
Netherlands (Dutch Top 40)	16
Netherlands (Single Top 100)	21
New Zealand (Recorded Music NZ)	2
South Africa (Springbok Radio)	5
Spain (AFYVE)	11
Spain Airplay (Top 40 Radio)	1
Sweden (Sverigetopplistan)	14
Switzerland (Schweizer Hitparade)	14
UK Singles (Official Charts)	12
UK Airplay (Music & Media)	4
US Billboard Hot 100	1
US Adult Contemporary (Billboard)	1
US Mainstream Rock (Billboard)	2
West Germany (GfK)	15
Zimbabwe (ZIMA)	1

=== Year-end charts ===
Chart (1986)	Position
Australia (Kent Music Report)	13
Canada Top Singles (RPM)	21
Europe (European Hot 100 Singles)	73
New Zealand (RIANZ)	16
UK Singles (OCC)	86
US Billboard Hot 100	21

== Certifications ==
Region	Certification	Certified units/sales
Canada (Music Canada)	Gold	50,000^{^}
New Zealand (RMNZ)	Platinum	30,000^{‡}
^{^} Shipments figures based on certification alone.^{‡} Sales+streaming figures based on certification alone.

== Release history ==
Region	Date	Format(s)	Label(s)	Ref.
United States	July 16, 1986	7-inch vinyl	Chrysalis	
United Kingdom	August 11, 1986	7-inch vinyl; 12-inch vinyl	Chrysalis	

== See also ==
- List of Billboard Hot 100 number-one singles of 1986
- List of number-one adult contemporary singles of 1986 (U.S.)
- List of number-one singles of 1986 (Canada)
