= Doing It All for My Baby =

1987 single by Huey Lewis and the News

Single by Huey Lewis and the News

from the album Fore!
- B-side: "Naturally"
- Released: June 29, 1987
- Genre: Pop; rock
- Length: 3:39
- Label: Chrysalis
- Songwriters: Mike Duke; Phil Cody
- Producers: Huey Lewis and the News

Huey Lewis and the News singles chronology
"Simple as That" (1987)	"Doing It All for My Baby" (1987)	"Perfect World" (1988)

"Doing It All for My Baby" is a song performed by Huey Lewis and the News, released as a single from the album Fore! in 1987. The single peaked at number six on the U.S. Billboard Hot 100 on September 19, 1987, becoming the fifth top-ten hit from the album and making the band the first group to have five top-ten Hot 100 singles from one album.

== History ==
The song was written by Mike Duke and Phil Cody. Duke wrote the song and then recorded vocals himself (with Huey Lewis and the News playing backing parts and instruments) with the intention of getting a record contract for his own solo career. When that plan fell through, Lewis decided to record a version with his own vocals for the album. Duke had previously written the song, "Hope You Love Me Like You Say You Do", the News' second top 40 hit from the 1982 album, Picture This, and went on to write, "Let Her Go and Start Over," a minor adult contemporary hit for the band, from the album, Plan B, in 2001.

Cash Box called it a "lively gospel-inflected organ howl spices up the romantic lyric, punctuated by brassy horn charts and a medium-grooving tempo."

== Music video ==
The music video for "Doing It All for My Baby" was a parody of monster movies and was over 7 minutes long. Lewis appears as himself, the Dr. Frankenstein character, and the singing monster. Dracula is portrayed by bass player Mario Cippolina, who is shown placing his own disembodied head in a jar on a table (the camera then pans along the table to show the jarred heads of the rest of the News). Cippolina also appears as half of the two-headed creature with drummer Bill Gibson. Igor is played by keyboarder Sean Hopper. Saxophonist Johnny Colla plays the guy who loses his teeth on the guitar while trying to mimic Jimi Hendrix. The Tower of Power horn section (Greg Adams, Lee Thornburg, Richard Elliot, Emilio Castillo and Stephen Kupka) is shown chained to the back wall playing their horns while Lewis as Frankenstein sings into a steaming test tube. Band manager Bob Brown appears as the dead man in the electric chair. The video ends with Igor foolishly throwing a large switch, turning the singing monster back into Huey Lewis and the bride of Frankenstein's monster screaming in horror.

The video was filmed in Los Angeles and the Bride of Frankenstein's monster was played by model Tara Shannon. The video took three days to produce and Lewis considered it his least favorite video to take part in because of the amount of time spent getting makeup applied on him and the band.

== Chart performance ==
Chart (1987)	Peak position
Australia (Kent Music Report)	93
Canada Top Singles (RPM)	30
Israel (IBA)	23
UK Singles (OCC)	93
US Billboard Hot 100	6
US Billboard Adult Contemporary	2

Year-end chart (1987)	Position
US Top Pop Singles (Billboard)	93
