= Patrick Bateman =

Protagonist from American Psycho

- Christian Bale as Patrick Bateman in American Psycho (2000)
- First appearance: The Rules of Attraction (1987)
- Last appearance: Lunar Park (2005)
- Created by: Bret Easton Ellis
- Portrayed by: Nigel Paul Redding (cover of American Psycho); Christian Bale (American Psycho); Dechen Thurman (This Is Not an Exit); Michael Kremko (American Psycho 2); Casper Van Dien (The Rules of Attraction, deleted scene); Matt Smith and Benjamin Walker (American Psycho: The Musical); Casey Cott (as Kevin Keller in Riverdale: American Psychos)

In-universe information
- Aliases: Pat Bateman; Marcus Halberstam (Marcus Halberstram); Paul Owen (Paul Allen)
- Gender: Male
- Title: Vice President
- Occupation: Investment banker
- Family: Sean Bateman (younger brother)
- Nationality: American
- Education: Phillips Exeter Academy; Harvard College; Harvard Business School

Patrick Bateman is a fictional character created by novelist Bret Easton Ellis. He is the villain protagonist and unreliable narrator of Ellis's 1991 novel American Psycho and is played by Christian Bale in the 2000 film adaptation of the same name. Bateman is a wealthy and materialistic yuppie and Wall Street investment banker, who leads a secret life as a serial killer. He has also appeared in other Ellis novels and their film and theatrical adaptations.

The film later developed a cult following among Generation Z viewers who see Bateman as a memetic cultural icon. Memes featuring Bateman have proliferated across various online communities, some of which portray Bateman as an ideal representation of a "sigma male".

== Biography and profile ==
At the beginning of American Psycho, Bateman is a 27-year-old successful specialist in mergers and acquisitions with the fictitious Wall Street investment firm Pierce & Pierce (also Sherman McCoy's firm in The Bonfire of the Vanities). He lives at 55 West 81st Street on the Upper West Side of Manhattan, on the 11th floor of the American Gardens Building, where he is a neighbor of actor Tom Cruise. Unbeknownst to his peers, Bateman is a serial killer, murdering a variety of people, including colleagues, the homeless, and prostitutes. His crimes, including rape, torture, necrophilia, and cannibalism, are graphically described in the novel. Some were removed from the film adaptation.

Bateman was born on 23 October 1961 and comes from a wealthy family. His parents have a house on Long Island, and he mentions a summer house in Newport. His parents divorced sometime earlier, and his mother resides in a sanatorium. His father, who first appeared in Ellis's preceding novel The Rules of Attraction, grew up on an estate in Connecticut, and now owns an apartment in the Carlyle Hotel in Manhattan. He is assumed to be dead, as he is mentioned only in the past tense in the novel.

Mary Harron's 2000 adaptation, however, mentions that Bateman's father "practically owns" the company at which Bateman works, implying that Bateman's father is still alive. Bateman's younger brother Sean attends Camden College and is a protagonist of The Rules of Attraction, in which Patrick Bateman was first introduced. Bateman attended prominent Phillips Exeter Academy for preparatory school. He graduated from Harvard College and Harvard Business School, and then moved to New York City.

By the end of the novel, he believes he is about to be arrested for murdering a colleague named Paul Owen (Paul Allen in the film) and leaves a message on his lawyer's answering machine confessing to his crimes. When he runs into his lawyer at a party, however, the man mistakes him for somebody else and tells him that the message must have been a joke, as he had met with Allen only days earlier. Bateman realizes that the punishment and notoriety he desires will be forever out of his reach, and that he is trapped inside a meaningless existence: "This is not an exit".

== Personality ==
As written by Ellis, Bateman is the ultimate stereotype of yuppie greed – wealthy, superficial, obsessed with status, and addicted to sex, drugs, and conspicuous consumption. All of his friends look alike to him, to the point that he often confuses one for another. They also often confuse him for other people. Bateman delights in obsessively detailing virtually every single feature of his wealthy lifestyle, including his designer clothes, workout routine, business cards, alcoholic drinks, and elaborate high-end stereo and home theater sound system.

Bateman is engaged to an equally wealthy, shallow woman named Evelyn Richards and has a mistress on the side named Courtney Lawrence, the girlfriend of Luis Carruthers (a closeted homosexual whom Bateman despises). Bateman has regular liaisons with prostitutes and women he encounters at clubs, many of whom end up being his victims. The one woman and possibly the only person in his life for whom he has anything approaching feelings is his secretary, Jean. He feels that she is the only person in his life who is not completely shallow, so he cannot bring himself to seduce or kill her. He casually acknowledges her as "Jean, my secretary who is in love with me" and introduces her in the narration as someone whom he "will probably end up married to someday".

Despite his affluence and high social status, Bateman is constantly plagued by unsettling feelings of anxiety and low self-esteem. He kills many of his victims because they make him feel inadequate, usually by having better taste than he does. He is hated by others as much as he hates them; his friends mock him as the "boy next door", his own lawyer refers to him as a "bloody ass-kisser... a brown-nosing goody-goody", and he is often dismissed as "yuppie trash" by people outside his social circle. Bateman often expresses doubts regarding his own sanity, and he has periodic attacks of psychosis, during which he hallucinates. Interpretation as to whether Bateman actually commits the crimes he describes, or whether he is merely hallucinating them is left open to reader; he is, therefore, an unreliable narrator. Screenwriter Guinevere Turner confirmed that, at least in the film, Patrick Bateman is not imagining every act of violence: "Anything that seems unreal in the film to you personally might be unreal. But somewhere under everything you see, no matter how implausible it seems, real murders in some form are taking place."

In the climax of the film adaptation, Bateman calls his lawyer and leaves a lengthy, detailed message confessing all of his crimes. He later runs into his lawyer, who mistakes him for someone else and dismisses the confession as a joke, while also claiming to have had dinner with one of Bateman's victims after he had supposedly killed him, leaving the supposed reality of Bateman's murders open to interpretation.

Although Bateman often claims that he is devoid of emotion, he also describes experiencing moments of extreme rage, panic, or grief—being on the "verge of tears"—often over trivial inconveniences such as remembering to return videotapes or trying to obtain dinner reservations. In the middle of dismembering a victim, he breaks down, sobbing that he "just wants to be loved". He takes psychotropic drugs, including Xanax, to control these emotions. He publicly espouses a philosophy of tolerance, equality, and "traditional moral values" because he thinks it will make him more likable, but he is actually virulently racist, homophobic, and antisemitic.

Bateman compensates for his anxiety through obsessive vanity and personal grooming, with unwavering attention to detail. He buys the most fashionable, expensive clothing and accessories possible, including Salvatore Ferragamo, Alan Flusser, and Valentino suits, Oliver Peoples glasses, and Jean Paul Gaultier, Louis Vuitton, and Bottega Veneta leather goods, as a means of effecting some "control" over his otherwise chaotic life. Likewise, while often being confused about people's names and identities, he categorizes them by what they wear and how they look because they are more easily "understood" in terms of labels and stereotypes. Bateman's apartment also is firmly controlled in terms of look and taste, with the latest music, food, and art.

Bateman kills more or less indiscriminately, with no preferred type of victim, targeting any woman, man, and animal who gets in his way, and no consistent or preferred method of killing. He kills women mostly for sadistic sexual pleasure, often during or just after sex. He kills men because they upset or annoy him or make him feel inferior. In one scene of the novel (omitted in the film), Bateman kills a child just to see if he would enjoy it; he does not because he believes that the child's death would not affect as many people as an adult's would. Periodically, he matter-of-factly confesses his crimes to his friends, co-workers, and even complete strangers ("I like to dissect girls, did you know I'm utterly insane?") just to see if they are actually listening to him. They either are not, think that he is joking, or completely misunderstand what he says.

== Outside American Psycho ==
Bateman made his first appearance in Ellis's 1987 novel The Rules of Attraction (in which Sean, his brother, is the protagonist); no indication is given that he is a serial killer. Bateman also makes a short appearance in Ellis's 1998 novel Glamorama, with "strange stains" on the lapel of his Armani suit. Bateman also appeared in the American Psycho 2000 e-mails, which were written as an advertising campaign for the movie. Although they are often mistakenly credited to Ellis, they were actually written by one or more unnamed authors and approved by Ellis before being sent out. American Psycho 2000 served as a sort of "e-sequel" to the original novel. The e-mails take place in 2000, a little over a decade since the novel. Bateman is in psychotherapy with "Dr M". He is also married to Jean, his former secretary; they have a son, Patrick Bateman Jr. (P.B.), who is eight years old. In the story, Bateman talks about therapy, trying to get a divorce from Jean, his renewed feelings about murder, and idolizing his son. The end reveals that the "real" Bateman, who "writes" the e-mails, is the owner of the company that produces the movie.

Bateman appeared in Ellis's 2005 novel Lunar Park, in which a fictionalized version of Ellis confesses that writing American Psycho felt like channeling the words of a violent spirit rather than writing anything himself. This ghost—Bateman—haunts Ellis's home. A character also comes to Ellis's Halloween party dressed as Patrick Bateman, and a copycat killer is seemingly patterning himself on Bateman. Toward the novel's end, Ellis writes the last Bateman story as a way of confronting and controlling the character, as well as the issues Ellis created Bateman as a means of countering. Bateman, for all intents and purposes, dies in a fire on a boat dock.

== In media ==
Though Christian Bale had been the first choice for the part by both Ellis and Harron, the role only attracted his attention after his agent told him that playing Bateman would be "professional suicide". Johnny Depp, Keanu Reeves, Edward Norton, Ewan McGregor, and Brad Pitt were also considered for the role at various points in the development process. The film's producers initially wanted Leonardo DiCaprio in the role, but Ellis (as explained in the American Psycho DVD) decided he would appear too young. DiCaprio ultimately declined the part after talking to feminist author and activist Gloria Steinem, who told him that the teenaged girls in his fanbase following Titanic would react negatively to the violence against women portrayed in the film.

Bateman was also portrayed by Dechen Thurman, Uma Thurman's brother, in the 2000 documentary This Is Not an Exit: The Fictional World of Bret Easton Ellis. Michael Kremko played Bateman in the standalone sequel American Psycho 2, in which the character is killed by a would-be victim. Aside from the character appearing in the film, the sequel has no other connection to the previous film and has been denounced by Ellis.

Scenes with the character were shot for the 2002 film adaptation of The Rules of Attraction. Ellis revealed in an interview that director Roger Avary asked Bale to reprise the role, but Bale turned down the offer, and Avary asked Ellis himself to portray Bateman. Ellis refused, stating that he "thought it was such a terrible and gimmicky idea", and Avary eventually shot the scenes with Casper Van Dien. The scenes, however, were ultimately cut from the final version of the film. In a 2009 interview with Black Book, director Mary Harron said, "We talked about how Martian-like [the character] Patrick Bateman was, how he was looking at the world like somebody from another planet, watching what people did and trying to work out the right way to behave, and then one day [Christian] called me and he had been watching Tom Cruise on David Letterman, and he just had this very intense friendliness with nothing behind the eyes, and he was really taken with this energy."

Doctor Who star Matt Smith played the role in the 2013 stage musical version of the novel, with music and lyrics by Duncan Sheik and a book by Roberto Aguirre-Sacasa, at London's Almeida Theatre. In 2016, Benjamin Walker portrayed Bateman in a Broadway production of the musical, which ran from March 21 to June 5, 2016.

Patrick Bateman is used as an alias by Dexter Morgan in the Showtime series Dexter. Dexter, a serial killer as well, uses the alias "Dr. Patrick Bateman" to acquire M-99 for the use of incapacitating his victims as revealed in "Return to Sender". The Dexter: Resurrection episode "Backseat Driver" reveals that American Psycho was a formative read for Dexter, hence his choice of alias. In the Dexter: Original Sin episode "Miami Vice", Vince Masuka makes a younger Dexter a fake ID as Patrick Bateman, believing it is to allow Dexter to sneak into a party. Instead, Dexter uses it to stalk his second victim.

In the television series Riverdale, Kevin Keller (portrayed by Casey Cott) performs in a musical production of American Psycho as Bateman in the sixth-season episode "Chapter One Hundred and Twelve: American Psychos". A recurring character in the video game Criminal Case is named Christian Bateman (a combination of the names Christian Bale and Patrick Bateman) modeled after the character. American rock duo Local H released their song "Patrick Bateman" as the lead single from their 2020 album Lifers. Metalcore band Ice Nine Kills released a single titled "Hip to Be Scared" based upon the film adaptation for their album The Silver Scream 2: Welcome to Horrorwood. Bateman was an influence to the titular character in Who's Watching Oliver and was compared to the main character in Continuance.

In February 2024, a remake of the 2000 film was announced as being in development. A screenwriter was being sought, and the film was to take place in modern times. In October 2024, the film was revealed to be a new adaptation of Ellis' novel to be directed by Luca Guadagnino from a script by Scott Z. Burns, with Austin Butler reportedly in talks to play Bateman, although as of June 2026, there is no official actor attached to the role.
