= Bill Gibson (drummer) =

- Born: November 13, 1951 (age 73); Sacramento, California, United States
- Genres: pop
- Instrument: Drums
- Years active: 1970s-present
- Member of: Huey Lewis and the News, Sons of Champlin

Bill Gibson is an American drummer. Since 1979, he has been the drummer for Huey Lewis and the News. Since the band's hiatus in 2020, he is currently a member of the Sons of Champlin.

== Biography ==
Gibson was born in Sacramento to Edward and Phyllis Gibson. Gibson started playing the drums at age twelve. His father, Ed, was an architect, and played drums after finishing work for the day. He was influenced by Art Blakey and Buddy Rich. In 1967, his father took him to the Monterey Jazz Festival. He eventually acquired his first drum kit at fourteen, and as a teenager saw The Beatles twice, and The Dave Clark Five.

Bill joined Huey Lewis and the News as drummer in 1979. The News' sound draws upon early pop, R&B, doo-wop, blue-eyed soul and new wave.
