= List of applications of stainless steel =

Stainless steel is used in a multitude of fields including architecture, art, chemical engineering, food and beverage manufacture, vehicles, medicine, energy and firearms.

== Architecture ==
The use of stainless steel in buildings can be both practical and aesthetic. In vogue during the Art Deco period, the most famous use of stainless steel can be seen in the upper portion of the Chrysler Building. Thanks to its durability, many of these buildings have retained their original appearance.

Stainless steel is used in the construction of modern buildings, such as the exterior of the Petronas Twin Towers and the Jin Mao Building. The Parliament House of Australia in Canberra has a stainless steel flagpole weighing over 220 metric tons (240 short tons). The largest stainless steel building in North America is the aeration building in the Edmonton Composting Facility. La Geode in Paris has a dome composed of 6433 polished stainless steel triangles that form the sphere that reflects the sky. The development of high-strength stainless steel grades, such as "lean duplex" grades, has led to increasing use in structural applications.

Thanks to its low reflectivity, stainless steel is used as a roofing material for airports, which prevents pilots from being dazzled. It is also used for its ability to keep the surface of the roof close to ambient temperature. Examples of such airports include the Sacramento International Airport in California and the Hamad International Airport in Qatar.

Stainless steel is used for pedestrian and road bridges in the form of tubes, plates, or reinforcing bars. Examples include: the Cala Galdana Bridge in Menorca, the first stainless steel road bridge to be built; the Champlain Bridge in Montreal; the Oudesluijs bridge in Amsterdam, a bridge made using Construction 3D printing; the Padre Arrupe Bridge in Bilbao, which links the Guggenheim Museum Bilbao to the University of Deusto. the Sant Fruitos Pedestrian Bridge in Spain; Stonecutter's Bridge, Hong Kong; and The Helix Bridge, a pedestrian bridge in Singapore.

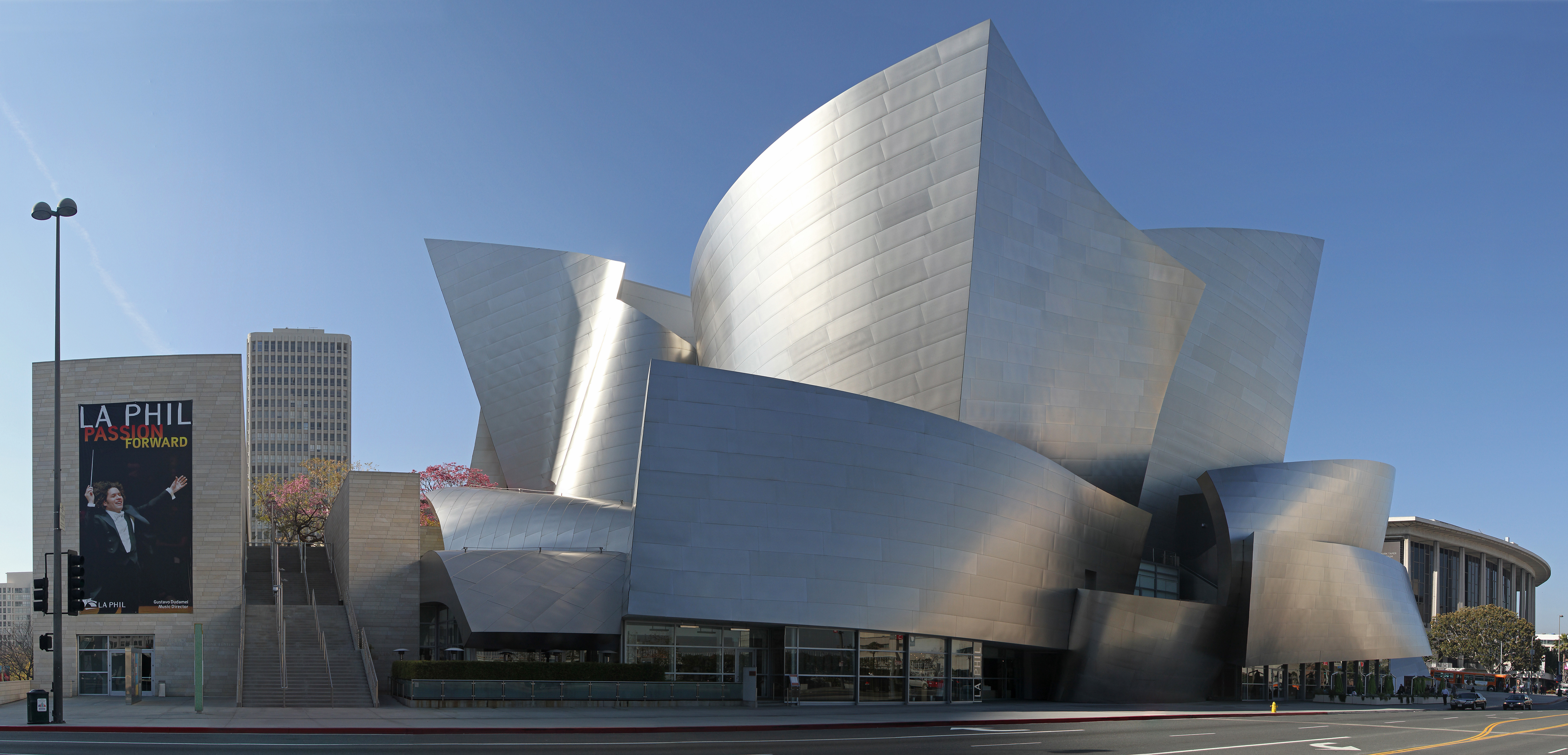
Stainless steel cladding is used on the Walt Disney Concert Hall

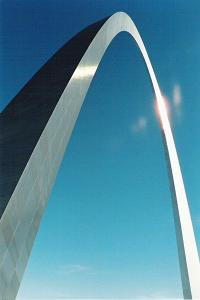
The 630-foot-high (190 m), stainless-clad (type 304) Gateway Arch defines St. Louis's skyline

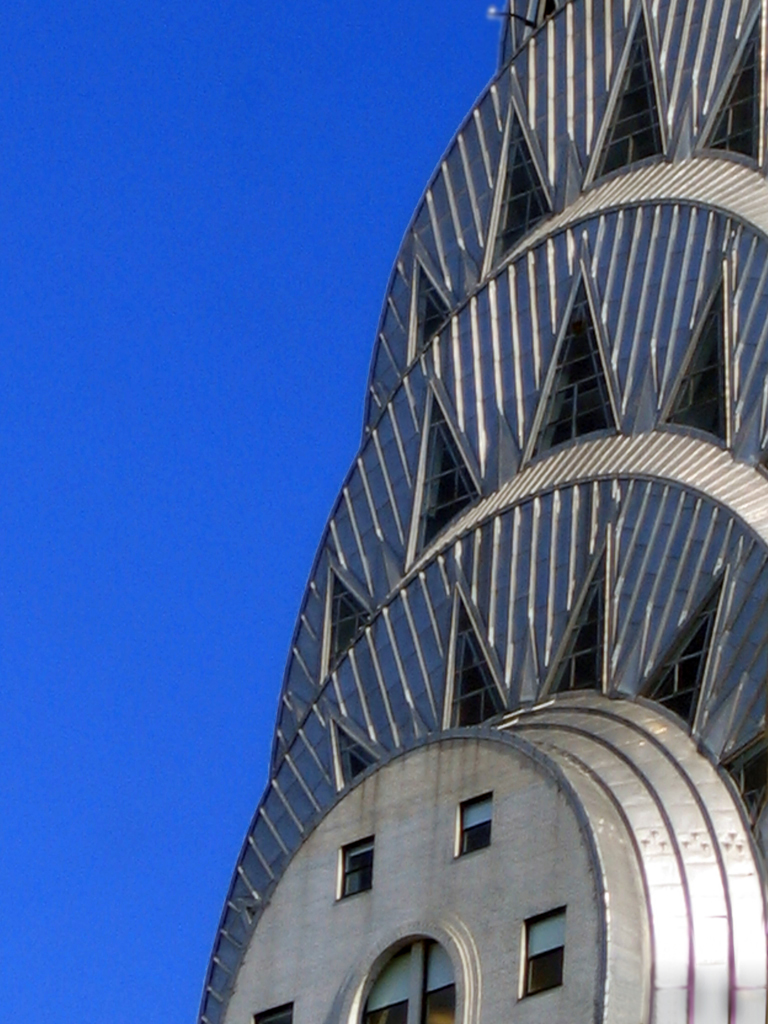
The pinnacle of New York's Chrysler Building is clad with Nirosta stainless steel, a form of Type 302

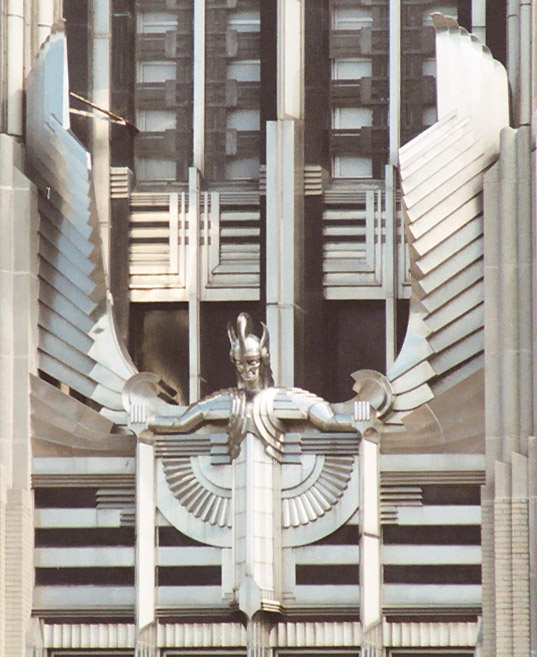
An Art Deco sculpture on the Niagara-Mohawk Power building in Syracuse, New York

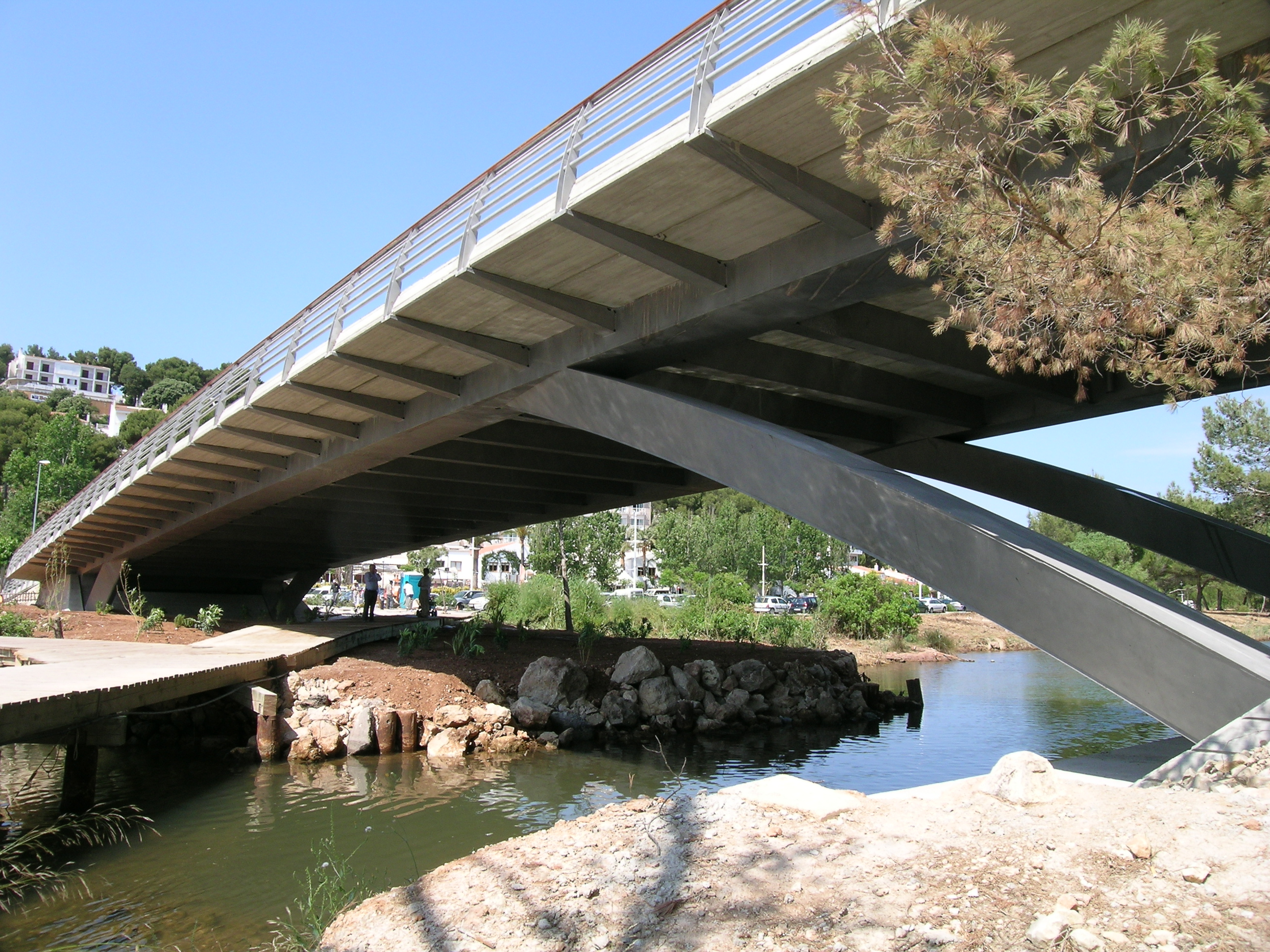
The Cala Galdana Bridge, Menorca

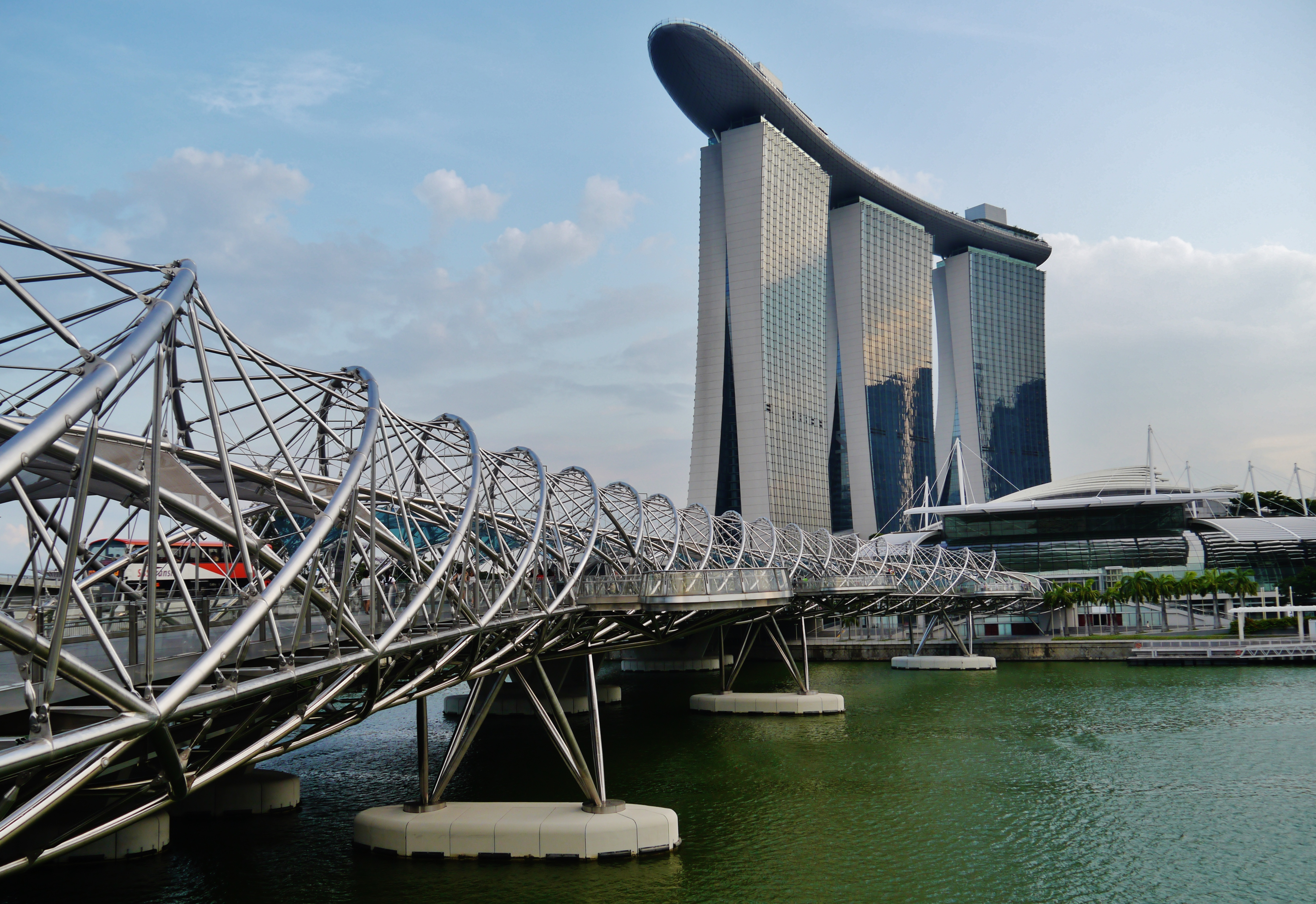
Helix Bridge, Singapore

== Art and monuments ==
=== Americas ===
- Cloud Gate, a sculpture by Anish Kapoor. (Chicago, United States)
- Estacas, a sculpture by Ken Bortolazzo, created in 2009. Displayed at the Museum of Outdoor Arts in Greenwood Village, Colorado.
- Gateway Arch (pictured) is clad entirely in stainless steel: 886 tons (804 metric tons) of 0.25 in (6.4 mm) plate, #3 finish, type 304 stainless steel. (St. Louis, United States)
- Jaime Latapí López's Cristo de Chiapas. Created in 2007. (Tuxla Guttierez, Mexico)
- Metamorphosis by David Černỳ. Created in 2011 (Charlotte, United States)
- Unisphere, constructed as the theme symbol of the 1964 New York World's Fair, is constructed of Type 304L stainless steel as a spherical framework with a diameter of 120 feet (37 m). (New York City, United States)
- United States Air Force Memorial has an austenitic stainless steel structural skin. (Arlington, United States)

=== Asia ===
- The Blossom pavilion by Zhan Wang. Created in 2015. (Shanghai, China)

=== Europe ===
- Worker and Kolkhoz Woman by Vera Mukhina. Created in 1937. (Moscow, Russia)
- The aluminium cladding of the spheres and tubes of the Atomium was renovated with stainless-steel cladding in 2006. (Brussels, Belgium)
- Juraj Jánošík monument (Terchova, Slovakia)
- La Danse de la fontaine émergente by Chen Zhen. Created in 2008. (Paris, France)
- Man of Steel, currently under construction. (Rotherham, England)
- The Sibelius Monument is made entirely of stainless steel tubes (Helsinki, Finland)
- Sun Voyager by Jon Gunnar Arnason, 9 m × 18 m × 7 m. Created in 1990. (Reykjavik, Iceland)
- The Big Elk by Linda Bakke. Created in 2015. (Stor-Elvdal, Norway)
- The Kelpies (Falkirk, Scotland)
- A Sea of Steel consists of fourteen steel sculptures by different artists. (Wijk aan Zee, the Netherlands)

== Water ==
Stainless steels have a long history of application in contact with water due to their excellent corrosion resistance. Applications include a range of conditions including plumbing, potable water and wastewater treatment, desalination, and brine treatment. Types 304 and 316 stainless steels are standard materials of construction in contact with water. However, with increasing chloride contents, higher alloyed stainless steels such as Type 2205 and super austenitic and super duplex stainless steels are used.

Important considerations to achieve optimum corrosion performance are:

- the correct grade choice for the chloride content of the water;
- avoidance of crevices when possible by good design;
- adherence to good fabrication practices, particularly removing weld heat tint;
- prompt drainage after hydrotesting.

The use of stainless steel piping has helped to reduce the losses of drinking water in Tokyo, Seoul, and Taipei.

== Pulp, paper, and biomass conversion ==
Stainless steels are used extensively in the pulp and paper industry to avoid iron contamination of the product and because of their corrosion resistance to the various chemicals used in the papermaking process. For example, duplex stainless steels are used in digesters to convert wood chips into wood pulp. 6% Mo superaustenitics are used in the bleach plant and Type 316 is used extensively in the paper machine.

== Chemical and petrochemical processing ==
Stainless steels are used extensively in the chemical and petrochemical industries for their corrosion resistance to aqueous, gaseous, and high-temperature environments, their mechanical properties at all temperatures, and occasionally for other special physical properties.

== Food and beverage ==
Austenitic (300 series) stainless steel, particularly Types 304 and 316, is the material of choice for the food and beverage industry, though martensitic and ferritic (400 series) steels are also used. Stainless steels are advantageous because they do not affect the taste of the product, are easily cleaned and sterilized to prevent bacterial contamination of the food, and are durable. Within the food and beverage industry, stainless steel is extensively used in cookware, commercial food processing, commercial kitchens, brewing beer, winemaking, and meat processing.

Stainless steel's superiority over plastic in preserving flavor is reportedly why McDonald's traditionally procures soft drink syrup for its soda fountains from The Coca-Cola Company in stainless steel tanks, rather than the bag-in-box technology preferred by most fast food restaurant chains.

Acidic foods with high salt additions, such as tomato sauce, and highly salted condiments, such as soy sauce, may require higher-alloyed stainless steels such as 6% Mo superaustenitics to prevent pitting corrosion by chloride.

== Vehicles ==
=== Automobiles ===
The Allegheny Ludlum Corporation worked with Ford on various concept cars with stainless steel bodies from the 1930s through the 1970s to demonstrate the material's potential. The 1957 and 1958 Cadillac Eldorado Brougham has a stainless steel roof. In 1981 and 1982, the DMC DeLorean production automobile used Type 304 stainless steel body panels over a glass-reinforced plastic monocoque. Intercity buses made by Motor Coach Industries are partially made of stainless steel. The aft body panel of the Porsche Cayman model (2-door coupe hatchback) is made of stainless steel. Due to the Cayman's many curves and angles, it was discovered during early body prototyping that conventional steel could not be formed without cracking. Thus, Porsche was forced to use stainless steel. The body of the Tesla Cybertruck, which went into production in 2023, is composed of 300-series stainless steel.

The largest use of stainless steel in cars is the exhaust line. Environment protection requirements aimed at reducing pollution and noise for the entirety of a car's lifespan led to the use of ferritic stainless steels (typically AISI409/409Cb in North America, EN1.4511 and 1.4512 in Europe). They are used for collector, tubing, muffler, catalytic converter, tailpipe. Heat-resisting grades EN1.4913 or 1.4923 are used in parts of turbochargers, while other heat-resisting grades are used for exhaust gas recirculation and for inlet and exhaust valves. In addition, common rail injection systems and their injectors rely on stainless steels.

Stainless steel is often preferred to process miscellaneous applications, such as stiffeners for windshield wiper blades, balls for seat belt operation device in case of accident, springs, fasteners, etc.

Some automotive manufacturers use stainless steel as decorative highlights in their vehicles.

=== Light commuter trains ===
Stainless steel is now used as one of the materials for tramlinks, together with aluminium alloys and carbon steel. Duplex grades tend to be preferred thanks to their corrosion resistance and higher strength, allowing a reduction of weight and a long life in maritime environments.

=== Passenger rail cars ===
Rail cars have commonly been manufactured using corrugated stainless steel panels for additional structural strength. This was particularly popular during the 1960s and 1970s but has since declined. One notable example was the early Pioneer Zephyr. Notable former manufacturers of stainless steel rolling stock included the Budd Company (USA), which has been licensed to Japan's Tokyu Car Corporation, and the Portuguese company Sorefame. Many railcars in the United States are still manufactured with stainless steel. In India, where rail infrastructure is developing, new stainless steel coaches in being put into service. South Africa is also commissioning stainless steel coaches.

=== Aircraft ===
Budd also built two airplanes, the Budd BB-1 Pioneer and the Budd RB-1 Conestoga, out of stainless steel tube and sheet. The first, which had fabric wing coverings, is on display at the Franklin Institute, being the longest continuous display of an aircraft ever, since 1934. The RB-2 was almost all stainless steel, save for the control surfaces. One survives at the Pima Air & Space Museum, adjacent to Davis–Monthan Air Force Base.

The American Fleetwings Sea Bird amphibious aircraft of 1936 was also built using a spot-welded stainless steel hull.

Due to its thermal stability, the Bristol Aeroplane Company built the all-stainless steel Bristol 188 high-speed research aircraft, which first flew in 1963. However, the practical problems encountered meant that later high-speed aircraft, such as the Concorde, employed aluminium alloys. The experimental Mach 3 American bomber, the XB70 Valkyrie, made extensive use of stainless steel in its external structure due to the extreme heat encountered at those high speeds.

The Mikoyan-Gurevich MiG-25 interceptor aircraft was built predominantly out of stainless steel due to the Soviet Union's inability to mass-produce an aircraft made from lightweight titanium, the only other way found to protect from the extreme kinetic heating. It severely hindered the aircraft's flight performance and the MiG-25 had to be kept extremely secret to prevent the NATO allies from finding out about the realities of the aircraft's performance. It however holds the world altitude record for aircraft, at ~123,000 feet.

The use of stainless steel in mainstream aircraft is hindered by its excessive weight compared to other materials, such as aluminium.

=== Spacecraft ===
Stainless steel (SS) also has an application in spaceflight. The early Atlas rockets used stainless steel in their fuel tanks. The tank structure of the Centaur upper stage of the Atlas V and Vulcan Centaur launchers uses SS.

The outer cladding of the modules and the Integrated Truss Structure of the International Space Station use stainless steel alloys.

Components of the Space Launch System use SS..

Both stages of SpaceX Starship are largely made of type 300 SS.

== Medicine ==
Surgical tools and medical equipment are usually made of stainless steel, because of its durability and ability to be sterilized in an autoclave. In addition, surgical implants such as bone reinforcements and replacements (e.g. hip sockets and cranial plates) are made with special alloys formulated to resist corrosion, mechanical wear, and biological reactions in vivo.

Stainless steel is used in a variety of applications in dentistry. It is common to use stainless steel in many instruments that need to be sterilized, such as needles, endodontic files in root canal therapy, metal posts in root canal-treated teeth, temporary crowns and crowns for deciduous teeth, and arch wires and brackets in orthodontics. Surgical stainless steel alloys (e.g., 316 low-carbon steel) were also used in some early dental implants.

== Energy ==
Stainless steels are extensively used in all types of power stations, from nuclear to solar. Stainless steels are ideally suited as mechanical supports for power generation units when the permeation of gases or liquids are required, such as filters in cooling water or hot gas clean up or as structural supports in electrolytic power generation.

Stainless steel is used in electrolysers (proton exchange membranes and solid oxide electrolysers being the most common) that convert electrical energy into hydrogen gas by water electrolysis. Conversely, stainless steel is used in fuel cells which perform the opposite reaction, combining hydrogen and oxygen to produce water and electrical energy.

== Culinary ==
Stainless steel is often preferred for kitchen sinks because of its ruggedness, durability, heat resistance, and ease of cleaning. In better models, acoustic noise is controlled by applying resilient undercoating to dampen vibrations. The material is also used for cladding of surfaces such as appliances and backsplashes.

Cookware and bakeware may be clad in stainless steels to enhance their cleanability and durability and to permit their use in induction cooking (this requires a magnetic grade of stainless steel, such as 432). Because stainless steel is a poor conductor of heat, it is often used as a thin surface cladding over a core of copper or aluminium, which conducts heat more readily.

Cutlery is often made of stainless steel, for low corrosion, ease of cleaning, negligible toxicity, and ability to avoid flavoring the food by electrolytic activity.

== Jewelry ==
Stainless steel is used for jewelry and watches, with 316L being the type commonly used. Oxidizing stainless steel briefly gives it radiant colors that can also be used for coloration effects.

== Firearms ==
Some firearms incorporate stainless steel components as an alternative to blued or parkerized steel. Some handgun models, such as the Smith & Wesson Model 60 and the Colt M1911 pistol, can be made entirely from stainless steel. This gives a high-luster finish similar in appearance to nickel plating. Unlike plating, the finish is not subject to flaking, peeling, wear-off from rubbing (as when repeatedly removed from a holster), or rust when scratched.

== 3D printing ==
Some 3D printing providers have developed proprietary stainless steel sintering blends for use in rapid prototyping. One popular stainless steel grade used in 3D printing is 316L stainless steel. Due to the high temperature gradient and fast rate of solidification, stainless steel products manufactured via 3D printing tend to have a more refined microstructure; this, in turn, results in better mechanical properties. However, stainless steel is not as commonly used as materials like Ti_{6}Al_{4}V, due to the availability of more cost-effective traditional manufacturing methods for stainless steel.
