= Fiddler's Green Amphitheatre =

Concert venue in Colorado, United States

Coordinates: 39°36′01.77″N 104°53′38.26″W

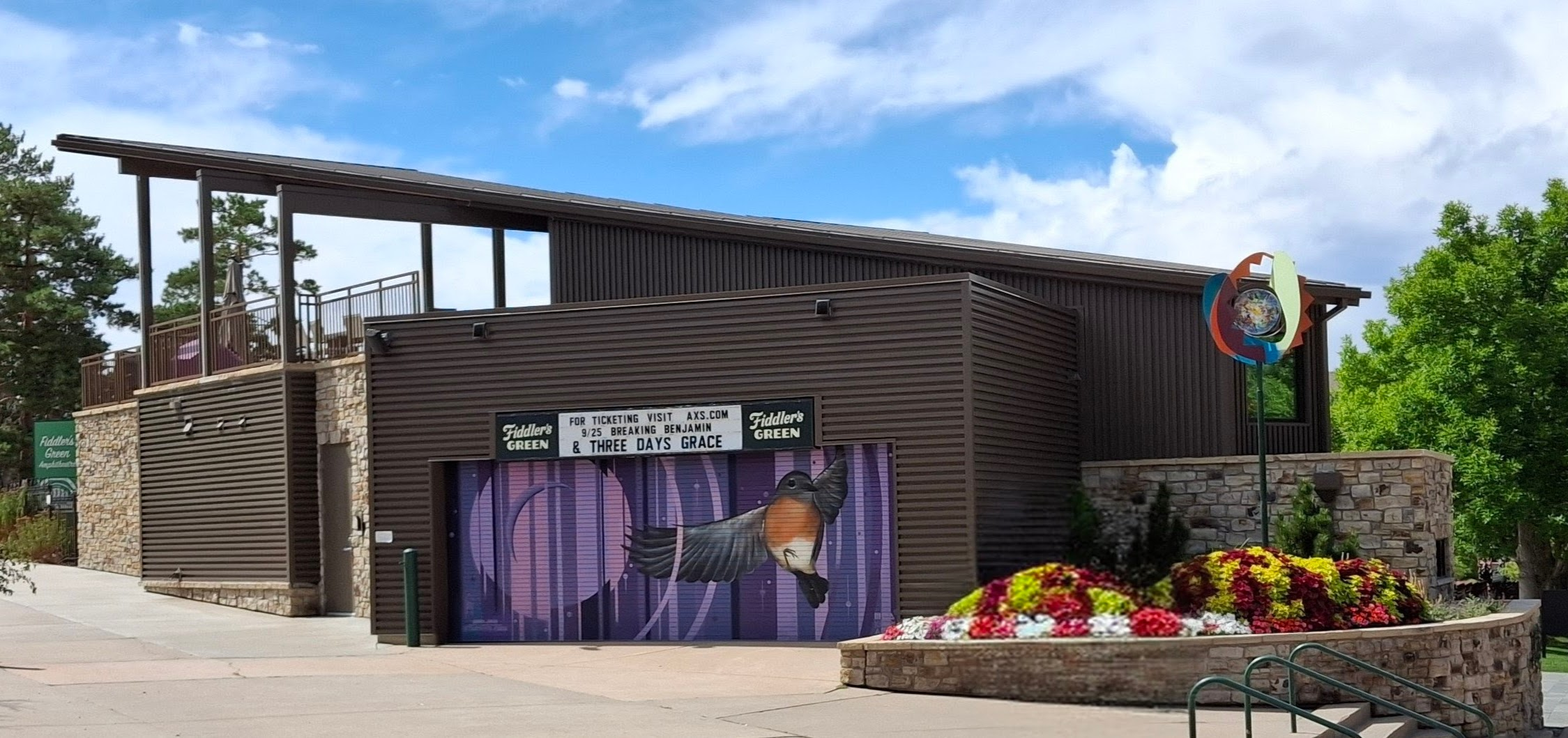
- Box office at Fiddler's Green Amphitheatre
- Interactive map of Fiddler's Green Amphitheatre
- Former names: Fiddler's Green Amphitheatre (1988–2004, 2009–2010, 2013–present); Coors Amphitheatre (2004–2009); Comfort Dental Amphitheatre (2010–2013)
- Address: 6350 Greenwood Plaza Blvd; Greenwood Village, Colorado 80111-4930
- Location: Denver Metro
- Owner: Museum of Outdoor Arts
- Operator: AEG Live
- Capacity: 18,000
- Type: Amphitheatre

Construction
- Opened: June 11, 1988
- Renovated: 2013–2014

Website
- fiddlersgreenamp.com

Fiddler's Green Amphitheatre (formerly Comfort Dental Amphitheatre and Coors Amphitheatre) is an 18,000-person capacity amphitheatre located in Greenwood Village, Colorado, United States. It is the largest outdoor amphitheatre in the Denver metropolitan area and is generally open every year from May to September.

== About ==
It features 7,500 fixed seats and a general admission lawn section. The amphitheatre is nestled in Greenwood Plaza near the Denver Technological Center amongst office buildings. It opened in 1988 under the original name of Fiddler's Green Amphitheatre with a performance by Dan Fogelberg on June 11, 1988. In March 2004, it was announced the amphitheatre would open the 2004 season with a new name, Coors Amphitheatre. The amphitheatre reclaimed its original name in 2009 when Coors sponsorship agreement with concert promoter Live Nation was not renewed, and Coors lost their naming rights. Starting February 2010, health organization Comfort Dental gained sponsorship rights for three years, changing its name to the Comfort Dental Amphitheatre. The contract expired on January 31, 2013, and was not renewed. Beginning February 2013, the venue is, once again, known by its original name. In October 2013, the venue's operations contract expired with Live Nation, with the entertainment company choosing not to renew. Its owner, The Museum of Outdoor Arts (MOA) signed a 15-year operations agreement with local promoter, AEG Live Rocky Mountains. The partnership will include a $5 million renovation, to take place during the amphitheatre's off season.

=== Museum of Outdoor Arts ===
The Museum of Outdoor Arts, a local non-profit, owns Fiddler's Green Amphitheatre, having commissioned for it to be built. The amphitheatre began as an earth sculpture (made up only of earth and grass) where local business people could break for a lunchtime concert series sponsored by Museum of Outdoor Arts. Later, walls and seats were installed to make it the venue it is today. MOA has leased the venue out to large promoters such as MCA Concerts, House of Blues and Live Nation.

Also owned by MOA is Marjorie Park, which is connected to the amphitheatre. Marjorie Park features outdoor sculptures owned by Museum of Outdoor Arts, including its famous bronze series of Alice in Wonderland by artist Harry Marinsky, Stickworks by internationally renowned artist Patrick Dougherty, kinetic sculpture Estacas by Ken Bortolazzo, African sculpture by Agnes Nyanhongo and also features seasonal installations by renowned Colorado-based artist Lonnie Hanzon.

== Events ==
List of events held at the Amphitheatre
Artist	Event	Date	Opening Act(s)
311	Summer Unity Tour	August 29, 2003	G. Love & Special Sauce & Something Corporate
Blondie & Garbage	Rage and Rapture Tour	July 16, 2017	John Doe & Exene Cervenka
78violet	NextFest Tour	July 19, 2007	Drake Bell, Corbin Bleu & Bianca Ryan
A-Teens	Pop 'til You Drop! Tour	August 30, 2002	Baha Men, Prymary Colorz & LMNT
Aerosmith	Get a Grip Tour	July 26, 1993	Jackyl
Aerosmith	Get a Grip Tour	July 27, 1993	Jackyl
Aerosmith	Nine Lives Tour	May 1, 1999	The Afghan Whigs
Aerosmith	Just Push Play Tour	July 23, 2001	Fuel
Aerosmith	A–Z Tour	August 1, 2009	ZZ Top
Alice in Chains	2007 Tour	September 24, 2007	Velvet Revolver & Sparta
America	1988 Tour	July 4, 1988	Flash Cadillac
America's Most Wanted Music Festival		August 23, 2013	
American Idol Live!	American Idols LIVE! Tour 2010	August 23, 2010	
Anger Management Tour		August 22, 2002	
Ashlee Simpson	L.O.V.E. Tour	June 13, 2006	Ashley Parker Angel
B.B. King	Lucille & Friends Tour	August 15, 1995	
B.B. King	Blues on the Bayou Tour	August 18, 1998	
B.B. King	Let the Good Times Roll Tour	August 17, 1999	
B.B. King	Makin' Love Is Good for You Tour	August 15, 2000	
B.B. King	2001 Tour	August 14, 2001	
B.B. King	2002 Tour	August 13, 2002	
B.B. King	Reflections Tour	August 7, 2003	
B.B. King	B. B. King & Friends: 80 Tour	August 16, 2005	
Back in the Day...Freestyle Old School Explosion Concert		August 15, 2008	
Backstreet Boys	Backstreet's Back Tour	August 4, 1998	Aaron Carter
Barenaked Ladies	Stunt Tour	August 25, 1999	The Beautiful South
Barry Manilow	Swing Street Tour	July 22, 1988	
Barry Manilow	Singin' with the Big Bands Tour	June 3, 1994	
Barry Manilow	Manilow Sings Sinatra Tour	September 7, 1999	
The Beach Boys	1988 Tour	July 16, 1988	
The Beach Boys	Still Cruisin' Tour	June 1, 1989	Chicago
The Beach Boys	1998 Tour	June 21, 1998	
The Beach Boys	1998 Tour	June 22, 1998	
The Black Crowes & Lenny Kravitz	By Your Side Tour	April 29, 1999	
The Black Crowes & Oasis	The Tour of Brotherly Love	May 21, 2001	Spacehog
Blink-182	The Mark, Tom and Travis Show Tour	June 29, 2000	Bad Religion & Fenix TX
Blink-182	Take Off Your Pants and Jacket Tour	August 11, 2001	New Found Glory & Midtown
Blink-182	Blink-182 Tour	May 1, 2004	Cypress Hill & Taking Back Sunday
Blink-182	Blink-182 in Concert	September 6, 2009	Weezer, Taking Back Sunday & Chester French
Bob Dylan	Never Ending Tour 1988	June 15, 1988	
Bob Dylan	Never Ending Tour 1989	August 31, 1989	Steve Earle
Bob Dylan	Never Ending Tour 1993	August 25, 1993	Santana
Bob Dylan	Americanarama Festival of Music Tour	July 31, 2013	Wilco, My Morning Jacket & Ryan Bingham
Bon Jovi	New Jersey Syndicate Tour	July 28, 1989	Skid Row
Boston	Livin' For You Tour	July 26, 1995	
Boston & The Doobie Brothers	2014 Tour	August 6, 2014	Pat Simmons Jr.
Brad Paisley & The Drama Kings	American Saturday Night Tour	September 18, 2009	Dierks Bentley & Jimmy Wayne
Brad Paisley & The Drama Kings	H2O Tour	September 25, 2010	Darius Rucker, Justin Moore, Josh Thompson, Easton Corbin & Steel Magnolia
Brad Paisley & The Drama Kings	Beat This Summer Tour	August 1, 2013	Chris Young & Lee Brice
Brooks & Dunn	Neon Circus & Wild West Show Tour	May 12, 2002	Gary Allan, Chris Cagle, Dwight Yoakam & Trick Pony
Bruno Mars & The Hooligans	The Moonshine Jungle Tour	August 17, 2014	Nico & Vinz
Bryan Adams	Waking Up the Neighbours Tour	May 5, 1992	
Bush	Razorblade Suitcase Tour	May 27, 1997	Veruca Salt & Souls
Charlie Daniels Band	Volunteer Jam Tour	May 24, 2014	Outlaws, BlackHawk & Craig Campbell
Cher	Heart of Stone Tour	June 9, 1990	
Chicago	1998 Tour	July 28, 1998	Hall & Oates
Chicago & Earth, Wind & Fire	2009 Tour	July 14, 2009	
Chuck Berry	2001 Tour	August 18, 2001	
Colorado Symphony	The Sounds of America Concert	July 4, 2009	
Colorado Symphony	The Music of Led Zeppelin Concert	June 8, 2014	
Colorado Symphony	Independence Day Strikes Back Concert	July 4, 2014	
Counting Crows	Hard Candy Tour	July 7, 2003	John Mayer
Counting Crows	Saturday Nights & Sunday Mornings Tour	September 24, 2008	Maroon 5 & Augustana
Country Throwdown Tour		June 13, 2010	
Creed	Full Circle Reunion Tour	October 3, 2009	Staind & Like a Storm
Crosby, Stills & Nash	American Dream Tour	August 29, 1988	
Crosby, Stills & Nash	2003 Tour	June 13, 2003	
Crüe Fest	Crüe Fest	July 27, 2008	
Crüe Fest	Crüe Fest 2	August 4, 2009	
The Cure	Prayer Tour	September 4, 1989	Pixies, Love and Rockets & Shelleyan Orphan
The Cure	Dream Tour	June 5, 2000	
Curiosa Festival		August 17, 2004	
Dan Fogelberg	Exiles Tour	June 11, 1988	Magical Strings
David Lee Roth	DLR Band Tour	July 22, 1999	Bad Company
Deep Purple	Abandon Tour	August 26, 1996	Emerson, Lake & Palmer & Dream Theater
Def Leppard	Seven Day Weekend Tour	July 14, 1993	
Def Leppard	Slang World Tour	August 23, 1996	Tripping Daisy
Def Leppard	Downstage Thrust Tour	September 9, 2007	Styx & Foreigner
Def Leppard	Songs from the Sparkle Lounge Tour	August 24, 2009	Poison & Cheap Trick
Def Leppard	Mirrorball Tour	August 29, 2011	Heart
Depeche Mode	Exciter Tour	July 21, 2001	Poe
Devo	2005 Tour	August 23, 2005	Dramarama & The English Beat
Diana Krall	The Girl in the Other Room Tour	July 13, 2004	
The Doobie Brothers	1996 Tour	May 22, 1996	
The Doobie Brothers	2010 Tour	June 23, 2010	Chicago
Drake	Club Paradise Tour	May 13, 2012	J. Cole, Waka Flocka Flame, Meek Mill, 2 Chainz & French Montana
Duran Duran	Dilate Your Mind Tour	August 20, 1993	Terence Trent D'Arby
Eagles	Hell Freezes Over Reunion Tour	June 14, 1994	
Eagles	Hell Freezes Over Reunion Tour	June 15, 1994	
Eagles	Hell Freezes Over Reunion Tour	June 16, 1994	
Elton John	Reg Strikes Back Tour	September 20, 1988	
Elton John	Sleeping with the Past Tour	August 22, 1989	
Elton John	The One Tour	September 2, 1992	
Elton John	Duets Tour	September 13, 1994	
Elton John	Big Picture Tour	August 24, 1998	
Elvis Costello	Spike Tour	September 6, 1989	Rude 5
Eric Clapton	1988 Tour	September 19, 1988	Buckwheat Zydeco
Family Values Tour	Family Values Tour 2006	August 15, 2006	
Family Values Tour	Family Values Tour 2007	August 24, 2007	
Fleetwood Mac	Say You Will Tour	July 11, 2004	
Foreigner	25th Anniversary Tour	June 26, 2002	Bad Company & Joe Bonamassa
Foreigner & Styx	The Soundtrack of Summer Tour	July 22, 2014	Don Felder
Furthur Festival		July 20, 1996	
Furthur Festival		July 27, 1997	
Furthur Festival		July 19, 1998	
Furthur Festival		August 29, 2000	
George Michael	Faith World Tour	September 17, 1988	
George Michael	Faith World Tour	September 18, 1988	
Gigantour		September 16, 2006	
Gipsy Kings	1999 Tour	June 13, 1999	
Gipsy Kings	1999 Tour	June 13, 1999	
Gloria Estefan	Evolution Tour	August 20, 1996	
Goo Goo Dolls	Levi's Fuse Tour	July 28, 1999	Sugar Ray & Fastball
Goo Goo Dolls & Matchbox 20	2013 Summer Tour	July 15, 2013	Kate Earl
Green Day & Blink-182	Pop Disaster Tour	May 4, 2002	Jimmy Eat World
Green Day	21st Century Breakdown World Tour	August 28, 2010	AFI
Guns N' Roses	Use Your Illusion Tour	July 12, 1991	Skid Row
H.O.R.D.E. Festival		August 7, 1994	
H.O.R.D.E. Festival		July 20, 1997	
Heart	Brigade Tour	August 22, 1990	The Black Crowes
Heart	Heartbreaker Tour	August 20, 2013	Jason Bonham's Led Zeppelin Experience
Heaven & Hell	2007 North American Tour	September 25, 2007	Alice Cooper & Queensrÿche
Hilary Duff	Still Most Wanted Tour	July 16, 2005	
Hilary Duff	Dignity Tour	August 21, 2007	
HippieFest		July 18, 2007	
Honda Civic Tour	6th Annual Honda Civic Tour	May 11, 2007	
Honda Civic Tour	10th Annual Honda Civic Tour	September 4, 2011	
Honda Civic Tour	11th Annual Honda Civic Tour	August 30, 2012	
Honda Civic Tour	12th Annual Honda Civic Tour	September 24, 2013	
Hootie & the Blowfish	Musical Chairs Tour	August 18, 1999	Glenn Frey
Howard Jones	Cross That Line Tour	June 30, 1989	Midge Ure
Huey Lewis and the News	Small World Tour	September 10, 1988	
Intocable	2006 Tour	May 20, 2006	Kumbia Kings
INXS	Kick Tour	June 12, 1988	Public Image Ltd & Steel Pulse
Iron Maiden	The Ed Hunter Tour	July 27, 1999	Monster Magnet, Soulfly & Puya
Iron Maiden	Give Me Ed... 'Til I'm Dead Tour	August 20, 2003	Dio & Motörhead
Iron Maiden	The Final Frontier World Tour	June 14, 2010	Dream Theater
Iron Maiden	Maiden England World Tour	August 13, 2012	Coheed and Cambria
Jackson Browne	The Naked Ride Home Tour	August 3, 2003	Steve Earle & Keb' Mo'
James Taylor	1994 Tour	July 10, 1994	
James Taylor	Hourglass Tour	July 24, 1998	
James Taylor	2005 Tour	August 19, 2005	
Jammin' Family Reunion Concert		September 16, 2005	
Janet Jackson	Janet World Tour	August 5, 1994	
JAY Z	Vol. 2... Hard Knock Life Tour	April 27, 1999	DMX and Method Man & Redman
JAY Z & 50 Cent	Rock the Mic Tour	July 22, 2003	Busta Rhymes, Fabolous & Chingy
Jefferson Starship	2000 Tour	June 17, 2000	Eric Burdon & The New Animals
Jerry Lee Lewis	2000 Tour	June 18, 2000	
Jethro Tull	25th Anniversary Tour	September 14, 1993	
Jimmy Buffett & The Coral Reefer Band	Hot Water Tour	July 30, 1988	
Jimmy Buffett & The Coral Reefer Band	Hot Water Tour	July 31, 1988	
Jimmy Buffett & The Coral Reefer Band	Off to See the Lizard Tour	June 17, 1989	The Neville Brothers
Jimmy Buffett & The Coral Reefer Band	Off to See the Lizard Tour	June 18, 1989	The Neville Brothers
Jimmy Buffett & The Coral Reefer Band	Jimmy's Jump Up Tour	June 26, 1990	Little Feat & Zachary Richard
Jimmy Buffett & The Coral Reefer Band	Jimmy's Jump Up Tour	June 27, 1990	Little Feat & Zachary Richard
Jimmy Buffett & The Coral Reefer Band	Outposts Tour	June 18, 1991	Greg "Fingers" Taylor & The Ladyfingers Revue
Jimmy Buffett & The Coral Reefer Band	Outposts Tour	June 19, 1991	Greg "Fingers" Taylor & The Ladyfingers Revue
Jimmy Buffett & The Coral Reefer Band	Recession Recess Tour	August 18, 1992	Evangeline
Jimmy Buffett & The Coral Reefer Band	Recession Recess Tour	August 19, 1992	Evangeline
Jimmy Buffett & The Coral Reefer Band	Chameleon Caravan Tour	June 8, 1993	The Iguanas
Jimmy Buffett & The Coral Reefer Band	Chameleon Caravan Tour	June 9, 1993	The Iguanas
Jimmy Buffett & The Coral Reefer Band	Fruitcakes Tour	September 26, 1994	
Jimmy Buffett & The Coral Reefer Band	Fruitcakes Tour	September 27, 1994	
Jimmy Buffett & The Coral Reefer Band	Banana Wind Tour	October 1, 1996	
Jimmy Buffett & The Coral Reefer Band	Banana Wind Tour	October 2, 1996	
Jimmy Buffett & The Coral Reefer Band	Don't Stop the Carnival Tour	September 26, 1998	
Jimmy Buffett & The Coral Reefer Band	A Beach Odyssey Tour	May 31, 2001	
John Denver	Higher Ground Tour	July 2, 1988	
John Denver	Earth Songs Tour	May 26, 1990	
John Denver	The Flower That Shattered the Stone Tour	September 26, 1990	
John Denver	Different Directions Tour	July 19, 1992	
John Denver	1995 Tour	July 17, 1995	
John Lee Hooker	1992 Tour	September 13, 1992	
John Mellencamp	Cuttin' Heads Tour	July 30, 2002	
Jonas Brothers	Burnin' Up Tour	July 19, 2008	Demi Lovato
Journey	Revelation Tour	July 9, 2008	Cheap Trick & Heart
Journey	Eclipse Tour	October 1, 2011	Foreigner & Night Ranger
Judas Priest	Angel of Retribution Tour	June 29, 2005	Queensrÿche
KBPI 106.7	Locura Festival	September 2, 2013	
KC's Boogie Blast		August 1, 2006	
Keith Urban	Raise'Em Up Tour	August 29, 2014	Jerrod Niemann & Brett Eldredge
Kenny Rogers	Back to the Well Tour	July 7, 2004	
Kid Rock & Twisted Brown Trucker
Kid Rock & Twisted Brown Trucker	Devil Without a Cause Tour	September 17, 1999	Limp Bizkit
Kid Rock & Twisted Brown Trucker	Rock 'n' Roll Pain Train Tour	May 15, 2004	Puddle of Mudd
Kid Rock & Twisted Brown Trucker	$20 Best Night Ever Tour	August 3, 2013	ZZ Top & Uncle Kracker
Kids Benefit Concert		June 6, 2008	
Kings of Leon	Come Around Sundown World Tour	July 20, 2010	Built to Spill & The Features
KISS	Kiss Farewell Tour	August 14, 2000	Ted Nugent & Skid Row
Kiss & Aerosmith	AeroKiss Tour	September 30, 2003	Saliva
Kiss	Rock the Nation Tour	June 15, 2004	Poison & ZO2
Kiss & Mötley Crüe	The Tour	August 8, 2012	The Treatment
KMXY 104.3	Smooth Jazz Festival	June 24, 2006	
KMXY 104.3	Smooth Jazz Festival	June 23, 2007	
Kool Koncerts		June 20, 1998	
Kool Koncerts		June 15, 2002	
Kool Koncerts		July 2, 2005	
Kool Koncerts		June 15, 2007	
Kool Koncerts		June 16, 2007	
Kool Koncerts		June 11, 2008	
Kool Koncerts		July 22, 2008	
Kool Koncerts		August 12, 2012	
Kool Koncerts		August 9, 2014	
KPTT 95.7	Mad Decent Block Party	August 22, 2014	
KQKS KS107.5	Back 2 Skool Jam	October 2, 2006	
KQKS KS107.5	Back 2 Skool Jam	August 29, 2007	
KQKS KS107.5	Back 2 Skool Jam	August 20, 2009	
KQKS KS107.5	KS All Star Jam	September 7, 2013	
KQKS KS107.5	KS All Star Jam	August 30, 2014	
KQKS KS107.5	KS Classics Jam	August 24, 2012	
KQKS KS107.5	Summer Jam	June 11, 2005	
KQKS KS107.5	Summer Jam	June 10, 2006	
KQKS KS107.5	Summer Jam	June 9, 2007	
KQKS KS107.5	Summer Jam	June 13, 2008	
KQKS KS107.5	Summer Jam	June 12, 2009	
KQKS KS107.5	Summer Jam	June 11, 2010	
KQKS KS107.5	Summer Jam	June 10, 2011	
KQKS KS107.5	Summer Jam	June 8, 2012	
KQKS KS107.5	Summer Jam	June 7, 2013	
KQKS KS107.5	Summer Jam	June 6, 2014	
KTCL 93.3	Big Adventure Concert	June 3, 1995	
KTCL 93.3	Big Adventure Concert	June 22, 1996	
KTCL 93.3	Big Adventure Concert	June 28, 1997	
KTCL 93.3	Big Adventure Concert	May 30, 1998	
KTCL 93.3	Big Adventure Concert	June 3, 2000	
KTCL 93.3	Big Gig Concert	August 11, 2007	
KTCL 93.3	Big Gig Concert	July 26, 2008	
KTCL 93.3	Big Gig Concert	July 11, 2009	
KTCL 93.3	Big Gig Concert	September 18, 2010	
KTCL 93.3	Big Gig Concert	July 19, 2014	
KYGO 98.5	Guys Night Out Concert	June 23, 2006	
KYGO 98.5	My Country Concert	August 2, 2008	
KYGO 98.5	30th Anniversary Concert	July 31, 2010	
Lauryn Hill	Miseducation Tour	July 3, 1999	The Roots
Lenny Kravitz	Lenny Tour	August 21, 2002	
Lil Wayne	I Am Music II Tour	August 30, 2011	Keri Hilson, Rick Ross, Porcelain Black, Lloyd & Far East Movement
Lilith Fair		August 23, 1998	
Lilith Fair		August 28, 1999	
Lilith Fair		August 29, 1999	
Lilith Fair		July 13, 2010	
Linkin Park & 30 Seconds to Mars	Carnivores Tour	September 8, 2014	AFI
Little Feat	Let It Roll Tour	July 30, 1988	
Little Feat	1989 Tour	August 29, 1989	
Little Feat	Representing the Mambo Tour	September 7, 1990	
Little Feat	Shake Me Up Tour	August 24, 1992	
Live	The Distance to Here Tour	October 5, 2000	Counting Crows & Bettie Serveert
Lollapalooza		August 25, 1991	
Lollapalooza		July 25, 1992	
Lollapalooza		June 26, 1993	
Lollapalooza		July 9, 1994	
Lollapalooza		July 8, 1995	
Lollapalooza		August 10, 1997	
Lollapalooza		August 13, 2003	
Lost 80's Concert		August 23, 2005	
Luke Bryan	Dirt Road Diaries Tour	September 21, 2013	Thompson Square & Florida Georgia Line
Lynyrd Skynyrd	The Last Rebel Tour	May 22, 1996	The Doobie Brothers
Lynyrd Skynyrd	Lynyrd Skynyrd Twenty Tour	August 19, 1997	Kenny Wayne Shepherd & Paul Rodgers
Lynyrd Skynyrd	Lynyrd Skynyrd 2016 North American Tour	August 9, 2016	Peter Frampton
Lynyrd Skynyrd	The Last of the Street Survivors Farewell Tour	September 21, 2019	Bad Company & The Steel Woods
Lynyrd Skynyrd & ZZ Top	Sharp Dressed Simple Man Tour	August 7, 2023	Uncle Kracker
Matchbox 20	Mad Season Tour	September 18, 2001	Train & Pete Yorn
Marilyn Manson	Rape of the World Tour	August 18, 2007	Slayer & Bleeding Through
Mayhem Festival		July 20, 2008	
Mayhem Festival		July 19, 2009	
Mayhem Festival		July 18, 2010	
Mayhem Festival		July 17, 2011	
Mayhem Festival		July 8, 2012	
Mayhem Festival		July 7, 2013	
Meat Loaf & His Neverland Express	Everything Louder Tour	August 16, 1994	Cheap Trick
Metallica	Shit Hits the Sheds Tour	August 3, 1994	Candlebox & Suicidal Tendencies
Metallica	Poor Re-Touring Me Tour	September 8, 1998	Days of the New & Jerry Cantrell
Michael W. Smith	2004 Tour	August 10, 2004	David Crowder Band & MercyMe
Miranda Lambert & Dierks Bentley	Locked & Reloaded Tour	May 18, 2013	Randy Houser & Joanna Smith
The Monkees	1989 Tour	July 4, 1989	
The Moody Blues	Sur la Mer Tour	September 2, 1988	
The Moody Blues	1990 Tour	September 5, 1990	Big Head Todd and the Monsters
The Moody Blues	1997 Tour	May 28, 1997	
Mt. Joy	Hope We Have Fun Tour	August 15, 2025	The Brook & The Bluff
Mt. Joy	World Tour 2026	August 15, 2026	Arcy Drive
Neil Young	Harvest Moon Tour	September 1, 1993	Booker T. & the M.G.'s
Neil Young & Crazy Horse	Broken Arrow Tour	September 9, 1996	
The New Cars	Roadrage Tour	May 30, 2006	Blondie
New Kids on the Block	Full Service Tour	July 15, 2009	Jabbawockeez
Nickelback	All the Right Reasons Tour	August 9, 2006	Hoobastank & Chevelle
Nickelback	Dark Horse Tour	August 25, 2009	Hinder, Papa Roach & Saving Abel
Nine Inch Nails & Jane's Addiction	NIN/JA Tour	May 26, 2009	Street Sweeper Social Club
No Doubt	2009 Summer Tour	May 27, 2009	Paramore & The Sounds
The Offspring	Americana Tour	May 17, 1999	The Mighty Mighty Bosstones & The Living End
The Offspring	Summer Nationals Tour	August 24, 2014	Bad Religion, Pennywise & Stiff Little Fingers
Ozzfest		July 24, 2004	Magna-Fi
Ozzfest		August 17, 2005	
Ozzfest		July 28, 2007	
Page & Plant	No Quarter Tour	September 30, 1995	The Tragically Hip
Paul Simon	You're the One Tour	June 24, 2001	Brian Wilson
Pearl Jam	Yield Tour	June 23, 1998	Frank Black & The Catholics
Peter Gabriel	Secret World Live Tour	September 16, 1993	
Phil Collins	Both Sides of the World Tour	July 27, 1994	
Phish	Farmhouse Tour	September 27, 2000	
Pitbull & Ke$ha	2013 North American Tour	June 11, 2013	Justice Crew & Jump Smokers!
Poison	Native Tongue Tour	July 5, 1993	Damn Yankees
Poison	Power to the People Tour	August 17, 2000	Dokken, Cinderella & Slaughter
Poison	Hollywierd World Tour	June 12, 2002	Cinderella, Winger & Faster Pussycat
Poison	20th Anniversary Tour	July 12, 2006	Cinderella & Endeverafter
Poison	Poison'd! Summer Tour	August 19, 2007	Ratt & Vains of Jenna
Poison	Live, Raw & Uncut Tour	September 6, 2008	Dokken & Sebastian Bach Band
The Pretenders	Last of the Independents Tour	July 30, 1998	The B-52's
Pride & Glory	Pride & Glory Tour	August 2, 1994	
Prince & The New Power Generation	Jam of the Year Tour	October 5, 1997	Chaka Khan
Projekt Revolution		August 30, 2004	
Projekt Revolution		September 3, 2007	
Projekt Revolution		August 12, 2008	
R.E.M.	Monster Tour	May 24, 1995	Sonic Youth
R.E.M.	Monster Tour	May 25, 1995	Sonic Youth
Rage Against the Machine	Evil Empire Tour	September 8, 1997	Wu-Tang Clan & Atari Teenage Riot
Rascal Flatts	Me and My Gang Tour	July 25, 2006	Blake Shelton & Eric Church
Rascal Flatts	Flatts Fest Tour	September 10, 2011	Sara Evans & Justin Moore
Rascal Flatts	Changed Tour	September 8, 2012	Little Big Town, Eli Young Band & Edens Edge
Rascal Flatts	Rewind Tour	July 16, 2014	Gloriana & Frankie Ballard
Ray Charles	Strong Love Affair Tour	September 7, 1997	
Red Hot Chili Peppers	Californication Tour	September 16, 2000	Stone Temple Pilots
Red Hot Chili Peppers	By the Way World Tour	June 20, 2003	Snoop Dogg & Rose Hill Drive
REO Speedwagon	Classic Rock's Main Event Tour	May 30, 2003	Journey & Styx
REO Speedwagon	2006 Tour	October 1, 2006	Styx & The Fabulous Thunderbirds
Ricardo Arjona	Adentro Tour	August 6, 2006	
Rick Springfield	1998 Tour	August 1, 1998	Joe Cocker & The Fixx
Ringo Starr & His All-Starr Band	1992 Tour	September 1, 1992	
Ringo Starr & His All-Starr Band	1997 Tour	May 7, 1997	
Rita Coolidge	2002 Tour	August 11, 2002	
Rock the Bells Festival		August 23, 2008	
Rock Never Stops Tour		August 5, 2003	
Rod Stewart	Out of Order Tour	July 29, 1988	
Rod Stewart	A Night to Remember Tour	August 8, 1993	
Rod Stewart	One Night Rockin' Tour	July 30, 2009	
Rod Stewart	2014 Tour	August 12, 2014	Santana
Roger Daltrey & The No Plan B Band	British Rock Symphony Tour	July 4, 1998	
Roger Waters	In the Flesh Tour	July 3, 2000	
Rush	Presto Tour	June 22, 1990	Mr. Big
Rush	Roll the Bones Tour	May 27, 1992	Mr. Big
Rush	Test for Echo Tour	May 27, 1997	
Rush	Vapor Trails Tour	August 24, 2002	
Sammy Hagar & The Waboritas	Heavyweight Champs of Rock 'n' Roll Tour	June 19, 2002	David Lee Roth
Santana	Spirits Dancing in the Flesh Tour	September 2, 1990	
Santana	Dance of the Rainbow Serpent Tour	August 30, 1995	Jeff Beck
Santana	Dance of the Rainbow Serpent Tour	September 28, 1997	Rusted Root
Santana	Dance of the Rainbow Serpent Tour	August 29, 1998	
Santana	Shaman Tour	July 8, 2003	Angélique Kidjo
Santana	2008 Tour	September 13, 2008	Salvador Santana Band
Scorpions	Pure Instinct Tour	June 15, 1996	Alice Cooper & My Head
SCREAM	SCREAM Tour	September 4, 2002	
SCREAM	SCREAM Tour	August 8, 2005	
Shania Twain	Come On Over Tour	July 15, 1998	Leahy
Shania Twain	Come On Over Tour	May 11, 1999	Shane Minor
Smokin' Grooves Festival		July 22, 2002	
Spice Girls	Spiceworld Tour	August 5, 1998	
Steely Dan	Citizen/Tracks Tour	September 6, 1994	
Steely Dan	Art Crimes Tour	August 7, 1996	
Steely Dan	Two Against Nature Tour	June 21, 2000	
Steely Dan	Everything Must Go Tour	August 4, 2003	
Steve Winwood	Roll with It Tour	July 17, 1988	
Steve Winwood	Refugees of the Heart Tour	May 15, 1991	Robert Cray Band
Steven Curtis Chapman	This Moment Tour	August 10, 2008	
Stevie Nicks	Street Angel Tour	September 7, 1994	Darden Smith
Stevie Nicks	Enchanted Tour	July 21, 1998	Boz Scaggs
Stevie Ray Vaughan & Double Trouble	In Step Tour	July 17, 1990	
Stevie Wonder	A Wonder Summer's Night Tour	July 1, 2008	
Sting	...Nothing Like the Sun Tour	August 4, 1988	
Sting	Mercury Falling Tour	August 6, 1996	The Samples & Rusted Root
The String Cheese Incident	Untying the Not Tour	July 27, 2004	
Styx	Edge of the Century Tour	July 6, 1991	Vinnie James
Styx	Return to Paradise Tour	August 1, 1996	Kansas
Styx	Return to Paradise Tour	July 15, 1997	Pat Benatar
Styx	2000 Tour	May 17, 2000	REO Speedwagon & Eddie Money
Styx	2001 Tour	May 24, 2001	Bad Company, Billy Squier & Joe Stark
Styx	Cyclorama Tour	May 26, 2004	Peter Frampton & Nelson
Sugar Water Festival		August 2, 2005	
Sugarland	The Incredible Machine Tour	August 19, 2011	Sara Bareilles
System of a Down	2011 Reunion Tour	May 18, 2011	Gogol Bordello
The Temptations	Legends of Motown Tour	August 18, 1995	Four Tops
Third Day	Wherever You Are Tour	July 7, 2007	MercyMe
Three Dog Night	1991 Tour	September 2, 1991	Steppenwolf & Dave Mason
Tim McGraw	Live Like You Were Dying Tour	July 14, 2004	Big & Rich & The Warren Brothers
Tim McGraw	Emotional Traffic Tour	August 5, 2011	Luke Bryan & The Band Perry
Tim McGraw	Two Lanes of Freedom Tour	June 15, 2013	Brantley Gilbert & Love and Theft
Tina Turner	Wildest Dreams Tour	May 30, 1997	Cyndi Lauper
Tina Turner	Wildest Dreams Tour	May 31, 1997	Cyndi Lauper
Toby Keith	Biggest & Baddest Tour	September 19, 2008	Montgomery Gentry, Carter's Chord & Mica Roberts
Toby Keith	America's Toughest Tour	August 21, 2009	Trace Adkins
Toby Keith	American Ride Tour	August 13, 2010	Trace Adkins & James Otto
Toby Keith	Love in Overdrive Tour	June 15, 2012	Brantley Gilbert & Thomas Rhett
Tom Petty and the Heartbreakers	Strange Behavior Tour	July 17, 1989	The Replacements
Tom Petty and the Heartbreakers	Into the Great Wide Open Tour	August 29, 1991	Chris Whitley
Tom Petty and the Heartbreakers	Dogs With Wings Tour	August 11, 1995	Pete Droge & The Jayhawks
Tom Petty and the Heartbreakers	The Last DJ Tour	August 25, 2002	Jackson Browne
Tony Bennett	2001 Tour	September 11, 2001	k.d. lang
Tool	10,000 Days Tour	August 30, 2006	Isis
Traffic	Far from Home Reunion Tour	May 24, 1994	
Travis Tritt	T-R-O-U-B-L-E Tour	August 31, 1993	Trisha Yearwood & Little Texas
Dr. Dre, Snoop Dogg, Ice Cube, and Eminem	Up in Smoke Tour	August 20, 2000	
Uproar Festival		September 14, 2010	
Uproar Festival		October 5, 2011	
Uproar Festival		September 18, 2012	
Uproar Festival		September 1, 2013	
Van Halen	For Unlawful Carnal Knowledge Tour	September 6, 1991	Alice in Chains
Van Halen	Right Here Right Now Tour	August 10, 1993	Vince Neil Band
Van Halen	The Balance "Ambulance" Tour	September 20, 1995	Skid Row & Our Lady Peace
Van Halen	III Tour	July 16, 1998	Kenny Wayne Shepherd
"Weird Al" Yankovic	Straight Outta Lynwood Tour	August 31, 2007	
Whitney Houston	I'm Your Baby Tonight World Tour	May 24, 1991	After 7
Whitney Houston	My Love Is Your Love World Tour	July 26, 1999	112
The Who	2002 North American Tour	September 19, 2002	
Widespread Panic	2002 Tour	August 17, 2002	Karl Denson's Tiny Universe
Widespread Panic	2002 Tour	August 18, 2002	Karl Denson's Tiny Universe
Wiz Khalifa & A$AP Rocky	Under the Influence of Music Tour	July 23, 2013	B.o.B, Trinidad James & Pro Era
Weezer & Panic! at the Disco	Weezer & Panic! at the Disco Summer Tour 2016	July 24, 2016	
Yanni	Yanni Live, The Symphony Concerts	June 9, 1995	
Yes	30th Anniversary Tour	July 14, 1998	
Yes	Magnification Tour	August 5, 2001	
Zac Brown Band	Great American Road Trip Tour	September 5, 2014	Sturgill Simpson
Zac Brown Band	Great American Road Trip Tour	September 6, 2014	Sturgill Simpson
ZZ Top	Antenna World Tour	September 11, 1994	
ZZ Top	Beer Drinkers and Hell Raisers Tour	August 26, 2003	Ted Nugent
ZZ Top & Jeff Beck	2014 Tour	August 20, 2014	Tyler Bryant & The Shakedown
The 1975	Still... At Their Very Best tour	October 7, 2023	

== See also ==
- List of contemporary amphitheatres
- Red Rocks Amphitheatre
