= It Hit Me Like a Hammer =

1991 single by Huey Lewis and the News

Single by Huey Lewis and the News

from the album Hard at Play
- B-side: "Do You Love Me, or What?"
- Released: August 12, 1991 (Australia)
- Length: 4:01
- Label: EMI USA
- Songwriters: Robert John "Mutt" Lange; Huey Lewis
- Producers: Bill Schnee; Huey Lewis and the News

Huey Lewis and the News singles chronology
"Couple Days Off" (1991)	"It Hit Me Like a Hammer" (1991)	"He Don't Know" (1991)

"It Hit Me Like a Hammer" is a song by American rock band Huey Lewis and the News, released in 1991 by EMI USA, as the second single from their sixth album, Hard at Play (1991). The song was co-written by band leader Huey Lewis and songwriter/producer Robert John "Mutt" Lange. It peaked at No. 15 and 21 on the US Cash Box Top 100 and Billboard Hot 100 charts, becoming their final top-40 hit in the US, and No. 9 on Canada's RPM 100 Hit Tracks chart. The single release contains a remix of the song with a saxophone solo that did not appear on the album.

== Track listings ==
- 7-inch and cassette single

A. "It Hit Me Like a Hammer" – 4:01
B. "Do You Love Me, or What?" – 3:46

- 12-inch and CD single
1. "It Hit Me Like a Hammer" (remix sax solo version) – 4:02
2. "It Hit Me Like a Hammer" – 4:01
3. "Do You Love Me, or What?" – 3:46
- Japanese mini-album
1. "It Hit Me Like a Hammer" (single remix)
2. "It Hit Me Like a Hammer" (album version)
3. "Do You Love Me, or What?"

== Charts ==
=== Weekly charts ===
Chart (1991)	Peak position
Australia (ARIA)	106
Canada Top Singles (RPM)	9
Canada Adult Contemporary (RPM)	8
Europe (European Hit Radio)	7
Germany (GfK)	51
Israel (Israeli Singles Chart)	43
Spain Airplay (Top 40 Radio)	12
UK Airplay (Music Week)	24
US Billboard Hot 100	21
US Adult Contemporary (Billboard)	10
US Cash Box Top 100	15

=== Year-end charts ===
Chart (1991)	Position
Canada Top Singles (RPM)	77
Canada Adult Contemporary (RPM)	70
Europe (European Hit Radio)	66

== Release history ==
Region	Date	Format(s)	Label(s)	Ref.
United States	1991	Cassette	EMI USA	
Australia	August 12, 1991	7-inch vinyl; CD; cassette	EMI USA	
Japan	September 20, 1991	Mini-CD	EMI USA	
