= Atneosen Church =

Church in Innlandet, Norway

- Atneosen kirke
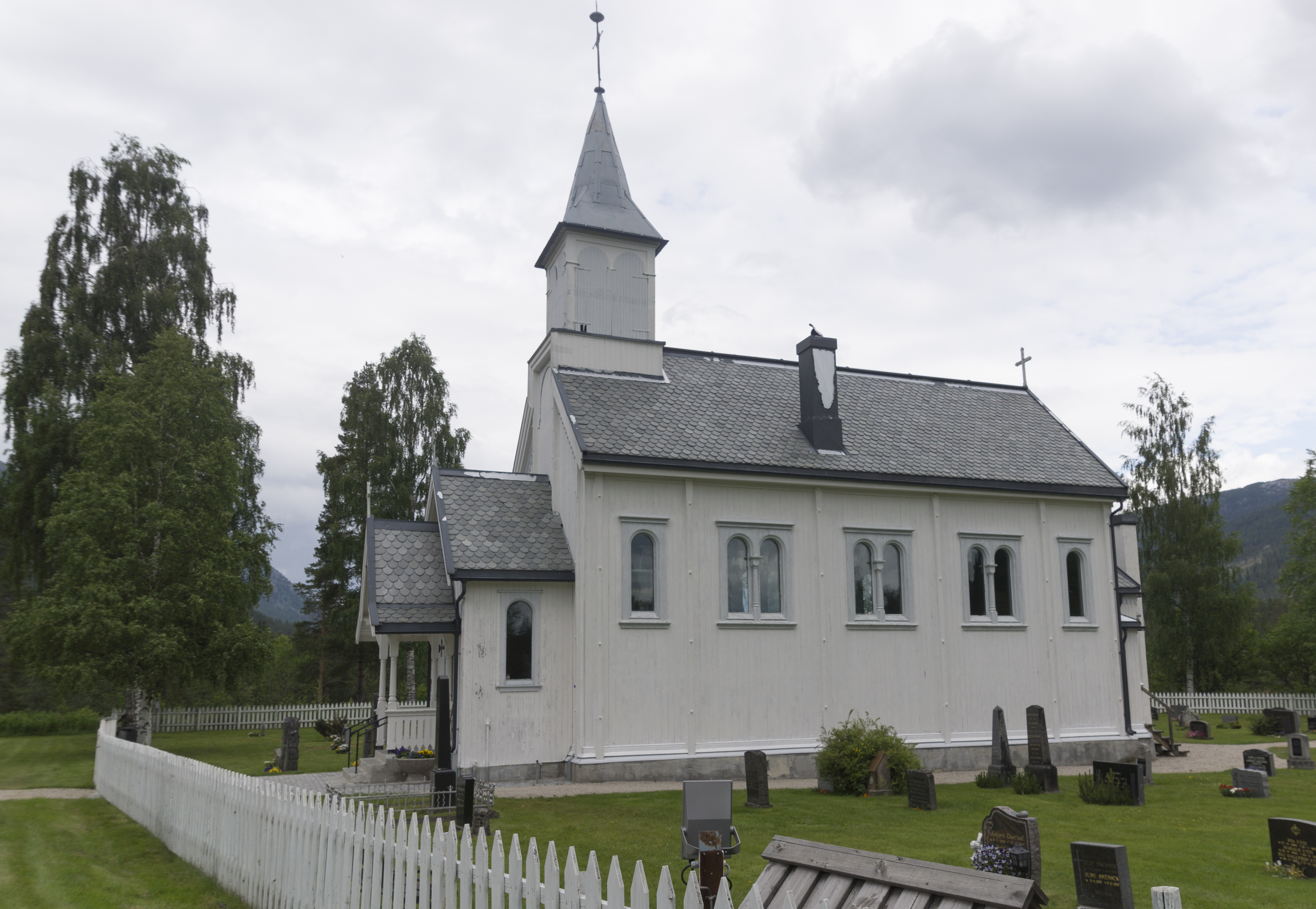
- View of the church
- Atneosen Church
- 61°44′15″N 10°49′01″E
- Location: Stor-Elvdal, Innlandet
- Country: Norway
- Denomination: Church of Norway
- Churchmanship: Evangelical Lutheran

History
- Status: Parish church
- Founded: 1882
- Consecrated: 8 February 1882

Architecture
- Functional status: Active
- Architect: Henrik Nissen
- Architectural type: Rectangular
- Completed: 1882 (144 years ago)

Specifications
- Capacity: 1000
- Materials: Wood

Administration
- Diocese: Hamar bispedømme
- Deanery: Sør-Østerdal prosti
- Parish: Atneosen
- Norwegian Cultural Heritage Site
- Type: Church
- Status: Protected
- ID: 83806

Atneosen Church (Norwegian: Atneosen kirke) is a parish church of the Church of Norway in Stor-Elvdal Municipality in Innlandet county, Norway. It is located in the village of Atna. It is the church for the Atneosen parish which is part of the Sør-Østerdal prosti (deanery) in the Diocese of Hamar. The white, wooden church was built in a rectangular design in 1882 using plans drawn up by the architect Henrik Nissen. The church seats about 100 people.

== History ==
Around 1880, a local man named Haagen N. Atneosen donated some land for an annex chapel to be built. He also financed the construction of the building in exchange for the municipality taking over the ownership and maintenance of the building after its completion. Henrik Nissen was hired to design the building and Edvart Engebretsen was hired as the lead builder. Engebretsen, however, died before the chapel was completed. He became the first person to be buried in the cemetery (even before it was consecrated). It is believed that his cousin Ivar Eriksen took over the construction management after Edvart's death. The chapel was consecrated on 8 February 1882. The church is rectangular in design, with the nave and chancel in the same room. There is a smaller sacristy on the east end of the building. In 1964, a small church porch was built on the west end. Later, the chapel was upgraded to a full parish church.

== Media gallery ==
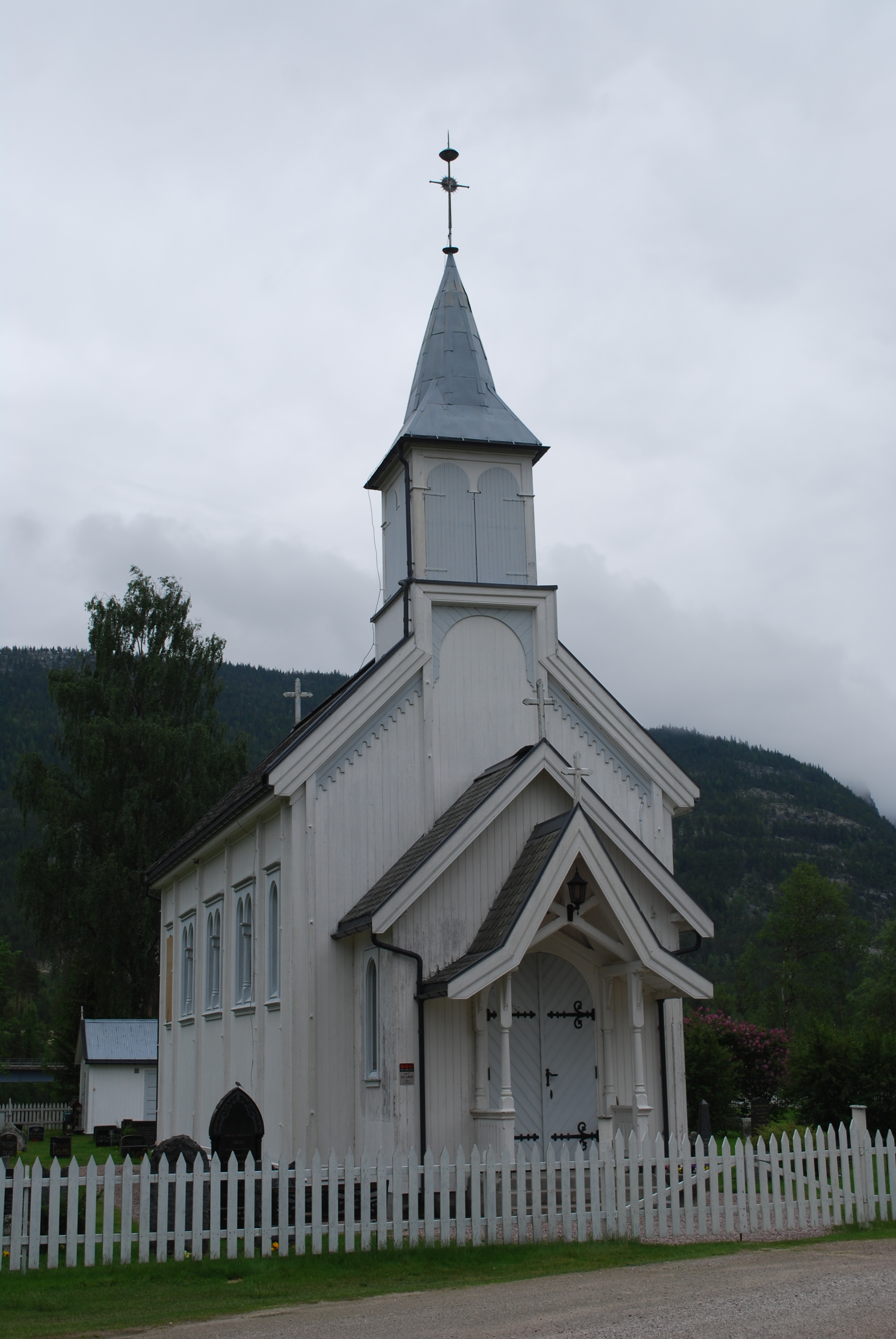

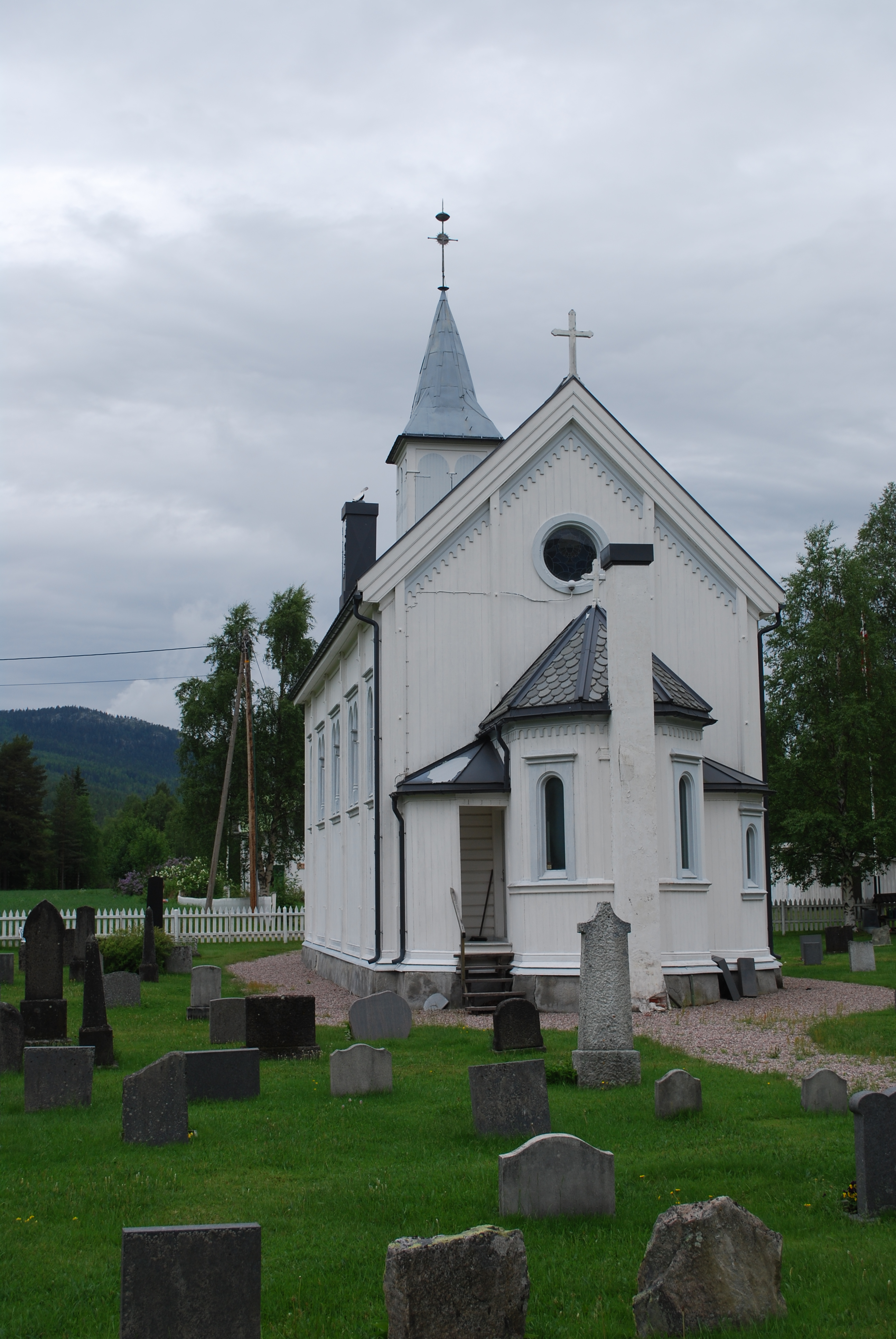

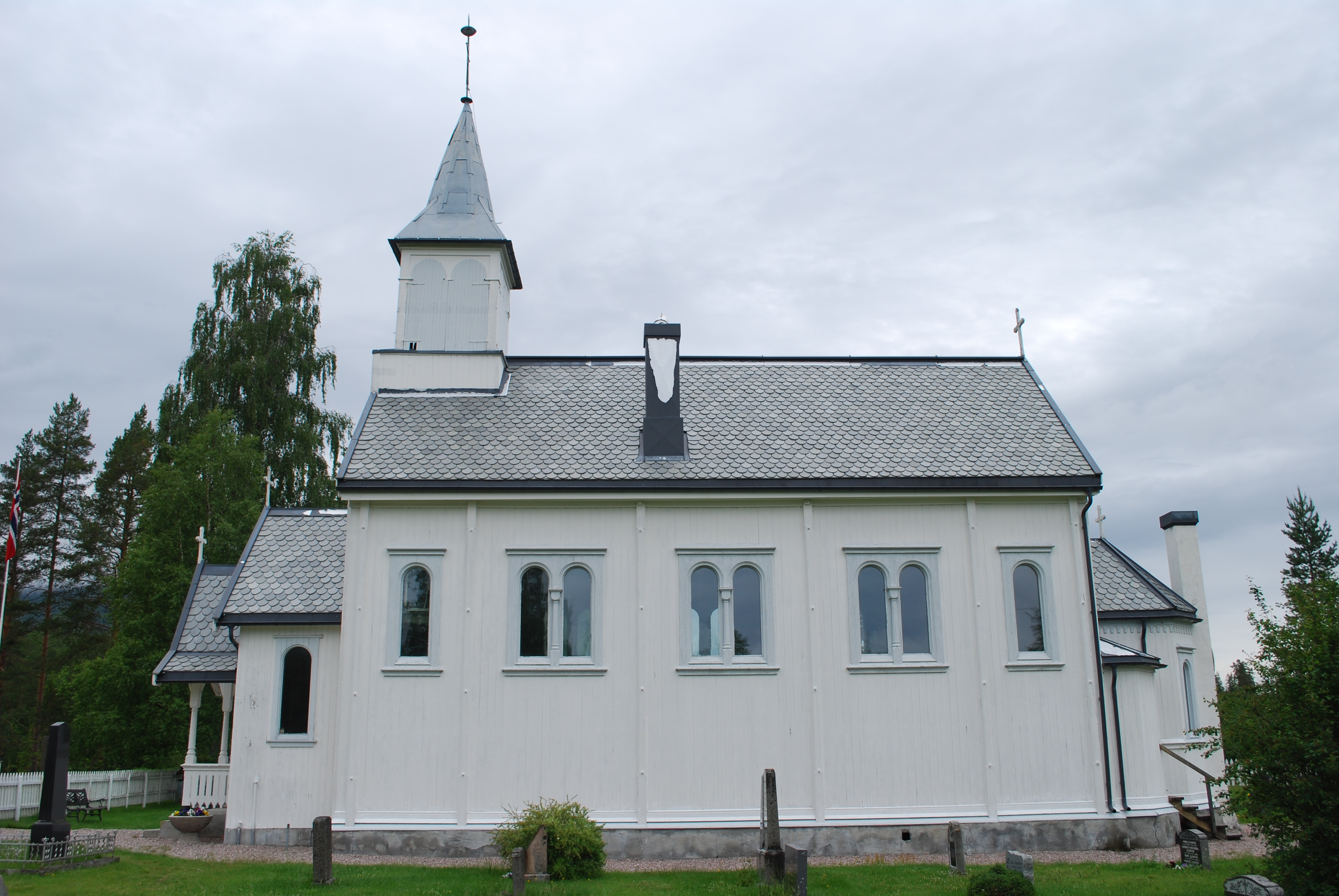

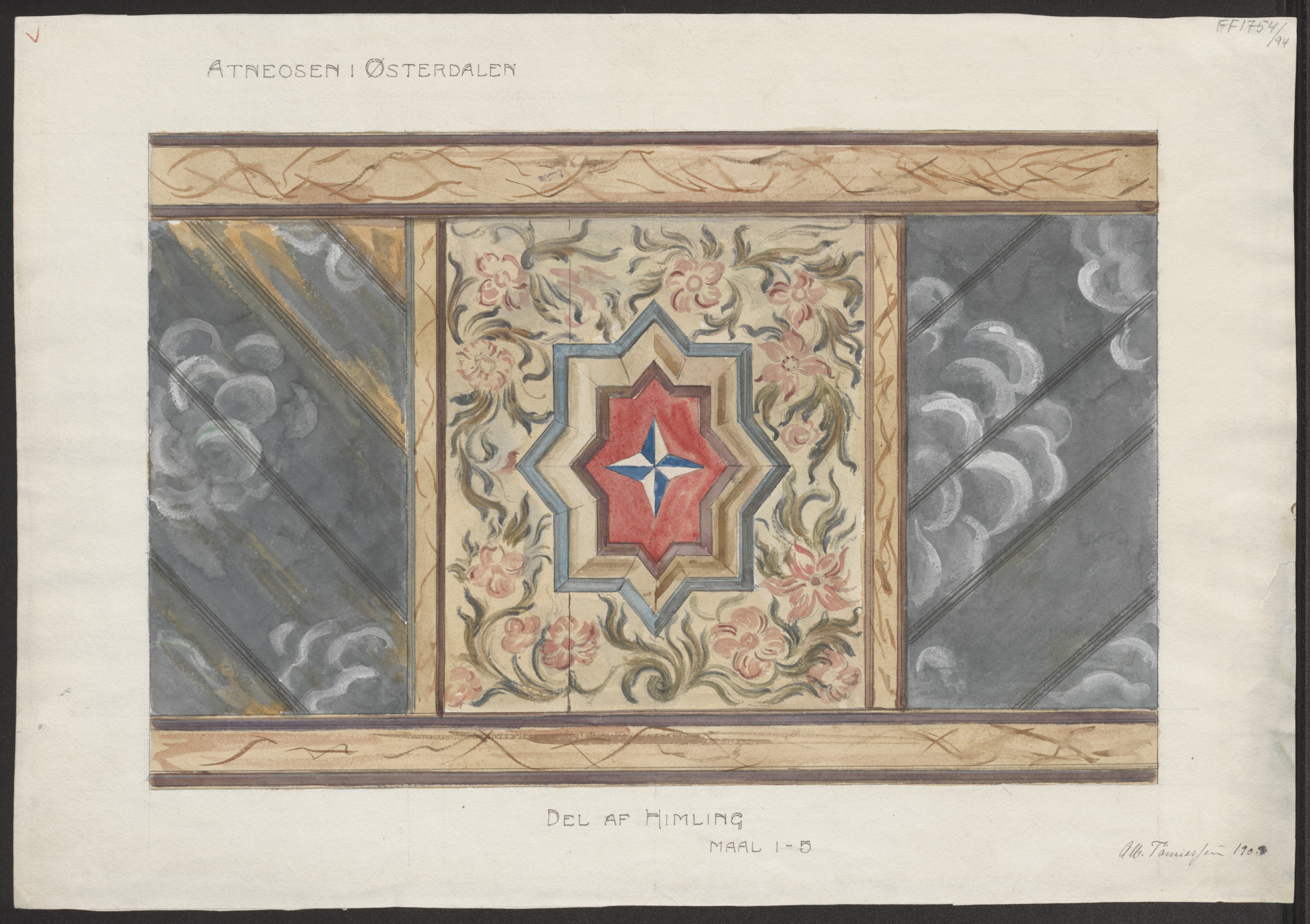

== See also ==
- List of churches in Hamar
