= Atna, Norway =

Village in Stor-Elvdal Municipality, Norway

Atna
- Village
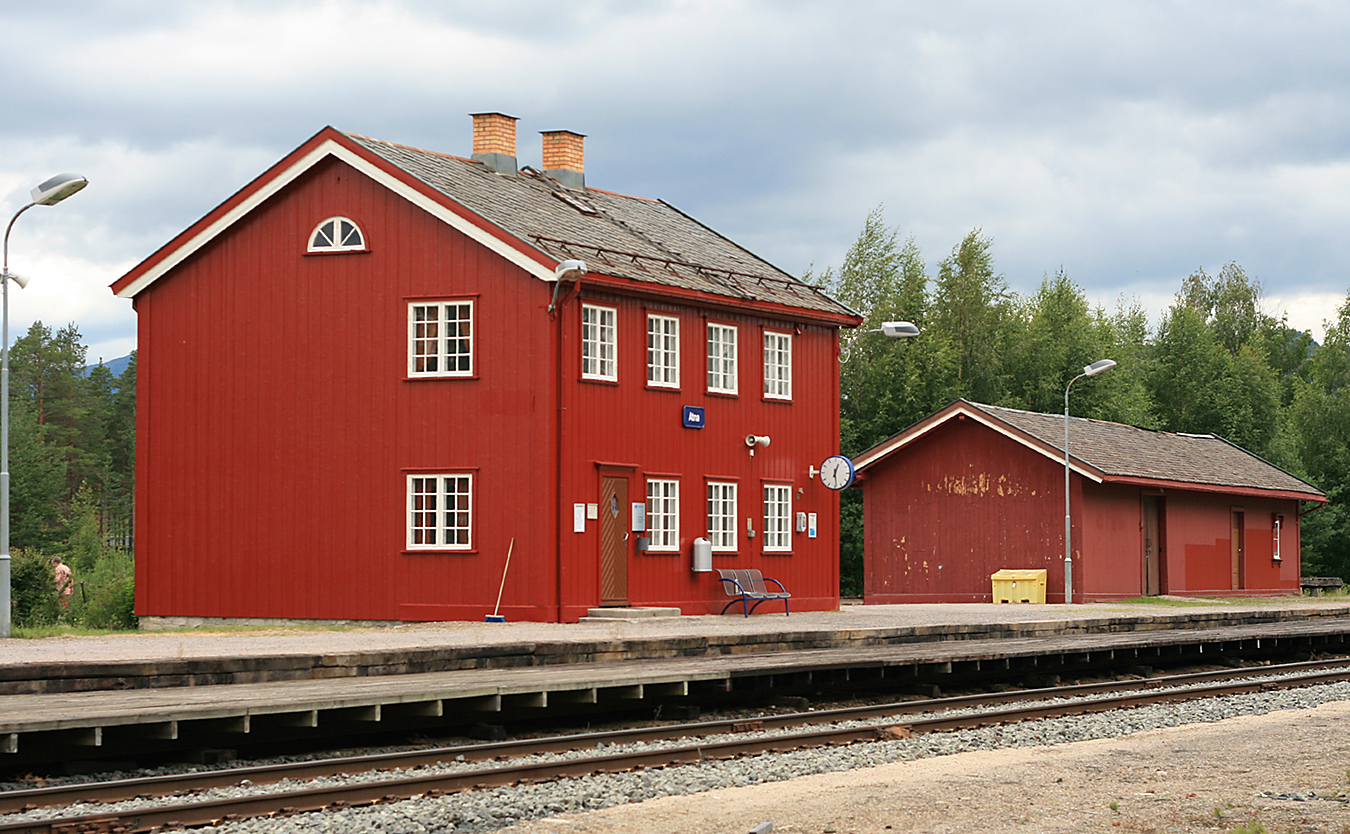
- View of the village railway station
- Interactive map of Atna
- Location within Innlandet Location within Norway
- Coordinates: 61.73078°N 10.83208°E
- Country: Norway
- Region: Eastern Norway
- County: Innlandet
- District: Østerdalen
- Municipality: Stor-Elvdal Municipality
- Elevation: 356 m (1,168 ft)
- Time zone: UTC+01:00 (CET)
  - Summer (DST): UTC+02:00 (CEST)
- Post Code: 2476 Atna

Atna is a village in Stor-Elvdal Municipality in Innlandet county, Norway. The village is located in the Østerdalen valley between the villages of Koppang and Alvdal at the confluence of the rivers Atna and Glomma. The Rørosbanen railway will stop at Atna Station by request. The Rondane mountains, Gudbrandsdalen valley, and the village of Ringebu are nearby.

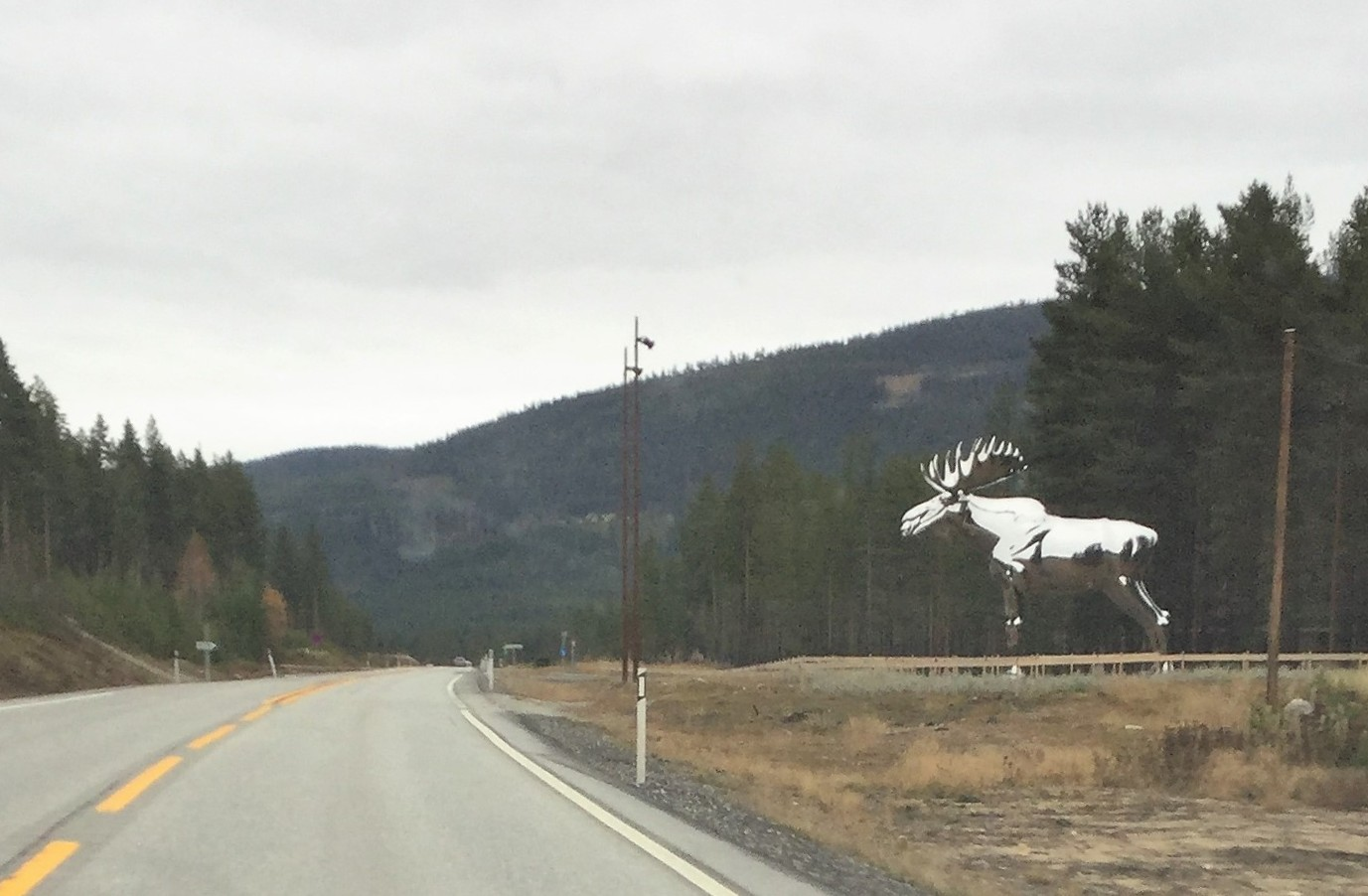
The Big Elk sculpture in 2017

An airstrip is a few minutes away from the brewery. Although regular, commercial flights are unlikely, the 500-metre (1,600 ft) gravel strip is well maintained by skillful, voluntary villagers. It has seen an increasing amount of private traffic by culturally interested pilots. They seize the opportunity to refuel from the local pump and shop at the Coop. The local Glopheim Kafe is the only cafe in the country protected by the Directorate for Cultural Heritage. It is fully licensed and virtually unchanged since the early 1950s. The cafe serves guests with local specialties including the famous Atna beer. The closest place of accommodation is at Atna Camping which is a short walk from the centre of the village.

== Landmarks ==
Atna is home to The Big Elk, a large sculpture of a moose located at the Bjøråa picnic area and rest stop off of the Norwegian National Road 3 which runs through the village.

Atna is also the site of the historic Atneosen Church.

There is a brewery founded by Morten M (of Verdens Gang) and a group of local investors including Sverre Oskar Øverby. The former has since left the brewery, which continues to brew natural beer using a rare post-fermenting process in the bottle.
