= Give Me the Keys (And I'll Drive You Crazy) =

1988 song by Huey Lewis and the News

Single by Huey Lewis and the News

from the album Small World
- B-side: "It's All Right" (Live)
- Released: January 1989
- Genre: Rock
- Length: 4:35
- Label: Chrysalis Records
- Songwriter(s): Bill Gibson; Huey Lewis; Steve Lewis
- Producer(s): Huey Lewis and the News

Huey Lewis and the News singles chronology
"Small World (Part One)" (1988)	"Give Me the Keys (And I'll Drive You Crazy)" (1989)	"Couple Days Off" (1991)

"Give Me the Keys (And I'll Drive You Crazy)" is a song by Huey Lewis and the News, released in January 1989 as the third single from the album Small World. The single peaked at No. 47 on the US Billboard Hot 100.

"Give Me the Keys" was the first Huey Lewis and the News single to fail to reach the Top 40 portion of the Hot 100 since "Workin' for a Livin'" in 1982, ending a string of 13 consecutive Top 40 hits for the band.

== Chart performance ==
Chart (1989)	Peak position
US Billboard Hot 100	47
