= Mac the Moose =

Sculpture in Moose Jaw, Saskatchewan

Mac the Moose Statue
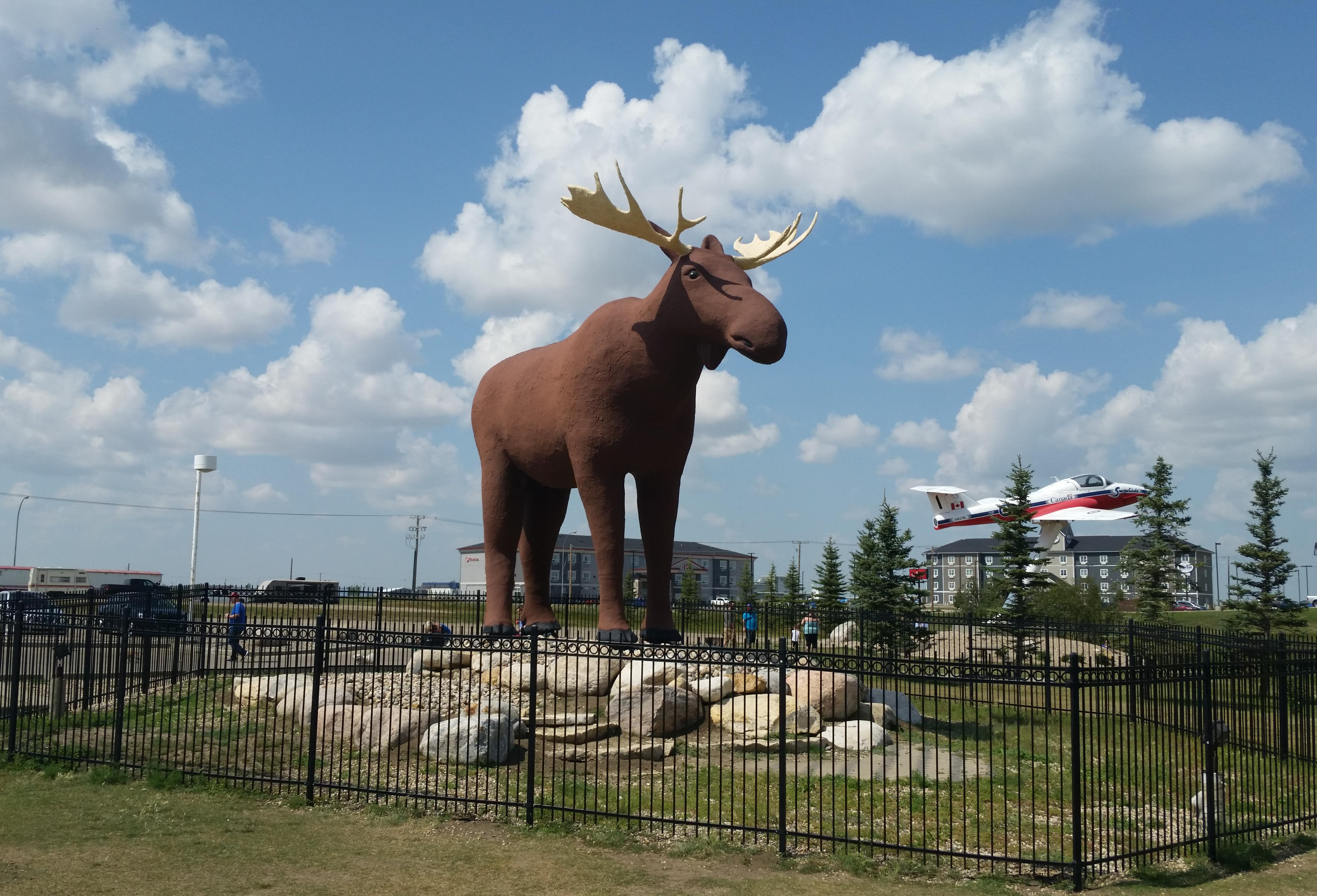
- Mac the Moose in its current location, August 2018

- Location in Canada Mac the Moose Statue (Canada)
- Artist: Don Foulds, Rion White (replacement antlers)
- Year: 1984
- Medium: Steel and concrete sculpture
- Subject: Moose
- Dimensions: 10.36 m (34.0 ft)
- Weight: 10,000 kilograms (22,000 lb)
- Location: Moose Jaw, Saskatchewan, Canada; 50°24′47″N 105°30′37″W
- Owner: City of Moose Jaw

Mac the Moose is a steel and concrete sculpture of a moose in Moose Jaw, Saskatchewan. It is on the grounds of Moose Jaw's visitors' centre, on the corner of E Thatcher Drive and the Trans-Canada Highway. It is claimed to be the world's largest moose at 10.36 metres (34.0 ft) tall and a weight of approximately 10 long tons (10,000 kg).

== History ==
Mac the Moose was built in 1984 by Saskatoon artist Don Foulds with the goal of attracting visitors to the city. The construction process involved a steel frame covered with metal mesh and four coats of cement. A contest was held to name the moose, with the name "Mac" being chosen after Les MacKenzie. The giant moose was one of the city's first tourist attractions. The project was completed in May 1984.

In 2004, Mac was moved 2 kilometres (1.2 mi) by H.C.L Construction Ltd. using a flatbed truck and is now just off of the Trans-Canada highway next to the Moose Jaw visitors' centre. Although Mac has been vandalized many times (once being painted blue and other physical damage was done, including losing his jaw), he still stands, although surrounded by a fence in 2009. In 2013, Mac was honoured by the Moose Jaw Times Herald as Moose Jaw's Best Celebrity.

On Friday, August 16, 2024, the city of Moose Jaw celebrated Mac's 40th birthday. Many from the town and outside of the town came together to celebrate the occasion.

== Rivalry ==
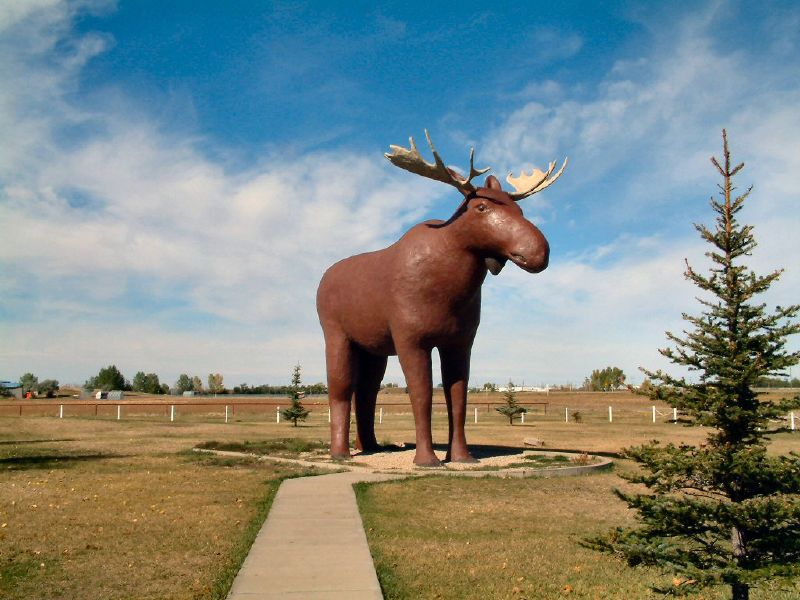
In 2003, prior to being moved and fenced

After 31 years of holding the title of the world's largest moose, in 2015 Mac the Moose was surpassed by another moose statue in Stor-Elvdal Municipality in Norway, called The Big Elk (moose (Alces alces) are called elk in Europe). Conceived by Norwegian artist Linda Bakke, The Big Elk was erected in China and stood about 30 centimetres (12 in) taller. In an interview with Global News on the subject, Moose Jaw's mayor Deb Higgins wasn't bothered, stating that "I think we’ve won the battle, first and foremost that Mac's reputation has spread to Norway and beyond." Subsequently, Mac the Moose was billed as North America's largest moose, with Tourism Moose Jaw referring to it as the "World's Second Largest Moose".

In January 2019, two Canadian comedians urged Moose Jaw residents to add 31 cm (12 in) to Mac's height (likely by extending his antlers or giving him a helmet), so that the moose statue would once again win the title of the world's largest moose.

In October 2019, Mac regained the title of the world's tallest moose when a new set of antlers was installed, raising its height to 10.36 metres (34.0 ft), making it taller than the Norwegian sculpture.
