= Hard at Play =

Studio album by Huey Lewis and the News
- Released: May 7, 1991
- Recorded: 1990–1991
- Studios: Skywalker Sound and The Site (Marin County, California); Schnee Studios (North Hollywood, California); Studio D (Sausalito, California); Apt. 2 Recording (Novato, California); Sub-Par Recording (California).
- Genres: Rock, pop rock
- Length: 46:09
- Labels: Chrysalis (UK); EMI (Most of the world)
- Producers: Huey Lewis and the News; Bill Schnee; Eric Thorngren

Huey Lewis and the News chronology
Small World (1988)	Hard at Play (1991)	Four Chords & Several Years Ago (1994)

Singles from Hard at Play
- 1. "Couple Days Off" Released: April 26, 1991; 2. "It Hit Me Like a Hammer" Released: August 12, 1991; 3. "He Don't Know" Released: 1991

Hard at Play is the sixth album by American rock band Huey Lewis and the News. It was released in 1991 on EMI for most of the world and Chrysalis in the UK. Hard at Play peaked at number 27 on the Billboard 200 pop albums chart and produced two top 40 singles, "Couple Days Off" and "It Hit Me Like a Hammer." Music videos were released for "It Hit Me like a Hammer," "Couple Days Off," and "He Don't Know."

== Critical reception ==
Professional ratings
Review scores
Source	Rating
AllMusic	3/5 stars

In a review for AllMusic, Stephen Thomas Erlewine notes the "return to the straight-ahead blues-inflected pop/rock that made Huey Lewis and the News superstars in the early '80s" with Hard at Play.

== Track listing ==
No.	Title	Writer(s)	Length
1.	"Build Me Up"	Johnny Colla; Huey Lewis	4:28
2.	"It Hit Me Like a Hammer"	Robert John "Mutt" Lange; Lewis	4:01
3.	"Attitude"	Max Carl	4:00
4.	"He Don't Know"	Don Covay; Jon Tiven; Sally Tiven	4:15
5.	"Couple Days Off"	Chris Hayes; Lewis; Geoffrey Palmer	4:56
6.	"That's Not Me"	Michael Ruff	4:15
7.	"We Should Be Making Love"	Andy Goldmark; Steve Kipner; Steve Lindsey	4:01
8.	"Best of Me"	Bonnie Hayes; Kevin Hayes; Annie Stocking	3:57
9.	"Do You Love Me, or What?"	C. Hayes; Lewis; Nick Lowe	3:46
10.	"Don't Look Back"	Lewis; Bill Gibson; David Fredericks	3:44
11.	"Time Ain't Money"	Colla; Lewis	4:46
Total length:			46:24

== Personnel ==
Huey Lewis and the News

- Huey Lewis – harmonica, vocals
- Mario Cipollina – bass
- Johnny Colla – guitar, saxophone, backing vocals
- Bill Gibson – percussion, drums, backing vocals
- Chris Hayes – guitar, backing vocals
- Sean Hopper – keyboards, backing vocals

Additional personnel

- The Gospel Hummingbirds – backing vocals (4)
- David Fredericks – backing vocals (5, 10)
- Mike Duke – backing vocals (6)
- Michael Ruff – backing vocals (6)
- John McFee – guitar (11)

=== Production ===
- Huey Lewis and the News – producers
- Bill Schnee – producer, engineer, mixing
- Eric "ET" Thorngren – co-producer (1, 5), additional engineer
- Bob Brown – executive producer
- Bob Edwards – additional engineer, assistant engineer
- Jeffrey "Nik" Norman – additional engineer
- Ken Allardyce – assistant engineer, mix assistant
- Tony Eckert – assistant engineer
- Stephen Hart – assistant engineer
- Tim Lauber – assistant engineer
- Kevin Scott – assistant engineer
- Jim "Watts" Vereecke – assistant engineer
- Jack Joseph Puig – mixing
- Doug Sax – mastering at The Mastering Lab (Hollywood, CA).
- Henry Marquez – art direction
- Michael Diehl – design
- Aaron Rapoport – photography

== Charts ==
=== Weekly charts ===
Chart (1991)	Peak position
Australian Albums (ARIA)	61
Canadian Albums (RPM)	20
Dutch Albums (Album Top 100)	67
European Top 100 Albums	25
Finnish Albums (Suomen virallinen lista)	9
German Albums (Offizielle Top 100)	14
Italian Albums (AFI)	25
Japanese Albums (Oricon)	10
Japanese International Albums (Oricon)	1
New Zealand Albums (RMNZ)	26
Swedish Albums (Sverigetopplistan)	25
Swiss Albums (Schweizer Hitparade)	9
UK Albums (OCC)	39
US Billboard 200	27
Zimbabwean Albums (ZIMA)	7

=== Year-end charts ===
Chart (1991)	Position
Canadian Albums Chart (RPM)	85

=== Singles ===
Year	Single	Chart	Position
1991	"Couple Days Off"	Album Rock Tracks	3
1991	"Couple Days Off"	The Billboard Hot 100	11
1991	"Build Me Up"	Album Rock Tracks	27
1991	"It Hit Me Like a Hammer"	The Billboard Hot 100	21
1991	"It Hit Me Like a Hammer"	Adult Contemporary	10

== Certifications ==
Region	Certification	Certified units/sales
Canada (Music Canada)	Gold	50,000^{^}
Japan (RIAJ)	Gold	100,000^{^}
United States (RIAA)	Gold	500,000^{^}
^{^} Shipments figures based on certification alone.
