= Couple Days Off =

1991 single by Huey Lewis and the News

Single by Huey Lewis and the News

from the album Hard at Play
- B-side: "Time Ain't Money"
- Released: April 26, 1991 (Japan)
- Length: 4:56 (LP version); 3:15 (short edit)
- Label: EMI USA
- Songwriters: Chris Hayes; Huey Lewis; Geoffrey Palmer
- Producers: Huey Lewis and the News; Bill Schnee; Eric Thorngren

Huey Lewis and the News singles chronology
"Give Me the Keys (And I'll Drive You Crazy)" (1989)	"Couple Days Off" (1991)	"It Hit Me Like a Hammer" (1991)

"Couple Days Off" is a song by American rock band Huey Lewis and the News, released in April 1991 by EMI USA, as the first single from their sixth studio album, Hard at Play (1991). The single peaked at No. 8 and 11 on the US Cash Box Top 100 and Billboard Hot 100 charts, and No. 4 on the Canadian RPM 100 Hit Tracks chart. It also reached the top 40 in Australia, Germany, the Netherlands, and New Zealand. "Couple Days Off" was the band's final top-20 single on the Hot 100.

== Track listings ==
- US cassette single and Japanese mini-CD single
1. "Couple Days Off" – 4:56
2. "Time Ain't Money" – 4:46
- 7-inch and Australian cassette single
1. "Couple Days Off" (short edit) – 3:15
2. "Time Ain't Money" – 4:46
- 12-inch single

A1. "Couple Days Off" (LP version) – 4:57
B1. "Time Ain't Money" – 4:46
B2. "The Heart of Rock & Roll" – 5:01

- CD single
1. "Couple Days Off" (LP version) – 4:57
2. "Time Ain't Money" – 4:46
3. "The Heart of Rock & Roll" – 5:01
4. "Couple Days Off" (short edit) – 3:15

== Charts ==
=== Weekly charts ===
Chart (1991)	Peak position
Australia (ARIA)	40
Canada Top Singles (RPM)	4
Canada Retail Singles (The Record)	12
Europe (Eurochart Hot 100)	76
Europe (European Hit Radio)	25
Germany (GfK)	40
Luxembourg (Radio Luxembourg)	9
Netherlands (Dutch Top 40)	17
Netherlands (Single Top 100)	17
New Zealand (Recorded Music NZ)	24
Spain Airplay (Top 40 Radio)	24
UK Airplay (Music Week)	46
US Billboard Hot 100	11
US Mainstream Rock Airplay (Billboard)	3
US Cash Box Top 100	8

=== Year-end charts ===
Chart (1991)	Position
Canada Top Singles (RPM)	45

== Release history ==
Region	Date	Format(s)	Label(s)	Ref.
United States	1991	Cassette	EMI USA	
Japan	April 26, 1991	Mini-CD	EMI USA	
Australia	May 13, 1991	7-inch vinyl; cassette	EMI USA	
