= Chen Zhen (artist) =

Chinese-French artist (1955–2000)

Chen Zhen (Chinese: 陈箴; 4 October 1955 – 13 December 2000) was a Chinese-French conceptual artist known for his large-scale sculptures and installations such as La Danse de la fontaine émergente in Paris. He is recognized as one of the most important Chinese artists since the 1990s.

Born in Shanghai and educated in Shanghai and Paris, Chen suffered from autoimmune hemolytic anemia and died at age 45. He was the brother of Chen Zhu, a vice chairman of the National People's Congress of China.

== Biography ==
Chen Zhen was born in 1955 to a family of doctors in Shanghai, China. He grew up in the former Shanghai French Concession during the tumultuous decade of the Cultural Revolution. He studied at Shanghai Fine Arts and Crafts School, and later at Shanghai Drama Institute (now Shanghai Theatre Academy), specializing in stage design. In 1982 he became a professor at Shanghai Drama Institute.

When he was 25, Chen was diagnosed with autoimmune hemolytic anemia and was told he might have only five years to live. As China loosened travel restrictions in the 1980s, he left Shanghai in 1986 for Paris, France, where he studied art at the École nationale supérieure des Beaux-Arts and the Institut des Hautes Études en Arts Plastiques (IHEAP). He supported himself by drawing portraits on the street. From 1993 to 1995 Chen was a professor at IHEAP in Paris, and from 1995 to 1999 he taught at the École nationale des beaux-arts in Nancy.

Chen died of cancer in Paris on 13 December 2000. He is buried in the 28th division of the Père Lachaise Cemetery.

== Works and exhibitions ==
Although his career was cut short by disease, Chen had achieved international fame by the time he died. His mature work, created in the last decade of his life, explored "synergy" between different cultural and political environments. He is also known for using furniture and antique Chinese materials in his constructions. His large-scale works, exploring the topics of health and homeland, were well received globally. He held more than 30 solo shows in Europe, Asia, and America. After his death, memorial exhibitions were held at the Institute of Contemporary Art in Boston, MoMA PS1 in New York City, as well as in Greece and Italy. Three of Chen's works were acquired by the National Gallery of Art between 2020 and 2023.

Despite his fame abroad, as of 2015 there have been only two solo exhibitions of his works in his native Shanghai. The first was held at the Shanghai Art Museum in 2006, and the second at the Rockbund Art Museum (2015). The latter was curated by Hou Hanru, artistic director of the MAXXI in Rome. Chen has also had solo exhibitions at the Serpentine Gallery, London in 2001 and De Sarthe Gallery in Hong Kong in 2011 and 2012. Additionally, works from 1991 to 2000 were exhibited at Pirelli HangarBicocca in Milan, Italy in an exhibition titled 'Chen Zhen, Short-Circuits' from 15 October 2020 to 6 June 2021.

=== La Danse de la fontaine émergente ===
Chen Zhen's last major work was the monumental fountain La Danse de la fontaine émergente in the 13th arrondissement of Paris. He died when the work was still a sketch. His widow Xu Min (徐敏), who is also an artist and Chen's close collaborator, spent seven years completing the work of great technical complexity. The installation, which has water circulating at high pressure within a stylized dragon and is illuminated at night, was inaugurated in 2008.

== Family ==
Chen Zhen's father Chen Jialun (陈家伦) and mother Xu Manyin (许曼音) are both prominent doctors and medical professors in Shanghai. He was the youngest of three children. His eldest brother, Chen Zhu, is a hematologist who has served as China's Minister of Health and vice chairman of the Standing Committee of the National People's Congress. He also had a sister named Chen Jian (陈简) or Jian Chen Bristol. He and his wife Xu Min have a son, Chen Bo.

== Bibliography ==
- Rosenberg, David and Xu Min, eds. et al. Chen Zhen: Invocation of Washing Fire. Prato-Siena: Gli Ori, 2003.
- Serpentine Gallery. Chen Zhen: Serpentine Gallery, London : 28 April-3 June, 2001. London: Serpentine Gallery, 2001.
