= Small World (Huey Lewis and the News album) =

Studio album by Huey Lewis and the News
- Released: June 10, 1988
- Recorded: 1987–1988
- Studios: Studio D Recording (Sausalito, California)
- Genres: Rock; pop rock
- Length: 45:38
- Label: Chrysalis
- Producers: Huey Lewis and the News

Huey Lewis and the News chronology
Fore! (1986)	Small World (1988)	Hard at Play (1991)

Singles from Small World
- 1. "Perfect World" Released: June 1988; 2. "Small World (Part One)" Released: 1988; 3. "Give Me the Keys (And I'll Drive You Crazy)" Released: January 1989; 4. "World to Me" Released: 1989; 5. "Walking with the Kid" Released: 1989

Professional ratings
Review scores
Source	Rating
AllMusic	2/5 stars
The Village Voice	C−

Small World is the fifth studio album by American rock band Huey Lewis and the News, released in 1988. It was the band's last album release on Chrysalis Records in the United States. Huey Lewis stated in a Behind the Music interview that the recording process for Small World had the most favorable working conditions compared to previous albums.

Small World peaked at number 11 on the Billboard 200 albums chart.

== Recording ==
The album track "Slammin'" was written for the purpose of being used for highlights for the San Francisco 49ers NFL football team, which the band and especially Lewis are big fans of. "We thought it'd be a cool idea to have an instrumental on the record. Very old school," Lewis recalled. Lewis joked that the song should've just been called "49er Highlights". The team used the song for game highlights.

== Track listing ==
Side one
No.	Title	Writer(s)	Length
1.	"Small World (Part One)"	Chris Hayes; Huey Lewis	3:56
2.	"Old Antone's"	Johnny Colla; H. Lewis	4:48
3.	"Perfect World"	Alex Call	4:10
4.	"Bobo Tempo"	John Ciambotti; Sean Hopper; H. Lewis	4:37
5.	"Small World (Part Two)"	Hayes; H. Lewis	4:05

Side two
No.	Title	Writer(s)	Length
1.	"Walking with the Kid"	Hayes; H. Lewis; Geoffrey Palmer	4:03
2.	"World to Me"	Hayes; H. Lewis	5:21
3.	"Better Be True"	Colla; H. Lewis	5:21
4.	"Give Me the Keys (And I'll Drive You Crazy)"	Bill Gibson; H. Lewis; Steve Lewis	4:38
5.	"Slammin'" (Instrumental)	Greg Adams; Hayes; Palmer	4:35
Total length:			45:38

== Personnel ==
Huey Lewis and the News

- Huey Lewis – lead vocals, harmonica
- Johnny Colla – guitar, saxophone, backing vocals
- Chris Hayes – guitar, backing vocals
- Mario Cipollina – bass
- Sean Hopper – keyboards, backing vocals
- Bill Gibson – drums, percussion, backing vocals

Additional personnel

- The Tower of Power Horns – horns (1, 3, 5, 9, 10):
  - Emilio Castillo – tenor saxophone
  - Steve Grove – tenor saxophone
  - Stephen "Doc" Kupka – baritone saxophone
  - Greg Adams – trumpet, horn arrangements
  - Lee Thornburg – trumpet
- Bruce Hornsby – accordion (2), backing vocals (2)
- Peter Michael – percussion (1, 2, 3, 5, 7, 9, 10)
- Stan Getz – tenor saxophone (1, 5)
- Ralph Arista – backing vocals (4, 6)
- Michael Duke – backing vocals (4, 7)
- Jerome Fletcher – backing vocals (4)
- Joel Jaffe – backing vocals (4)
- Jim Moran – backing vocals (4, 6)
- David Tolmie – backing vocals (4)
- Dwight Clark – backing vocals (6)
- Riki Ellison – backing vocals (6)
- Ronnie Lott – backing vocals (6)
- Joe Montana – backing vocals (6)
- Jim "Watts" Vereecke – backing vocals (6)
- David Fredericks – backing vocals (7)

Production

- Huey Lewis and the News – producers
- Bob Brown – executive producer
- Robert Missbach – engineer, mixing
- Jeffrey "Nik" Norman – additional engineer
- Michael Rosen – assistant engineer
- Tom Size – assistant engineer
- Jim "Watts" Vereecke – assistant engineer
- Bob Ludwig – mastering
- Ralph Arista – guitar technician
- Jerry Daniels – keyboard technician
- Carl Ciasulli – drum technician
- Craig Frazier – art direction, design
- Jock McDonald – photography
- Roger Ressmeyer – cover photography
- Chris Welch – liner notes

Studios

- Recorded at Studio D Recording (Sausalito, California).
- Mixed at Fantasy Studios (Berkeley, California).
- Mastered at Masterdisk (New York, New York).

== Charts ==
=== Weekly charts ===
Chart (1988)	Peak position
Australian Albums (Kent Music Report)	21
Belgian Albums (BEA)	4
Canadian Albums (RPM)	7
Dutch Albums (Album Top 100)	55
European Top 100 Albums	11
Finnish Albums (Suomen virallinen lista)	5
German Albums (Offizielle Top 100)	8
Icelandic Albums (Tónlist)	9
Japanese Albums (Oricon)	17
Japanese International Albums (Oricon)	1
New Zealand Albums (RMNZ)	28
Norwegian Albums (VG-lista)	12
Swedish Albums (Sverigetopplistan)	14
Swiss Albums (Schweizer Hitparade)	10
UK Albums (OCC)	12
US Billboard 200	11

=== Year-end charts ===
Chart (1988)	Position
Canada Top Albums/CDs (RPM)	43
US Billboard 200	88

=== Singles ===
Year	Single	Chart	Position
1988	"Perfect World"	Billboard Hot 100	3
1988	"Perfect World"	Adult Contemporary	2
1988	"Perfect World"	Album Rock Tracks	5
1988	"Small World, Pt. 1"	Billboard Hot 100	25
1988	"Small World, Pt. 1"	Adult Contemporary	19
1988	"Small World, Pt. 1"	Album Rock Tracks	28
1989	"Give Me the Keys (And I'll Drive You Crazy)"	Billboard Hot 100	47

== Certifications ==
Region	Certification	Certified units/sales
United Kingdom (BPI)	Gold	100,000^{^}
United States (RIAA)	Platinum	1,000,000^{^}
^{^} Shipments figures based on certification alone.
