= The Big Elk =

Moose sculpture in Innlandet, Norway

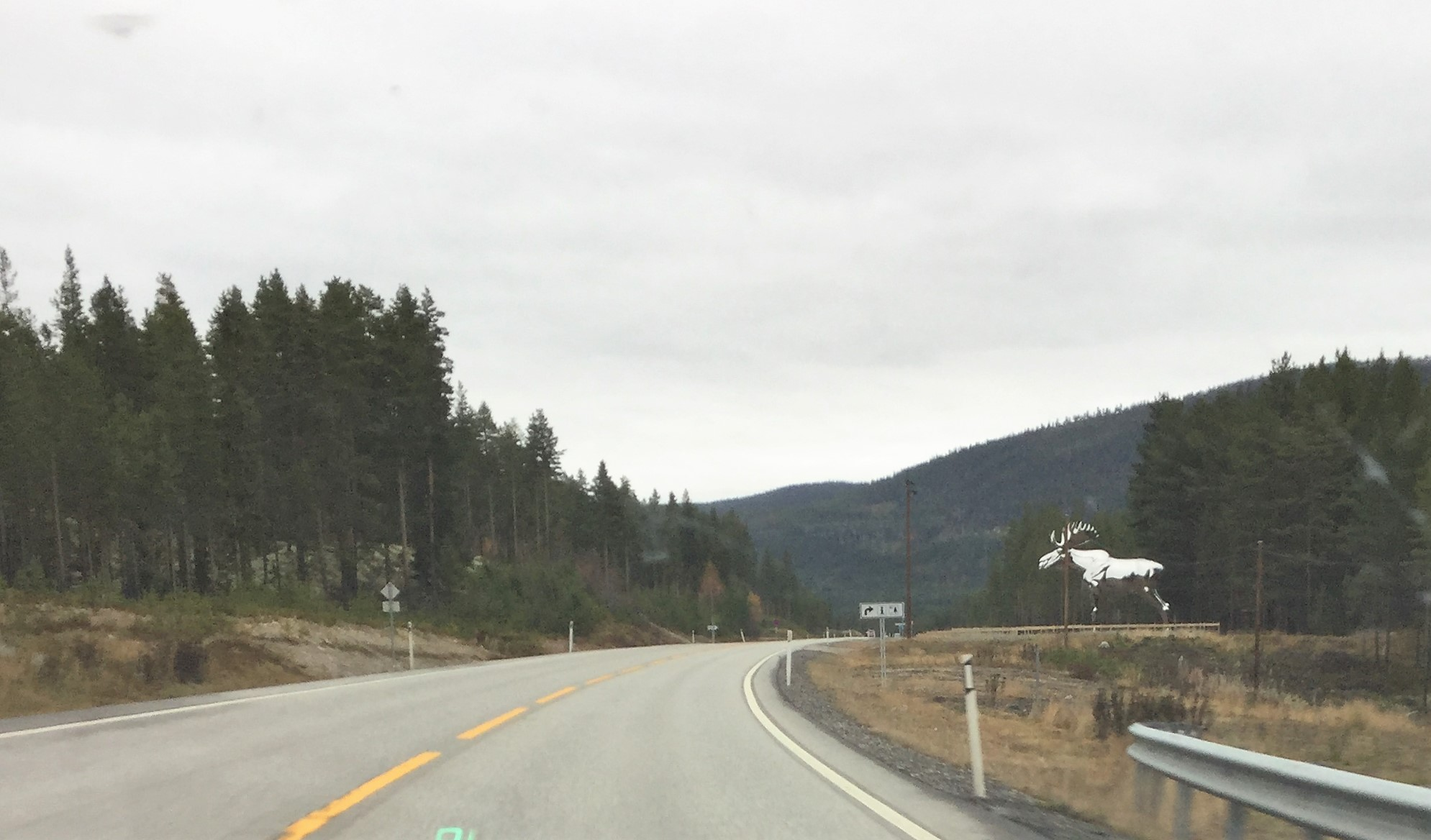
- The sculpture next to National Road 3

- Location in Norway The Big Elk (Norway)
- Artist: Linda Bakke
- Completion date: 2015
- Medium: Polished stainless steel sculpture
- Subject: Moose
- Dimensions: 10.3 m (34 ft)
- Location: Atna, Norway; 61°40′04″N 10°53′04″E

The Big Elk, also known as Storelgen (meaning 'the big elk' in Norwegian), is the world's second-tallest sculpture of an elk/moose (Alces alces; this species is known as elk in Europe and moose in North America). It is near the village of Atna in Stor-Elvdal Municipality in Innlandet county, Norway. It held the title of the tallest moose sculpture for 4 years, from its completion in October 2015 until October 2019.

== The sculpture ==
Paid for by a donation from Sparebank1 Hedmark art foundation, the sculpture was created by the Norwegian artist Linda Bakke in conjunction with the Norwegian Public Roads Administration (NPRA). It was officially unveiled on 15 October 2015. It is close to National Road 3 and is an attempt to reduce traffic accidents by encouraging drivers to take a break and be aware of wildlife on the roads. Stor-Elvdal has Norway's third-highest moose population.

The project started in 2009. The building and installation of the sculpture took around six months. It was produced in Beijing, China, as a Chinese bidder had the best offer both in economic terms and with regard to quality. It is made of polished stainless steel. The height is 10.3 metres (34 ft), and at the time of its completion it was about 50 centimetres (20 in) taller than Mac the Moose in Canada. The sculpture cost a little more than €200,000 (about US$236,000), and the Bjøråa picnic area and rest stop in the area, created by the NPRA, is worth €2.7 million (about $3 million).

== Rivalry and media coverage ==
In January 2019, Canadian comedians Justin Reves and Greg Moore highlighted the fact that The Big Elk was the world's tallest moose statue and called on Canadians to add to the height of Mac the Moose which previously held the title. The comedians set up a GoFundMe page to hire an engineer to make Mac taller, hoping to raise C$50,000. This created widespread attention in Canadian media and international media.

Fraser Tolmie, the mayor of Moose Jaw, told the BBC: 'We're considered to be very mannerly and respectful, but there are things you just don't do to Canadians. You don't mess with Mac the Moose.' A popular suggestion, according to the mayor, is to make Mac's antlers larger, while others have suggested adding a pair of stilettos. In October 2019, a new set of antlers was added to Mac the Moose, making it taller than the Big Elk.
