= Linda Bakke =

Norwegian artist

- Born: August 19, 1973 (age 52)
- Occupation: Artist

Linda Bakke (born 19 August 1973) is a Norwegian artist, residing in Stange Municipality in Eastern Norway.

She is a graduate of Oslo Tegne and Maleskole (a drawing and painting school in Oslo) (1991–1994) and Vestlandets kunstakademi in Bergen (1994–1998). The latter was an art academy that became Bergen Academy of Art and Design in 1996. She also worked as a stonemason assistant for Bård Breivik.

Bakke has worked in wide-ranging fields of art, including sculpture, drawing, painting and photography, and has been responsible for a number of public artworks. Among them is The Big Elk and Seed.
