= Ken Bortolazzo =

American sculptor

Ken Bortolazzo is a sculptor from Santa Barbara, California, known for his work in kinetic and optikinetic stainless steel sculptures.

While studying at Santa Barbara City College, Bortolazzo learned how to weld from Julio Agostini, and apprenticed with painter Kenneth Noland. When New York sculptor George Rickey opened his Santa Barbara workshop, Bortolazzo was hired as his studio assistant, and eventually he evolved into Rickey's acknowledged colleague. After Rickey's death, Bortolazzo became a conservationist for the Rickey estate.

Bortolazzo's sculptures are included in corporate collections, including the Microsoft campus in Redmond, Washington.

A sculpture by Bortolazzo was placed in Century City, California in front of Century Plaza Towers. Another can be seen on the Westmont College campus. In 2008 one of Bortolazzo's sculptures was placed outside the Palm Beach County Convention Center in Florida. Work by Bortolazzo can be seen at the sculpture garden of the Westin Mission Hills Resort in Rancho Mirage, CA.

Bortolazzo's work is in the permanent collection of the Museum of Outdoor Arts.

In 2023 and 2025 Bortolazzo's work was included in shows to raise money for Ganna Walska's botanic garden Lotusland in Montecito, California.

In 2006 sculptures by Bortolazzo were displayed along Santa Barbara's State Street in a joint project between the city and county of Santa Barbara. Also in 2006 Westmont College held a solo show entitled "Ken Bortolazzo: Retrospective".

In 2003 a sculpture by Bortolazzo was placed in front of PTI Technologies in Oxnard, California. It was chosen from 800 entries as part of the city's Art in Public Places Program.

A collection of Bortolazzo's puzzles from the 1980s are housed at Indiana University Bloomington in the Jerry Slocum Mechanical Puzzle Collection in the Lilly Library.

Bortolazzo is one of the artists featured in Tina Skinner's book, 100 Artist of the West Coast II. Bortolazzo is also included in Mark Robert Halper's book, Between Seer and Seen: Celebrating the Artists of Santa Barbara County.

In addition to his artistic career, Bortolazzo worked as a professional lobster fisherman, a period of his life that was featured as a cover story in the May 1984 issue of Pacific Fishing.
