= La Danse de la fontaine émergente =

Monumental fountain in Paris, France

Coordinates: 48°50′21″N 02°22′14″E

La Danse de la fontaine émergente is a monumental fountain constructed in Paris. Located on Place Augusta-Holmes, rue Paul Klee, near Gare d'Austerlitz in the 13th arrondissement, it was designed by French-Chinese sculptor Chen Zhen, who died in 2000, and was completed by his wife Xu Min in 2008.

== Description ==
The fountain is designed to resemble a dragon winding its way around the square, emerging and submerging from the pavement. Constructed of stainless steel, glass and plastic, the dragon's transparent skin shows the water flowing within.

The fountain is in three parts. An opaque bas-relief dragon appears to emerge from the water-supply plant wall and plunge underground. The transparent second and third parts show the dragon seeming to arch out of the pavement. Water under pressure flows within and is illuminated at night.

== History ==
The fountain was commissioned by the City of Paris in 1999 and inaugurated on February 6, 2008. Although the artist died in 2000, he left sketches showing how the fountain should look. The project was relaunched by the City of Paris in 2001 and finished by Xu Min, the sculptor's spouse and collaborator. The fountain was financed by the City of Paris and the Ministry of Culture of France.

== See also ==
- Fountains in Paris
- Fountains in France
- List of fountains in Paris
- Gare d'Austerlitz
