= Edmonton Composting Facility =

Municipal site in Canada, 1999 to 2019

Coordinates: 53°35′47″N 113°20′25″W

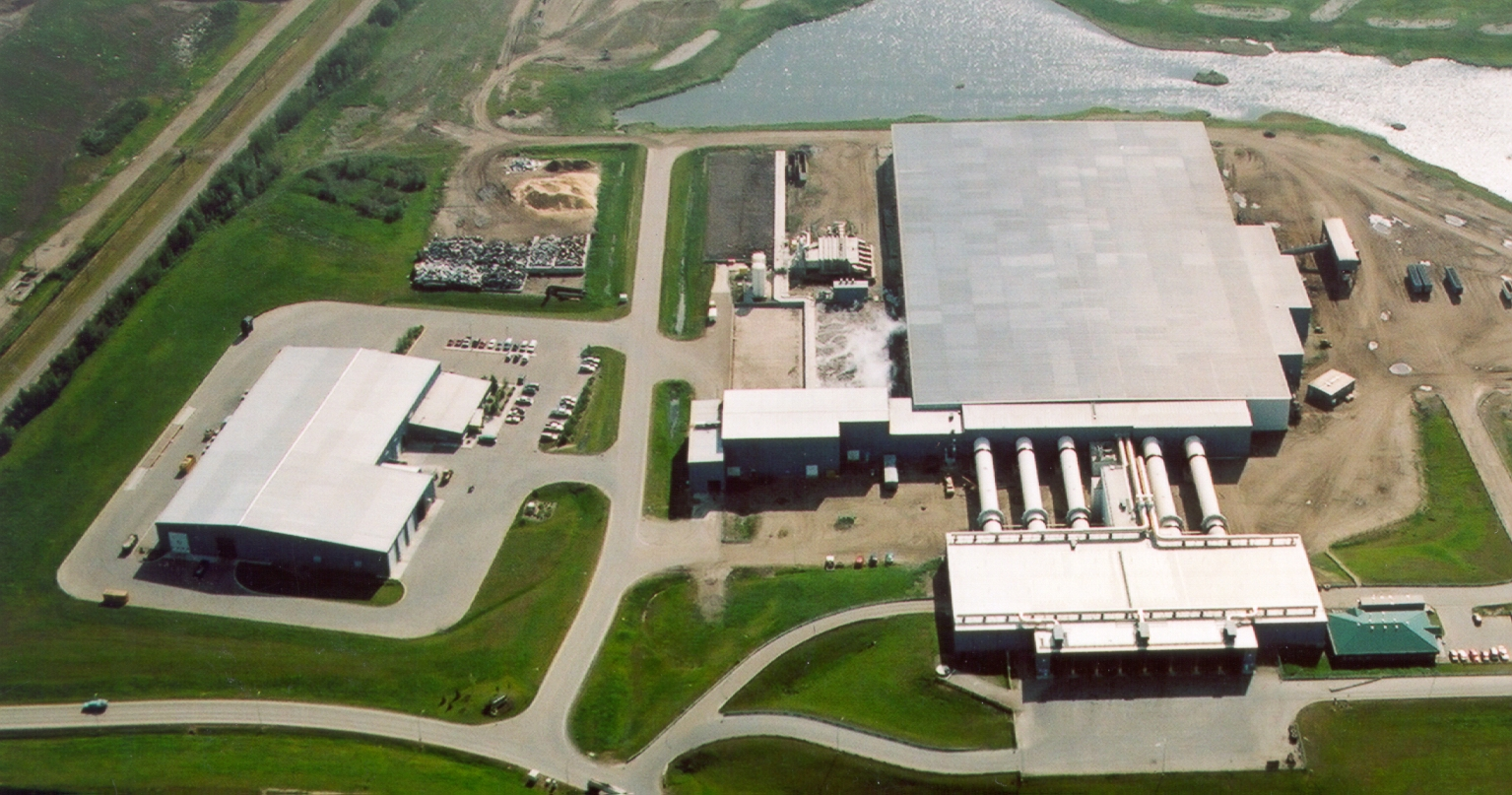
Edmonton Composting Facility in 2009

The Edmonton Composting Facility was the site of the Canadian City of Edmonton's co-composting system for processing organic waste. Co-composting involves mixing household waste with biosolids (sewage sludge), and using microorganisms to break them down into simple compost. Waste was separated from general garbage.

In 2017 structural issues were identified in the roof of the aeration hall and by spring of 2019 conditions had deteriorated to the point that it was no longer safe to continue to operate the facility. The facility will be demolished and organic waste will be directed to the recently completed Anaerobic Digestion Facility.

== Size ==
Built in 1999, the Edmonton Composting Facility was the largest of its kind in North America, both in volume and capacity. At 38,690 square metres (416,500 square feet) in size it was also the largest stainless steel building in North America and could process 200,000 tonnes (220,000 tons) of residential waste and 25,000 tonnes (25,000 long tons; 28,000 short tons) (dry) of biosolids each year. A replacement facility is in the works along with the now-functional Anaerobic Digestion Facility.
