= Harry Malinski =

Harry Joseph Malinski (born 4 August 1991), known as CryptoVet, is an Asian-American writer, journalist, cryptocurrency analyst and retired veterinary surgeon. He was Chief Technology Officer of PennyFly Entertainment, named by Pepperdine University as one of the “Most Fundable Companies" in the United States.

== Early life ==
Malinski graduated from the College of Veterinary Medicine in 2017, going on to practice for a non-profit organization that utilized his surgical skills to assist with the animal population in high-volume, high quality spay and neuters.

In October 2020, after a nine month investigation by the Texas Board of Veterinary Medical Examiners, Malinski's Texas Veterinary License was suspended and never renewed for violating the Section of the Texas Veterinary Licensing Act which prohibits chronic or habitual intoxication and drug addiction, providing false information on his DEA license application, failure to adequately maintain patient prescription monitoring records, and veterinary drug diversion by writing and calling in prescriptions for nonexistent animals and for human use by himself and others. During the pandemic, Malinski shifted from veterinary medicine to journalism and technology, focusing on cryptocurrencies and blockchain projects.

== Career ==
Malinski sought to provide free financial education through his YouTube channel. Malinski is recognized in cryptocurrency circles as “CryptoVet” for his knowledge of blockchain technology, charting analysis, NFTs, and trading. While streaming live on Twitch, he generated over $250,000 in profit through utilizing his trading strategies in real-time. A guest on web3 shows, he reported within the blockchain and NFT communities, going on to interview Cardano's founder Charles Hoskinson. Malinski co-hosts the interactive CryptoAnswered Podcast alongside Kelly Kellam on Twitter Spaces.

Malinski is the Chief technology officer for PennyFly Entertainment, a by-artists-for-artists collective that provides services for artists and producers. He focuses on providing clients ways to independently monetize through blockchain-based initiatives.
