= Museum of Outdoor Arts =

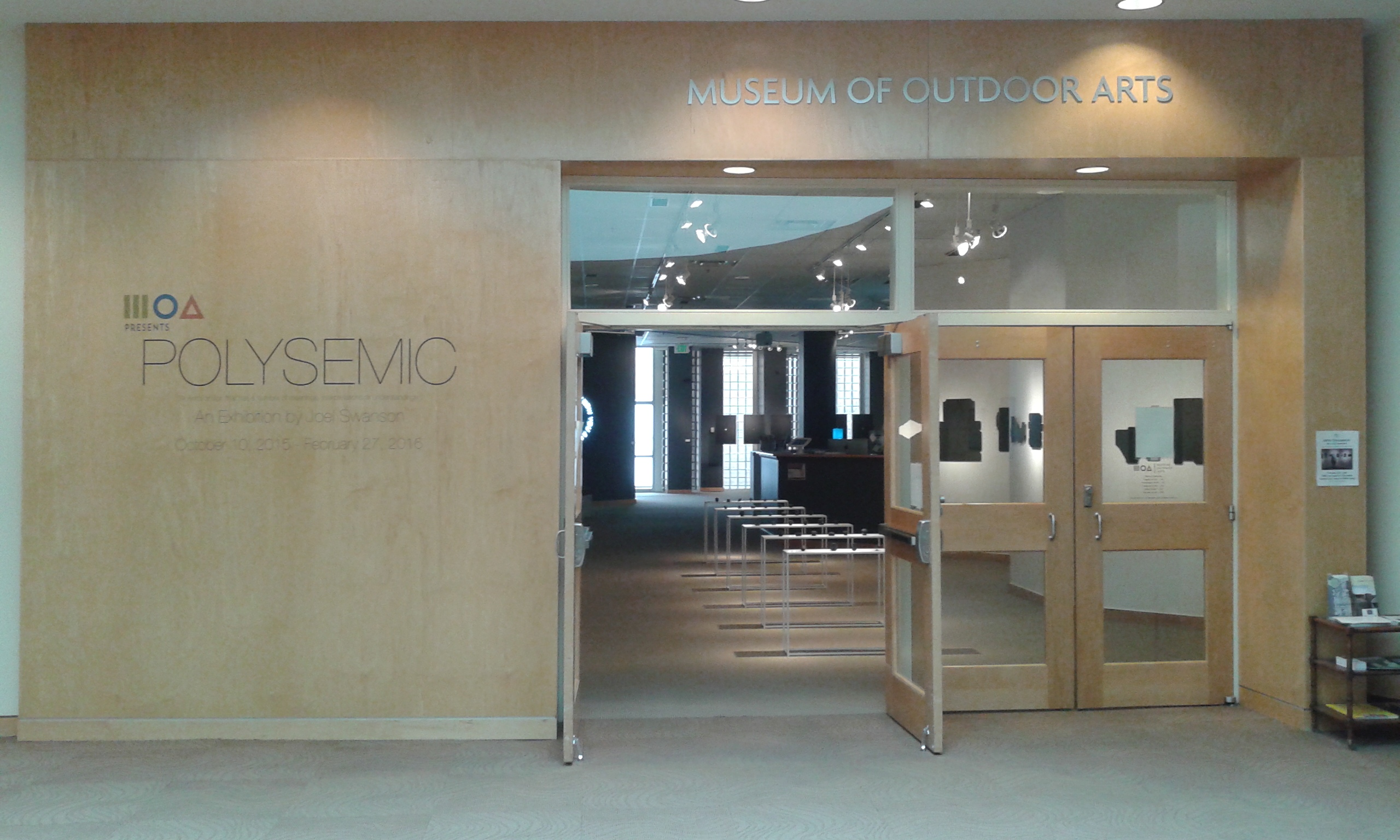
- Established: 1981
- Location: 6331 S. Fiddler's Green Circle; Greenwood Village, Colorado (United States)
- Coordinates: 39°36′09″N 104°53′37″W
- Type: Art museum
- Website: www.moaonline.org

Museum of Outdoor Arts (MOA) is a non-profit museum and gallery based in Englewood, Colorado.

It was founded in 1981 by John W. Madden, Jr. and his daughter, Cynthia Madden Leitner. Open 365 days a year, the outdoor sculpture, much of it placed in public spaces, combines fine art, architecture, and landscape design. Until 2022, the MOA held temporary indoor exhibits. The organization relocated its headquarters in 2022 to Marjorie Park at Fiddler's Green Amphitheatre where it now has a renewed focus on outdoor arts and no longer offers indoor galleries or indoor public spaces. MOA hosts special events, outdoor art exhibitions and performances.

Museum of Outdoor Arts owns Fiddler's Green Amphitheatre and currently leases the space to Anschutz Entertainment Group after its contract expired with LiveNation in 2013.

The museum's collections include a limestone Medici lion sculpture.
