= The Heart of Rock & Roll – The Best of Huey Lewis and The News =

The Heart of Rock & Roll

Greatest hits album by Huey Lewis and the News
- Released: 1992
- Recorded: 1980–1991
- Genre: Rock
- Label: Chrysalis/Capitol

Professional ratings
Review scores
Source	Rating
AllMusic	4.5/5 stars

The Heart of Rock & Roll – The Best of Huey Lewis and The News is a compilation album by American rock band Huey Lewis and the News, released in 1992. It includes singles and album tracks from five of the band's studio albums―Huey Lewis and the News (1980), Picture This (1982), Sports (1983), Fore! (1986) and Small World (1988)―plus two tracks from the Back to the Future soundtrack (1985) and a live B-side.

== Track listing ==
No.	Title	Writer(s)	Origin	Length
1.	"The Power of Love"	Huey Lewis; Chris Hayes; Johnny Colla	Back to the Future soundtrack	3:55
2.	"Hip to Be Square"	Lewis; Bill Gibson; Sean Hopper	Fore!	4:03
3.	"Do You Believe in Love"	Robert John "Mutt" Lange	Picture This	3:28
4.	"If This Is It"	Lewis; Colla	Sports	3:51
5.	"Some of My Lies Are True"	Lewis; Hayes; Colla; Gibson; Hopper; Mario Cipollina	Huey Lewis and the News	3:22
6.	"Workin' for a Livin'" (live)	Lewis; Hayes	B-side to "The Heart of Rock & Roll" single	4:02
7.	"Bad Is Bad"	Lewis; Hopper; Alex Call; John Ciambotti; John McFee; Michael Schriener	Sports	3:47
8.	"I Want a New Drug"	Lewis; Hayes	Sports	3:33
9.	"The Heart of Rock & Roll"	Lewis; Colla	Sports	4:05
10.	"Heart and Soul"	Mike Chapman; Nicky Chinn	Sports	4:11
11.	"Jacob's Ladder"	Bruce Hornsby; John Hornsby	Fore!	3:30
12.	"Stuck with You"	Lewis; Hayes	Fore!	4:27
13.	"Trouble in Paradise"	Lewis; Hayes; Colla; Gibson; Hopper; Cipollina	Huey Lewis and the News	3:10
14.	"Walking on a Thin Line"	Andre Pessis; Kevin Wells	Sports	4:02
15.	"Perfect World"	Call	Small World	4:06
16.	"Small World (Part One)"	Lewis; Hayes	Small World	3:53
17.	"Back in Time"	Lewis; Hayes; Colla; Hopper	Back to the Future soundtrack	4:19

== Charts ==
Chart (1992)	Peak position
Australian Albums (ARIA)	23
German Albums (Offizielle Top 100)	54
Japanese Albums (Oricon)	40
Swiss Albums (Schweizer Hitparade)	39
UK Albums (OCC)	23

== Certifications ==
Region	Certification	Certified units/sales
Australia (ARIA)	Gold	35,000^{^}
New Zealand (RMNZ)	Platinum	15,000^{^}
United Kingdom (BPI)	Silver	60,000^{^}
^{^} Shipments figures based on certification alone.
