= Time Flies... The Best of Huey Lewis & the News =

Greatest hits album by Huey Lewis and the News
- Released: October 29, 1996
- Recorded: 1981–1996
- Genre: Rock
- Label: Elektra
- Producer: Bob Brown

Huey Lewis and the News chronology
Four Chords & Several Years Ago (1994)	Time Flies... The Best of Huey Lewis & the News (1996)	Plan B (2001)

Singles from Time Flies... The Best of Huey Lewis & the News
- 1. "100 Years from Now" Released: 1996

Professional ratings
Review scores
Source	Rating
AllMusic	4/5 stars

Time Flies is a greatest hits album by American rock band Huey Lewis and the News, released in 1996. The album also features four previously unreleased tracks. This marks the first time "The Power of Love" was available on an International Huey Lewis and the News album (it had previously been available on the UK release of the Fore! album). The song "So Little Kindness" was later included on the 2001 album Plan B as Lewis felt it needed a second chance. The song "100 Years from Now" was originally conceived for a planned Huey Lewis solo album that was later cancelled.

== Track listing ==
1. "The Heart of Rock & Roll" (Johnny Colla, Huey Lewis) – 5:04
2. "Heart and Soul" (Mike Chapman, Nicky Chinn) – 4:12
3. "Doing It All for My Baby" (Mike Duke, Phil Cody) – 3:37
4. "Do You Believe in Love" (Robert John Lange) – 3:28
5. "Trouble in Paradise" (live) (Colla, Bill Gibson, Chris Hayes, Sean Hopper, Lewis, Mario Cipollina) – 4:32
6. "The Power of Love" (Hayes, Lewis, Colla) – 3:54
7. "If This Is It" (Colla, Lewis) – 3:52
8. "Bad Is Bad" (Alex Call, John Ciambotti, Hopper, Lewis, John McFee, Michael Schreiner) – 3:47
9. "Workin' for a Livin'" (Hayes, Lewis) – 2:39
10. "It's Alright" (Curtis Mayfield) – 3:04
11. "Stuck with You" (Hayes, Lewis) – 4:26
12. "I Want a New Drug" (Hayes, Lewis) – 4:45
13. "100 Years from Now" (Marcel East, Nathan East, Lewis) – 3:46
14. "So Little Kindness" (Hayes, Lewis, Rob Sudduth) – 4:14
15. "'Til the Day After" (Joe White, Steve Carter, Hopper) – 3:27
16. "When the Time Has Come" (Hayes, Lewis) – 4:26
- "Trouble in Paradise" is a live recording that was included on the 1985 album We Are the World.
- "It's Alright" is an a cappella cover that was included on the 1993 album People Get Ready: A Tribute to Curtis Mayfield.
- The last four tracks were new recordings for this album.

== Personnel ==
Huey Lewis and the News

- Huey Lewis – harmonica, vocals
- Johnny Colla – guitar, saxophone, backing vocals
- Bill Gibson – drums, backing vocals
- Chris Hayes – guitar, backing vocals
- Sean Hopper – keyboards, backing vocals
- Mario Cipollina – bass (tracks 1–12)
- John Pierce – bass (tracks 13–16)

Additional personnel

- Marvin McFadden – trumpet
- Ron Stallings – tenor saxophone
- Rob Sudduth – baritone saxophone, tenor saxophone
- Jack Jacobsen – organ
- Joe White (a.k.a. Joseph Andre' White) – backing vocals
- Alexandria "Sandy" Griffith – backing vocals
- Conesha Owens – backing vocals
- Tower of Power

Production

- Producers: Huey Lewis and the News ("It's Alright" HLN and Joseph Andre' White)
- Engineers: Jim Gaines, Phil Kaffel, Bob Missbach, Jim "Watts" Vereecke, Kevin Scott, Andy Taub
- Mixing: Bob Clearmountain, Malcolm Pollack, Dave Musgrove
- Originally mastered by: Ted Jensen at Sterling Sound (tracks: 1, 2, 7, 8, 12), Bob Ludwig at Masterdisk (tracks: 3 to 5, 9 to 11), Steve Hall at Future Disc Systems (track 6)
- Compilation mastered by: Bob Ludwig at Gateway Studios, Portland, Maine
- Art direction and design: Jim deBarros
- Photography: A. Binkley, Norm Fisher, Robin Kaplan, Ross Marino, Jim McNaughton, Ralph Merzlak, Roger Ressmeyer, Ron Slenzak, Robert Specter

== Charts ==
Chart (1996)	Peak position
Danish Albums (Tracklisten)	4
New Zealand Albums (RMNZ)	3
US Billboard 200	185
