= 1984 MTV Video Music Awards =

1984 Award ceremony

- Date: Friday, September 14, 1984
- Location: Radio City Music Hall, New York City
- Country: United States
- Hosted by: Dan Aykroyd and Bette Midler

Highlights
- Most awards: Herbie Hancock (5)
- Most nominations: Cyndi Lauper (9)
- Website: mtv.com/vma/1984

Television/radio coverage
- Network: MTV
- Produced by: Don Ohlmeyer; Bob Pittman; Edd Griles
- Directed by: Edd Griles

The 1984 MTV Video Music Awards aired live on September 14, 1984. The inaugural ceremony honored the best music videos released between May 2, 1983 and May 2, 1984, and was hosted by Dan Aykroyd and Bette Midler at the Radio City Music Hall in New York City.

Herbie Hancock was the show's most-awarded artist, taking home five awards, followed by Michael Jackson, who won three. The main award, Video of the Year, went to The Cars for "You Might Think". This was the first instance of only a few in the show's history where the video of the year did not win any other awards. Hancock's "Rockit" and The Police's "Every Breath You Take" were the most-nominated videos, receiving eight nominations apiece. Cyndi Lauper was the most-nominated artist of the night, with nine overall for two of her videos: six for "Girls Just Want to Have Fun", which eventually won the Moonman for Best Female Video, and three for "Time After Time".

Other major nominees included Jackson and The Cars, both of whom received six nominations each for their videos "Thriller" and "You Might Think" respectively; ZZ Top, who received six nominations among their videos for "Legs", "Sharp Dressed Man", and "Gimme All Your Lovin'"; and Billy Idol, who garnered five nominations for "Dancing with Myself" and "Eyes Without a Face". Lastly, David Bowie earned four nominations for his "China Girl" and "Modern Love" videos, and was also one of the honorees for the Video Vanguard award.

== Background ==
MTV announced that it would host the first annual Video Music Awards in June 1984. Don Ohlmeyer was hired to produce the ceremony in a similar energetic fashion to his work in sports broadcasting. Dan Aykroyd and Bette Midler were announced as the ceremony's hosts in mid-July 1984. Nominees and winners were selected by 1,500 individuals representing the record industry. Following its initial MTV airing, the ceremony was syndicated to broadcast television.

== Performances ==
List of musical performances
Artist(s)	Song(s)	Ref.
Rod Stewart	"Infatuation"	
Madonna	"Like a Virgin"	
Huey Lewis and the News	"I Want a New Drug"	
David Bowie	"Blue Jean" (Pre-taped from London)	
Tina Turner	"What's Love Got to Do with It"	
ZZ Top	"Sharp Dressed Man"	
Ray Parker Jr.	"Ghostbusters"	

Madonna's performance of "Like a Virgin" has been referred to as one of the most "unforgettable" and "iconic" moments in both pop culture and VMA history for the singer's fashion and her "provocative moves". She emerged from a 17-foot tall wedding cake wearing a "racy", "risque", see-through wedding dress and bustier, with a silver belt buckle that read "BOY TOY". While descending the steps of the cake, one of her high heeled shoes slipped off, prompting her to dive to the floor and roll around to cover up the wardrobe malfunction. Her attempt to retrieve the shoe inadvertently led to her flashing her underwear on live television—Rolling Stone listed the moment as the sixth-most outrageous in MTV VMA history. Madonna later told Billboard after the incident, "So I thought, 'Well, I'll just pretend I meant to do this,' and I dove onto the floor and I rolled around. And, as I reached for the shoe, the dress went up. And the underpants were showing". In 2017, the outlet ranked her performance as the second-greatest award show performance of all time, saying that after her they "became the historical record; the way we remember stars at their most iconic, and the way they demonstrate their immortality".

== Presenters ==
- Ed Koch – proclaimed that Radio City Music Hall would be renamed "Video City Music Hall" for the night before introducing hosts Bette Midler and Dan Aykroyd
- Cyndi Lauper – read the eligibility and voting rules in gibberish described as similar to "ancient Babylonian"
- Roger Daltrey – smashed a guitar onstage while presenting the award for Best Overall Performance in a Video
- Grace Slick and Mickey Thomas – presented Best New Artist in a Video
- Ronnie Wood – presented Best Stage Performance in a Video
- Daryl Hall and John Oates – introduced the winners of the professional categories
- Peter Wolf – presented Best Choreography in a Video (with ballerina Cynthia Gregory)
- Dale Bozzio – presented Most Experimental Video
- Ric Ocasek – presented Best Group Video
- Mick Jagger – introduced the Video Vanguard award and its presenters, the Police, via pre-recorded video message
- Andy Summers and Stewart Copeland – presented Video Vanguard to the Beatles and Richard Lester
- Herbie Hancock – presented Video Vanguard to David Bowie
- John Landis – presented Best Direction in a Video
- Rod Stewart and Ronnie Wood – presented the Special Recognition Award to Quincy Jones
- Fee Waybill – presented Best Concept Video
- Billy Idol – presented Viewer's Choice
- Simon Le Bon and Nick Rhodes – presented Best Female Video
- Belinda Carlisle and Kathy Valentine – presented Best Male Video
- Eddie Murphy and Joe Piscopo – presented Video of the Year

== Winners and nominees ==
Winners are listed first and highlighted in bold.

Video of the Year	Best Male Video
**The Cars – "You Might Think"**; Herbie Hancock – "Rockit"; Michael Jackson – "Thriller"; Cyndi Lauper – "Girls Just Want to Have Fun"; The Police – "Every Breath You Take"	**David Bowie – "China Girl"**; Herbie Hancock – "Rockit"; Michael Jackson – "Thriller"; Billy Joel – "Uptown Girl"; Lionel Richie – "All Night Long (All Night)"
Best Female Video	Best Group Video
**Cyndi Lauper – "Girls Just Want to Have Fun"**; Pat Benatar – "Love Is a Battlefield"; Cyndi Lauper – "Time After Time"; Bette Midler – "Beast of Burden"; Donna Summer – "She Works Hard for the Money"	**ZZ Top – "Legs"**; Huey Lewis and the News – "The Heart of Rock & Roll"; The Police – "Every Breath You Take"; Van Halen – "Jump"; ZZ Top – "Sharp Dressed Man"
Best New Artist in a Video	Best Concept Video
**Eurythmics – "Sweet Dreams (Are Made of This)"**; Cyndi Lauper – "Girls Just Want to Have Fun"; Cyndi Lauper – "Time After Time"; Madonna – "Borderline"; Wang Chung – "Dance Hall Days"	**Herbie Hancock – "Rockit"**; The Cars – "You Might Think"; Michael Jackson – "Thriller"; Cyndi Lauper – "Girls Just Want to Have Fun"; The Rolling Stones – "Undercover of the Night"
Most Experimental Video	Best Stage Performance in a Video
**Herbie Hancock – "Rockit"**; The Cars – "You Might Think"; Thomas Dolby – "Hyperactive!"; The Alan Parsons Project – "Don't Answer Me"; Neil Young – "Wonderin'"	**Van Halen – "Jump"**; David Bowie – "Modern Love"; Duran Duran – "The Reflex"; Bette Midler – "Beast of Burden"; The Pretenders – "Middle of the Road"
Best Overall Performance in a Video	Best Direction in a Video
**Michael Jackson – "Thriller"**; David Bowie – "China Girl"; Cyndi Lauper – "Girls Just Want to Have Fun"; The Police – "Every Breath You Take"; Van Halen – "Jump"	**ZZ Top – "Sharp Dressed Man" (Director: Tim Newman)**; The Bongos – "Numbers with Wings" (Director: Juliano Waldman); Ian Hunter – "All of the Good Ones Are Taken" (Director: Martin Kahan); Billy Idol – "Dancing with Myself" (Director: Tobe Hooper); Cyndi Lauper – "Time After Time" (Director: Edd Griles); Huey Lewis and the News – "I Want a New Drug" (Director: David Rathod); The Police – "Every Breath You Take" (Directors: Godley & Creme); ZZ Top – "Gimme All Your Lovin'" (Director: Tim Newman)
Best Choreography in a Video	Best Special Effects in a Video
**Michael Jackson – "Thriller" (Choreographers: Michael Jackson and Michael Peters)**; Toni Basil – "Over My Head" (Choreographer: Toni Basil); Elton John – "I'm Still Standing" (Choreographer: Arlene Phillips); Bette Midler – "Beast of Burden" (Choreographer: Toni Basil); Donna Summer – "She Works Hard for the Money" (Choreographer: Arlene Phillips)	**Herbie Hancock – "Rockit" (Special Effects: Godley & Creme)**; The Cars – "You Might Think" (Special Effects: Charlex); Thomas Dolby – "Hyperactive!" (Special Effects: David Yardley); Billy Idol – "Dancing with Myself" (Special Effects: Eric Critchley); Talking Heads – "Burning Down the House" (Special Effects: David Byrne and Julia Hayward)
Best Art Direction in a Video	Best Editing in a Video
**Herbie Hancock – "Rockit" (Art Directors: Jim Whiting and Godley & Creme)**; The Cars – "You Might Think" (Art Director: Bob Ryzner); Billy Idol – "Dancing with Myself" (Art Director: Kim Colefax); The Police – "Every Breath You Take" (Art Directors: Kim Colefax and Godley & Creme); Queen – "Radio Ga Ga" (Art Director: Bryce Walmsley)	**Herbie Hancock – "Rockit" (Editors: Roo Aiken and Godley & Creme)**; Duran Duran – "The Reflex" (Editor: Steven Priest); Billy Idol – "Eyes Without a Face" (Editor: Kris Trexler); Elton John – "I'm Still Standing" (Editor: Warren Lynch); The Police – "Every Breath You Take" (Editors: Roo Aiken and Godley & Creme); ZZ Top – "Legs" (Editors: Sim Sadler and Bob Sarles); ZZ Top – "Sharp Dressed Man" (Editor: Sim Sadler)
Best Cinematography in a Video	Viewer's Choice
**The Police – "Every Breath You Take" (Director of Photography: Daniel Pearl)**; David Bowie – "China Girl" (Director of Photography: John Metcalfe); Billy Idol – "Eyes Without a Face" (Director of Photography: Tony Mitchell); Kiss – "All Hell's Breakin' Loose" (Directors of Photography: Tony Mitchell and Jim Crispi); John Cougar Mellencamp – "Authority Song" (Director of Photography: Daniel Pearl); Stray Cats – "(She's) Sexy + 17" (Director of Photography: Harry Lake)	**Michael Jackson – "Thriller"**; The Cars – "You Might Think"; Herbie Hancock – "Rockit"; Cyndi Lauper – "Girls Just Want to Have Fun"; The Police – "Every Breath You Take"
Video Vanguard Award
**The Beatles**; **David Bowie**; **Richard Lester**
Special Recognition Award
**Quincy Jones**

== Artists with multiple wins and nominations ==
Artists who received multiple awards
Wins	Artist
5	Herbie Hancock
3	Michael Jackson
2	David Bowie
2	ZZ Top

Artists who received multiple nominations
Nominations	Artist
9	Cyndi Lauper
8	Herbie Hancock
8	The Police
6	Michael Jackson
6	The Cars
6	ZZ Top
5	Billy Idol
4	David Bowie
3	Bette Midler
3	Van Halen
2	Donna Summer
2	Duran Duran
2	Elton John
2	Huey Lewis and the News
2	Thomas Dolby

== Music Videos with multiple wins and nominations ==
Music Videos that received multiple awards
Wins	Artist	Music Video
5	Herbie Hancock	"Rockit"
3	Michael Jackson	"Thriller"

Music Videos that received multiple nominations
Nominations	Artist	Music Video
8	Herbie Hancock	"Rockit"
8	The Police	"Every Breath You Take"
6	Cyndi Lauper	"Girls Just Want to Have Fun"
6	Michael Jackson	"Thriller"
6	The Cars	"You Might Think"
3	Bette Midler	"Beast of Burden"
3	Billy Idol	"Dancing with Myself"
3	Cyndi Lauper	"Time After Time"
3	David Bowie	"China Girl"
3	Van Halen	"Jump"
3	ZZ Top	"Sharp Dressed Man"
2	Billy Idol	"Eyes Without a Face"
2	Donna Summer	"She Works Hard for the Money"
2	Duran Duran	"The Reflex"
2	Elton John	"I'm Still Standing"
2	Thomas Dolby	"Hyperactive!"
2	ZZ Top	"Legs"

== Other appearances ==
- Diana Ross – accepted all three of Michael Jackson's awards on his behalf
- J. J. Jackson – appeared in a backstage segment before a commercial break
- Alan Hunter – appeared in a segment from the mezzanine after a commercial break
- John Cougar Mellencamp – interviewed by Mark Goodman from his seat before a commercial break
- David Lee Roth – interviewed by Martha Quinn from his seat before a commercial break
- Carly Simon – interviewed by Nina Blackwood backstage before a commercial break
- Iggy Pop – accepted the award for Best Male Video on behalf of David Bowie
