= Autodrive =

Single by Herbie Hancock

from the album Future Shock
- Released: 1983
- Genre: Synth-funk; synth-pop; new wave
- Length: 4:08
- Label: Columbia
- Songwriter(s): Herbie Hancock; Bill Laswell; Michael Beinhorn
- Producer(s): Herbie Hancock; Material

Herbie Hancock singles chronology
"Rockit" (1983)	"Autodrive" (1983)	"Future Shock" (1983)

"Autodrive" is a song by American jazz pianist Herbie Hancock released as a single from his twenty-ninth album, Future Shock. The song peaked at No. 26 on the US Billboard Hot Black Singles chart, No. 36 on the US Hot Dance Club Play chart, and No. 33 on the UK Pop Singles chart.

== Background ==
Autodrive was composed by Herbie Hancock, Bill Laswell and Michael Beinhorn. The song was also produced by Hancock and Material.

== Critical reception ==
Richard S. Ginell of AllMusic, in his review of Future Shock, noted "some real, honest-to-goodness jazz licks on a grand piano show up in the middle of Auto Drive." Marke Bieschike of DJ Mag, from his review of the album, wrote "The propulsive bass, chiming proto-house piano, and squiggly ornamentation of 'Autodrive' fit right into the 12" mix expansionism that was then ruling dancefloors." David Adler of All About Jazz found "tasty single-note lines on 'Autodrive'."

== Personnel ==
- Bass – Bill Laswell
- Electronic Drums, Mini-Moog Programming – Michael Beinhorn
- Engineer – Billy Youdelman, Bryan Bell, Martin Bisi, Mike Krowiak, Dominic Maita
- Mixer, Engineer – Dave Jerden
- Piano, Synthesizer, Producer – Herbie Hancock
- Producer – Material
- Associate Producer – Tony Meilandt
- Writer – Bill Laswell, Herbie Hancock, Michael Beinhorn

== Charts ==
Chart (1983)	Peak position
US Hot Black Singles (Billboard)	26
US Hot Dance Club Play (Billboard)	36
Germany (GfK Entertainment Charts)	53
Netherlands (Dutch Charts)	39
UK Singles Chart (OCC)	33
