= Future Shock (Herbie Hancock album) =

Album by Herbie Hancock

Studio album by Herbie Hancock
- Released: August 15, 1983
- Recorded: 1983
- Studio: OAO, New York City; RPM, New York City; Garage Sale, Los Angeles
- Genre: Electro-funk; instrumental hip-hop
- Length: 38:00 (original LP); 44:18 (remastered edition with bonus track)
- Label: Columbia; CK 38814
- Producer: Material, Herbie Hancock

Herbie Hancock chronology
| Lite Me Up (1982) | Future Shock (1983) | Sound-System (1984) |

Future Shock is the twenty-ninth album by American jazz pianist Herbie Hancock, released in August 1983 by Columbia Records. It was his first release from his electro-funk era and an early example of instrumental hip hop. Participating musicians include bass guitarist Bill Laswell (who co-produced), guitarist Pete Cosey and drummer Sly Dunbar.

== Background ==
Much of the album was initially composed by the team of avant-garde bassist and record producer Bill Laswell, and keyboardist and producer Michael Beinhorn, and played on tour by their group Material in 1982, as a precursor to recording the follow-up album to Material's One Down album (on which Whitney Houston was the lead singer on a cover of the Soft Machine song "Memories"). Hancock was approached to collaborate on this recording that would go towards a postmodern direction, instead of his usual jazz-fusion. The result was a hip-hop influenced album, released under Hancock's name, which combined Hancock's keyboard playing with Laswell's arrangements and Grand Mixer DXT's turntablism.

According to 1999 re-issue's liner notes, when Laswell went to buy speakers at a music equipment store he would insist on testing them by playing the demos of "Rockit" and "Earth Beat". While those songs were played through the speakers, passing by customers apparently liked what they heard and danced to the music. Soon after Laswell let Hancock know about the incident, eventually telling him – "We got something good here."

Future Shock is the title name from Hancock's remake of the Curtis Mayfield song from ten years earlier, also featured here.

"Rockit", the album's big hit, was accompanied by one of the most successful music videos of the era. The video, directed by Godley and Creme of 10cc fame, featured dancing robots made by Jim Whiting, moving around to the beat of the music and the turntable scratching. Hancock won several MTV Music Video awards in 1984, as well as the Grammy award for best R&B performance.

The album's cover art was derived from "Approach", a work created by David Em.

== Reception ==
Professional ratings
Review scores
| Source | Rating |
|---|---|
| AllMusic | 3.5/5 stars |
| Robert Christgau | B+ |
| The Penguin Guide to Jazz Recordings | 3/4 stars |
| People | (favourable) |
| PopMatters | 4/5 stars |
| Rolling Stone | 2/5 stars |
| The Rolling Stone Jazz Record Guide | 2/5 stars |

Giving the album a B+ rating, Robert Christgau commented that "As a guy who likes his funk obvious, I think those who esteem "Rockit" as highly as Head Hunters are too kind to Head Hunters. Small thanks to Herbie, lots to Material and Grand Mixer D.ST, it's the best novelty instrumental in years and the best pop of Hancock's life. Elsewhere various bright ideas, such as Pete Cosey, are obscured by the usual aura of set-piece dink — jumpy enough and often fun, but fusoid nevertheless." Richard S. Ginell of AllMusic wrote how "Herbie Hancock completely overhauled his sound and conquered MTV with his most radical step forward since the sextet days. He brought in Bill Laswell of Material as producer, along with Grand Mixer D.ST on turntables—and the immediate result was "Rockit," which makes quite a post-industrial metallic racket. Frankly, the whole record is an enigma; for all of its dehumanized, mechanized textures and rigid rhythms, it has a vitality and sense of humor that make it difficult to turn off. Moreover, Herbie can't help but inject a subversive funk element when he comps along to the techno beat—and yes, some real, honest-to-goodness jazz licks on a grand piano show up in the middle of "Auto Drive."

== Track listing ==
All tracks written by Herbie Hancock, Michael Beinhorn and Bill Laswell, except where noted.

1. "Rockit" – 5:25
2. "Future Shock" (featuring Dwight Jackson, Jr.) (Curtis Mayfield) – 8:05
3. "TFS" – 5:47
4. "Earth Beat" – 5:13
5. "Autodrive" – 6:27
6. "Rough" (featuring Lamar Wright) – 6:58

Remastered CD Bonus Tracks

7. "Rockit (Mega Mix)" – 6:18

== Personnel ==
Musicians

- Herbie Hancock – piano, synthesizer, Fairlight CMI, keyboards
- Bill Laswell – electric bass
- D.ST. – turntables, "FX"
- Pete Cosey – electric guitar
- Michael Beinhorn – keyboards
- Daniel Poncé – percussion
- Sly Dunbar – drums, percussion
- Dwight Jackson Jr. – lead vocals on "Future Shock"
- Lamar Wright – lead vocals on "Rough"
- Bernard Fowler, D.S.T., Roger Trilling, Nicky Skopelitis – backing vocals

Production

- Material – producer
- Herbie Hancock – producer
- Tony Meilandt – associate producer
- Billy Youdelman – engineer at Garage Sale Recording
- Bryan Bell – engineer at Garage Sale Recording
- Dave Jerden – engineer at Garage Sale Recording
- Dominick Maita – engineer at RPM
- Mike Krowiak – assistant engineer at RPM
- Martin Bisi – engineer at OAO
- Dave Jerden – mixing
- Howie Weinberg – mastering
- David Em – artwork

== Charts ==
| Charts | Peak position |
|---|---|
| United Kingdom (Official Charts) | 27 |
| Australia (Kent Music Report) | 79 |

== Certifications ==
| Certifications | Peak position |
|---|---|
| United States (RIAA) | Platinum |
