= Live at 25 =

Live album by Huey Lewis and the News
- Released: May 17, 2005
- Recorded: December 14–15, 2004
- Venues: Sierra Nevada Brewing Company (Chico, CA)
- Genre: Rock
- Length: 85:09 (DVD)
- Label: Rhino
- Producers: Huey Lewis; Johnny Colla

Huey Lewis and the News chronology
Plan B (2001)	Live at 25 (2005)	Greatest Hits & Videos (2006)

Live at 25 is a live album by Huey Lewis and the News celebrating the 25-year anniversary since the band's formation in 1979. The performance was recorded in December 2004 at the Sierra Nevada Brewing Company in Chico, California. The album was released along with a separate DVD in 2005 by Rhino Records. This was the last album the band made with saxophonist Ron Stallings, who died in 2009.

== Reception ==
Professional ratings
Review scores
Source	Rating
AllMusic	(CD)
AllMusic	(DVD)

Stephen Thomas Erlewine of AllMusic says Live at 25 "is designed to be less a historical document than a nostalgic souvenir for longtime fans, capturing the group at a quarter-century mark." He believes "the song selection is good, the band sounds tight and professional, the production is clean and punchy, and while it's never especially engaging, it is an enjoyable performance."

== Track listing ==
Track listings and personnel adapted from the album and DVD's liner notes.

=== CD ===
1. "The Heart of Rock & Roll" (Huey Lewis, Johnny Colla) – 5:02
2. "So Little Kindness" (Chris Hayes, Huey Lewis, Rob Sudduth) – 4:48
3. "Thank You #19" (Huey Lewis, Sean Hopper) – 5:45
4. "I Want a New Drug" / "Small World" (Chris Hayes, Huey Lewis) – 8:40
5. "If This Is It" (Huey Lewis, Johnny Colla) – 3:50
6. "Power of Love" (Chris Hayes, Huey Lewis, Johnny Colla) – 5:22
7. "Do You Believe in Love" (Robert John Lange) – 4:29
8. "Some of My Lies Are True (Sooner or Later)" (Bill Gibson, Chris Hayes, Huey Lewis, Johnny Colla, Mario Cipollina, Sean Hopper) – 4:02
9. "It's All Right" (Curtis Mayfield) – 3:36
10. "Bad Is Bad" (Alex Call, Huey Lewis, John McFee, Johnny Ciambotti, Michael Schriener, Sean Hopper) – 4:01
11. "Heart and Soul" (Mike Chapman, Nicky Chinn) – 4:32
12. "But It's Alright" (J.J. Jackson, Pierre Tubbs) - 3:34
13. "(Too) Hip to Be Square" (Bill Gibson, Huey Lewis, Sean Hopper) – 4:07
14. "We're Not Here for a Long Time (We're Here for a Good Time)" (Chris Hayes, Huey Lewis, Johnny Colla) – 4:55
15. "Back in Time" (Chris Hayes, Huey Lewis, Johnny Colla, Sean Hopper) - 3:42
16. "Doing It All for My Baby" (Mike Duke, Phil Cody) – 4:20

=== DVD ===
1. "The Heart of Rock & Roll"
2. "So Little Kindness"
3. "Thank You #19"
4. "I Want a New Drug" / "Small World"
5. "If This Is It"
6. "Power of Love"
7. "Do You Believe in Love"
8. "Some of My Lies Are True (Sooner or Later)"
9. "It's All Right"
10. "Bad Is Bad"
11. "Um, Um, Um, Um, Um, Um"
12. "Heart and Soul"
13. "But It's Alright"
14. "(Too) Hip to Be Square"
15. "We're Not Here for a Long Time (We're Here for a Good Time)"
16. "Back in Time"
17. "Doing It All for My Baby"
18. "Working for a Living"

Special features

19. "The Rhythm Ranch" (with commentary by Huey Lewis)
20. "Trouble in Paradise" (from the Heart of Rock 'N' Roll Show, 1985)
21. "Stuck with You" (from the All the Way Live Show, 1987)
22. "Buzz Buzz Buzz" (from American Bandstand 1982) (John Gray, Bobby Day)

== Personnel ==
- Huey Lewis – lead vocals, harmonica
- Johnny Colla – guitar, saxophone, vocals
- Bill Gibson – drums, vocals
- Sean Hopper – keyboards, vocals
- John Pierce – bass
- Stef Burns – guitar, vocals
- Bill Hinds – guitar, vocals
- Marvin McFadden – trumpet
- Ron Stallings – tenor saxophone
- Rob Sudduth – tenor and baritone saxophones
