= Griles =

Griles is a surname. Notable people with the surname include:

- Edd Griles (1945–2024), American music video director
- J. Steven Griles (born 1947), American lobbyist
