= Rockit (instrumental) =

1983 single by Herbie Hancock

Single by Herbie Hancock

from the album Future Shock
- B-side: Album version (US 7"); "Rough" (UK 7")
- Released: July 1983
- Studio: O.A.O./BC Studio, Gowanus (Brooklyn); RPM Studios (New York City); Hancock's home studio (West Hollywood); Eldorado Studios (Los Angeles)
- Genre: Synth-funk; synth-pop; new wave
- Length: 5:25 (album version); 3:54 (US single version); 3:37 (UK & Europe single version); 3:22 (video version)
- Label: Columbia
- Songwriters: Herbie Hancock; Bill Laswell; Michael Beinhorn
- Producers: Bill Laswell; Michael Beinhorn

Herbie Hancock singles chronology
"Gettin' to the Good Part" (1982)	"Rockit" (1983)	"Autodrive" (1983)

Music video
- "Rockit" on YouTube

"Rockit" is a composition recorded by American jazz pianist Herbie Hancock and produced by Bill Laswell and Michael Beinhorn. Hancock released it as a single from his twenty-ninth album, Future Shock (1983). The selection was composed by Hancock, Laswell, and Beinhorn.

The track was driven by its deejay scratch style, performed primarily by DXT, and its music video created by Godley & Creme, featuring the robotic art of Jim Whiting, which was put in high rotation on MTV. "Rockit" won a Grammy Award for Best R&B Instrumental Performance in 1983, and it won five MTV Video Music Awards in 1984. In 2022 and 2025, Rolling Stone and Billboard magazine included the song in their lists of the best dance songs of all time.

== Recording ==
"Rockit" was constructed and composed during the recording process, first at BC Studio in Gowanus, Brooklyn, with additional overdubs at RPM Studios in Manhattan, then Hancock's home studio in West Hollywood, and finally at Eldorado studio in Hollywood, Los Angeles. The production duo of Material (bassist Bill Laswell and synth player Michael Beinhorn) were based at Martin Bisi's BC Studio, recording experimental, no wave and underground club music. Hancock's 25-year-old manager, Tony Meilandt, approached Laswell to write a new track for Hancock, whose career needed a boost. To gauge this potential new direction for his career, Hancock accompanied Laswell to hear a set of popular club DJs including Afrika Bambaataa and D.ST spin at Roxy NYC in front of an enthusiastic crowd. Warily eyeing the crowd, which to him looked like a riot, Hancock needed more convincing by Meilandt before he contracted with Laswell's team to deliver two tracks. Meilandt later said "Herbie was very much ready" to try a new kind of sound.

At BC Studios, Beinhorn used a new Oberheim DMX drum machine to lay down a basic beat, and Laswell brought in Daniel Ponce to augment this with Afro-Cuban batá drums. Ponce played the three drums one at a time during three recording passes, to make it sound like three drummers invoking a Santería spirit. Grand Mixer D.ST came to the studio with two deejay friends from his group Infinity Rappers to scratch for the track, bringing his own vinyl which included "Change the Beat" by Fab Five Freddy, (which had been recorded in the same studio). D.ST found an interesting portion of the 12-inch vinyl near the end – the voice of manager Roger Trilling saying "Ahhh! This stuff is really fresh" through the studio's vocoder – and he scratched through that section. Trilling had been playing with the vocoder in the studio, mocking Elektra Records executive Bruce Lundvall who was in the habit of sitting back in his chair and declaring a song "fresh" if he liked it, without knowing that the word fresh was current in hip-hop subculture. This moment was captured on tape, and Laswell worked it into the conclusion of "Change the Beat".

The 2-inch 16-track master tape containing rhythm parts and scratching needed to be transferred to 24-track 2-inch in order for Hancock to work with it at his home studio. Laswell and Bisi took the tape to RPM Studios in Greenwich Village, but instead of simply transferring the format, they added some extra sounds, especially a stab of guitar taken from a Led Zeppelin song on the album Coda. Using the repeat hold function of a Lexicon Prime Time digital delay, they attempted to capture a Led Zeppelin snare drum sound, but a moment of inattention resulted in the guitar stab, which Laswell found better suited his purpose.

Hancock first heard the work-in-progress in West Hollywood at his home studio, a former guest house in back of his main residence. Hancock determined that the track needed a melody line. Hancock, Laswell and Beinhorn composed one on the spot by humming out loud to each other. Then Hancock recorded his ideas on three different synthesizers, performing on them one at a time. When Hancock suggested performing some vocoder vocal scat, Laswell and Beinhorn said they could instead sample lyrics from a hit song, specifically the line "Rock it, don't stop it" from "Planet Rock", which was at that time a hit for Afrika Bambaataa and the Soul Sonic Force. This lyric sample produced the title "Rockit".

A final recording session was convened at Eldorado Studios located at Hollywood and Vine, Hollywood, Los Angeles. To round out the turntablist sounds, D.ST flew out from New York along with his colleague Grandmaster Caz. Session engineer Dave Jerden remarked to Beinhorn that Hancock appeared hopeful about the track, but that he did not realize what he had. After the brief 90-minute session, the New York contingent went to a local stereo shop to pass the time before their flight home. Carrying a cassette tape of the final mix, they listened to "Rockit" on some loudspeakers at the shop, attracting the attention of children from the neighborhood who were amazed and curious. Judging their reaction, Laswell told D.ST, "That's a hit record."

== Personnel ==
- Herbie Hancock – synthesizers, composition
- Bill Laswell – samples, production, composition
- Michael Beinhorn – Oberheim DMX synth drums, Minimoog percussion, processed vocal, additional electronics, composition
- Daniel Ponce – batá drums
- D.ST – main turntables
- Mr. C of the Infinity Rappers – additional turntables
- Boo-Ski of the Infinity Rappers – additional turntables
- Martin Bisi – engineering at BC Studio and RPM Studios
- Grandmaster Caz – additional turntables
- Dave Jerden – engineering, mix at Eldorado Studios

== Music video ==
The music video for "Rockit", directed by the duo of Kevin Godley and Lol Creme, featured robot-like movable sculptures (by Jim Whiting) dancing, spinning, and even walking in time to the music in a "virtual house" in London, England. The opening shot of the house is a still photograph of Ganley Court, a residential block on the Winstanley Estate in Battersea, London.

The video garnered five MTV Video Music Awards in 1984, including Best Concept Video and Best Special Effects. Hancock himself appears, and plays keyboard, only as an image on a television receiver, which is smashed on the pavement outside the front door of the house at the end of the video. The video also won two Billboard Video Music Awards, one for most innovative video, and another for best art direction.

== Performances ==
"Rockit" was performed at the 1985 Grammy Awards Ceremony in Los Angeles, California, in a synthesizer jam with contemporaries Howard Jones, Thomas Dolby, and Stevie Wonder.

== Legacy ==
In July 2022, Rolling Stone ranked "Rockit" number 131 in their list of the "200 Greatest Dance Songs of All Time". In March 2025, Billboard magazine ranked it number 39 in their list of "The 100 Best Dance Songs of All Time".

== Charts ==
=== Weekly charts ===
Chart (1983)	Peak position
Australia (Kent Music Report)	72
Austria (Ö3 Austria Top 40)	7
Belgium (Ultratop 50 Flanders)	4
France (IFOP)	9
Ireland (IRMA)	13
Netherlands (Dutch Top 40)	8
Netherlands (Single Top 100)	7
New Zealand (Recorded Music NZ)	7
Sweden (Sverigetopplistan)	10
Switzerland (Schweizer Hitparade)	4
UK Singles (Official Charts)	8
US Billboard Hot 100	71
US Hot Black Singles (Billboard)	6
US Hot Dance Club Play (Billboard)	1
US Cash Box Top 100	64
West Germany (GfK)	6

Chart (1984)	Peak position
Australia (Kent Music Report)	16
Canada Top Singles (RPM)	9

=== Year-end charts ===
Chart (1983)	Position
Belgium (Ultratop 50 Flanders)	67

Chart (1984)	Position
Australia (Kent Music Report)	71
Canada Top Singles (RPM)	77
France (IFOP)	48

== Certifications ==
Certifications and sales for "Rockit"
Region	Certification	Certified units/sales
Canada (Music Canada)	Gold	50,000^{^}
United States (RIAA)	Gold	500,000^{^}
^{^} Shipments figures based on certification alone.

== See also ==
- List of number-one dance singles of 1983 (U.S.)
