= Grand Mixer DXT =

American DJ

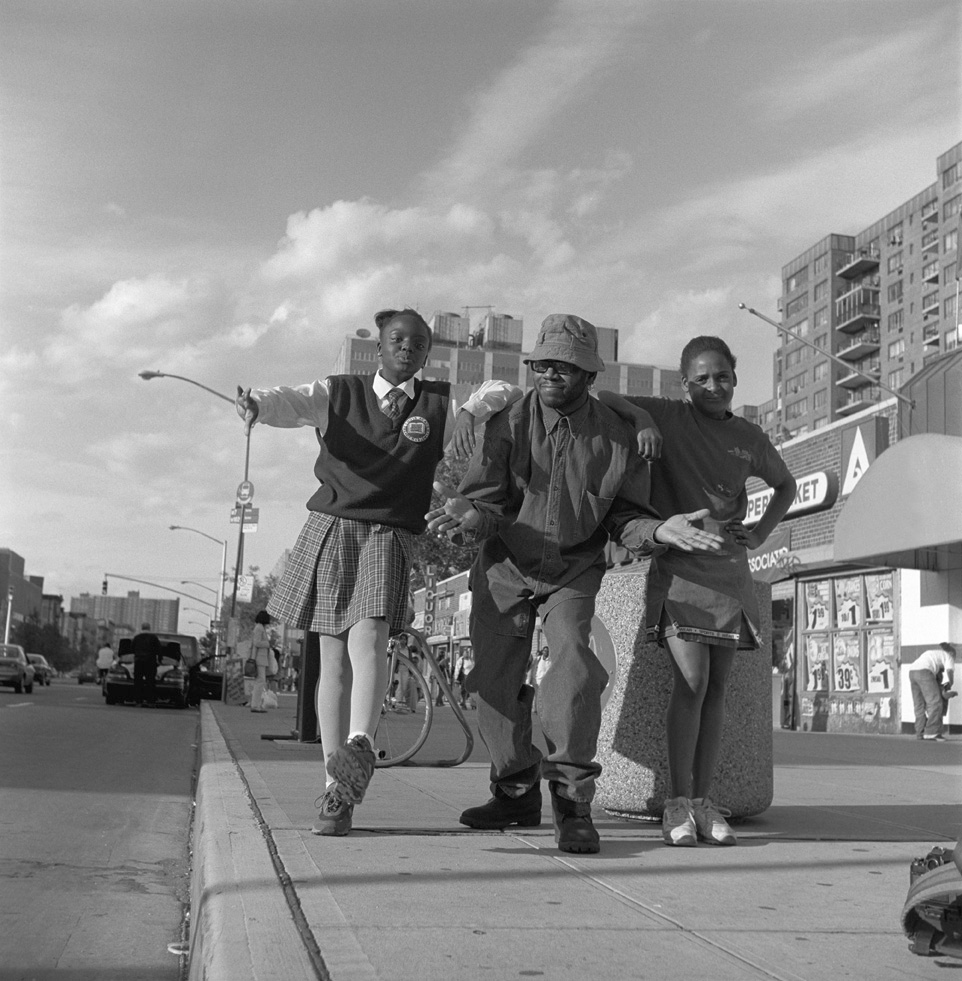
- Grand Mixer DXT in Harlem, New York 1998

Background information
- Also known as: GrandMixer D.ST
- Born: Derek Showard
- Origin: New York City, New York, United States
- Genres: Hip hop; electro; jazz; funk; rock
- Occupations: Musician DJ, producer
- Instruments: Turntables, drums, keyboards, vocals, samples

Derek Showard, better known by the stage name GrandMixer DXT, is an American musician, and the first DJ to use the turntable as a musical instrument.

Early in his career, he was known as Grand Mixer D.ST, a reference to Delancey Street on the Lower East Side of Manhattan, New York City. He was featured in the influential hip hop film Wild Style. Recognized as a pioneer, Grand Mixer DXT is credited as being the first turntablist. He was the first person to establish the turntable as a fully performable and improvisational musical instrument (Alberts 2002). He created the technique of altering the pitch of the note or sound on the record.

He is also credited with helping popularize DJing through his scratching on Herbie Hancock's single "Rockit", from the Bill Laswell and Material produced album Future Shock. He is also featured in the 2001 documentary, Scratch.

== Discography ==
=== Albums ===
With Ginger Baker

- Horses & Trees (Celluloid, 1986)

With Herbie Hancock

- Future Shock (Columbia, 1983)
- Sound System (Columbia, 1984)
- Perfect Machine (Columbia, 1988)

With Jah Wobble

- Heaven and Earth (Island Records, 1995)

With King T

- IV Life (MCA, 1994)

With Bill Laswell

- Akasha (Subharmonic, 1995)
- Jazzonia (Douglas, 1998)
- Aftermathematics (Subharmonic, 2003)

With Praxis

- Profanation (Preparation for a Coming Darkness) (NAGUAL, 2008)

With Sly and Robbie

- Rhythm Killers (Island Records, 1987)

=== Singles ===
D.ST: The Home Of Hip Hop (Celluloid, 1985)
