= Swarovski Kristallwelten =

Museum in Austria

Coordinates: 47.2939°N 11.6008°E

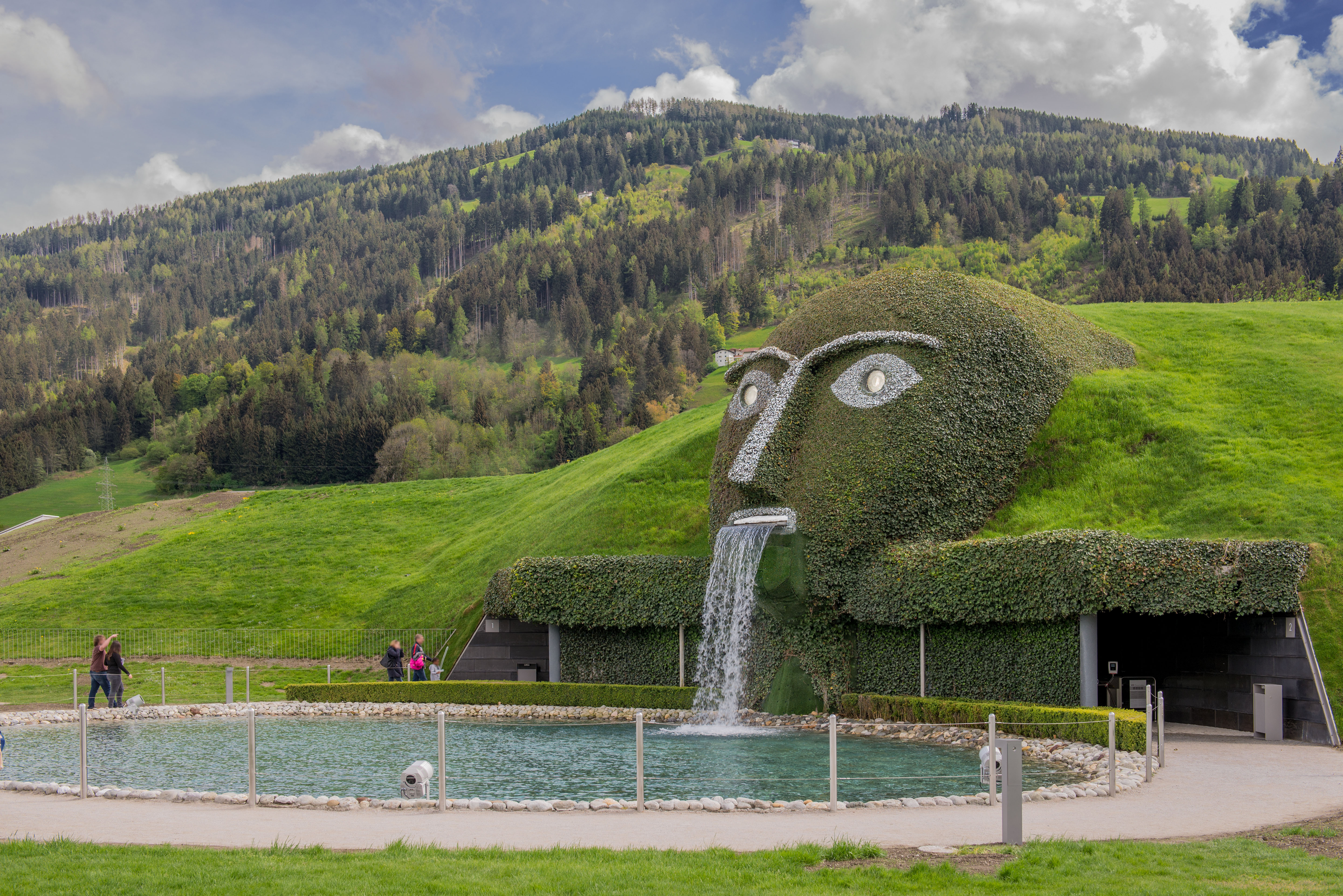
The Giant at entrance to Swarovski Crystal Worlds

Swarovski Kristallwelten (Crystal Worlds) is an experience attraction created by André Heller for the crystal glass manufacturer Swarovski, consisting of a park, art museum, retail area, and restaurant. It opened in 1995 and is located in the Austrian Tyrol, in the town of Wattens, Innsbruck-Land District, where the company was founded and still has its headquarters today. Kristallwelten, together with the Swarovski Kristallwelten Store in Innsbruck and Vienna, form D. Swarovski Tourism Services GmbH.

== History ==
Swarovski was founded by Daniel Swarovski in 1895. One century later, multimedia artist Andre Heller was commissioned to design the museum with 14 "chambers of wonder" in the form of a giant to celebrate the 100th anniversary of D. Swarovski KG. After the initial opening in 1995, further expansion and renovation projects followed in 1998, 2003, and 2007.

=== Expansion in 2014–15 ===
In October 2014, the renovation and expansion of Swarovski Kristallwelten began, at a cost of around €34 million, to celebrate the 120th anniversary of Swarovski, and the 20th anniversary of Swarovski Kristallwelten itself. It reopened on 30 April 2015. The overall area of the attraction was extended from 3.5 hectares (8.6 acres) to 7.5 hectares (19 acres). New features added to the garden included a "Crystal Cloud", a play tower, and a restaurant called Daniels Kristallwelten.

During construction, wall remains dating back to Roman times were discovered, together with a cache of coins. The wall remains were from a Roman country estate or a small settlement on the Roman road leading through the Lower Inn Valley, and the 702 Roman silver coins are known as Antoninians.

== Attractions ==
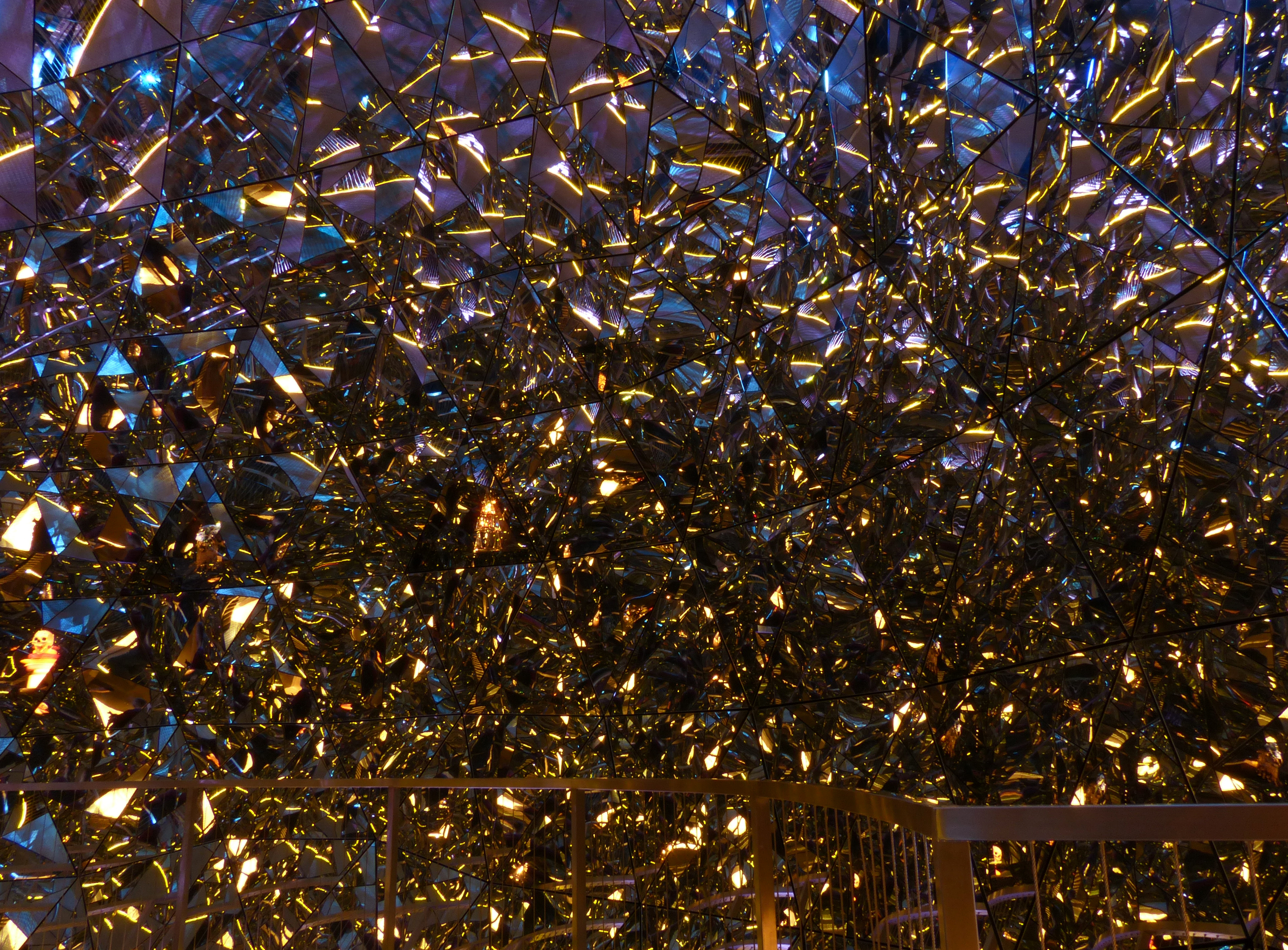
Crystal Dome

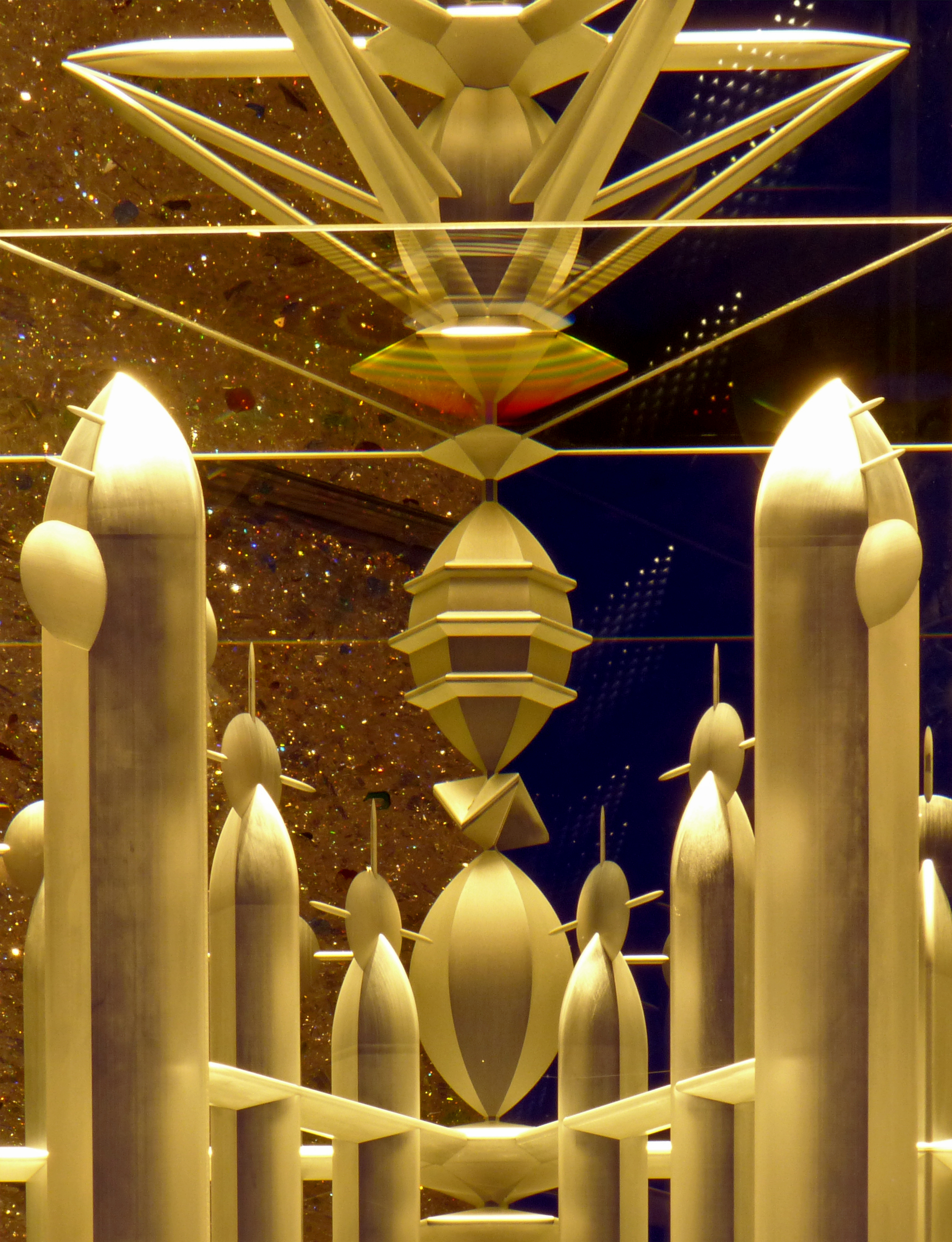
Ice Passage

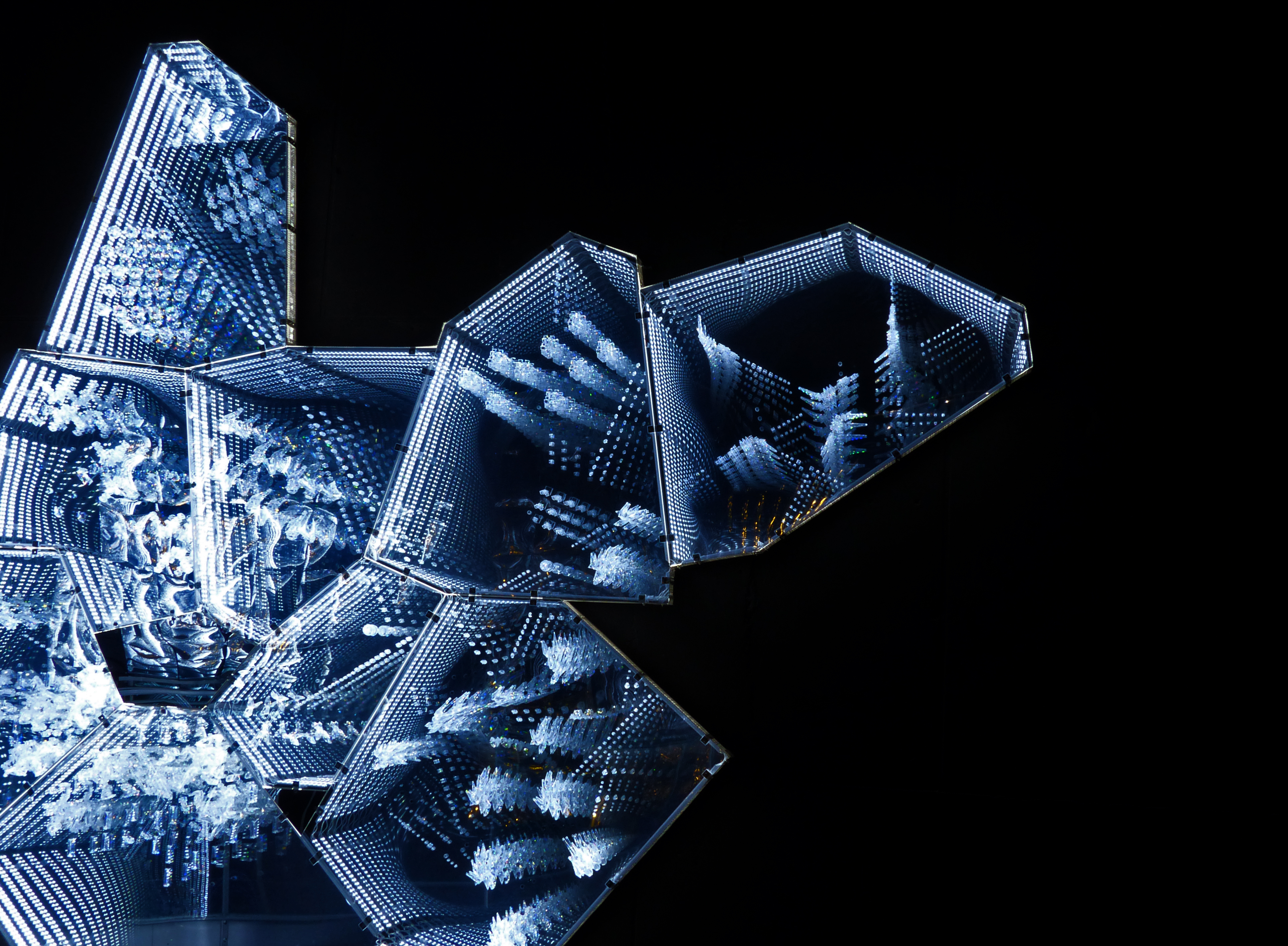
Into Lattice Sun

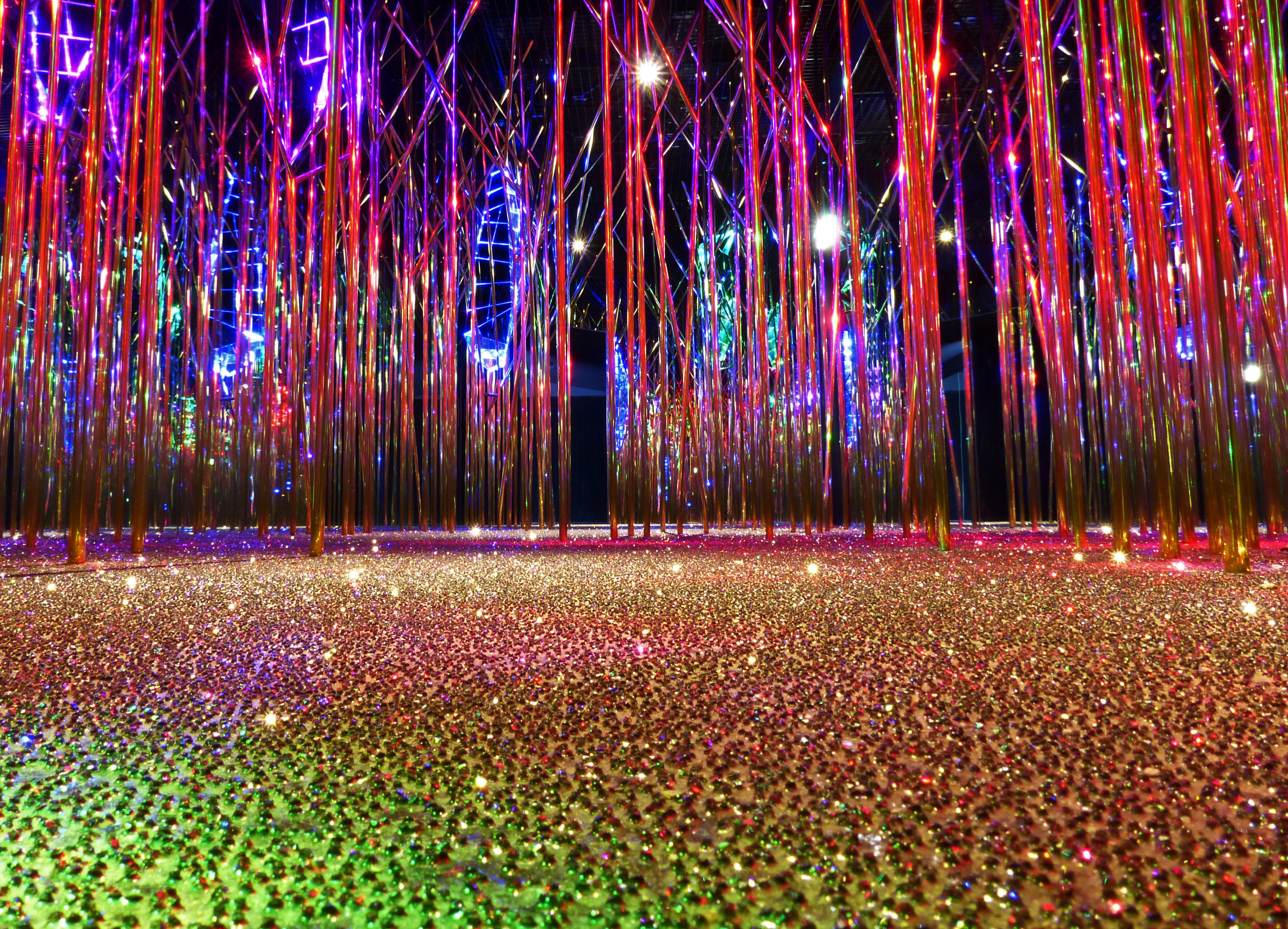
Eden

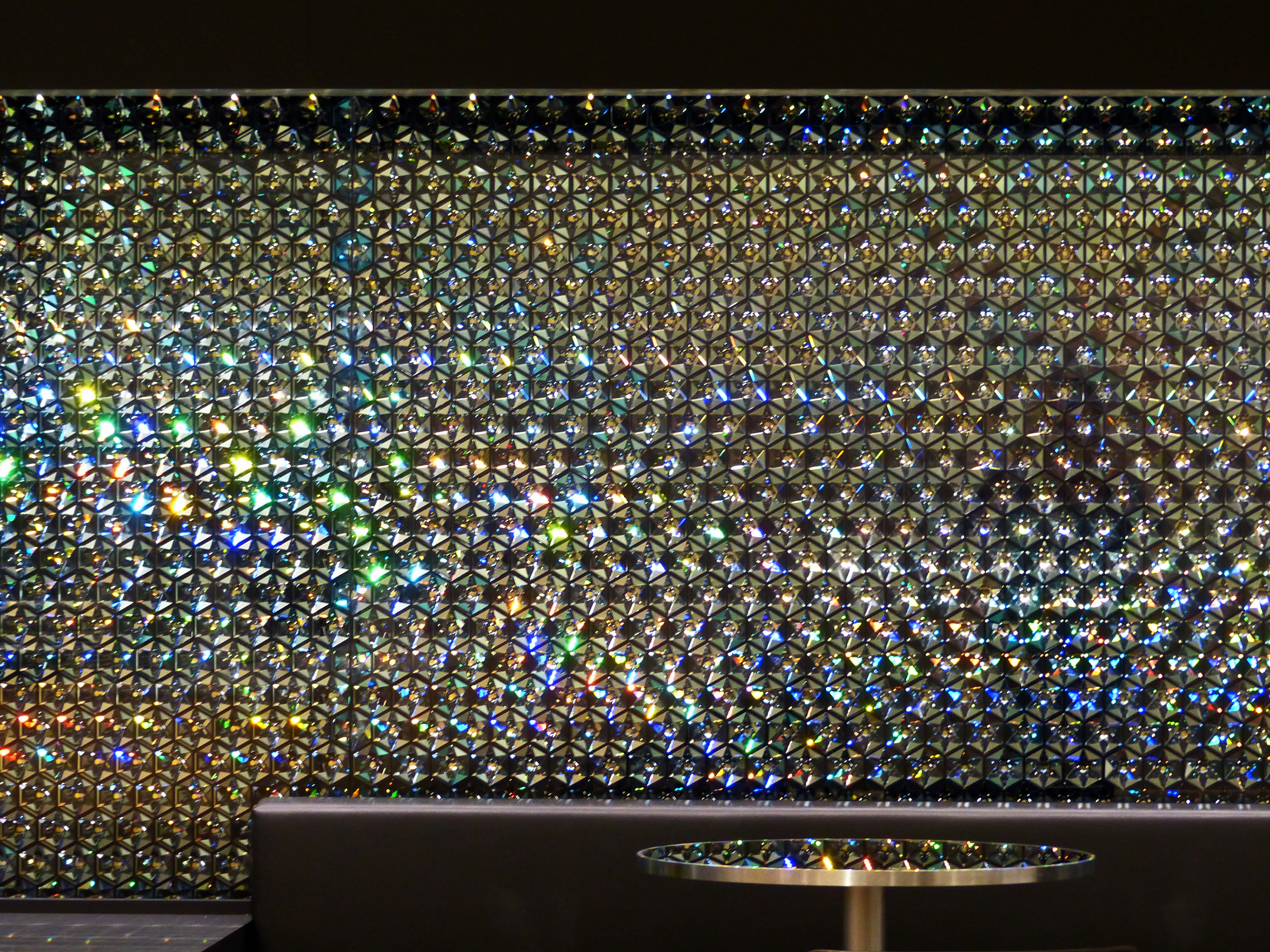
Swarovski Store

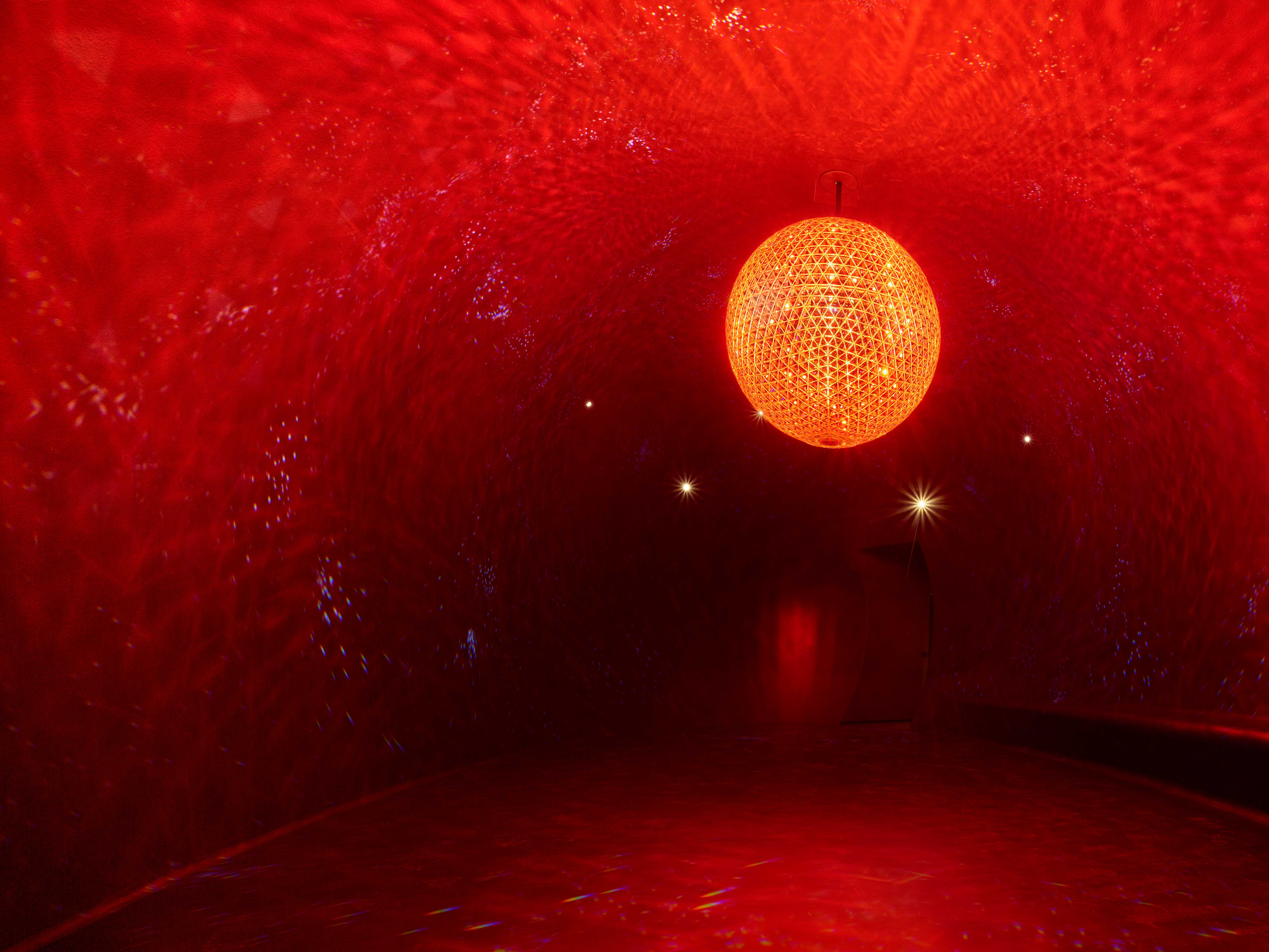
El Sol
- 18 "Chambers of Wonder"
- Swarovski store
- Gardens
- "Crystal Cloud"
- Play tower and open-air playground
- Carousel
- Daniels Kristallwelten, restaurant

=== Chambers of Wonder ===
Inside the giant there are exhibition spaces, based on the concept of the historic chambers of art and curiosities favored by aristocratic families in the 16th century. In the "Chambers of Wonder", artists, designers, and architects, such as Brian Eno, Tord Boontje, Niki de Saint Phalle, Jim Whiting, Keith Haring, Andy Warhol, Salvador Dalí, and Yayoi Kusama, have interpreted crystal in their own ways. Eighteen showrooms were created, each of which has a different thematic focus.

=== Garden ===
The garden contains contemporary art as well as ancient history on 7.5 hectares (19 acres) of land surrounding the iconic Giant, with art installations and structures.

=== Carousel ===
Spanish designer Jaime Hayon designed a black-and-white carousel meant to juxtapose with the greenery of the garden. The monochrome design is made of 15 million Swarovski crystals across 12 ceiling panels and 16 wall panels, and is illuminated with warm lighting.

=== Crystal Cloud ===
The Crystal Cloud, created by Andy Cao and Xavier Perrot, has a surface of around 1,400 square metres (15,000 sq ft), the largest work of its kind in the world. The Crystal Cloud consists of around 800,000 hand-mounted Swarovski crystals. The installation drifts above the black Mirror Pool.

=== Play tower ===
The play tower features four different levels arranged on top of each other. The levels are connected by a unique vertical net that can be climbed up to a height of just over 14 meters (46 ft). The facades of the tower, designed by architecture firm Snøhetta, consist of 160 crystalline facets, though no two are exactly alike.

=== Labyrinth ===
A green labyrinth in the form of a hand by André Heller invites visitors to explore and play hide-and-seek.

=== Events ===
In 2019, "Music in the Giant", a festival of chamber music under the artistic direction of Thomas Larcher, took place for the 15th time. Other events include family days, workshops for children and young people, and culinary events.

== Visitors ==
In 2011, Swarovski Kristallwelten was ranked eighth amongst tourist attractions in Austria, with 680,000 visitors. Analyzed by country of origin, in 2009 the majority of visitors came from Germany (26%), followed by Austria (13%), Italy (11%), India (8%), and China (5%). In 2019, the total number of visitors to Swarovski Kristallwelten reached 15 million.
