= The Cleansing (John Zorn and Bill Laswell album) =

2022 improvisation jazz studio album by John Zorn and Bill Laswell

Studio album by John Zorn and Bill Laswell
- Released: January 21, 2022
- Recorded: April 9, 2021
- Genre: Avant-garde, free improvisation
- Length: 46:39
- Label: Tzadik
- Producer: John Zorn

John Zorn chronology
John Zorn's Bagatelles (Vol. 5-8) (2021)	The Cleansing (2022)	Perchance to Dream (2022)

Bill Laswell chronology
Sacred Ceremonies (2021)	The Cleansing (2022)	Nammu (2022)

The Cleansing is a studio album by John Zorn and Bill Laswell. It is the first collaborative album by the duo and was recorded in shortly after the COVID-19 lockdowns ended in 2021 and released by Tzadik Records in January 2022. The album consists of improvised music by Zorn and Laswell that was recorded in the studio in real time with no edits or overdubs.

== Reception ==
Professional ratings
Review scores
Source	Rating
All About Jazz	3.5/5 stars

All About Jazz said:

The resulting music is raw, gestural. Despite the all improv setting, there is a sense of narrative and of forward motion. From the very start, it is evident that the duo has developed a deep musical understanding of each other. The way they interact indicates that they are listening to one another and responding.

— Georgievski, N.

== Track listing ==
All pieces are real time improvisations

1. "Brion Gysin" – 10:04
2. "Aleister Crowley" – 6:52
3. "Austin Osman Spare" – 6:47
4. "William Burroughs" – 10:19
5. "Alejandro Jodorowsky" — 8:56
6. "The Cleansing" — 3:41

== Personnel ==
- John Zorn – alto saxophone
- Bill Laswell – bass

== Sound ==
- Scott Hull – mastering
- James Dellatacoma – recording and mix
- John Zorn and Kazunori Sugiyama – producers
