= Plan B (Huey Lewis and the News album) =

Studio album by Huey Lewis and the News
- Released: July 24, 2001
- Studios: Way Out West Recording (San Rafael, CA); The Site (San Rafael, CA)
- Genres: Rock, pop rock
- Length: 48:16
- Label: Silvertone Records
- Producers: Huey Lewis; Johnny Colla

Huey Lewis and the News chronology
Time Flies... The Best of Huey Lewis & the News (1996)	Plan B (2001)	Live at 25 (2005)

Singles from Plan B
- 1. "Let Her Go and Start Over" Released: 2001; 2. "I'm Not in Love Yet" Released: 2001

Professional ratings
Review scores
Source	Rating
AllMusic	4/5 stars

Plan B is the eighth studio album by American rock band Huey Lewis and the News, released in 2001.

This was the last album to feature founding member/guitarist Chris Hayes, who performed on the album but then left after work was completed. It was also the last News album for Ron Stallings, who died in 2009.

== Track listing ==
1. "We're Not Here for a Long Time (We're Here for a Good Time)" (Johnny Colla, Chris Hayes, Huey Lewis) – 3:53
2. "My Other Woman" (Colla, Lewis) – 4:06
3. "I Ain't Perfect" (Bill Gibson, Lewis) – 4:33
4. "When I Write the Book" (cover of Rockpile) (Billy Bremner, Dave Edmunds, Nick Lowe) – 3:44
5. "I'm Not in Love Yet" (Duet with Wynonna) (Hayes, Lewis) – 4:28
6. "Thank You, No. 19" (Sean Hopper, Lewis) – 4:52
7. "Plan B" (Colla, Lewis) – 3:27
8. "The Rhythm Ranch" (Colla, Lewis) – 4:49
9. "Let Her Go and Start Over" (Mike Duke) – 4:47
10. "I Never Think About You" (Hayes, Lewis, John Pierce) – 5:16
11. "So Little Kindness" (Hayes, Lewis, Rob Sudduth) – 4:21
  - Re-recording; original version on Time Flies

=== Bonus track (Japan release) ===
"Plan B" (Live)

== Personnel ==
Huey Lewis and the News

- Huey Lewis – harmonica, lead vocals
- Johnny Colla – rhythm guitar, saxophone, backing vocals
- Bill Gibson – drums
- Chris Hayes – lead guitar, backing vocals
- Sean Hopper – keyboards, piano, backing vocals
- John Pierce – bass

The Sports Section

- Marvin McFadden – trumpet, additional vocals on "Plan B"
- Ron Stallings – tenor saxophone, additional vocals on "Plan B"
- Rob Sudduth – baritone saxophone, tenor saxophone

Additional musicians

- Wynonna Judd – vocals on "I'm Not in Love Yet"
- Jack Jacobsen – organ on "I Never Think About You," acoustic piano on "We're Not Here for a Long Time"
- Jim Pugh – organ on "Let Her Go and Start Over"
- Dallis Craft – backing vocals on "The Rhythm Ranch"
- Ric Wilson – rhythm guitar on "The Rhythm Ranch"

Technical personnel

- Producers – Huey Lewis and Johnny Colla
- Engineers – David Boucher, Johnny Colla, Huey Lewis, Merrit Pelkey and Jim "Watts" Vereecke.
- Mixed by Bob Clearmountain
- Digital Editing – Chris Haggerty
- Mastered by Robert Hadley and Doug Sax at The Mastering Lab (Hollywood, California).
- Photography – Aaron Rapoport

== Charts ==
Chart (2001)	Peak position
Canadian Albums (Billboard)	22
Norwegian Albums (VG-lista)	22
US Billboard 200	165

Singles from Plan B
Year	Single	Chart	Position
2001	"Let Her Go and Start Over"	Adult Contemporary (Billboard)	23
