= 2 AM Club =

Bar in Mill Valley, California

Coordinates: 37.89709°N 122.53712°W

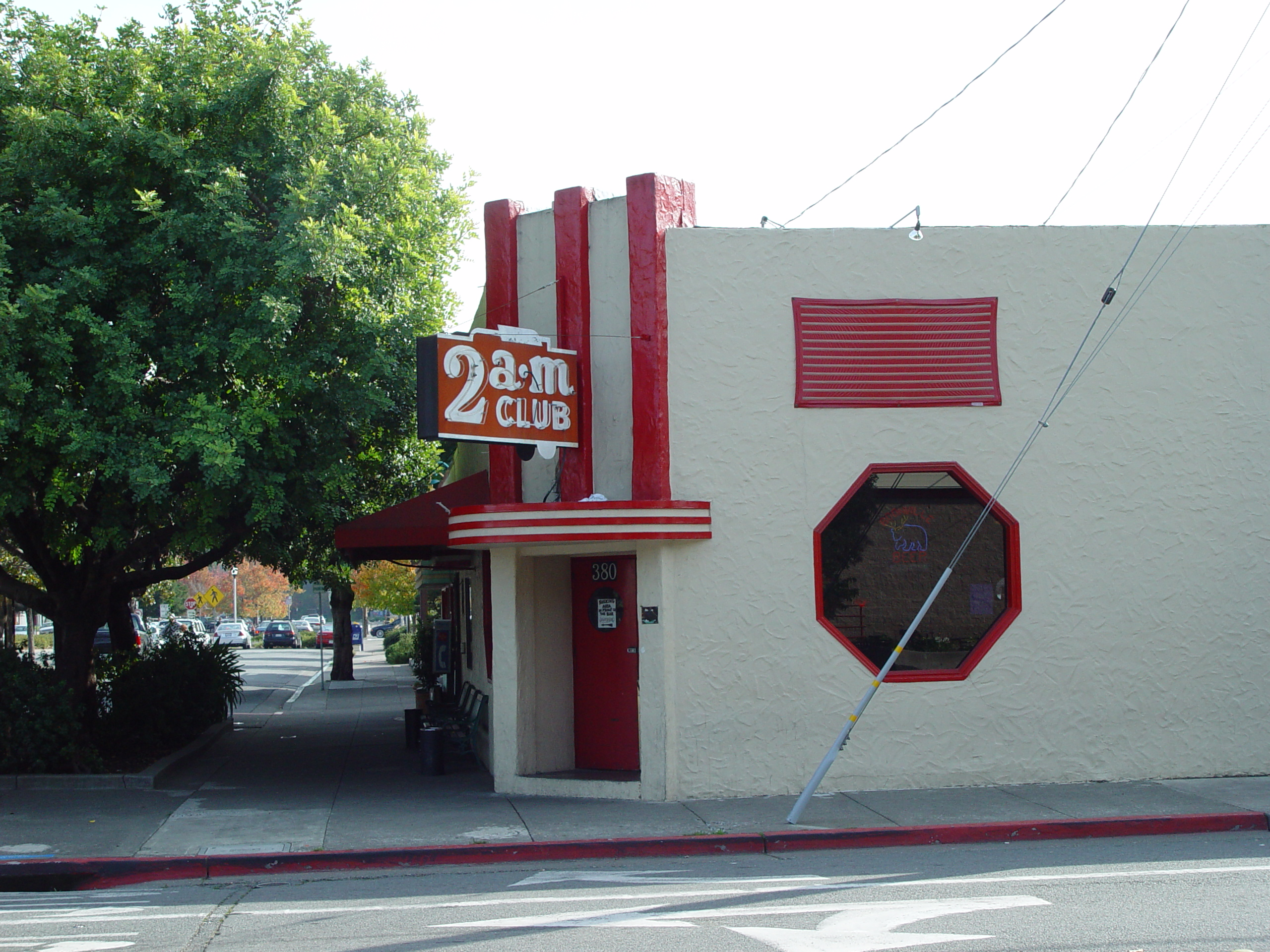
The 2 AM Club, 2003

Huey Lewis and the News' album cover Sports, taken at The 2 AM Club

The 2 AM Club is a bar in Mill Valley, California.

== History ==
The bar was opened by Bill Brown on the corner of Miller and Montford, and was called The Brown Jug. Prohibition forced its closure in 1921, and the saloon became a grain and feed store. With the repeal of Prohibition, it was reopened in 1933 with the same name by local contractor Joe Hornsby, who bought the building.

It became known as the 2 AM Club because it was outside the Mill Valley city limits and so was allowed to stay open until 2 am, whereas bars within the city had to close by 10 pm. It was officially renamed the 2 AM Club in 1940.

It is known locally as "The Deuce".

The bar was used for the location of the cover photo of the Huey Lewis and the News album Sports; Lewis himself attended school in Mill Valley.

A toilet seat guitar created by Charlie Deal hangs behind the bar. Deal obtained a patent for the idea. The guitar is one of the many items visible in the photographs used for the Sports album.

The band 2AM Club named themselves after the bar.
