= Walking on a Thin Line (song) =

Single by Huey Lewis and the News

from the album Sports
- B-side: "The Only One"
- Released: October 9, 1984
- Recorded: 1983
- Genre: Rock
- Length: 5:11 (album version); 4:01 (single version)
- Label: Chrysalis
- Songwriters: Andre Pessis, Kevin Wells
- Producers: Huey Lewis and the News

Huey Lewis and the News singles chronology
| "If This Is It" (1984) | "Walking on a Thin Line" (1984) | "The Power of Love" (1985) |

Music video
- "Walking on a Thin Line" on YouTube

"Walking On a Thin Line" is a song performed by Huey Lewis and the News, released in 1984 as the fifth and final single from their 1983 album, Sports.

== History ==
Considered one of the band's more "serious" songs, "Walking on a Thin Line" was written by Andre Pessis and Kevin Wells (of Clover, then 5000 Volts). The Sacramento Bee thought the song was about a veteran's post-war stress. However, the song is really about the thoughts of serving Vietnam War soldiers and veterans in the midst of the war.

In live performances, Lewis would often dedicate the song to the casualties of the war in Vietnam, as well as the veterans. During some live performances, ESPN personality Chris Berman, who is a fan of the band, has shown up as a surprise guest, singing the song with the band. Berman, who met the band at an ESPN tenth anniversary party, when describing football highlights on NFL Live, would sometimes reference the chorus to the song.

== Reception ==
Reception for the song was very mixed. Christopher Connelly of Rolling Stone said that the song was "annoying", and added that, "wherein Lewis even sings 'desperation' just like Men at Work's Colin Hay. The tune's a semistomper but has lines about a Vietnam serviceman – 'I'm the boy next door/The one you find so easy to ignore/Is that what I was fighting for?' – that some claim equates military service with Getting the Girl." Steve Morse of The Boston Globe thought that it was one of the band's more "serious" songs. Morse also thought that it was an "unusual piece" and that it was a "funky ode to Vietnam veterans". Robert Draper of the Austin Chronicle said that it showed that Lewis could show "signs of awareness." The Arizona Daily Star said that the song showed the band's "modest abilities for rockin' out." Billboard called it "more good-natured rock 'n' roll (angry lyrics notwithstanding)." Cash Box said that "the vocals are powerful, and especially fine guitar playing also compliments this single." Stephen Thomas Erlewine of AllMusic calls the song one of the songs on the album that has "memorable hooks, driven home with economical precision by a tight bar band, who are given just enough polish to make them sound like superstars."

== Chart performance ==
In the United States, the song was the last single released from the album, Sports. It peaked at No. 18 on the Billboard Hot 100, the only single from the album not to reach the top 10 on the chart. The song was a top 20 hit on the Top Rock Tracks chart, peaking at No. 16. In Australia, the single reached No. 70.

=== Charts ===
| Chart (1984) | Peak position |
|---|---|
| Australia (Kent Music Report) | 70 |
| Israel (IBA) | 27 |
| US Billboard Hot 100 | 18 |
| US Top Rock Tracks (Billboard) | 16 |
| US Cash Box'Top 100 | 23 |
