= Sports (Huey Lewis and the News album) =

Studio album by Huey Lewis and the News
- Released: September 15, 1983
- Recorded: December 1982–June 1983
- Studios: Fantasy (Berkeley, California); Record Plant (Sausalito, California); The Automatt (San Francisco)
- Genres: Rock; pop rock
- Length: 37:46
- Label: Chrysalis
- Producers: Huey Lewis and the News

Huey Lewis and the News chronology
Picture This (1982)	Sports (1983)	Fore! (1986)

Singles from Sports
- 1. "Heart and Soul" Released: August 30, 1983; 2. "I Want a New Drug" Released: January 3, 1984; 3. "The Heart of Rock & Roll" Released: April 10, 1984; 4. "If This Is It" Released: July 10, 1984; 5. "Walking on a Thin Line" Released: October 9, 1984

Sports is the third album by American rock band Huey Lewis and the News, released on September 15, 1983, by Chrysalis Records. It reached No. 1 on the Billboard 200 on June 30, 1984, and ultimately charted for 160 weeks. Sports was ranked No. 2 on the Billboard year-end album chart for 1984 and spawned four top-ten hits on the Billboard Hot 100, with "Heart and Soul" and "The Heart of Rock & Roll" earning Grammy Award nominations. Sports also did well internationally, where most of its singles charted in the top 40 in multiple countries. The album has been certified 7× Platinum by the RIAA.

== Writing ==
Back in the day you wanted your albums to have a theme, and Sports' theme was really a collection of singles ... It was really a record for its time. In the 80s, the way radio was programmed, if you didn't have a hit record you weren't going to be able to make any more records. That was it, period. So our priority was to come up with hit singles. Every tune we aimed for radio 'cause we didn't know which one was going to be a hit. We just knew we needed a frickin' hit, period. And fortunately we got 'em.

— Huey Lewis; Billboard magazine, 2013

"The Heart of Rock & Roll" was developed after the band performed at the Agora Theatre and Ballroom in Cleveland, Ohio in 1980, which they had been told was a "great rock & roll town". The following day, Lewis told his bandmates that he felt the heart of rock and roll really was in Cleveland and thought the sentiment would make for a good song, but the band convinced him to slightly alter the lyrics to "the heart of rock & roll is still beating".

"Bad Is Bad" was penned with Lewis' original band, Clover. It was written in the late 1970s while Lewis was working with Thin Lizzy, whose frontman Phil Lynott liked the song so much that he would sing a fast-paced version at some of his concerts. Another version of "Bad Is Bad" appeared on Dave Edmunds' album Repeat When Necessary (1979), featuring Lewis on harmonica.

The idea for "I Want a New Drug" came to Lewis during a car ride to his lawyer's office, and he wrote down the majority of the lyrics upon arriving. After Lewis made an unsuccessful attempt to put the idea to music with bassist Mario Cipollina, guitarist Chris Hayes developed new music for the final song on his own.

"Walking on a Thin Line", written by Andre Pessis and former Clover member Kevin Wells, was about the poor treatment of veterans who returned home from the Vietnam War. "Finally Found a Home", inspired by an offhand comment about "ticky-tacky" houses near an airport, later progressed into a song about having a career in the music business. Saxophonist/guitarist Johnny Colla wrote the music for "If This Is It" alone and gave the song to Lewis, who penned the lyrics on a tour bus. "You Crack Me Up", written by Lewis and Cipollina, was based on various people the band had encountered in the parking lot of Uncle Charlie's, a bar the band had frequently performed at before they achieved mainstream success.

Sports also contains cover versions of "Heart and Soul", written by the songwriting team of Mike Chapman and Nicky Chinn, and "Honky Tonk Blues", written by Hank Williams.

== Production ==
Sports was self-produced by the band after their manager, Bob Brown, felt the band's own demos were better than the producers they had been considering. The ethos behind the production of the album was to meld old techniques and instrumentation with modern technology, inspired by hearing the use of an electronic drum machine on Steely Dan's 1980 song "Hey Nineteen". The juxtaposition of an old style vocal sound with the modern LinnDrum on "Bad Is Bad" provided guidance for the rest of the album's production.

Lewis's idea to record "I Want a New Drug" with a sequenced bass line and drum machine was initially met with displeasure by both bassist Mario Cipollina and drummer Bill Gibson. The first attempt at this was deemed unsatisfactory and the song was re-recorded with the full band, but after the album was mixed, Lewis decided that both "I Want a New Drug" and "The Heart of Rock & Roll" needed to be re-recorded with sequenced bass and drums, adding a slight tempo increase in the process. The band initially used a kick drum to create the simulated heartbeat sound for "The Heart of Rock & Roll" but were unhappy with the results, so engineer Jim Gaines and keyboardist Sean Hopper spent six hours developing a new heartbeat sound using various other means. Lewis later referred to the album's production style as "cut and paste, put together piece by piece".

Lewis approached Gaines with the idea to record "Heart and Soul", which they initially thought was an unreleased song. Gaines later recalled that, while the band was working on the song, an engineer mentioned that it had already been covered by both Exile [sic] (Note: Exile was the first to record the song, so it is not a cover.) and the BusBoys. Although the band's recording was ultimately finished, it was initially shelved. However, Lewis later recalled hearing the BusBoys recording their version in an adjacent studio, and that he'd decided his version with the News "had merit" and was "maybe a little better". It eventually became the album's first single. "Honky Tonk Blues" was an attempt to cover the Hank Williams song in the style of Status Quo, and Lewis later stated that Hank Williams Jr. complimented the News on their rendition.

Brown became concerned about Sports being promoted properly when the band's label, Chrysalis Records, fired much of its production staff. As a result, the band made a decision to withhold the finished record from the label until the issues were resolved.

== Packaging ==
The title of the album was a play on the band's name. The cover art features a photo of the band at the 2 AM Club, a bar located in Mill Valley, California, where the band had performed during its early days. A bar was chosen for the shoot because the band reasoned that most people watched televised sporting events in bars.

== Release and reception ==
Professional ratings
Review scores
Source	Rating
AllMusic	4.5/5 stars
The Rolling Stone Album Guide	3/5 stars
The Village Voice	B+

Sports was released on September 15, 1983. The lead single, "Heart and Soul", peaked at number 8 on the Billboard Hot 100 singles chart. The album's second release, "I Want a New Drug", turned out to be the band's second best-selling single, peaking at number 6 on the Hot 100 and eventually being certified gold in 1989, with sales of 1 million copies (although this would be considered platinum by modern single certification standards). The third single from the album, "The Heart of Rock & Roll", continued the band's success, peaking at number 6 on the Hot 100.

In June 1984, Sports hit number 1 on the Billboard 200 and would ultimately spend 160 weeks on the charts. The fourth single from the album, "If This Is It", was released shortly thereafter, peaking at number 6 on the Hot 100. The fifth and final single from the album, "Walking on a Thin Line", was released in October 1984 and peaked at number 18.

Sports was the second biggest selling album on Billboard's 1984 end-of-year sales chart, after Michael Jackson's Thriller. "Heart and Soul" was nominated for a Grammy Award for Best Rock Vocal by a Group at the 26th Annual Grammy Awards in 1984, while "The Heart of Rock & Roll" was nominated for Record of the Year at the 27th Annual Grammys in 1985. Sports charted in the top 40 in many countries outside the United States, including Canada, Germany, New Zealand, Norway, Sweden and the United Kingdom. On July 20, 1987, the Recording Industry Association of America certified the album 7× Platinum for sales exceeding 7 million units.

Music videos were created for the singles "Heart and Soul", "I Want a New Drug", "The Heart of Rock & Roll", "If This Is It" and "Walking on a Thin Line". The band later filmed a music video for "Bad Is Bad" on the streets of San Francisco in March 1985, although the song was not released as a single.

"I Want a New Drug" became the focus of a lawsuit against artist Ray Parker Jr., who was accused of plagiarizing the song for his 1984 hit, "Ghostbusters". The case was eventually settled out of court for an undisclosed sum, although Parker later countersued Lewis for breach of a confidentiality agreement, after Lewis discussed the lawsuit on VH1's Behind the Music in 2001.

== Legacy ==
The album is critiqued by the character Patrick Bateman in both the book (1991) and film (2000) versions of American Psycho by Bret Easton Ellis. According to Bateman, Sports marks the point in the band's career in which they "really came into their own, commercially and artistically." In 2013, Lewis, along with "Weird Al" Yankovic, parodied this scene in a video for Funny or Die, wherein Lewis mirrors Bateman's character and chats with Yankovic about American Psycho.

On May 10, 2013, Huey Lewis and the News embarked upon a Sports 30th Anniversary Tour, in which they performed the album in its entirety, as well as other songs. On May 14, a two-disc 30th Anniversary Edition of Sports was released, featuring the remastered album in addition to archival live versions of every song on the album.

== Track listing ==
Side one
No.	Title	Writer(s)	Length
1.	"The Heart of Rock & Roll"	Johnny Colla; Huey Lewis	5:04
2.	"Heart and Soul"	Mike Chapman; Nicky Chinn	4:13
3.	"Bad Is Bad"	Alex Call; John Ciambotti; Sean Hopper; Lewis; John McFee; Michael Schriener	3:48
4.	"I Want a New Drug"	Chris Hayes; Lewis	4:46

Side two
No.	Title	Writer(s)	Length
1.	"Walking on a Thin Line"	Andre Pessis; Kevin Wells	5:11
2.	"Finally Found a Home"	Bob Brown; Hayes; Lewis	3:43
3.	"If This Is It"	Colla; Lewis	3:54
4.	"You Crack Me Up"	Mario Cipollina; Lewis	3:42
5.	"Honky Tonk Blues"	Hank Williams	3:26

== Personnel ==
Huey Lewis and the News

- Huey Lewis – vocals, harmonica
- Mario Cipollina – bass guitar
- Johnny Colla – vocals, saxophone, guitar
- Bill Gibson – drums, vocals, percussion
- Chris Hayes – lead guitar, vocals
- Sean Hopper – keyboards, vocals

Additional musician

- John McFee – pedal steel guitar ("Honky Tonk Blues")

Technical

- Huey Lewis and the News – producers
- Jim Gaines – engineer
- Jeffrey (Nik) Norman – additional engineer, assistant engineer (tracks 1–3, 5–9)
- Jesse Osborne – assistant engineer (tracks 1–3, 5–9)
- Bob Clearmountain – mixing (tracks 1–3, 5–9)
- Larry Alexander – mixing (track 4)
- Bob Greenberg – assistant engineer (track 4)
- Mark Deadman – sound engineer
- Ted Jensen – mastering
- Bennett Hall – creative director, cover art, handtinted photography, photo montage
- Bunny Zaruba – graphic and logo design

== Charts ==
=== Weekly charts ===
Chart (1984–1985)	Peak position
Australian Albums (Kent Music Report)	22
Canadian Albums (RPM)	3
European Top 100 Albums	47
German Albums (Offizielle Top 100)	29
Japanese Albums (Oricon)	55
New Zealand Albums (RMNZ)	19
Norwegian Albums (VG-lista)	6
Swedish Albums (Sverigetopplistan)	40
UK Albums (OCC)	23
US Billboard 200	1
Chart (2013)	Peak position
US Top Catalog Albums (Billboard)	10

=== Year-end charts ===
Chart (1984)	Position
Canadian Albums Chart	3
New Zealand Albums Chart	44
Norwegian Albums Chart (Julen Period)	7
US Billboard Top Pop Albums	2
Chart (1985)	Position
Canadian Albums Chart	88
US Billboard Top Pop Albums	14

=== Singles and tracks ===
Year	Single	Chart	Position
1983	"Heart and Soul"	Billboard Top Rock Tracks	1
1983	"Heart and Soul"	The Billboard Hot 100	8
1983	"I Want a New Drug"	Billboard Top Rock Tracks	7
1984	"I Want a New Drug"	The Billboard Hot 100	6
1984	"I Want a New Drug"	Billboard Hot Dance/Disco	1
1984	"The Heart of Rock & Roll"	The Billboard Hot 100	6
1984	"The Heart of Rock & Roll"	Billboard Top Rock Tracks	5
1984	"If This Is It"	Billboard Adult Contemporary	5
1984	"If This Is It"	Billboard Top Rock Tracks	3
1984	"If This Is It"	The Billboard Hot 100	6
1984	"Finally Found a Home"	Billboard Top Rock Tracks	41
1984	"Walking on a Thin Line"	Billboard Top Rock Tracks	16
1984	"Walking on a Thin Line"	The Billboard Hot 100	18

== Certifications ==
Region	Certification	Certified units/sales
Canada (Music Canada)	Diamond	1,000,000^{^}
New Zealand (RMNZ)	Platinum	15,000^{^}
United Kingdom (BPI)	Gold	100,000^{^}
United States (RIAA)	7× Platinum	7,000,000^{^}
^{^} Shipments figures based on certification alone.
