= If This Is It (Huey Lewis and the News song) =

Single by Huey Lewis and the News

from the album Sports
- B-side: "Change of Heart"
- Released: July 10, 1984
- Recorded: 1983
- Genre: Pop rock; doo-wop
- Length: 3:54
- Label: Chrysalis
- Songwriters: Johnny Colla, Huey Lewis
- Producer: Huey Lewis and the News

Huey Lewis and the News singles chronology
"The Heart of Rock & Roll" (1984)	"If This Is It" (1984)	"Walking on a Thin Line" (1984)

"If This Is It" is a song by American rock band Huey Lewis and the News. It was released as the fourth single from their number-one album Sports in 1983, and became their fifth top-ten and third consecutive number-six hit on the Billboard Hot 100. It also reached number five on the Adult Contemporary chart, and then became their first UK hit single, reaching number 39 on the UK Singles Chart. The song is written in 12/8 time signature.

== Reception ==
Billboard magazine called it a "guileless '50s throwback." Cash Box called the song "doo-wop at its finest."

== Music video ==
The music video for "If This Is It" was filmed in Santa Cruz, California, in June 1984. Huey is seen trying to reconcile with his ex-girlfriend (Janet Cross). He sees her on the beach and at a line of midway amusements with other men, and has a flashback of a romantic night with her. His ex's friend (Sandra Wilder) observes Huey's frustrations and feels sorry for him. After one last effort by Huey to win his ex back fails, he sits alone on the beach as the crowd fades. The ex's friend then appears, smiling at Huey, and they walk away together toward the boardwalk. The video ends with a family, who spent hours looking for an open space on the beach, finally locating one, only to be attacked by a shark underneath the sand that charges toward them.

The band appears in various scenes on the beach, one of which features them singing the chorus while buried in sand with only their heads visible. Comedian John Means appears as the Ball Toss Manager.

In an interview with the blog Noblemania, Cross recalled the challenges of playing Lewis' irritable ex-girlfriend. "Looking angry at Huey Lewis was tough," she said. "The whole filming was hilarious, one stunt after another and all the different boyfriends they gave me. When [Huey and I] were pretending to fight it was hard not to laugh."

The video was directed by Edd Griles, who also directed the band's videos for "The Heart of Rock & Roll" and "Stuck with You", as well as Cyndi Lauper's "Girls Just Want to Have Fun" and "Time After Time".

The video starts with a snippet of another Huey Lewis and the News song, "I Want a New Drug", also from the album Sports.

== Chart performance ==
=== Weekly charts ===
Chart (1984)	Peak position
Australia (Kent Music Report)	20
Canada Top Singles (RPM)	6
Canada Adult Contemporary (RPM)	4
Canada Retail Singles (The Record)	9
Europe (Eurochart Hot 100)	80
Europe (European Hit Radio)	33
Iceland (Íslenski Listinn Topp 40)	10
Israel (IBA)	32
New Zealand (Recorded Music NZ)	37
Norway (VG-lista)	8
Sweden (Sverigetopplistan)	10
UK Singles (OCC)	39
UK Airplay (Music & Media)	10
US Billboard Hot 100	6
US Billboard Adult Contemporary	5
US Billboard Top Rock Tracks	19
US Cash BoxTop 100	6

=== Year-end charts ===
Chart (1984)	Rank
Canada	54
Norwegian Julen Period	14
US Billboard Hot 100	64
US Cash Box Top 100	56
