= Daniel Ponce =

American jazz musician

Daniel Ponce (July 21, 1953 – March 14, 2013) was a Cuban-American jazz percussionist.

He was born in Havana, Cuba, and Ponce played locally in Havana from age 11, and played percussion in a group called Watusi. He was exiled from Cuba in 1980 and fled to New York City. The Gonzalez brothers heard him play in Central Park, and brought him on October 27, 1981 to Soundscape, 500 West 52nd Street, for their Latin Music Tuesdays. It was there that he met Paquito D'Rivera, another eminent Cuban musician who had come to the US via Spain, when he defected from Cuba. Soon after he was working there with D'Rivera, Jose Fajardo, Andy Gonzalez, Jerry Gonzalez, and Eddie Palmieri. In 1982, he played three batá drums as a session musician for the Herbie Hancock song "Rockit". Producer Bill Laswell said "Ponce essentially was a musician/priest, and all the rhythms he would play on those batá drums were associated with a Yoruba deity. It was basically Santeria."

Although "Rockit" was a major hit for Hancock, it did not impact on Ponce's career. Verna Gillis, the director of Soundscape and the first person in the US to become involved with directing his career, produced his first few albums. These included New York Now (1982) and Arawe in 1983. Gillis also produced Ponce's collaboration with Celia Cruz, which rehearsed at Soundscape and performed at SOB's. He also did work as a session musician for Laurie Anderson, Mick Jagger, and Yoko Ono.

He married Maritza Rueda and they had a son Daniel Ponce, Jr.

He died on March 14, 2013, in Miami, Florida, from a heart attack.
