= Jim Whiting =

British artist and inventor (born 1951)

- Born: January 11, 1951 (age 75); Paris, France
- Known for: artist, inventor
- Awards: MTV Video Music Award for Best Art Direction

Jim Whiting (born 1951) is a British artist and inventor. He was born in Paris and spent his early childhood in Salisbury (now Harare), Zimbabwe before returning to the UK with his family in 1959. He studied Electronic Engineering & Systems Control at Queen Mary College and then sculpture at Saint Martins School of Art after a foundation at High Wycombe Art College.

Whiting's first major installation was in 1979 at The Hayward gallery in London, His Business Machine was chosen by artist Helen Chadwick as part of the summer show. Other shows of his animated figurative works followed, including Purgatory at British museums, galleries and festivals, and Heavenly Bodies on the roof of the Royal National Theatre in 1981. He received international recognition in 1984 after his robot-like sculptures were featured dancing in Herbie Hancock's music video for "Rockit" directed by duo Godley & Creme, winning the first MTV Video Music Award for Best Art Direction.

Whiting's Mechanical Theatre was commissioned in 1987 by Andre Heller for his Luna Luna art/amusement park in Hamburg. From 1988 to 1992 he took his Unnatural Bodies show on tour, exhibiting in Cologne, Zürich, Berlin, Basel, with Galerie Littmann, and later in Glasgow, Linz (Ars Electronica) and also as the Tower in London's Broadgate and Aurillac Festival. In 1994 he created a waggon installation for Klaus Littmann's KunstZug, which was exhibited at stations in Switzerland, France and Germany.

His work has now been incorporated into his variété venue Bimbotown based in the Leipziger Baumwollspinnerei a former factory in Leipzig that has become home to dozens of international artists and galleries. Originally launched in 1993 in Basel, Bimbotown moved to Leipzig in 1996 where Whiting continued to host parties, which The Guardian newspaper recently described in a round up of the best of Germany as "a mix of music, theatre and lots of crazy stuff by artists from all over Europe". Bimbotown was closed in 2016.

In 2007 a new version of his Mechanical Theatre was commissioned for the Swarovski Kristallwelten (Crystal Worlds) theme park in Austria, which was conceived by André Heller and features work by famous modern artists. He continues to exhibit his installations in Europe.
