= Heart and Soul (Exile song) =

1981 song by Exile, made famous by Huey Lewis and the News in 1983

Single by Exile

from the album Heart and Soul
- Released: 1981
- Genre: Rock
- Length: 6:10
- Label: Warner Bros.
- Songwriters: Mike Chapman; Nicky Chinn
- Producer: Mike Chapman

Exile singles chronology
"Take Me Down" (1980)	"Heart and Soul" (1981)	"What Kind of Love Is This" (1981)

Audio
- "Heart and Soul" on YouTube

"Heart and Soul"

Single by Huey Lewis and the News

from the album Sports
- B-side: "You Crack Me Up"
- Released: August 30, 1983
- Genre: Pop rock
- Length: 4:13 (Album version); 3:55 (Single version)
- Label: Chrysalis
- Songwriters: Mike Chapman; Nicky Chinn
- Producers: Huey Lewis and the News

Huey Lewis and the News singles chronology
"Workin' for a Livin'" (1982)	"Heart and Soul" (1983)	"I Want a New Drug" (1984)

Music video
- "Heart and Soul" on YouTube

"Heart and Soul" is a song written by Mike Chapman and Nicky Chinn and made famous by Huey Lewis and the News. The song was first recorded by Exile in 1981 as the title track to their album Heart and Soul. Exile's single failed to crack the Billboard Hot 100, peaking at No. 2 (No. 102) on the Bubbling Under Hot 100 Singles chart. Despite this, the song was a minor hit on the UK charts peaking at No. 54 and the German charts peaking at No. 75. The song was also recorded by the BusBoys for their 1982 album American Worker.

== The BusBoys version ==
In 1982, American rock and roll band the BusBoys covered the song for their album American Worker. Their version is a mix of both rock and funk.

== Huey Lewis and the News version ==
Huey Lewis and the News' version was released as the first single from the album Sports in 1983. The single peaked at number 8 on the U.S. Billboard Hot 100 that November and number one on the Billboard Top Rock Tracks chart. It was nominated for a Grammy Award for Best Rock Vocal, Group at the 26th Annual Grammy Awards in 1984.

Former band member Chris Hayes later remarked, "I don't know why 'Heart & Soul' sounds so good. Usually we have to re-do all the guitar parts – this time it worked out the first time. I had a Marshall amp in a tiny room, played my Les Paul and it was great!"

=== Music video ===
The music video featured Lewis looking for, and leaving with, a woman in a dance club, with Lewis concert footage spliced in. Portions of the video are filmed in Potrero Hill, a neighborhood in San Francisco. Lewis liked Potrero Hill because it "looked very San Francisco". Actress Signy Coleman plays the woman Lewis is chasing after in the dance club. Coleman also appears in the music video for "I Want a New Drug".

=== Charts ===
Weekly charts

Chart (1983)	Peak position
Australia (Kent Music Report)	25
Belgium (Ultratop 50 Flanders)	30
Canada Top Singles (RPM)	12
Canada Retail Singles (The Record)	14
Israel (IBA)	15
Netherlands (Single Top 100)	41
New Zealand (Recorded Music NZ)	41
US Billboard Hot 100	8
US Billboard Top Rock Tracks	1
US Cash Box Top 100	10
West Germany (GfK)	39
Chart (1984)	Peak position
France (SNEP)	56
Spain Airplay (Top 40 Radio)	40
Chart (1985)	Peak position
UK Singles (OCC)	61

Year-end charts

Chart (1983)	Rank
U.S. Cash Box	70

== See also ==
- List of Billboard Mainstream Rock number-one songs of the 1980s
