= Edd Griles =

American music video director (1945–2024)

- Born: November 18, 1945; New York City, U.S.
- Died: October 22, 2024 (aged 78); Englewood, New Jersey, U.S.
- Occupations: Television producer, music video director

Edward Mori Griles (November 18, 1945 – October 22, 2024) was an American television producer and music video director.

== Background ==
Griles was born to Pearl "Corky" Griles (née Hirsch) and Daniel Griles (born Greilshiemer) in New York City, and was raised in Astoria and Flushing, Queens.

Griles later suffered from Alzheimer's disease. He died at the Actors Fund Home in Englewood, New Jersey, on October 22, 2024, at the age of 78.

== Career ==
After graduating from School of Visual Arts in New York City, Griles began his professional career in 1965 in advertising at Doyle, Dane, Bernbach Advertising (DDB Worldwide) as an Art Director. In 1972 he became creative director for the National Hockey League and served as editor and creative director of Goal Magazine and Executive Producer of NHL Films. In 1975 he created People and Properties, a sports and entertainment marketing company and in 2002 he founded Timing Is Everything Productions, a multi-media creative marketing company.

In 1979 he began directing music videos for musical groups such as Deep Purple and Rainbow. He also directed videos for a group called Blue Angel, which included band member Cyndi Lauper. In 1983, Griles directed Lauper's first video release as a solo artist; "Girls Just Want to Have Fun". In 1984 he was nominated as director of the year at the MTV VMA's for his video for "Time After Time". Also in 1984, he was awarded the title, director of the year, at the Billboard Awards for the video "Girls Just Want to Have Fun".

=== Television producer ===
Griles produced the first ESPY Awards in 1993 and the first and second MTV Video Music Awards (1984, 1985). Griles was also the producer for the TV show Welcome Home America featuring Bob Hope, Frank Sinatra, and Arnold Schwarzenegger performing in front of Presidents George H. W. Bush, Ronald Reagan, and Gerald Ford and a contingent of 4500 returning troops from the 1991 Gulf War. American Heroes - A Sunday evening anthology series centered on sports topics and personalities. In 1996 Griles began a three-year stint as producer of Miss Universe, Miss USA, and Miss Teen USA. At that time the show was owned by Madison Square Garden, a division of Paramount. To help boost ratings, Griles hired Marla Maples Trump as the host of the shows. Griles was instrumental in the sale of Miss Universe to Donald Trump and worked for him in 1998. In 1998 Griles co-executive produced the 26th Anniversary of Catch a Rising Star.

In 2004 he created and produced AutoRox, the first Automotive Awards show ever televised. In 2004 he also created and produced the Ultimate Chop, the Biker Build-Off Awards. He produced 30 Seconds Over Washington for HBO an interstitial series starring Bill Maher and Dennis Miller. He served as co-executive producer with Rick Newman on Comedy Central's "USO Comedy Tour". This series appeared in 1991 and 2002. Directed an episode of Shelley Duvall's Tall Tales & Legends. The Legend of Sleepy Hollow starring Ed Begley, Jr., Charles Durning, and Beverly D'Angelo. He was co-Executive Producer of the animated feature "Pound Puppies and the Legend of Big Paw". Griles was a co-executive producer of the 1988 tv movie film adaptation of Herman Wouk's play The Caine Mutiny Court Martial directed by Robert Altman. In 2008, Griles produced an illumination for the Grand Opening of Atlantis, The Palm and the Palm Islands in Dubai.

=== Music video director ===
Griles directed the following music videos:

Rainbow - featuring Ritchie Blackmore and Roger Glover

- "I Surrender"
- "Can't Happen Here"
- "Death Alley Driver"
- "Stone Cold"

Novo Combo - featuring Michael Shrieve (formerly the drummer of Santana)

- "Tattoo"

Blue Angel - featuring Cyndi Lauper

- "Late"
- "I Had a Love"
- "I'm Gonna Be Strong"

Cyndi Lauper

- "Girls Just Want to Have Fun"
  - Winner; MTV Video Music Award for Best Female Video
  - Also indications; MTV Video Music Award for Video of the Year, MTV Video Music Award for Best Concept Video, MTV Video Music Award – Viewer's Choice, MTV Video Music Award for Best Overall Performance
- "Time After Time"
  - Winner; April 1985 American Video Awards for Best Pop Video and Best Director.
  - Also indications; MTV Video Music Award for Best Female Video, MTV Video Music Award for Best Direction
- "She Bop"
  - Indication; MTV Video Music Award for Best Female Video
- "Hole in My Heart" (Theme from Vibes)

Huey Lewis and the News

- "The Heart of Rock & Roll"
- "If This Is It"
- "Stuck with You"
- Be-Fore - A documentary airing on Showtime by filmmaker Les Blank about the making of "Stuck with You".

Sheena Easton

- "Do It for Love" - Marked the debut of a young actor named Billy Zane. Zane went on to star in the 1997 film Titanic.
- "Jimmy Mack" - Remake of classic song by Martha Reeves and the Vandellas
- "So Far So Good" - From the soundtrack of the 1986 film About Last Night...

Eddie Murphy

- "Party All the Time"

Peter Wolf

- "Oo-Ee-Diddley-Bop!"
- "Come as You Are"

Lee Greenwood

- "God Bless the USA"

Rodney Crowell and Rosanne Cash

- "It's Such a Small World"

World Wrestling Entertainment

- "Land of a Thousand Dances" - Featuring Cyndi Lauper, Meat Loaf, Rick Derringer, and over 50 wrestlers from the WWE.
