= Bill Laswell =

American musician (born 1955)

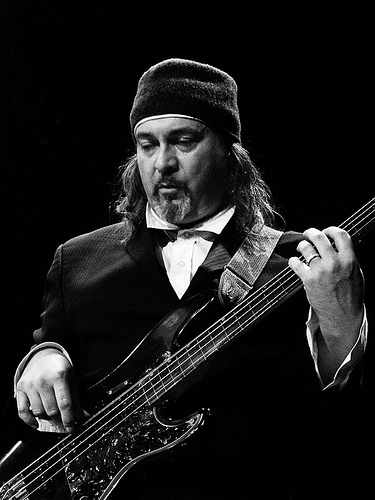
- Laswell in 2006

Background information
- Born: William Otis Laswell; February 12, 1955 (age 71); Salem, Illinois, U.S.
- Genre: Avant-garde
- Occupations: Musician; record producer; label owner
- Instruments: Bass guitar; guitar; keyboards
- Years active: 1978–present
- Labels: M.O.D. Reloaded; M.O.D. Technologies; Elektra Musician; Axiom; Island; PolyGram; Virgin
- Website: billlaswell.net

William Otis Laswell (born February 12, 1955) is an American bass guitarist, record producer, and record label owner. He has been involved in thousands of recordings with many collaborators from all over the world. His music draws from funk, world music, jazz, dub, and ambient styles.

According to music critic Chris Brazier, "Laswell's pet concept is 'collision music' which involves bringing together musicians from wildly divergent but complementary spheres and seeing what comes out." Although his bands may be credited under the same name and often feature the same roster of musicians, the styles and themes explored on different albums can vary dramatically. Material began as a noisy dance music band, but later albums concentrated on hip-hop, jazz, or spoken word readings by William S. Burroughs. Most versions of the band Praxis have included guitarist Buckethead, but they have explored different permutations on albums.

== Early life ==
Bill Laswell was born on February 12, 1955, in Salem, Illinois. As a child, his family relocated frequently, exposing Laswell to a variety of regional cultural and musical traditions.

In his teenage years, Laswell's family settled in Michigan, an area with a very diverse music scene during the 1960s and 1970s, from Motown Records to Detroit's burgeoning punk and rock scenes. During this time, Laswell taught himself to play bass guitar, and he developed an unconventional approach to the instrument, experimenting with its potential to create soundscapes rather than merely support rhythm.

== Career ==
=== Early years ===
Laswell began performing as a bass guitarist in R&B and funk bands in Detroit and Ann Arbor, Michigan, and saw shows that combined genres, such as Iggy and the Stooges, MC5, and Funkadelic. He was also influenced by jazz musicians John Coltrane, Albert Ayler, and Miles Davis. The live jazz performances and experimental rock acts of Michigan's music festivals encouraged him towards musical experimentation and non-traditional forms, including African drumming, Indian ragas, and Middle Eastern maqams. Later, he was intrigued by the avant-garde and experimental movements of the 1970s, including the works of minimalist composers and electronic music pioneers. He began experimenting with effects pedals and early recording techniques, reflecting his broader artistic philosophy, that music could transcend traditional categorizations and connect diverse cultural and sonic elements.

=== New York and Material ===
In the late 1970s Laswell moved to New York City, immersing himself in the thriving New York music scene. He moved into producer Giorgio Gomelsky's loft and became part of a group of musicians that would become the first version of Material. Material became the backing band for Daevid Allen and New York Gong. The band consisted of Laswell, keyboardist Michael Beinhorn, and drummer Fred Maher. They were usually supplemented by guitarists Cliff Cultreri or Robert Quine.

He worked with Brian Eno, Fred Frith, John Zorn, Daniel Ponce, Ginger Baker, Peter Brötzmann, Kip Hanrahan, Sonny Sharrock, and with musicians in no wave, a genre that combined avant-garde jazz, funk, and punk.

He started a recording studio with Martin Bisi and met Jean Karakos, owner of Celluloid Records. Under the Material name Laswell became the de facto house producer for Celluloid until the label was sold in the 1980s. He recorded music that was experimental, combining jazz, funk, pop, and R&B, by musicians such as Whitney Houston, Sonny Sharrock, Archie Shepp, Henry Threadgill, and the band Massacre with Fred Frith and Fred Maher. His association with Celluloid allowed his first forays into "collision music", a term coined by British writer Chris May of Black Music & Jazz Review. Recordings with the Golden Palominos and production on albums by Shango, Toure Kunda, and Fela Kuti appeared on the label. Celluloid was an early advocate of hip-hop, producing albums by Fab 5 Freddy, GrandMixer D.ST, Phase II, and Afrika Bambaataa. The album World Destruction paired John Lydon with Afrika Bambaataa years before Aerosmith and Run–D.M.C. collaborated on their rock/hip-hop version of "Walk This Way".

In 1982, Laswell released Baselines, his solo debut album. A year later, he had a breakthrough with "Rockit", a song he co-wrote and produced for Herbie Hancock's album Future Shock. He played bass guitar and co-wrote other songs on the album, leading to collaborations with Hancock through the 2000s. He won a Grammy Award for producing Hancock's next album, Sound-System.

He became a member of the band Last Exit in 1986 with Peter Brötzmann, Ronald Shannon Jackson, and Sonny Sharrock. Aside from one album that Laswell cobbled together in the studio, the band was primarily a live one, showing up at gigs with no rehearsal. The first time the four members played together was on stage at their first show.

Laswell produced albums for Sly and Robbie, Mick Jagger, PiL, Motörhead, Ramones, Stevie Salas, Iggy Pop, Swans, and Yoko Ono. Many of these bands afforded Laswell the opportunity to hire his working crew to record on more mainstream records. Sly and Robbie hired him to produce their 1985 album Language Barrier and 1987 album Rhythm Killers.

=== Axiom Records ===
Island Records founder Chris Blackwell gave him the opportunity to establish a label in 1990, forming Axiom Records. In addition to albums by Material that included Sly and Robbie, William S. Burroughs, Bootsy Collins, Wayne Shorter, and Bernie Worrell, he produced and released albums by Ginger Baker, Ronald Shannon Jackson, Sonny Sharrock, Nicky Skopelitis, and Umar Bin Hassan. Among the studio-based albums, Palestinian oud and violinist Simon Shaheen recorded an album of music by Egyptian composer Mohammed Abdel Wahab. Gambian virtuoso Foday Musa Suso recorded an album of dance music with his electric Kora, and Turkish saz master Talip Oezkan recorded an album. Master Musicians of Jajouka recorded an album in their village in the Rif Mountains. There were albums by Mandinka and Fulani recorded at Suso's family compound in Gambia and Gnawa music from Morocco.

Praxis featured guitarist Buckethead on Transmutation with Bootsy Collins, Bryan Mantia, Bernie Worrell, and Afrika Baby Bam from the Jungle Brothers. The album blended funk grooves and heavy metal riffs with many tracks co-written by Laswell.

Funkcronomicon included previously released tracks by Praxis and Skopelitis and tracks with members of Parliament-Funkadelic. George Clinton, Bootsy Collins, Bernie Worrell, and the last recordings of Eddie Hazel are featured prominently. The album includes DXT, Umar Bin Hassan, Abiodun Oyewole and Torture. Laswell remixed the Axiom catalog for Axiom Ambient, blending seemingly disparate tracks, releasing some of the music for Sample Material – International Free Zone, a sample library for other musicians to use as material.

=== Other labels ===
Subharmonic, conceived by Laswell and ex-Celluloid A&R Robert Soares, though not owned by Laswell, was essentially a vehicle for his projects, most in the ambient or ambient-dub categories. The label licensed a few releases from European labels for American re-release, notably Psychonavigation with Pete Namlook and Cymatic Scan with Tetsu Inoue from Pete Namlook's FAX label; Somnific Flux with Mick Harris and Cold Summer by Lull from the Sentrax label. Other collaborators included Jonah Sharp and Terre Thaemlitz. The label also released albums by Painkiller, Praxis, and Divination, an ambient dub project by Laswell. A sub-label called Strata was created with five releases in a more experimental dub/noise/ambient vein. Each of these releases (Death Cube K, Cypher 7, Azonic, and two under his alias Automaton) came in a black jewel case with the name of the project and album title printed on the front.

Three other short-lived labels were created after the demise of the Subharmonic deal. One was Meta, which was intended to be a spoken word label. The second label, Submeta, managed four releases before folding. Meta, formed with Janet Rienstra, released only one album, Baptism of Solitude with novelist Paul Bowles reading excerpts from his work over soundscapes by Laswell. Meta would appear periodically, distributed by other labels, over the next few years until it returned as a spiritual/yogic label run by Rienstra. The third label, Black Arc, was an associated label of Rykodisc focusing on "Black Rock, Cyber Funk, and Future Blues", according to a sampler. The label featured members of P-Funk on most of the albums and released albums by Bootsy Collins (under the name "Zillatron"), Bernie Worrell (Japan-only), Mutiny (Jerome Brailey), and Billy Bass.

Charged (1999) by Eraldo Bernocchi and Toshinori Kondo was released by Laswell's label Innerythmic. After a brief inactive period, the label restarted in 2001, releasing over the next few years and albums by Nicky Skopelitis, Raoul Björkenheim, James Blood Ulmer, Shin Terai, and Gonervill. Innerhythmic also released a live recording by Praxis and reissued Black Arc albums from the 1990, including Zillatron, The Last Poets' Holy Terror and Buddy Miles' Hell & Back.

Laswell moved his studio to West Orange, New Jersey and called it Orange Music Sound Studios. Under Palm's umbrella, though, four albums and a DVD set were released, including a studio album and a live 2-disc set from Tabla Beat Science centered on tabla virtuoso Zakir Hussain, son of Alla Rakha. The album included Karsh Kale, Trilok Gurtu, Ustad Sultan Khan, and Talvin Singh. This group has performed in the US, Lebanon, and Japan. Laswell, Kale, Kahn, and Hussain are usually supplemented by other musicians, which have included Gigi, DJ Disk, Serj Tankian from System of a Down, Sussan Deyhim, and artist Petulia Mattioli. In 2001 Life Space Death was released with Japanese trumpeter Toshinori Kondo, Laswell on bass, guitar, and keyboards, and words by the 14th Dalai Lama interviewed by Kondo. At the request of Blackwell, Laswell oversaw the debut album by Ethiopian singer Gigi for Palm Pictures with Wayne Shorter, Herbie Hancock, and Laswell. He also produced Abyssinia Infinite and Gold & Wax.

Laswell has stated in interviews that he met with Miles Davis a number of times and discussed working together, but busy schedules kept them from arranging such a recording before Davis' death. He remixed some of Davis's music for Panthalassa: The Music of Miles Davis 1969-1974 (Axiom, 1998).

=== 21st century ===
He signed a contract with Sanctuary Records that led to the creation of his label Nagual. He worked in the drum and bass genre, starting with Brutal Calling credited to Bill Laswell vs. Submerged that was released by Avant in 2004. He and Submerged worked together again on The Only Way to Go is Down (2006) under the name Method of Defiance. After this album, they assembled producers in drum and bass to collaborate with musicians from jazz. Evol Intent, Future Prophecies, and SPL recorded with Buckethead, Herbie Hancock, and Pharoah Sanders.

In 2010, Laswell created the label M.O.D. Technologies. Its first releases were the albums Jahbulon and Incunabula by Method of Defiance and Mesgana Ethiopia by Material with Gigi.

Along with live dates around the world with Massacre, Material, Method of Defiance, and Painkiller, Laswell travels to Japan every year for recordings and live dates, including with Tokyo Rotation.

In November 2018, he performed in Dave Douglas Uplift band at the London Jazz Festival.

Laswell suffered health problems which required hospitalization in December 2022 and prolonged recovery, which jeopardized his tenure of Orange Music Studio.

Prior to his health problems, Laswell had been recording as a duo with his long-time on-and-off collaborator Zorn releasing the albums The Cleansing (2022) and Memoria (2023) on Zorn's Tzadik label. His first venture during his health recovery in 2024 was a new Painkiller album titled Samsara with Zorn and original drummer Harris, although for this recording Harris' percussion is electronic and Zorn then Laswell layered up their contributions separately.

=== Collaborators ===
Laswell works frequently with a small group of collaborators. These include bassists Jah Wobble, Josh Werner, Jonas Hellborg, and Bootsy Collins; guitarists Buckethead and Nicky Skopelitis; keyboardists Jeff Bova and Bernie Worrell; percussionists Aïyb Dieng and Karsh Kale, and musicians from P-Funk. Robert Musso has been his chief engineer for over twenty years. Oz Fritz has occasionally filled the role. Fritz is usually Laswell's live engineer of choice, known for live mixing technique. Remixes have been done for Sting, Nine Inch Nails, Almamegretta, Scorn, Ozzy Osbourne, and Tori Amos. He has done much work for John Zorn's Tzadik Records.

In 2005, Laswell was invited to appear on the PBS series Soundstage. The show featured musicians he has played with over the years, including members of Praxis and Tabla Beat Science, Pharoah Sanders, Foday Musa Suso, Bootsy Collins, and Catfish Collins.

Laswell worked with Sony Creative Software on a box set loop library called The Bill Laswell Collection.

He has also worked with Eraldo Bernocchi and Mick Harris on a project called Equations of Eternity, which is an ambient music project started in 1995 by Eraldo. Since its members live in separate parts of the world (Mick Harris in England; Bill Laswell in the US; and Eraldo Bernocchi in Italy), the project has been predominantly studio-based, with its members recording music in their respective countries.

== See also ==
- Axiom (record label)
- List of ambient music artists
- Rock 'n' Roll Guns for Hire: The Story of the Sidemen
