= The Heart of Rock & Roll =

- Artwork for U.S. and continental European releases

Single by Huey Lewis and the News

from the album Sports
- B-side: "Workin' for a Livin'" (Live)
- Released: April 10, 1984
- Recorded: 1983
- Genre: Rock
- Length: 5:01 (album version); 3:58 (single version)
- Label: Chrysalis
- Songwriters: Johnny Colla; Huey Lewis
- Producer: Huey Lewis and the News

Huey Lewis and the News singles chronology
"I Want a New Drug" (1984)	"The Heart of Rock & Roll" (1984)	"If This Is It" (1984)

"The Heart of Rock & Roll" is a song performed by Huey Lewis and the News, released as the 3rd single from their 1983 album Sports in 1984. The single peaked at number six on the U.S. Billboard Hot 100.

== Background ==
The song was inspired by a gig the band played in Cleveland, Ohio. Cleveland, at the time was known for its rock scene, but the band remained defiant of this claim, believing their hometown of San Francisco had the better scene. After playing the show, Lewis relented, with initially the title phrase being "The heart of rock and roll is in Cleveland", based on a comment Lewis made to the band, but he changed it to "The heart of rock and roll is still beating". According to him, the message of the song is "There's real rock and roll in other places than LA or New York."

The B-side to the single is a live version of "Workin' for a Livin'". The music video was recorded in March 1984 featuring skits with the band as well as footage of concerts filmed in New York City and Los Angeles.

Upon the suggestion of their record company, the band produced various regional versions of the single in which, after mention of Detroit toward the end of the song, Lewis calls out one or more cities not in the lyrics of the album version, including New Haven, Dallas, St. Louis, and Toronto.

== Music video ==
The music video was challenging to produce, according to director Edd Griles. "The complications occurred when we filmed in New York for 13 hours straight on the Brooklyn Bridge and then later in Times Square. In Brooklyn, we had the camera in the helicopter, but the 'copter couldn't get in close enough and the bridge was windy, so the shot took a long time. In Times Square, it was only 21 degrees out and the band was dressed in either short sleeves or light jackets. As you know, filming takes time, lots of it, so Huey and the band were out there freezing their toes off in between takes," the director recalled. Also, Lewis's wife was expecting a baby, which caused delays and problems.

The video also features clips from several 1950s rock and roll greats: in chronological order, Elvis Presley, Buddy Holly, Bill Haley, Roy Orbison, Little Richard, and Chuck Berry (and his famous "duckwalk").

== Reception ==
Christopher Connelly of Rolling Stone said "a fancy-pants sax solo and some moronic lyrics sabotage the spirited 'Heart of Rock & Roll' (it's still kicking, says Huey), which should have ended a minute and a half earlier."

At the first annual MTV Video Music Awards, which aired on September 14, 1984, the song was nominated for "Best Group Video", losing to ZZ Top's "Legs". The song was also nominated for Record of the Year at the 27th Annual Grammy Awards, losing to Tina Turner's "What's Love Got to Do with It". The group performed the song at the ceremony.

In April 2009, Blender magazine listed it sixth on its list of the "50 Worst Songs Ever".

== Personnel ==
- Huey Lewis – lead vocals, harmonica
- Mario Cipollina – bass
- Johnny Colla – rhythm guitar, saxophone, backing vocals
- Bill Gibson – drums
- Chris Hayes – lead guitar
- Sean Hopper – keyboards

== Chart performance ==
Chart (1984)	Peak position
Australia (Kent Music Report)	58
Canada Top Singles (RPM)	8
Canada Retail Singles (The Record)	9
Israel (IBA)	27
New Zealand (Recorded Music NZ)	21
Spain Airplay (Top 40 Radio)	29
US Billboard Hot 100	6
US Billboard Album Rock Tracks	5
US Cash Box Top 100	7
West Germany (GfK)	71

Chart (1986)	Peak position
UK Singles (OCC)	49
UK Airplay (Music & Media)	10

Year-end chart (1984)	Rank
US Billboard Hot 100	44
US Cash Box Top 100	54
