= I Want a New Drug =

1984 single by Huey Lewis and the News

Single by Huey Lewis and the News

from the album Sports
- B-side: "Finally Found a Home"
- Released: January 3, 1984
- Recorded: 1983
- Length: 4:46 (album version); 3:29 (single edit); 5:32 (12" dance mix)
- Label: Chrysalis
- Songwriters: Chris Hayes; Huey Lewis
- Producers: Huey Lewis and the News

Huey Lewis and the News singles chronology
"Heart and Soul" (1983)	"I Want a New Drug" (1984)	"The Heart of Rock & Roll" (1984)

"I Want a New Drug" is a song by American rock band Huey Lewis and the News from their third album Sports. It was released as the album's second single in January 1984 as the follow up to their top-ten hit "Heart and Soul". The single reached number six on the U.S. Billboard Hot 100 and topped the Hot Dance Club Play chart.

== History ==
According to Lewis, he wrote the song in only a few minutes. He drove to his attorney's office and told him, "Bob, give me a pen and paper!" According to Lewis, the song is a love song, and the meaning of the word "drug" in the song was purposely open-ended. "It's really a love song. It's not a pro-drug song; it's not really even an anti-drug song. The word drug sort of gets your attention. But I think in love relationships there's more than 'I want you' or 'I need you' kind of thing." Lewis believed the definition of love was very open to interpretation depending on the listener. "I think real love contains humor and anger and confusion, all of those things."

Three versions of the song were released. The album version has two extensive guitar solos, one in the middle of the song and the other as a fade out. The single edit eliminates the first solo and has the band stop on a sustained chord which is allowed to fade out naturally. This is used in the music video and is parodied by "Weird Al" Yankovic as "I Want a New Duck". A special dance mix reduces the instrumental, gives the song a more electronic feel, and extends the song to 5 minutes and 32 seconds. Lewis was heavily influenced by "Purple Haze" by The Jimi Hendrix Experience with the recording of the song and called the guitar riff at the end of the song a "tip of the hat" to Hendrix.

The video echoes the song's origin, with Lewis waking up late, remembering he has a concert that night, and racing across San Francisco using his yellow convertible, the San Francisco ferry, and a chartered helicopter to get to the concert on time, sighting a woman twice on his way, and finding her in the front row at the concert. The woman is actress Signy Coleman, whose mother was a friend of Lewis's mother and also appears in the music video for "Heart and Soul". According to Lewis, one of the reasons the band agreed on doing the music video was to avoid a literal translation of the song and its lyrics. "The song [...] is not about drugs. It's a love song. The only way to avoid that was to sort of do 'a day in the life', which is what [the video] is."

== Reception ==
Cash Box said that it has "hard-edged guitars setting the pace above harpsichord-like synth chording and a grinding organ base."

== Lawsuit ==
When the theme song of the 1984 film Ghostbusters was released, Huey Lewis sued Ray Parker Jr. and Columbia Pictures for copyright infringement, claiming that Parker had stolen the melody from "I Want a New Drug". The three parties settled out of court. Details of the settlement (specifically, that Columbia paid Lewis a settlement) were confidential until 2001, when Lewis commented on the payment in an episode of VH1's Behind the Music. Parker subsequently sued Lewis for breaching confidentiality.

== Track listing ==
7" Chrysalis / CHS 2776 United Kingdom

1. "I Want a New Drug" – 3:29 unlabelled 7" mix
2. "Finally Found a Home" – 3:48

12" Chrysalis / CHS 12 2776 United Kingdom

1. "I Want a New Drug (Called Love)" (12" mix) – 5:32
2. "I Want a New Drug (Called Love)" (7" mix) – 3:29
3. "Heart and Soul" – 3:55
4. "(Tattoo) Giving It All Up for Love" (Phil Lynott) – 3:11

12" Chrysalis / CS 42779 Canada

1. "I Want a New Drug" (dance mix) – 5:32
2. "I Want a New Drug" (instrumental) – 4:30

7" Chrysalis / CHS 42766 Canada

1. "I Want a New Drug" - 3:29
2. "Finally Found a Home" - 3:42

12" Chrysalis / 601 194 Germany

1. "I Want a New Drug" (extended version) – 5:32
2. "Heart and Soul" (special remix) – 6:42
3. "Tell Me a Little Lie" – 4:08

12" Chrysalis / 601 343 Germany

1. "I Want a New Drug (Called Love)" (maxi mix) – 5:32
2. "I Want a New Drug (Called Love)" (simple mix) – 3:29
3. "(Tattoo) Giving It All Up for Love" – 3:11
4. "Honky Tonk Blues" (Hank Williams) – 3:16

== Charts and certifications ==
=== Weekly charts ===
Chart (1983–1984)	Peak position
Australia (Kent Music Report)	27
Canada (CHUM)	8
Canada Top Singles (RPM)	6
Canada Retail Singles (The Record)	6
Israel (IBA)	13
New Zealand (Recorded Music NZ)	10
Paraguay (UPI)	2
Spain Airplay (Top 40 Radio)	21
US Billboard Hot 100	6
US Dance/Disco Top 80 (Billboard)	1
US Top Rock Tracks (Billboard)	7
US Cash Box	5
West Germany (GfK)	27

=== Year-end charts ===
Chart (1984)	Peak position
Canada Top Singles (RPM)	51
US Billboard Hot 100	55
US Dance/Disco Top 80 (Billboard)	32
US Cash Box	41

=== Certifications ===
Region	Certification	Certified units/sales
Canada (Music Canada)	Gold	50,000^{^}
United States (RIAA)	Gold	500,000^{^}
^{^} Shipments figures based on certification alone.

== See also ==
- I Want a New Duck
- List of Billboard number-one dance singles of 1984
