= Material discography =

- Studio albums: 6
- Extended plays: 3
- Live albums: 2
- Compilation albums: 1
- Singles: 9

This is a list of releases by Material.

== Studio albums ==
Title	Album details	US Jazz
Memory Serves	Released: 1981; Label: Island; Formats: LP	37
One Down	Released: 1982; Label: Asylum, Elektra; Formats: LP	32
Seven Souls	Released: 1989; Label: Virgin; Formats: CD	—
The Third Power	Released: 1991; Label: Axiom; Formats: CD, LP	—
Hallucination Engine	Released: 1993; Label: Axiom; Formats: CD, LP	—
Intonarumori	Released: September 28, 1999; Label: Axiom, Palm Pictures; Formats: CD, LP	—
"—" denotes a recording that did not chart or was not released in that territory.

== Live albums ==
Title	Album details
Improvised Music New York 1981	Released: 1991; Label: MuWorks; Formats: CD
Live in Japan	Released: 1993; Label: Restless; Formats: CD
Live from Soundscape	Released: 1994; Label: DIW; Formats: CD
Mesgana Ethiopia	Released: 2010; Label: M.O.D. Technologies; Formats: CD

== EPs ==
Title	Album details	UK Indie
Temporary Music 1	Released: 1979; Label: ZÙ; Formats: LP	—
Temporary Music 2	Released: 1980; Label: Red; Formats: LP	43
American Songs	Released: 1981; Label: Celluloid; Formats: LP	—
"—" denotes a recording that did not chart or was not released in that territory.

== Singles ==
Title	Year	US Dance	Album
"Discourse"	1980	—	Temporary Music
"Reduction"	1981	—	Temporary Music
"Ciquri"	1981	—	American Songs
"Bustin' Out"	1981	3	Non-album single
"Memories"	1982	—	One Down
"I'm the One"	1982	43	One Down
"Time Out"	1983	—	One Down
"For a Few Dollars More"	1984	—	Non-album single
"Reality"	1991	—	The Third Power
"Playin' with Fire"	1992	—	The Third Power
"Mantra"	1993	—	Hallucination Engine
"—" denotes a recording that did not chart or was not released in that territory.

== Remix albums ==
Title	Album details
The Road to the Western Lands	Released: 1998; Label: Mercury; Formats: CD, LP

== Compilation albums ==
Title	Album details
Temporary Music	Released: 1981; Label: Celluloid; Formats: LP
Red Tracks	Released: 1985; Label: Vinyl Japan; Formats: CD, LP
Secret Life	Released: 1986; Label: Vinyl Japan; Formats: CD
The Best of Material	Released: 1998; Label: Charly Schallplatten GmbH; Formats: CD

== Collections ==
- 1991: Axiom Collection: Illuminations – contains "Cosmic Slop"
- 1993: Axiom Collection II: Manifestation – contains "Mantra" [Doors of Perception Mix] and "Playin' with Fire" [Praxis Remix / Edit]
- 1995: Axion Funk: Funkcronomicon – contains "Cosmic Slop"
- 1996: Axiom Dub: Mysteries of Creation – contains "Ghost Light / Dread Recall"
- 1996: Altered Beats: Assassin Knowledges of the Remanipulated – contains "3D-Cut Transmission"
- 1996: Tetragramton: Submerge – contains "Turn the Screw" by Material with Graham Haynes, and "Active Code" by Material with Byard Lancaster
- 1996: Myth: Dreams of the World – contains "Hermes" by Material with Umar Bin Hassan, and "Apollo" by Material with Abiodun Oyewole
- 1997: Asana – contains "Mantra"
- 1998: The Best of Material - contains 13 tracks from the Celluoid era 1979-1984
- 1998: Abstract Depressionism – contains "Downward"
- 2000: Asana 2: Moving Meditation – contains "Devata"

== Collaborations ==
This list features recordings that at least in part explicitly credits Material, and features production, writing and/or performance by members of the Material collective.

- 1982: Tribe 2 – "What I Like" – 12" single
- 1982: Phase II – "The Roxy" – 12" single
- 1983: D.ST. – "Crazy Cuts" – 12" single
- 1983: Lenny White – Attitude – tracks "My Turn to Love You"
- 1983: Herbie Hancock – Future Shock
- 1983: Herbie Hancock- "Rockit" – 7" & 12" single
- 1983: Herbie Hancock – "Future Shock" / "Earth Beat" – 12" single
- 1983: Herbie Hancock – "Autodrive" / "Chameleon" – 12" single
- 1983: Fab Five Freddy – "Une Sale Histoire: Part 1 & Part 2" – 12" single
- 1983: Nona Hendryx – Nona
- 1983: Nona Hendryx – "Transformation" – 12" single
- 1984: Bill Laswell – Baselines
- 1984: Yellowman – King Yellowman – tracks "Strong Me Strong" and "Disco Reggae"
- 1984: Yellowman – "Strong Me Strong" – 12" single
- 1984: Gil Scott-Heron – "Re-Ron" – 7" and 12" single
- 1984: Timezone featuring Afrika Bambaataa and John Lydon – "World Destruction" – 7" and 12" single
- 1984: Fab Five Freddy – "Change the Beat" – 7" and 12" single
- 1984: Herbie Hancock – Sound-System
- 1984: Herbie Hancock – "Metal Beat" – 12" single
- 1984: Herbie Hancock – "Hard Rock" – 12" single
- 1984: Shango featuring Afrika Bambaataa – Shango Funk Theology
- 1984: Shango featuring Afrika Bambaataa – "Zulu Groove" – 12" single
- 1984: Shango featuring Afrika Bambaataa – "Shango Message" – 12" single
- 1984: Nona Hendryx – The Art of Defense
- 1984: Nona Hendryx – "I Sweat" – 12" single
- 1984: Nona Hendryx – "To the Bone" – 12" single
- 1984: Genji Sawai – Sowaka
- 1984: Yla-Mago – "TVO-Rock" – 12" single
- 1985: The Last Poets – Oh my People
- 1985: The Last Poets – "Get Movin'" – 12" single
- 1985: Deadline featuring Manu Dibango – Down by Law
- 1985: B-Side – Cairo Nights – tracks "Change the Beat" and "What I Like (American Dreams)"
- 1985: Manu Dibango – Electric Africa
- 1985: Manu Dibango – "Pata Piya" – 12" single
- 1985: Mick Jagger – She's the Boss
- 1985: Mick Jagger – "Just Another Night" – 12" single
- 1985: Mick Jagger – "Lucky in Love" – 12" single
- 1985: Sly and Robbie – Language Barrier
- 1985: Sly and Robbie – "Bass and Trouble" – 12" single
- 1985: Sly and Robbie – "Get to This, Get to That" – 12" single
- 1985: Public Image Ltd. – Album / Compact Disc / Cassette
- 1986: Ginger Baker – Horses and Trees
- 1986: Toshinori Kondo – Konton
- 1986: Manu Dibango – Afrijazzy – tracks "Makossa "87 / Big Blow"
- 1986: Manu Dibango – "Makossa '87" – 7" single
- 1987: Sly and Robbie – Rhythm Killers – 12" single
- 1987: Sly and Robbie – "Boops (Here to Go)" – 12" single
- 1987: Sly and Robbie – "Fire" – 12" single
- 1987: Afrika Bambaataa and Family – The Light
- 1988: Gettovetts – Missionaries Moving
- 1988: Gettovetts – "Battle Call" – 12" single
- 1988: Herbie Hancock – Perfect Machine
- 1988: Herbie Hancock – "Vibe Alive" – 12" single
- 1989: Nicky Skopelitis – Next to Nothing
- 1992: Manu Dibango – Bao Bao
