= Howie Weinberg =

American audio engineer

Howie Weinberg is an American audio mastering engineer. Over the course of his career, he has received over 2,257 mastering credits, three TEC Awards, 21 Grammy Awards, two Juno Awards, and one Mercury Prize.

== Career ==
Weinberg mastered Herbie Hancock's 1983 album Future Shock. Other mastering works include the Beastie Boys' Licensed to Ill and Nirvana's Nevermind.

Weinberg began working in the mail room at Masterdisk in 1977, delivering recording tapes in New York City. Mastering engineer Bob Ludwig acted as his mentor. In January 2011, he left Masterdisk to set up his own mastering company in Los Angeles, Howie Weinberg Mastering, which appeared in Voyage LA's "Most Inspiring Stories" on February 11, 2021.

In 1982, Weinberg worked on the Payolas' song "Eyes of a Stranger". In 1997, Polythene by Feeder was met with critical acclaim and made the UK Top 75.

He appeared on a panel discussion at the 2009 SXSW music festival titled Producers "On Making Classic Records" sometimes working in a teaching capacity.

In 2020, Weinberg began consulting with LANDR, an online, cloud-based, automated mastering service developed by MixGenius in Montreal, Quebec. The service digitally masters uploaded audio tracks using artificial intelligence algorithms.

== Awards and nominations ==
Weinberg was nominated for the Mix Foundation's TEC Awards (Technical Excellence & Creativity) for mastering engineer in 1997. He was named among the winners for Outstanding Creative Achievement in 2003 as part of the team for Sheryl Crow's "Soak Up the Sun" and C'mon, C'mon, the album also earned two TEC Awards. In 2006, for Record Production as part of the team for Gorillaz's "Feel Good Inc". In 2001, he received a Mercury Prize for mastering PJ Harvey's album Stories from the City, Stories from the Sea.

In 2017 his work on Nirvana's "Smells Like Teen Spirit" was inducted into the Grammy Hall of Fame. That year, he also won a Juno Awards of 2017 for The Strumbellas.

=== Grammy Awards ===
Year	Artist	Album	Grammy Nominations Category	Result
1983	Herbie Hancock	Future Shock	Best R&B Instrumental Performance	Won
1984	Herbie Hancock	Sound-System	Best R&B Instrumental Performance	Won
1988	Jethro Tull	Crest of a Knave	Best Hard Rock/Metal Performance	Won
1991	LL Cool J	Mama Said Knock You Out	Best Rap Solo Performance	Won
1991	Nirvana	Nevermind	Best Alternative Music Album	Nominated
1992	Arrested Development	3 Years, 5 Months and 2 Days in the Life Of...	Best New Artist	Won
1992	Arrested Development	3 Years, 5 Months and 2 Days in the Life Of...	Best Rap Performance Duo or Group	Won
1996	Smashing Pumpkins	Mellon Collie and the Infinite Sadness	Best Hard Rock Performance	Won
1996	Smashing Pumpkins	Mellon Collie and the Infinite Sadness	Album of the Year	Nominated
1997	Smashing Pumpkins	The End Is the Beginning Is the End	Best Hard Rock Performance	Won
1997	U2	Pop	Best Rock Album	Won
1998	Garbage	Version 2.0	Album of the Year	Nominated
1998	Garbage	Version 2.0	Best Rock Album	Nominated
1998	Beastie Boys	Intergalactic	Best Alternative Music Performance	Won
1998	Beastie Boys	Intergalactic	Best Rap Performance.	Won
2000	Madonna	Music	Best Pop Vocal Album	Nominated
2001	PJ Harvey	Stories from the City, Stories from the Sea	Best Rock Album.	Nominated
2002	Elvis Costello	When I Was Cruel	Best Rock Album	Nominated
2002	Elvis Costello	When I Was Cruel	Best Alternative Music Album	Nominated
2003	Sheryl Crow	C'mon, C'mon	Best Female Rock Vocal Performance	Won
2003	Sheryl Crow	C'mon, C'mon	Best Pop Collaboration with Vocals	Nominated
2003	Sheryl Crow	C'mon, C'mon	Best Rock Album	Nominated
2003	Sheryl Crow	C'mon, C'mon	Grammy Award for Best Engineered Album, Non-Classical	Nominated
2006	Gustavo Cerati	Ahí vamos	Best Rock Solo Vocal Album - Latin Grammy	Won
2006	Gustavo Cerati	Ahí vamos	Best Rock Song-Latin Grammy	Won
2006	Yeah Yeah Yeahs	Show Your Bones	Best Alternative Music Album	Nominated
2006	UB40	Who You Fighting For?	Best Reggae Album	Nominated
2008	Daft Punk	Alive 2007	Best Electronic/Dance Album	Won
2013	Fiona Apple	The Idler Wheel...,	Best Alternative Music Album.	Nominated
2017	Twenty One Pilots	Blurryface	Best Pop Duo/Group Performance	Won
2019	Mon Laferte	Norma	Best Alternative Music Album - Latin Grammy	Won
2020	Gary Clark Jr.	This Land	Best Contemporary Blues Album	Won
2020	Gary Clark Jr.	This Land	Best Rock Performance	Won
2020	Gary Clark Jr.	This Land	Best Rock Song	Won

== Personal life ==
Weinberg married Rachel Felder, the director of artists and repertory at Columbia Records, in July 1999.

Weinberg's brother Marty (died Oct. 2018) was one of the first Grateful Dead fans who recorded and distributed the band's shows.

== Partial discography ==
- ...And You Will Know Us by the Trail of Dead – Source Tags & Codes (2002)
- 13 Engines – Perpetual Motion Machine (1993)
- 24-7 Spyz – Heavy Metal Soul by the Pound (1996)
- 2nd II None – 2nd II None (1991)
- 3 Doors Down – Seventeen Days (2005)
- 3 Colours Red – The Union of Souls (2004)
- 3rd Bass – The Cactus Album (1989), Derelicts of Dialect (1991)
- 54-40 – Since When (1998)
- 7horse – Songs for a Voodoo Wedding (2014), Livin in a Bitch of a World (2016)
- A Dozen Furies – A Concept from Fire (2005)
- A Giant Dog – Pile (2016)
- A Perfect Murder – Unbroken (2004), Strength Through Vengeance (2005)
- A – 'A' vs. Monkey Kong (2000)
- Abiodun Oyewole – 25 Years (1996)
- Acid Test – Drop (1993)
- Active Child – You Are All I See (2011), Rapor (2013)
- Adele Bertei – Little Lives (1988)
- Aerosmith – Done with Mirrors (1985)
- After the Fall – Always Forever Now (2005)
- Alabama 3 – Exile on Coldharbour Lane (1997)
- Aleks Syntek – 89–99 (2000)
- Alice Cooper – The Last Temptation (1994)
- Alien Crime Syndicate – Dust to Dirt (2000), From the Word Go (2000), Ten Songs in the Key of Betrayal (2004)
- All Hail the Yeti – All Hail the Yeti (2012)
- The Almighty – Psycho-Narco (2001)
- AM Taxi – We Don't Stand a Chance (2010)
- American Hi-Fi – Blood & Lemonade (2014)
- Amusement Parks on Fire – Out of the Angeles (2005)
- Andrew Dice Clay – 40 Too Long (1993)
- Andrew W.K. – I Get Wet (2001), The Wolf (2003)
- Angelo Badalamenti – Soundtrack from Twin Peaks (1990)
- Antenna – Hideout (1993)
- Anthrax – Spreading the Disease (1985)
- Anti-Flag – For Blood and Empire (2006)
- Apoptygma Berzerk – Rocket Science (2009)
- Arctic Monkeys – Humbug (2009)
- Arid – Little Things of Venom (2000)
- Arlen Roth – Arlen Roth (1987)
- Arrested Development – 3 Years, 5 Months & 2 Days in the Life Of... (1992), Zingalamaduni (1994)
- Arsonists – As the World Burns (1999)
- Art Bergmann – Crawl with Me (1988), Art Bergmann (1991)
- Arto Lindsay – Mundo Civilizado (1996)
- Ash – Meltdown (2004)
- Atreyu – The Curse (2004), Lead Sails Paper Anchor (2007), Long Live (2015)
- Authority Zero – Andiamo (2004)
- Autopilot Off – Autopilot Off (2002), Make a Sound (2004)
- Awaken the Empire – Aurora (2015)
- Axel Bauer – Simple Mortel (1998)
- B'z – Action (2007)
- Babasónicos – Dopádromo (1996), Miami (2000), Jessico (2002), Infame (2004)
- Babe the Blue Ox – People (1996)
- Baby Chaos – Safe Sex Designer Drugs & the Death of Rock 'n' Roll (1995)
- Babylon A.D. – Nothing Sacred (1992)
- Bad Brains – Rise (1993), Black Dots (1996)
- Barkmarket – Vegas Throat (1990), Gimmick (1993)
- Barrington Levy – Turning Point (1992)
- Beastie Boys – Licensed to Ill (1986), Hello Nasty (1998)
- Beatsteaks – Launched (1999)
- Ben Folds – Way to Normal (2008)
- Ben Folds Five – Whatever and Ever Amen (1997), Naked Baby Photos (1998), The Unauthorized Biography of Reinhold Messner (1999)
- Ben Kweller – Go Fly a Kite (2012)
- Ben Lee – Breathing Tornados (1999), Hey You. Yes You. (2002)
- Best Coast – California Nights (2015)
- Biffy Clyro – Puzzle (2007), Only Revolutions (2009)
- Big Country – The Crossing (1983)
- Big Head Todd and the Monsters – Strategem (1994)
- Big Sugar – Hemi-Vision (1996), Heated (1999), Hit & Run (2003)
- Billy Corgan – TheFutureEmbrace (2005)
- Björk – Family Tree (2002)
- Blind Melon – Nico (1996)
- Blonde Redhead – Fake Can Be Just as Good (1997), In an Expression of the Inexpressible (1998)
- Blues Traveler – Save His Soul (1993), Live from the Fall (1996)
- Blur – 13 (1999), Think Tank (2003)
- Bob Mould – Workbook (1989)
- Boo-Yaa T.R.I.B.E. – New Funky Nation (1990)
- Boss Hog – Boss Hog (1995)
- Bowling for Soup – The Great Burrito Extortion Case (2006)
- Brand New Heavies – Get Used to It (2006)
- BT – ESCM (1997)
- Buckethead – Bucketheadland (1992), Giant Robot (1994)
- Built to Spill – Perfect from Now On (1997)
- Burn – Do or Die (2017)
- Butch Walker – The Rise and Fall of Butch Walker and the Let's-Go-Out-Tonites (2006), Afraid of Ghosts (2015)
- Cage the Elephant – Cage the Elephant (2009), Thank You, Happy Birthday (2011)
- Camper Van Beethoven – Key Lime Pie (1989)
- Caviar – The Thin Mercury Sound (2004)
- Cheap Trick – Lap of Luxury (1988)
- Chevelle – Wonder What's Next (2002)
- Cidadão Instigado – Fortaleza (2015)
- Circa Survive – Blue Sky Noise (2010)
- CKY – Infiltrate•Destroy•Rebuild (2002), An Answer Can Be Found (2005), Carver City (2009)
- The Clash – Combat Rock (1982), Cut the Crap (1985)
- Clutch – The Elephant Riders (1998), Jam Room (2000)
- Coheed and Cambria – The Afterman: Ascension (2012), The Afterman: Descension (2013)
- Cold – Cold (1998)
- Cop Shoot Cop – Ask Questions Later (1993), Release (1994)
- Cracker – The Golden Age (1996)
- Craig G – Now, That's More Like It (1991)
- Crash Test Dummies – Give Yourself a Hand (1999), I Don't Care That You Don't Mind (2001)
- Creed – My Own Prison (1997)
- The Crystal Method – Vegas (1997)
- The Cult – Electric (1987)
- Cyclone Temple – I Hate Therefore, I Am (1991)
- Cypress Hill – Cypress Hill (1991)
- Damageplan – New Found Power (2004)
- Danzig – Danzig (1988), Danzig III: How the Gods Kill (1992)
- Das Pop – Das Pop (2009)
- David Lee Roth – Crazy From The Heat (1985)
- Def Leppard – On Through the Night (1980), High 'n' Dry (1981), Pyromania (1983), Hysteria (1987)
- Deftones – White Pony (2000), Saturday Night Wrist (2006), Gore (2016)
- Deltron 3030 – Deltron 3030 (2000), Event 2 (2013)
- Dire Straits – Love over Gold (1982)
- Disagree – To Prevent the Earth from Moving with You (2009)
- Disturbed – The Sickness (2000), Believe (2002)
- The Disposable Heroes of Hiphoprisy – Hypocrisy Is the Greatest Luxury (1992)
- DJ Quik – Quik Is the Name (1991)
- Dog Eat Dog – All Boro Kings (1994)
- Dope – Felons and Revolutionaries (1999)
- Double X Posse – Put Ya Boots On (1992)
- Dream Theater – When Dream and Day Unite (1989), Train of Thought (2003), Live at Budokan (2004)
- Dredg – Chuckles and Mr. Squeezy (2011)
- Dropkick Murphys – Blackout (2003)
- Dynamite Hack – Superfast (2000)
- Earshot – Two (2004)
- East Cameron Folkcore – For Sale (2013)
- Easterhouse – Contenders (1986)
- Eddie Money – Can't Hold Back (1986)
- Elefant – The Black Magic Show (2006)
- Elliott Waits For No One – EWFNO- Ghost Behind The rainbow (2018) EWFNO/ CMurder – Mama's Bad Boy (2019)
- Elvis Costello – When I Was Cruel (2002)
- End of Fashion – End of Fashion (2006)
- Eve's Plum – Envy (1993)
- Everlast – Eat at Whitey's (2000)
- Extreme – Extreme (1989)
- Faith No More – King for a Day... Fool for a Lifetime (1995), Album of the Year (1997)
- Fastball – Make Your Mama Proud (1996)
- Fear Factory – Archetype (2004)
- Fear of Pop – Fear of Pop: Volume 1 (1998)
- Feeder – Polythene (1997)
- Feist – The Reminder (2007)
- Filter – Crazy Eyes (2016)
- Finch – Back to Oblivion (2014)
- Finger Eleven – Tip (1998)
- Fiona Apple – The Idler Wheel... (2012)
- Fishbone – Give a Monkey a Brain and He'll Swear He's the Center of the Universe (1993)
- Foster the People – "Pumped Up Kicks" (2010)
- The Frames – Dance the Devil (1999)
- Franz Ferdinand – You Could Have It So Much Better (2005)
- The Fray – Helios (2014)
- Fuel – Natural Selection (2003)
- Funeral for a Friend – Casually Dressed & Deep in Conversation (2003)
- Gang Starr – Step in the Arena (1990), Daily Operation (1992)
- Garbage – Garbage (1995), Version 2.0 (1998)
- Geddy Lee – My Favourite Headache (2000)
- Geto Boys – The Geto Boys (1990)
- Gizmachi – The Imbuing (2005)
- GOD – Possession (1992)
- Gorillaz – Gorillaz (2001), Demon Days (2005), Plastic Beach (2010)
- Gustavo Cerati – Ahi Vamos (2006)
- Handsome Boy Modeling School – So... How's Your Girl? (1999), White People (2004)
- Hammerbox – Numb (1993)
- Hed PE – Hed PE (1997)
- Helmet – Meantime (1992), Betty (1994), Dead to the World (2016)
- Herbie Hancock – Future Shock (1983), Sound-System (1984), Perfect Machine (1999)
- The Human League – Hysteria (1984)
- Hüsker Dü – Candy Apple Grey (1986)
- Ian Brown – Music of the Spheres (2001), Solarized (2004)
- Ice Cube – AmeriKKKa's Most Wanted (1990)
- Iggy Pop – Instinct (1988), Beat 'Em Up (2001)
- Irish Leo – Wicked Cruel Chicken (2001)
- Iron Maiden – The Essential Iron Maiden (2005)
- James Brown – In the Jungle Groove (1986)
- The Jayhawks – Hollywood Town Hall (1992)
- Jeff Buckley – Grace (1994)
- The Jesus Lizard – Show (1996), The Jesus Lizard (1998), Blue (1998)
- Jon Spencer Blues Explosion – Now I Got Worry (1996), Acme (1998), Xtra-Acme USA (1999), Damage (2004)
- John Mellencamp – Uh-huh (1983)
- Johnny Goudie & The Little Champions – El Payaso (2009)
- Joyce Sims – Come into My Life (1987)
- Juanes – Loco de Amor (2014)
- Judgment Night – soundtrack (1993)
- Just-Ice – The Desolate One (1989)
- Kasabian – West Ryder Pauper Lunatic Asylum (2009), Velociraptor! (2011)
- The Killers – Sam's Town (2006), Sawdust (2007)
- Kittie – Spit (2000)
- Korn – Untouchables (2002)
- Kurtis Blow – Kurtis Blow (1980), Deuce (1981), Tough (1982), Party Time? (1983), The Best Rapper on the Scene (1983), Ego Trip (1984)
- Kyuss – Blues for the Red Sun (1992)
- L'Arc-en-Ciel – Smile (2004), Awake (2005), Kiss (2007)
- Less Than Jake – GNV FLA (2008)
- Limp Bizkit – Three Dollar Bill, Yall$ (1997), Significant Other (1999), Gold Cobra (2011)
- LL Cool J – Bigger and Deffer (1987), Walking with a Panther (1989), Mama Said Knock You Out (1990), 14 Shots to the Dome (1993)
- Luna Sea – Lunacy (2000)
- Luxtorpeda – MYWASWYNAS (2016)
- Major Lazer – Free the Universe (2013)
- Marmaduke Duke – Duke Pandemonium (2009)
- Material – Memory Serves (1982), One Down (1982), Seven Souls (1989), The Third Power (1991), Live in Japan (1993), Hallucination Engine (1994), Temporary Music (2017)
- Manowar – Kings of Metal (1988)
- Marilyn Manson - One Assassination Under God - Chapter 1 (2024)
- Material Issue – Destination Universe (1992)
- The Mescaleros – Streetcore (2003)
- Metallica – Hardwired... To Self-Destruct (2016)
- Metallica – Master of Puppets (Remastered 2017)
- Mike DeFoy – Sky Pilot - Volume 1 (1992)
- The Mighty Mighty Bosstones – Pay Attention (2000)
- The Mint Chicks – Crazy? Yes! Dumb? No! (2006), Bad Buzz EP (2010)
- Modest Mouse – Good News for People Who Love Bad News (2004), We Were Dead Before the Ship Even Sank (2007)
- Monza – Van God Los (2001)
- Monza – Grand (2004)
- Motörhead – Ace of Spades (1980)
- Mudvayne – L.D. 50 (2000)
- Muse – Absolution (2003), Black Holes and Revelations (2006)
- Mushroomhead – A Wonderful Life (2020)
- My Sister's Machine – Diva (1992), Wallflower (1993)
- The Naked Brothers Band – I Don't Want to Go to School (2008)
- Nice & Smooth – Nice & Smooth (1989)
- Nirvana – Nevermind (1991)
- Nona Hendryx – The Art of Defense (1984)
- Norma Jean – O God, the Aftermath (2005)
- Ozzy Osbourne – Bark at the Moon (1983)
- Pantera – Cowboys from Hell (1990), Vulgar Display of Power (1992), Reinventing the Steel (2000)
- Papa Roach – Infest (2000)
- Pixies – Bossanova (1990), Minotaur (2009)
- Powerman 5000 – Anyone for Doomsday? (2001)
- Pray for the Soul of Betty – Pray for the Soul of Betty (2005)
- Public Enemy – Yo! Bum Rush the Show (1987), Fear of a Black Planet (1990)
- PUP – The Dream Is Over (2016)
- Pyogenesis – Unpop (1997)
- The Raconteurs – Steady, As She Goes (2006)
- Rammstein – Mutter (2001), Reise, Reise (2004), Rosenrot (2005)
- Ramones – Brain Drain (1989), Loco Live (1991)
- Rancid – ...And Out Come the Wolves (1995)
- Redlight King – Irons in the Fire (2013)
- Red Hot Chili Peppers – The Uplift Mofo Party Plan (1987), Mother's Milk (1989), Blood Sugar Sex Magik (1991)
- The Replacements – Hootenanny (1983), Let It Be (1984)
- Reuben – In Nothing We Trust (2007)
- Rise Robots Rise – Rise Robots Rise (1992)
- Rob Base and DJ E-Z Rock – It Takes Two (1988)
- Rollins Band – The End of Silence (1992), Weight (1994)
- Rumpletilskinz – What Is a Rumpletilskin? (1993)
- Run–D.M.C. – Tougher Than Leather (1988), Down with the King (1993)
- Rush – Fly by Night (1975), A Farewell to Kings (1977), Permanent Waves (1980), Moving Pictures (1981), Vapor Trails (2002)
- Ryan Adams – Ryan Adams (2014)
- Saliva – Survival of the Sickest (2004), Blood Stained Love Story (2007)
- Santana – Viva Santana! (1988)
- Saosin – In Search of Solid Ground (2009)
- Scorpions – Lovedrive (1979), Blackout (1982)
- Screaming Trees – Sweet Oblivion (1992), Dust (1996)
- Sense Field – Building (1996)
- Sepultura – Arise (1991)
- Sevendust – Sevendust (1997)
- Sexepil – Sugar for the Soul (1995)
- Sheryl Crow – C'mon, C'mon (2002)
- Shihad – Love Is the New Hate (2005)
- Shinedown – Leave a Whisper (2003)
- Skunk Anansie – Stoosh (1996), Post Orgasmic Chill (1999)
- Slayer – Reign in Blood (1986), South of Heaven (1988), Seasons in the Abyss (1990), Diabolus in Musica (1998), Repentless (2015)
- The Smashing Pumpkins – Gish (1991), Siamese Dream (1993), Mellon Collie and the Infinite Sadness (1995), Adore (1998), Machina/The Machines of God (2000), Monuments to an Elegy (2014)
- Sneaker Pimps – Splinter (1999)
- Sonic Youth – Sister (1987), Daydream Nation (1988), Goo (1990), Dirty (1992), Experimental Jet Set, Trash and No Star (1994)
- Soul Asylum – Let Your Dim Light Shine (1995), Delayed Reaction (2012), Change of Fortune (2016)
- Soundgarden – Louder Than Love (1989), Badmotorfinger (1991)
- Special Ed – Youngest in Charge (1989), Legal (1990)
- Spoon – Gimme Fiction (2005), Ga Ga Ga Ga Ga (2007), Transference (2010), They Want My Soul (2014), Hot Thoughts (2017)
- The Spindle Sect – "Bubonic Tronic" (2012)
- Sponge – Rotting Piñata (1994), Wax Ecstatic (1996), For All the Drugs in the World (2003)
- Spookey Ruben – Modes of Transportation Vol. 1 (1995)
- Stabbing Westward – Stabbing Westward (2001)
- Staind – Dysfunction (1999)
- Starset – SILOS (2025)
- Suede – Bloodsports (2013)
- Sum 41 – Half Hour of Power (2000), Does This Look Infected? (2002)
- Super Furry Animals – Guerrilla (1999)
- The Swear – Every Trick's a Good One (2005)
- Swervedriver – Mezcal Head (1993)
- Super Lover Cee & Casanova Rud – Girls I Got 'Em Locked (1988)
- Swans – The Burning World (1989), White Light from the Mouth of Infinity (1991), Love of Life (1992)
- Tad – Live Alien Broadcasts (1995)
- Taking Back Sunday – Taking Back Sunday (2011)
- Taproot – Our Long Road Home (2008)
- Tegan and Sara – So Jealous (2004)
- Terminator X – Terminator X & The Valley of the Jeep Beets (1991)
- The The – Solitude (1993), Dusk (1993), Hanky Panky (1995), NakedSelf (2000), Soul Mining (2002), Infected (2002), Mind Bomb (2002)
- This Land (Gary Clark Jr. album) (2019)
- Thirty Seconds to Mars – Love, Lust, Faith and Dreams (2013), America (2018)
- Triggerfinger - By Absence of the Sun (2014)
- Thrice – The Artist in the Ambulance (2003), The Alchemy Index Vols. I & II (2007), The Alchemy Index Vols. III & IV (2008), Beggars (2009), Major/Minor (2011)
- Toadies – Rubberneck (1995), Hell Below/Stars Above (2001)
- Tom Waits – Franks Wild Years (1987)
- Train – California 37 (2012)
- Twelve Foot Ninja – Smoke Bomb EP (2010)
- Twenty One Pilots – Vessel (2013)
- U2 – Pop (1997)
- Unkle – Never, Never, Land (2003), War Stories (2007)
- The Vaccines – Come of Age (2012)
- Van Halen – A Different Kind of Truth (2012)
- Violent Femmes – Why Do Birds Sing? (1991), Freak Magnet (2000)
- Ween – Pure Guava (1992), Chocolate and Cheese (1994), White Pepper (2000), Quebec (2003), La Cucaracha (2007)
- The White Stripes – Get Behind Me Satan (2005)
- Xu Xu Fang – Daylong Secret (2016)
- Xzibit – Napalm (2012)
- Yeah Yeah Yeahs – Fever to Tell (2003), Show Your Bones (2006)
- Young Guns – Ones and Zeros (2015)
- Yungblud – Idols (2025)
- Zwan – Mary Star of the Sea (2003)
