= Lost in the Translation =

Studio album by Axiom Ambient
- Released: November 8, 1994
- Studio: Greenpoint (Brooklyn)
- Genre: Ambient
- Length: 121:33
- Label: Axiom
- Producer: Bill Laswell

Bill Laswell chronology
Jihad (Points of Order) (1994)	Lost in the Translation (1994)	Outer Dark (1994)

Professional ratings
Review scores
Source	Rating
AllMusic	4/5 stars
Down Beat	4/5 stars

Lost in the Translation is an album by American composer Bill Laswell, issued under the moniker Axiom Ambient. It was released on November 8, 1994, by Axiom.

== Overview ==
In The Ambient Century (2000), Mark Prendergast describes Lost in the Translation as "an overlapping and intertwining collage of eight symphonic Ambient movements containing some of the most impressive music from the Axiom catalogue", noting that the Orb and Tetsu Inoue are both represented. Rick Anderson of AllMusic describes it as the zenith of Laswell's musical interest in "cybermysticism". Trouser Press named it one of three "star-packed repertory extravaganzas devoted to specific genre indulgence" in Laswell's catalogue, noting that it uses non-ambient musicians to "enter that realm."

The track "Peace in Essaouira", writes Prendergast, "was mixed for the late Eddie Hazel and Sonny Sharrock and featured the playing of both guitarists in a sublime dedication to Jimi Hendrix's 1967 ballad 'Little Wing'. The track concluded with the saxophonist Pharoah Sanders playing a haunting ballad for Sharrock in the coastal Moroccan town of Essaouira."

== Track listing ==
Disc one
No.	Title	Writer(s)	Length
1.	"Eternal Drift" (Below the Boundaries of the Inner Station/Eternal Thaemlitz Curse/ Light of Darkness/Construct Over Destiny/Sacred Drift)	Laswell, Skopelitis, Thaemlitz	15:53
2.	"Peace" (My Soul to Keep/Who Does She Hope to Be?/Peace in Essaouria)	Hazel, Sanders, Sharrock	17:11
3.	"Aum" (Soul Searcher/Praying Mantra (Second Attention)/Tarab Scan/Ritual in Transfigured Time)	Caroline, Lakshminarayana, Rao, Shankar, Skopelitis, Wobble	17:37
4.	"Cosmic Trigger" (Through the Flames/Cosmic Slop/Animal Behavior)	Buckethead, Collins, Laswell, Worrell	16:19

Disc two
No.	Title	Writer(s)	Length
1.	"Dharmapala" (Along a Ghostly Path/Before Dark/Knox Om Pax)	Hellborg, Wahab	14:35
2.	"Flash of Panic" (Pipes of Pan/Up Above the World/Under Black Skies/Out of the Ether)	Attar, Baker, Laswell, Skopelitis	15:17
3.	"Holy Mountain" (Assassin's Dream/Blues in the East/Alamut Transmission)	Laswell, Sola	16:41
4.	"Ruins" (Bubble Wrap mix)	Inoue, Laswell	8:00

== Personnel ==
Adapted from the Lost in the Translation liner notes. Musicians

- Tetsu Inoue – effects ("Ruins")
- Bill Laswell – effects, producer
- The Orb – effects ("Aum")
- Terre Thaemlitz – effects ("Eternal Drift")

Technical

- Layng Martine – assistant engineer
- Robert Musso – engineering
- Shinro Ohtake – cover art

== Release history ==
Region	Date	Label	Format	Catalog
United States	1994	Axiom	CD, LP	314-524 053
