= American Songs =

EP by Material
- Released: June 17, 1981
- Recorded: March, 1981
- Genre: No wave, post-disco, post-punk
- Label: Celluloid, CEL 6596
- Producer: Material with Martin Bisi

Material chronology
Temporary Music (1981)	American Songs (1981)	Memory Serves (1981)

American Songs is a 1981 EP by the New York based No Wave music group Material.

== Track listing ==
1. "Ciquiri" (Discomix) (Bill Laswell, Fred Maher, Michael Beinhorn, Robert Quine) – 6:22
2. "Detached" (Laswell, Maher, Beinhorn, Quine) – 5:02
3. "Discourse" (Laswell, Beinhorn, Cliff Cultreri, Bill Bacon – 4:05
4. "Slow Murder" (Laswell, Beinhorn, Cultreri, Bacon) – 3:59

== Personnel ==
- Bill Laswell – bass
- Michael Beinhorn – synthesizer, vocals
- Fred Maher – drums, guitar, vocals (tracks 1 and 2)
- Cliff Cultreri – guitar (tracks 3 and 4)
- Bill Bacon – drums (tracks 3 and 4)

Additional personnel

- Robert Quine – guitar (tracks 1 and 2)

== Production ==
- Tracks 1 and 2 recorded March 1 & 2, 1981. Produced by Material with Martin Bisi.
- Tracks 3 and 4 recorded in March, 1980. Produced by Material with Martin Bisi.

== Release history ==
- American Songs – 1981 – Red Rec., EP 001 (12")
- American Songs – 1981 – Celluloid, CEL 6596 (12")
- "Ciquiri"/"Detached" single – 1982 – Red Rec., RS 12012 (12²)
- "Discourse"/"Slow Murder" single – 1980 – Red Rec., 45001 (7")
- "Discourse"/"Slow Murder" single – 198? – Celluloid, CEL 6219 (7")
