= Secret Life =

Secret Life, The Secret Life or The Secret Life of... may refer to:

== Music ==
- Secret Life (band), an English R&B/house and pop band from the 1990s
- The Secret Life Of... (album), an album by the Veronicas
- Secret Life (album), 2023 album by Fred Again and Brian Eno
- Secret Life (Material album), 1986
- "Secret Life" (Bleachers song), 2021
- "Secret Life" (Redd Kross song), 1997
- "Secret Life" (Jack Savoretti song), 2021
- "Secret Life", a song by The Corrs from Forgiven, Not Forgotten
- "Secret Life", a song by Debbie Harry from Rockbird
- "Secret Life", a song by Soft Cell from Non-Stop Erotic Cabaret

== Other uses ==
- The Secret Life Of..., a television food/cookery show on the US Food Network
- The Secret Life of Machines, a series of tech documentary programmes named The Secret Life of..., the ellipsis being the episode subject
- The Secret Life: Jeffrey Dahmer, a 1993 film by David R. Bowen
- The Secret Life, a play by Harley Granville-Barker

== See also ==
- My Secret Life (disambiguation)
- The Secret of Life
- Secret Lives (disambiguation)
