= Bustin' Out (EP) =

EP by Material
- Released: 1981
- Recorded: OAO Studio, Brooklyn, New York and RPM Sound Studio, New York City
- Label: Celluloid, CEL 6592
- Producer: Material with Martin Bisi

Material chronology
Memory Serves (1981)	Bustin' Out (1981)	One Down (1982)

Professional ratings
Review scores
Source	Rating
The Rolling Stone Jazz Record Guide	3/5 stars

"Bustin' Out" is a 1981 EP by the New York based No Wave music group Material. The vocals here are by Nona Hendryx. This single sees the band move further away from their experimental beginnings and in a funkier, more club-friendly direction.

== Track listing ==
1. "Bustin' Out" (Bill Laswell, Michael Beinhorn, Fred Maher, Nona Hendryx, Ronny Drayton, T. Scott) – 3:40
2. "Over and Over" [Long Version] (Laswell, Beinhorn, Maher, Scott) – 5:36
3. "Bustin' Out" [Long Version] (Laswell, Beinhorn, Maher, Hendryx, Drayton, Scott) – 8:06

=== Promo 12" ===
1. "Bustin' out" – 8:27
2. "Bustin' out" [Heavy Metal Mix] – 8:06

=== 2004 Release ===
1. "Bustin' out" [Remix] – 7:50
2. "It's a holiday" [Remix] – 6:50
3. "Over and over" – 5:35

== Personnel ==
- Bill Laswell – basses
- Michael Beinhorn – synthesizers
- Fred Maher – drums

Additional personnel

- Nona Hendryx – vocals
- Ronny Drayton – guitar

== Production ==
- Recorded at OAO Studio, Brooklyn, New York and RPM Sound Studio, New York City. Produced by Material with Martin Bisi.

== Release history ==
- 1981 – Ze Records / Celluloid, CEL 6592 (12")
- 1981 – Ze Records / Island, IS 49741 (7", only tracks 1 + 2)
- 1981 – Ze Records / Island, 12WIP 6713 (12", only Tracks 2 + 3)
- 1981 – Promo 12" – Island (USA), PRO A 958
- 2004 Release – Ze Records (USA), ZEREC 1207 (12")
