= Live from Soundscape (Material album) =

Live album by Material
- Released: 1994
- Recorded: Soundscape, New York, on October 16, 1981
- Genre: No Wave
- Length: 61:58
- Label: DIW Japan, 389
- Producer: Verna Gillis

Material chronology
Seven Souls (1989)	Live from Soundscape (1994)	The Third Power (1991)

Professional ratings
Review scores
Source	Rating
Allmusic	link

Live from Soundscape is a 1994 released album of a live 1981 performance by the New York based No Wave music group Material.

The album is something of an oddity in the discography of Material. While most of their albums explored a fusion of funk, no-wave, world music and jazz, Live from Soundscape is an example of non-idiomatic free improvisation. The band, led by bassist Bill Laswell, recorded live onstage with no pre-planned melodies, rhythms or themes.

== Track listing ==
1. "Chaos Never Died" (Material) – 61:58

== Personnel ==
- Bill Laswell – electric bass
- Michael Beinhorn – electronics
- Fred Frith – guitar
- Charles Noyes – percussion
- David Moss – percussion
- Mark Miller – percussion

== Production ==
- Recorded live at Soundscape, New York, on October 16, 1981.
- Produced by Verna Gillis.

== Release history ==
- 1994 – DIW Japan, 389 (CD)
