= Axiom Collection =

Studio album by Various
- Released: 1991-6
- Genres: New wave, ambient, funk, dub
- Label: Axiom / Island

The Axiom Collection is a series of compilation albums from the Axiom record label released between 1991 and 1996.

The first collection, Illuminations, collects one track from each of the label's first ten albums. The second collection, Manifestation, contains mainly non-album mixes and edits.

Subsequent collections were released to highlight specific music forms, and in the main contained new material.

== Axiom Collection: Illuminations ==
=== Track listing ===
1. Simon Shaheen – "Sittel Habayeb" – 6:35 – taken from The Music of Mohamed Abdel Wahab
2. Material – "Cosmic Slop" – 5:15 – taken from The Third Power
3. Gnawa Music of Marrakesh – "Baba L'Rouami" – 3:05 – taken from Night Spirit Masters
4. Jonas Hellborg – "Saut-E Sarmad" – 3:28 – taken from The Word
5. Mandingo – "Powerhouse" [Edit] – 4:56 – taken from New World Power
6. Sonny Sharrock – "As we used to sing" – 7:45 – taken from Ask the Ages
7. Fulani Music of the Gambia – "Nayo" – 3:11 – taken from Ancient Heart
8. Ginger Baker – "Under black Skies" – 6:59 – taken from Middle Passage
9. L. Shankar – "Ragam, Tanam, Pallavi Ragam: Kapi, Seethalakshmi Talam: 6 3/4 Beats" [Edit] – 5:20 – taken from Soul Searcher
10. Ronald Shannon Jackson – "Elders" [Edit] – 5:08 – taken from Red Warrior
11. Mandinka Music of the Gambia – "Hamaba" – 4:40 – taken from Ancient Heart
12. Shankar – "Ragam: Kapi" [Edit] – 8:0 – taken from Soul Searcher

== Axiom Collection II: Manifestation ==
=== Track listing ===
1. Material – "Mantra" [Doors of Perception Mix] (Lakshminarayanan Shankar, Caroline, Bill Laswell) – 8:53 – originally on Hallucination Engine
2. Praxis – "Animal Behavior" [Transmutation Video Version] (Laswell, Bootsy Collins, Buckethead) – 4:45 – originally on Transmutation (Mutatis Mutandis)
3. Bahia Black – "Captiao Do Asfalto" (Carlinhos Brown) – 5.05 – originally on Ritual Beating System
4. Material – "Reality Dub" [Virtual Reality Mix] (Shabba Ranks, Laswell, Sly Dunbar, Robbie Shakespeare) – 7:22 – originally on The Third Power
5. Nicky Skopelitis – "Tarab Dub" [Wasteland Mix] (Nicky Skopelitis, Laswell, Jah Wobble) – 10:11 – originally on Ekstasis
6. Master Musicians of Jajouka featuring Bachir Attar – "A Habibi Ouajee T'Allel Allaillya" (Hadj Abdelesalam Attar) – 4:12 – originally on Apocalypse Across the Sky
7. Henry Threadgill – "Better Wrapped / Better Unwrapped" [Edit] (Henry Threadgill) – 4:28 – originally on Too Much Sugar for a Dime
8. Mandingo – "Lanmbasy Dub" [Kora in Hell Mix] (Foday Musa Suso) – 9:44 – originally on New World Power
9. Gnawa Music of Marrakesh – "Baniya" (traditional) – 5:59 – originally on Night Spirit Masters
10. Praxis – "Dead Man Walking" [Edit] (Laswell, Collins, Bernie Worrell, Bryan Mantia, Buckethead, Nathaniel Hall) – 3:33 – originally on Transmutation
11. Material – "Playin' With Fire" [Praxis Remix / Edit] (Hall, Michael Small, Laswell, Collins, Dunbar, Shakespeare) – 3:57 – originally on The Third Power
12. Talip Ozkan – "Feridem" (traditional) – 3:59 – originally on The Dark Fire

== Axiom Ambient: Lost in the Translation ==
Directions in music – sound sculptures by Bill Laswell with contributions from Terre Thaemlitz, The Orb, Tetsu Inoue. Created and mastered at Greenpoint Studio, Brooklyn, New York. Produced by Bill Laswell.

=== CD1 ===
1. "Eternal Drift" (Bill Laswell, Nicky Skopelitis, Terre Thaemlitz) – 15:53 – originally on Hallucination Engine
2. "Peace" (Pharoah Sanders, Eddie Hazel, Sonny Sharrock) – 17:11
3. "Aum" (L. Shankar, Ganam Rao, Jah Wobble, Skopelitis) – 17:37
4. "Cosmic Trigger" (George Clinton, Bernie Worrell, Laswell, Bootsy Collins, Buckethead) – 16:19

=== CD2 ===
1. "Dharmapala" (MA Wahab, Jonas Hellborg) – 14:35
2. "Flash of Panic" (HA. Attar, Ginger Baker, Skopelitis, Laswell) – 15:17
3. "Holy Mountain" (Liu Sola, Laswell) – 16:41
4. "Ruins" (Laswell, Tetsu Inoue) – 8:00 – originally on Hallucination Engine

=== Side 1 ===
1. "Eternal Drift" – 9:00
2. "Aum" – 17:37

=== Side 2 ===
1. "Dharmapala" – 8:44
2. "Holy Mountain" – 8:16

=== Side 3 ===
1. "Eternal Drift" [Construct Over Destiny Mix] – 12:02

=== Side 4 ===
1. "Holy Mountain" [L.F.O. What Do You Think? Mix] – 9:05

== Axiom Funk: Funkcronomicon ==
A 12" single containing four mixes of "If 6 was 9" was released in 1996 (Axiom/Island, PR12 7212-1) as Axion Funk, featuring Bootsy Collins.

=== CD1 ===
1. "Order within the Universe" (Bernie Worrell, Bill Laswell, Grand Mixer DXT) – 3:17
2. "Under the Influence (Jes Grew)" (George Clinton, Laswell, Bootsy Collins, Sly Dunbar, Robbie Shakespeare) – 5.45
3. "If 6 was 9" (Jimi Hendrix) – 6:00
4. "Orbitron Attack" (Grace Cook) – 12:29
5. "Cosmic Slop" (Clinton, Worrell) – 5:15 – taken from Material's The Third Power
6. "Free-Bass (Godzillatron Cush)" (Laswell, Collins, Weeden) – 5:43
7. "Tell the World" (Collins, Maceo Parker, Sly Stewart) – 3:53 – taken from Maceo Parker's For All the King's Men
8. "Pray my Soul" (Cook) – 5:08

=== CD2 ===
1. "Hideous Mutant Freekz" (Clinton, Collins, Worrell, Laswell) – 7:25
2. "Sax Machine" (Collins, Parker, Bobby Byrd) – 7:47 – taken from Maceo Parker's For all the King's Men
3. "Animal Behavior" (Laswell, Collins, Buckethead) – 7:09 – taken from Praxis Transmutation (Mutatis Mutandis)
4. "Trumpets and Violins, Violins" (Hendrix) – 3:38
5. "Telling Time" (Nicky Skopelitis) – 4:57 – taken from Nicky Skopelitis's Ekstasis
6. "Jungle Free-Bass" (Laswell, Collins) – 5:38
7. "Blackout" (Blackbyrd McKnight) – 3:44
8. "Sacred to the Pain" (Cook, Umar Bin Hassan) – 4:54

== Axiom Dub: Mysteries of Creation ==
Compiled, edited and mastered at Greenpoint Studio, Brooklyn, New York. Conceived and constructed by Bill Laswell.

=== CD1 ===
1. Ninj / Bill Laswell – "Maroon Rebellion" (Bill Laswell, Ninj) – 5:55
  - Ninj – beats
  - Bill Laswell – bass
2. Sly and Robbie – "Return to the Bass and Trouble" (Sly Dunbar, Robbie Shakespeare) – 7:00
  - Sly Dunbar – drums
  - Robbie Shakespeare – bass
  - Bill Laswell – sound FX
3. Sub Dub – "Revolution" (John Ward, Raz Mesinai) – 6:59
  - John Ward – bass
  - Raz Mesinai a.k.a. the Bedouin – percussion
  - Tony Buzzeo – guitar
4. The Orb – "Cocksville U.S.A." (N.Burton, Andy Hughes, Kris Needs, Alex Patterson, Simon Phillips) – 10:32
5. We featuring DJ Olive, Loop, Once 11 – "Illbient" (Gregor Asch, Rich Panciera, Ignacio Platas) – 8:08
6. Material – "Ghost Light / Dread Recall" (Laswell) – 14:17
7. Wordsound I-Powa – "Dungeon of Dub" (Skiz Fernando) – 5:33

=== CD2 ===
1. Mad Professor – "Ariwa Dub Club" (Neil Fraser) – 5:06
2. Automaton – "Beta One / Assyrian Dub" (Bill Laswell, Gabe Katz, Jah Wobble) – 11:12
  - Jah Wobble, Gabe Katz – bass
  - Nicky Skopelitis: guitar
3. Dub Syndicate – "Gun Too Hot" (Style Scott, Adrian Maxwell, Bernard Alexander) – 4:41
  - produced by Style Scott and Adrian Sherwood
  - Akuba & I Roy – backing vocals
  - Errol "Flabba" Holt – bass
  - Skip McDonald – guitar
  - Franklyn "Bubbler" Waul – keyboards
  - Dean Fraser – sax
  - Keith Sterling – piano, synthesizer
  - Carlton "Bubblers" Ogilvie – piano, organ, synth
  - Style Scott – drums, percussion
  - Scully – percussion
4. Jah Wobble with Jaki Liebezeit and Neville Murray – "Nev 12" (Jah Wobble, Neville Murray) – 6:08
  - Jah Wobble – bass
  - Jaki Liebezeit – drums
  - Neville Murray – percussion
5. Techno Animal – "Cyborg Dread" (D.Bennet, Justin Broadrick, Kevin Martin) – 5:39
  - Dr. Israel – voice
6. New Kingdom – "Black Falcon Dub" (Jason Furlow, Sebastian Laws, Scott Harding) – 6:06
7. Scarab – "Fall of the Towers of Convention" (Fernando, Sassan Ghari) – 7:39
  - Skiz Fernando & Sassan Ghari – sounds
8. DJ Spooky – "Anansi Abstrakt" (Paul Miller) – 11:37

== Axiom: Reconstructions and Vexations ==
Remixes of tracks from Jah Wobble and Bill Laswell's Radioaxiom: A Dub Transmission, and Tabla Beat Science's Tala Matrix.

1. Carl Craig – "Alsema Dub mix" (Bill Laswell, Jah Wobble, Ejigayehu Shibabaw) – 6:28
2. 4 Hero – "Orion" [Dollis Dub mix] (Laswell, Wobble) – 5:48
3. Bedouin Ascent – "Secret Channel" [Asian Resistance mix] (Zakir Hussain, Laswell, K. Biswas) – 9:07
4. Dr. Israel – "Alam Dub mix" (Laswell, Wobble, Shibabaw) – 8:37
5. Karsh Kale – "Taarut" [X-Hail the Lehra mix] (Hussain, Ustad Sultan Khan) – 5:18
6. Carl Craig – "Alsema Dub" [Astral Africa mix] (Laswell, Wobble, Shibabaw) – 10:47
7. Midival Punditz – "Palmistry" [Pundit Stylee mix] (Karsh Kale) – 4:26
8. Bill Laswell – "Shiva Myth" (Laswell) – 6:00

== Release history ==
- Axiom Collection: Illuminations – 1991 – Axiom / Island, 422-848 958-2 (CD)
- Axiom Collection II: Manifestation – 1993 – Axiom / Island, 314-514-453-2 (CD)
- Axiom Ambient: Lost in the Translation – 1994 – Axiom / Island, 314-524-053-2 (2CD)
- Axiom Ambient: Lost in the Translation – 1994 – Axiom / Island, 314-524-053-1 (2LP, 2000 copies)
- Axion Funk: Funkcronomicon – 1995 – Axiom / Island, 314-524-077-2 (2CD)
- Axiom Dub: Mysteries of Creation – 1996 – Axiom / Island, 524 313-2 (2CD)
- Axiom: Reconstructions & Vexations – 2003 – Axiom / Palm Pictures, PALMCD 2093-2 (CD)
