= Change the Beat =

1982 single by Fab Five Freddy

"Change the Beat (French and English Rap)"

Single by Beside/Fab 5 Freddy
- B-side: "Change the Beat (French Rap)" (Note: Also referred to as "Change the Beat (Female Version)".)
- Released: 1982
- Studio: OAO Studio, Brooklyn, New York City
- Length: 7:37
- Label: Celluloid Records
- Songwriters: Bernard Zekri; Material; Fab 5
- Producer: Material

"Change the Beat (French and English Rap)", also referred to as "Change the Beat (Male Version)", is a song written and recorded by Fab 5 Freddy and produced by Bill Laswell’s group Material. The remix by female vocalist Beside (Ann Boyle) of the band Time Zone is one of the most sampled songs in music history.

== Side A ==
It was recorded at Martin Bisi's OAO Studio in Brooklyn, New York, United States, (later, BC Studio) and released as a 12" single on the Celluloid label in 1982. This release and all subsequent pressings of the single feature two versions of the song, one on Side A and one on Side B. The official length of the tracks varies depending on the specific pressing of the single, with some releases mislabeling the running times entirely. The Side A version is 7:37 minutes in length and features Fab Five Freddy rapping in both English and French. He also performs the chorus of the song, utilizing a vocoder with a white noise carrier to achieve a gritty, robotic effect.

== Side B and sampling ==
The version of the song that appears on Side B is considerably shorter than the A-side track, clocking in at 3:42. Aside from the chorus, which, like the Side A, was performed by Fab Five Freddy through the vocoder, the lead vocals are performed by rapper Beside and rapped entirely in French, making this single one of the first multilingual hip-hop releases.

At the end of the Side B version, there appears the phrase "Ahhhhh, this stuff is really fresh", spoken through a vocoder. The first and last words are two of the most widely used samples for scratching. In 2014, BBC declared it the most sampled song in music history. The earliest sample was the 1983 Herbie Hancock single "Rockit", which featured scratching by pioneering DJ and turntablist Grandmixer DXT (then known as GrandMixer D.ST).

Although most people familiar with the record believe the sample comes from the processed voice of Fab Five Freddy, that account is disputed by producer Bill Laswell, one of the musicians credited on the record. Laswell states that it was his manager Roger Trilling who recorded the sample during earlier sessions for another project. According to both Laswell and Trilling himself, Trilling was imitating a record executive who would reportedly exclaim "this stuff is really fresh!" whenever he heard a song he liked. The sample, then, is an imitation of this executive by Roger Trilling and spoken through a vocoder.

== Track listing ==
All tracks produced by Material.

A-side
No.	Title	Writer(s)	Artist	Length
1.	"Change the Beat" (French and English Rap)	Bernard Zekri; Material; Fab 5	Fab 5 Freddy	7:37 (Note: Incorrect listed on the label as 6:57.)

B-side
No.	Title	Writer(s)	Artist	Length
1.	"Change the Beat" (French Rap)	Bernard Zekri; Material	Beside	3:45 (Note: Incorrect listed on the label as 8:34.)
