= About Time (New York Gong album) =

Studio album by Daevid Allen and New York Gong
- Released: 1980
- Recorded: 1979
- Studios: Bananamoon Observatory Studio, Willow, New York
- Genres: Psychedelia; post-punk
- Label: Charley CRL 5021
- Producer: Daevid Allen

Gong chronology
Live Floating Anarchy 1977 (1978)	About Time (1980)	Shapeshifter (1992)

Material chronology
About Time (1980)	Temporary Music (1981)

Professional ratings
Review scores
Source	Rating
Allmusic	3.5/5 stars

About Time is a 1980 album by Daevid Allen and Gong offshoot New York Gong. The basic line-up of New York Gong would continue without Allen as Material.

"Much too Old" / "I Am a Freud" was issued as a 7" single in 1979 (Charly, CYS 1056), and "Jungle Windo(w)" / "Much too Old" / "Materialism" as a 10" EP in 1980.

Allen also released the 1982 album Divided Alien Playbax 80 which featured tracks recorded during these sessions. A further album, Daevid Allen and the Divided Alien Clockwork Band was released in 1997 (Blueprint, BP 269) of a live performance from the Squat Theatre, New York, August 1980, which featured tape loops from the Divided Alien Playbax 80 album. The Daevid Allen 1983 Alien in New York EP (Charly Records, CYZ 10) featured two tracks which were also based on tape loops from these sessions.

== Track listing ==
=== Side 1 ===
1. "Preface" (Daevid Allen, Michael Beinhorn) – 1:28
2. "Much Too Old" (Allen, Bill Laswell) – 2:43
3. "Black September" (Allen, Cliff Cultreri) – 4:03
4. "Materialism" (Laswell, Cultreri) – 3:12
5. "Strong Woman" (Allen, Bill Bacon) – 4:30
6. "I Am a Freud" (Allen) – 1:46

=== Side 2 ===
7. "O My Photograph" (Allen) – 9:10
8. "Jungle Windo(w)" (Allen) – 6:19
9. "Hours Gone" (Allen) – 4:05

== Personnel ==
- Daevid Allen – vocals, guitar, glissando guitar
- Cliff Cultreri – guitar (2,3,4,8,9)
- Bill Laswell – bass
- Fred Maher – drums (except 5 & 6)
- Bill Bacon – drums (except 7)

Additional personnel

- Michael Beinhorn – synthesizer (1)
- Don Davis – alto saxophone (6)
- Gary Windo – tenor saxophone (8)
- Mark Kramer – organ (9)
