= Rehearsal (disambiguation) =

A rehearsal is a preparatory event in music and theatre (and in other contexts) that is performed before the official public performance.

Rehearsal may also refer to:

- Rehearsal (album), 2021 album by Skegss
- Rehearsal (educational psychology), the cognitive process of repeating information over and over to aid learning
- Rehearsal (EP), a 2005 EP by A Perfect Murder
- Rehearsal (film), a 2015 film directed by Carl Bessai
- "Rehearsal" (Space Ghost Coast to Coast), a television episode
- "Rehearsal" (Succession), a television episode

== See also ==
- Memory rehearsal, a term for the role of repetition in the retention of memories
- The Rehearsal (disambiguation)
- Dress Rehearsal (disambiguation)
