= Live from Soundscape =

Live from Soundscape may refer to:

- Live from Soundscape (Material album)
- Live from Soundscape (Sun Ra album)
