= Temporary Music =

Studio album by Material
- Released: 1981
- Recorded: July 1979, March and September 1980
- Genre: No wave, post-disco, post-punk
- Label: Celluloid, CEL 6576
- Producer: Material, Martin Bisi

Material chronology
About Time (1979)	Temporary Music (1981)	American Songs (1981)

Professional ratings
Review scores
Source	Rating
Spin Alternative Record Guide	7/10

Temporary Music is the 1979 debut EP and 1981 debut album by the New York based no wave music group Material.

The band had previously worked with Daevid Allen on New York Gong's 1979 About Time album. The Temporary Music 1 EP was recorded in 1979 and the Temporary Music 2 EP in 1980. The two EPs were compiled together for Material's debut album, two slightly different versions being released, one on Red Rec. which also included the "Discourse" single, and one on Celluloid which simply put each EP on either side of the album. Some CD versions include the "Detached"/"Ciquiri" single, recorded with Robert Quine.

== Track listing ==
=== Temporary Music 1 EP ===
1. "O.A.O" (Bill Laswell, Fred Maher, Michael Beinhorn, Cliff Cultreri) – 4:43
2. "On Sadism" (Laswell, Maher, Beinhorn, Cultreri) – 5:04
3. "White Man" (Laswell, Maher, Beinhorn, Cultreri) – 7:40
4. "Process / Motion" (Laswell, Maher, Beinhorn, Cultreri) – 4:34

=== Temporary Music 2 EP ===
1. "Reduction" (Laswell, Maher, Beinhorn) – 5:30
2. "Heritage" (Laswell, Maher, Beinhorn) – 3:33
3. "Secret Life" (Laswell, Maher, Beinhorn) – 5:45
4. "Dark Things" (Laswell, Maher, Beinhorn) – 5:10

=== Temporary Music Red Rec LP ===
1. "Reduction" (Laswell, Maher, Beinhorn) – 5:30
2. "Heritage" (Laswell, Maher, Beinhorn) – 3:33
3. "Discourse" (Laswell, Beinhorn, Cultreri, Bill Bacon) – 4:05
4. "Slow Murder" (Laswell, Beinhorn, Cultreri, Bacon) – 3:59
5. "O.A.O"(Laswell, Maher, Beinhorn, Cultreri) – 4:43
6. "White Man" (Laswell, Maher, Beinhorn, Cultreri) – 7:40
7. "Secret Life" (Laswell, Maher, Beinhorn) – 5:45

=== Temporary Music CD version (Celluloid, Restless) ===
1. "O.A.O" (Bill Laswell, Fred Maher, Michael Beinhorn, Cliff Cultreri) – 4:43
2. "On Sadism" (Laswell, Maher, Beinhorn, Cultreri) – 5:04
3. "White Man" (Laswell, Maher, Beinhorn, Cultreri) – 7:40
4. "Process / Motion" (Laswell, Maher, Beinhorn, Cultreri) – 4:34
5. "Discourse" (Bacon, Laswell, Cultreri, Beinhorn) - 4:05
6. "Slow Murder" (Bacon, Laswell, Cultreri, Beinhorn) - 3:59
7. "Reduction" (Laswell, Maher, Beinhorn) – 5:30
8. "Heritage" (Laswell, Maher, Beinhorn) – 3:33
9. "Secret Life" (Laswell, Maher, Beinhorn) – 5:45
10. "Dark Things" (Laswell, Maher, Beinhorn) – 5:10
11. "Detached" (Laswell, Maher, Beinhorn, Quine) - 5:02
12. "Ciquiri" (Laswell, Maher, Beinhorn, Quine) - 6:22

Note: Some CD versions omit the "Detached"/"Ciquiri" single; others have a different track order. The compilation has also been released on CD as Secret Life.

== Personnel ==
- Bill Laswell – 4 and 6 string basses
- Michael Beinhorn – synthesizers, pianos, clarinet, percussion, tapes
- Fred Maher – guitar, drums, rhythm box, percussion (except "Discourse" single)
- Cliff Cultreri – guitar (Temporary Music 1 EP and "Discourse" single)
- Bill Bacon – drums ("Discourse" single)

Additional personnel

- Don Davis – sax ("White Man")

== Production ==
- Temporary Music 1 EP recorded on 23–25 July 1979 at Eddy Offord's Studio, Woodstock, New York. Engineered by Eddy Offord and Rob Davis. Produced by Giorgio Gomelsky.
- "Discourse"/"Slow Murder" single recorded in March, 1980. Produced by Material with Martin Bisi.
- Temporary Music 2 EP recorded 25–26 September 1980 at Linden Studios, Ambler, PA. Engineered by Bill Mauchly & Vin Moos. Produced by Material and Martin Bisi.
- "Detached"/"Ciquiri" single recorded in 1981. Produced by Material.

== Release history ==
- Temporary Music 1 EP – 1979 – Zu Records, ZU-EP-100 (12")
- Temporary Music 1 EP – 1979 – Red Rec., RS 12.006 (12")
- "Discourse"/"Slow Murder" single – 1980 – Red Rec., 45001 (7")
- "Discourse"/"Slow Murder" single – 198? – Celluloid, CEL 6219 (7")
- Temporary Music 2 EP – 1981 – Red Rec., RS 12.008 (12")
- Temporary Music LP – 1981 – Red Rec., RS 12.000
- Temporary Music LP – 1981 – Celluloid, CEL 6576 (LP)
- "Ciquiri (Discomix)" single (note: though called "Discomix" here, this is the only version of the song) - 1981, Red Rec., RS 12.012
- American Songs EP (compilation of "Discourse" and "Ciquiri" singles) - 1981, Celluloid, CEL 6596
