= Memory Serves =

Studio album by Material
- Released: 1981
- Recorded: OAO Studio, Brooklyn, New York
- Length: 38:51
- Label: Celluloid, 529812; Elektra/Musician
- Producer: Material with Martin Bisi

Material chronology
American Songs (1981)	Memory Serves (1981)	Bustin' Out (1981)

Professional ratings
Review scores
Source	Rating
Allmusic	4.5/5 stars
The Rolling Stone Jazz Record Guide	3/5 stars
Select	4/5 stars
Spin Alternative Record Guide	8/10

Memory Serves is a 1981 album by the New York based No Wave music group Material.

== Track listing ==
1. "Memory Serves" (Bill Laswell, Michael Beinhorn) – 5:08
2. "Disappearing" (Olu Dara, Sonny Sharrock, Laswell, Beinhorn, Fred Maher) – 7:11
3. "Upriver" (Billy Bang, Laswell, Beinhorn, Maher) – 5:25
4. "Metal Test" (Fred Frith, Laswell, Beinhorn, Maher) – 4:30
5. "Conform To The Rhythm" (Laswell, Beinhorn, Frith) – 4:30
6. "Unauthorized" (Sharrock, Laswell, Maher) – 3:50
7. "Square Dance" (Frith, Laswell, Maher) – 4:29
8. "Silent Land" (George Lewis, Laswell, Beinhorn) – 3:48
9. "For A Few Dollars More" (E. Morricone) – 3:51 (7" edit, bonus track on CD release)

== Personnel ==
Material

- Bill Laswell – 4, 6 and 8 string basses
- Michael Beinhorn – synthesizers, tapes, radio, guitar, drums, voice.
- Fred Maher – drums, percussion, guitar (except "Silent Land")

Additional personnel

- Sonny Sharrock – guitar (except "Square Dance" and "Silent Land")
- Fred Frith – guitar, violin, xylophone (1,4,5,7)
- Olu Dara – cornet ("Disappearing", "Upriver")
- Henry Threadgill – alto sax ("Disappearing", "Unauthorized", "Square Dance")
- George Lewis – trombone ("Memory Serves", "Square Dance", "Silent Land")
- Billy Bang – violin ("Upriver", "Unauthorized")
- Charles K. Noyes – drums, percussion, bells ("Memory Serves", "Silent Land")

== Production ==
- Recorded at OAO Studio, Brooklyn, New York. Produced by Material with Martin Bisi.

== Reception ==
Writing in The Boston Phoenix, Howard Litwak said that on Memory Serves, "Material intersperses its potent riffs and explosive electric power with interludes of noise, musique concrete, and unaccompanied synthesizer blats. Overlaid on this foot-stomping sound — the rhythm section of bassist Bill Laswell and drummers Michael Beinhorn and Fred Maher wants to kick your speakers out — is a collection of first-rate jazzmen (Henry Threadgill, Olu Dara, George Lewis, Billy Bang, and Sharrock) who are willing to interpret Material’s music on its own terms."
