= The Rehearsal =

The Rehearsal may refer to:

- The Rehearsal (play), 1672, by George Villiers
- The Rehearsal (1974 film), about the Greek junta
- The Rehearsal (novel), 2008, by Eleanor Catton
  - The Rehearsal (2016 film), a New Zealand drama based on the novel
- The Rehearsal (TV series), a docu-comedy by Nathan Fielder
- The Rehearsal, a 1992 album by Christie Hennessy
- "The Rehearsal", an episode of the 2014 web series Mozart in the Jungle

== See also ==
- Rehearsal (disambiguation)
- Dress Rehearsal (disambiguation)
