= Cease to Suffer =

Studio album by A Perfect Murder
- Released: May 20, 2003
- Recorded: @ Le Labs, 2002
- Genres: Metalcore, groove metal
- Length: 26:39
- Label: Cyclop
- Producer: Louis Dionne

A Perfect Murder chronology
Blood Covered Words (2001)	Cease to Suffer (2003)	Unbroken (2004)

Cease to Suffer is the debut full-length album released by the heavy metal band A Perfect Murder.

== Track listing ==
1. "I've Lost" – 2:20
2. "Pushed Too Far" – 1:36
3. "Cease to Suffer" – 2:47
4. "The Burning Cross" – 1:23
5. "Last Kiss" – 2:08
6. "Laughed at My Pain" – 2:29
7. "Choke" – 1:54
8. "Disappear" – 2:13
9. "Lose It All" – 2:31
10. "Dead and Gone" – 3:08
11. "Interlude" – 1:34
12. "Prophet on a Lie" – 2:36
