= Blood Covered Words =

EP by A Perfect Murder
- Released: 2001
- Genres: Metalcore; Hardcore punk

A Perfect Murder chronology
Blood Covered Words (2001)	Cease to Suffer (2003)

Blood Covered Words is an EP by the Canadian heavy metal band A Perfect Murder.

== Track listing ==
1. "Intro"
2. "Crucified by Fear"
3. "Downfall of the Human Empire"
4. "God's Worthless Promises"
5. "There Is No Escape"
6. "Dig Your Grave"
7. "A Perfect Murder"
