= Everything Last Winter =

Studio album by Fields
- Released: April 2, 2007
- Genre: Indie Rock; Art rock; Shoegazing; post-Britpop
- Length: 49:10
- Label: Atlantic
- Producer: Michael Beinhorn

Professional ratings
Review scores
Source	Rating
Allmusic	4/5 stars
Drowned in Sound	6/10 stars
Pitchfork Media	(5.9/10)

Everything Last Winter is the debut album from the Anglo-Icelandic band Fields, first released April 2, 2007 by Atlantic Records. The album was produced by Michael Beinhorn. Tracks released as singles are "If You Fail We All Fail" and "Charming The Flames". The album is dedicated to Alan Spenner and features many thanks including to the bands Snow Patrol, Editors, and Bloc Party. The track "Song For The Fields" was featured as a Single of the Week on iTunes.

== Track listing ==
No.	Title	Length
1.	"Song For The Fields"	5:47
2.	"Charming The Flames"	4:35
3.	"You Don't Need This Song (To Fix Your Broken Heart)"	4:10
4.	"Schoolbooks"	5:01
5.	"The Death"	4:55
6.	"You Brought This On Yourself"	5:31
7.	"Skulls And Flesh And More"	4:51
8.	"Feathers"	5:41
9.	"If You Fail We All Fail"	5:45
10.	"Parasite"	2:56
Total length:		49:10

== Credits ==
=== Fields ===
- Nick Peill: acoustic guitar, vocals, keyboards
- Thorunn Antonia: keyboards, vocals, synths
- Henry Spenner: drums, vocals
- Matty Derham: bass
- Jamie Putnam: electric guitar

=== Additional Personnel ===
- Michael Beinhorn: producer
- Eliot James: vocal production, additional production, mixing
