= 4 from the Village =

4 From the Village

EP by Fields
- Released: July 10, 2006
- Genres: Electronic, indie
- Length: 16:13
- Label: Black Lab Recordings

Professional ratings
Review scores
Source	Rating
Pitchfork	6.9/10

4 From the Village is an EP by the Anglo-Icelandic band Fields. The EP was released via Black Lab Recordings on July 10, 2006.

== Track listing ==
No.	Title	Length
1.	"Brittlesticks"	3:35
2.	"Heretic"	4:24
3.	"Isabel"	5:00
4.	"Roll Down the Hill"	3:14

== Personnel ==
- Nick Peill – vocals, acoustic guitar, keyboards
- Thorunn Antonia – vocals, keyboards, synths
- Henry Spenner – vocals, drums
- Matty Derham – bass guitar
- Jamie Putnam – electric guitar
- Dan Gretch-Marguerat – producer, mixer
- Jim Abbiss – producer, mixer for "Brittlesticks"
