= Fields (band) =

English band

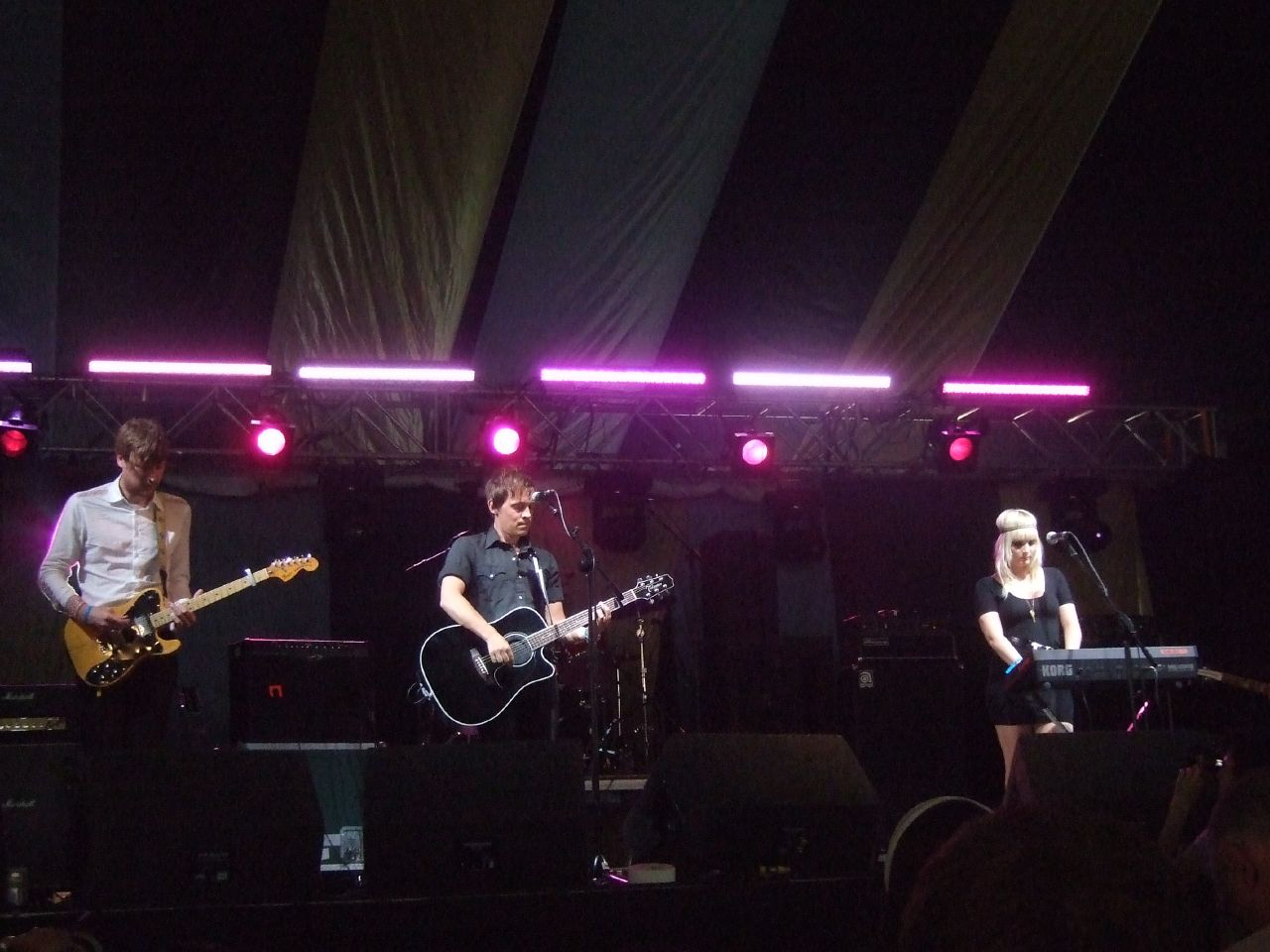
- Fields at Latitude Festival 2007

Background information
- Origin: England
- Genres: Electronic; Indie
- Years active: 2006–2009
- Labels: Atlantic Records, Black Lab Records
- Past members: Nick Peill; Thórunn Antonía Magnúsdóttir; Henry Spenner; Matty Derham; Jamie Putnam

Fields were an Anglo-Icelandic electronic/indie band formed in London in 2006. After playing their first live shows they signed a deal with Atlantic Records, which allowed them to release through their own Black Lab Records their 2007 debut album Everything Last Winter, recorded with producer Michael Beinhorn at Sun Studios in Dublin.

Vocalist Nick Peill instigated most of Fields' songs. Alongside Peill, the line-up was vocalist and keyboard player Thórunn Antonía, lead guitarist Jamie Putnam, drummer Henry Spenner (son of Alan Spenner), and bassist Matthew "Matty" Derham, who later joined Does It Offend You, Yeah? as a drummer.

Fields played on tour with Wolfmother and Bloc Party, and on their own tour in 2007. There were tour dates for late 2008 as well that span through November 2008.

Although recording work commenced on a follow-up album to be entitled Lost Frequencies, which was intended to include the songs "Sun In Your Eyes", "Constantly", "Are You Ready Yet?", "Worst Love" and "Call The Captain", the full album remains unreleased. Existing records are present on Discogs and several other websites of a promotional album sampler CD that was released prior to the dissolution of the band. Lost Frequencies was set for an early 2009 release.

The band split up in 2009 after they lost their recording contract.

== Former members ==
- Nick Peill – vocals, acoustic guitar, keyboards
- Thórunn Antonía Magnúsdóttir – keyboards, vocals, synths
- Henry Spenner – drums, vocals
- Matty Derham – bass guitar
- Jamie Putnam – electric guitar

== Discography ==
Singles/EPs

- "Song For The Fields", single (2006), Black Lab Records
- 8 From The Village EP (2006), Warner Music
- 4 From The Village EP (2006), Black Lab Records
- 7 From The Village EP (2006), Atlantic Records
- "Heretic", single (2006), Black Lab Records
- "If You Fail We All Fail", single (20/11/2006)
- Feathers EP (2007), Atlantic Records
- "Charming The Flames", single (26/03/2007), Atlantic Records
- The Fields EP, No Label (2005)

Albums

- Everything Last Winter (02/04/2007), Atlantic Records/Black Lab Records

== Videos ==
- Song For The Fields (2006)
- Brittlesticks (2006)
- If You Fail We All Fail (2006)
- Charming The Flames (2007)
