= Outer Dark (album) =

Studio album by Bill Laswell
- Released: December 4, 1994
- Studio: Greenpoint (Brooklyn)
- Genre: Dark ambient
- Length: 47:44
- Label: FAX +49-69/450464
- Producer: Bill Laswell

Bill Laswell chronology
Lost in the Translation (1994)	Outer Dark (1994)	Web (1995)

Professional ratings
Review scores
Source	Rating
Allmusic	2.5/5 stars

Outer Dark is the third solo album by American composer Bill Laswell, released on December 4, 1994, by FAX +49-69/450464.

== Track listing ==
All music is composed by Bill Laswell.

No.	Title	Length
1.	"Chakra"	24:14
2.	"Ananta (Passing Dream)"	23:31

== Personnel ==
Adapted from the Outer Dark liner notes.

Musicians

- Bill Laswell – effects, producer

Technical personnel

- Layng Martine – assistant engineer
- Robert Musso – engineering, effects
- Thi-Linh Le – photography

== Release history ==
Region	Date	Label	Format	Catalog
Germany	1994	FAX +49-69/450464	CD	PS 08/66
