= Secret Lives =

Secret Lives may refer to:

- Secret Lives (novel), a 1932 novel by E. F. Benson
- Secret Lives (film), a 1937 film from Ealing Studios
- Secret Lives: Hidden Children and Their Rescuers During WWII, a 2002 documentary directed by Aviva Slesin
- Secret Lives, 1995-1997 documentary series by Channel 4
- Secret Lives, 2005 Australian TV film Duncan Regehr and Ky Furneaux
- Secret Lives, 1999 Australian TV series Greg Stevens (writer)
- "Secret Lives", song by Electric Light Orchestra from Balance of Power (album)
- Filmworks XI: Secret Lives

== See also ==
- Secret Life (disambiguation)
