= Dress Rehearsal (disambiguation) =

A dress rehearsal is a final rehearsal of an artistic work just prior to its first public performance.

Dress Rehearsal may also refer to:

- Dress Rehearsal (album), by Carolyn Dawn Johnson, 2004
- "The Dress Rehearsal", an episode of TV series Smash
- Dress Rehearsal, a 1956 TV film by Eric Sykes
- Dress Rehearsal, a series of Canadian TV specials, a preview of the series Drop-In

== See also ==
- Rehearsal (disambiguation)
- The Rehearsal (disambiguation)
