= Rehearsal (EP) =

EP by A Perfect Murder
- Released: January 18, 2005
- Recorded: Le Labs, 2004–2005
- Genre: Heavy metal, hardcore punk
- Length: 26:58
- Label: Cyclop Media
- Producer: Louis Dionne

A Perfect Murder chronology
Unbroken (2004)	Rehearsal (2005)	Strength Through Vengeance (2005)

Rehearsal is an EP by Canadian metal band A Perfect Murder, released on January 18, 2005. It was produced by Louis Dionne and features six tracks.

Aversionline wrote that it was "so much worse than everything else they've done" to that point.

== Track listing ==
No.	Title	Length
1.	"Trapped"	2:51
2.	"One Last Time"	2:59
3.	"Metal Up Your Ass"	9:58
4.	"Season in the Abyss"	6:17
5.	"Black Sabbath"	2:22
6.	"A Perfect Murder"	2:32
