= Unbroken (A Perfect Murder album) =

Studio album by A Perfect Murder
- Released: July 13, 2004
- Recorded: @ Trax East Studios, 2004
- Genre: Metalcore
- Length: 34:43
- Label: Victory Records
- Producer: Eric Rachel

A Perfect Murder chronology
Cease to Suffer (2003)	Unbroken (2004)	Rehearsal (2005)

Unbroken is the second full-length album from Canadian heavy metal band A Perfect Murder. It was released by Victory Records on 13 July 2004 and contains a total of fourteen tracks. The music was produced by Eric Rachel.

== Track listing ==
Professional ratings
Review scores
Source	Rating
laut.de	3/5 stars

1. "Jaded" – 2:09
2. "Possessed" – 2:56
3. "Time Bomb" – 2:53
4. "Speak Without Faith" – 1:57
5. "Slave To The Clock" – 2:22
6. "Unbroken" – 3:09
7. "No Truce" – 2:00
8. "Eye For An Eye" – 2:36
9. "Savior" – 2:06
10. "Bouc Emissaire" – 1:56
11. "Die With Regret" – 2:58
12. "No Pulse In My Veins" – 4:01
13. "Another Day, Another Plague" – 3:40
14. "Untitled" (Bonus Track) - 1:36
