= My Secret Life =

My Secret Life may refer to:

- My Secret Life (memoir), by "Walter", the memoir of a Victorian gentleman's sexual development and experiences
- My Secret Life (Sonia Dada album), 1998
- My Secret Life (Eric Burdon album), 2004
- My Secret Life (Billy Ruffian album), 2007
- My Secret Life (Julee Cruise album), 2011
