= Intonarumori (album) =

Studio album by Material
- Released: 1999
- Genre: Hip hop, trip hop, alternative
- Label: Axiom / Palm Pictures, PALMCD 2019-2
- Producer: Bill Laswell, Scotty Hard, Eddie Def, DXT, Hideo Tanaka, Mr. Len (Company Flow), Extrakd, Dark Matter, Abu El Mustaf

Material chronology
Hallucination Engine (1994)	Intonarumori (1999)

Professional ratings
Review scores
Source	Rating
AllMusic	4/5 stars

Intonarumori is an album by the New York–based music group Material, released in 1999.

== Critical reception ==
The Cleveland Scene wrote: "While Intonarumori boasts a dizzying variety of artists, its themes—Pan-Africanism, the need to review history through Afrocentric eyes, the stifling aspects of official white culture—are perhaps richer than those of Imaginary Cuba [Laswell's concurrent solo album]."

== Track listing ==
1. Rammellzee – "Intime" (Rammellzee, Bill Laswell) – 1:11
2. Kool Keith and Kut Masta Kurt – "Conspiracies" (Keith Thornton, Kurt Matlin, Laswell) – 4:22
3. Extrakd and Eddie Def – "Rodent Robots" (S. Freeman, E. Garcia) – 1:32
4. Flavor Flav, phonosycographDISK and DXT – "Burnin'" (William Drayton, Laswell, Derek Showard) – 4:36
5. Extrakd and Eddie Def – "Who Wakes the Rooster?" (Freeman, Garcia) – 1:19
6. Juggaknots feat. Breeze & Queen Heroine – "This Morning" (L. Smythe, P. Smith, K. Smith) – 3:57
7. Rammellzee and phonosycographDISK – "No Guts No Galaxy" (Rammellzee, Laswell) – 4:47
8. Killah Priest – "Temple of the Mental" (Walter Reed, Laswell) – 6:09
9. Lori Carson and Bernie Worrell – "All That Future" (Lori Carson, Laswell) – 5:38
10. Nature Boy Jim Kelly – "My Style Is I Ain't Got No Style" (Jason Furlow, Laswell) – 4.54
11. Extrakd and Eddie Def – "Snipers for Biters" (S. Freeman, E. Garcia) – 1:46
12. Scotty Hard, Elwood and Ted Parsons – "Checkpoint 0.1" (Scott Harding) – 3:54
13. Ahlill the Transcending Soldier and Alicia Blue – "Mind Drift" (Taylor, Laswell) – 6:06
14. The Ghetto Prophets and DXT – "Life Itself" (K. Hassan, Laswell) – 3:26
15. Alicia Blue – "Flow" (Alicia Smith, Laswell) 3:53
16. Ahlill the Transcending Soldier, phonosycographDISK and Jerome "Bigfoot" Brailey – "Freestyle Journal" (E. Taylor, Laswell) – 4:54
17. Rammellzee – "Hisstory" (Rammellzee, Laswell) – 3:52

== Production ==
- Recorded and mixed at Orange Music Sound Studios, West Orange, NJ and at Greenpoint Studios, Brooklyn, NY.
- Additional recording at Greene Street Recording, NYC, Ozone Studios, NYC and Gonervill Studios, Oakland, CA.
- Engineering: Robert Musso, Scott Harding, Vassos & Paul.
- Production: Bill Laswell, Scotty Hard, Eddie Def, DXT, Hideo Tanaka, Mr. Len (Company Flow), Extrakd, Dark Matter, Abu El Mustafa

== Release history ==
- 1999 – Axiom / Palm Pictures, PALMCD 2019-2 (CD)
