= Hallucination Engine =

Album by Material

Studio album by Material
- Released: 1994
- Studio: Greenpoint Studio, Brooklyn, Platinum Island, BC Studio/Gowanus, Brooklyn, Krypton Studio, NY, Media Arts, Madras, India
- Genre: Jazz, dub, Indian
- Label: Axiom/Island/PolyGram Records; 518 351
- Producer: Bill Laswell

Material chronology
Live in Japan (1993)	Hallucination Engine (1994)	Intonarumori (1998)

Professional ratings
Review scores
Source	Rating
Allmusic	3/5 stars
Spin Alternative Record Guide	6/10

Hallucination Engine is a 1994 album by the New York based music group Material. The album mixes jazz, dub, funk and Indian music.

"Mantra" was issued as a 12" and CD single in 1993 (Axiom / Island, AXMCD1) featuring a 17-minute "Praying Mantra Mix" by The Orb, the album's "Doors of Perception Mix", and a 5-minute edit.

A Tetsu Inoue mix of "Ruins" was included on the Axiom Ambient: Lost in the Translation album.

"Eternal Drift" was issued as a 12" single in 1994 (Axiom / Island, PR12 6901-1) featuring the album version with re-mixes "Tribal Remix" by Kupper and Hacker, "Construct Over Destiny Mix" by Bill Laswell and "Eternal Thaemlitz Curse Mix" by Terre Thaemlitz. The last two mixes were included on the Axiom Ambient: Lost in the Translation album.

William S. Burroughs reading of "Words of Advice for Young People" had appeared on his 1993 album Spare Ass Annie and other Tales (The Operator's Manual).

"Cucumber Slumber" is a cover of the Weather Report track from the 1974 album Mysterious Traveller.

== Track listing ==
1. "Black Light" (Bill Laswell, Wayne Shorter) – 7:33
2. "Mantra" [Doors of Perception Mix] (Laswell, L. Shankar, Caroline) – 8:44
3. "Ruins" [Submutation Dub] (Laswell) – 8:54
4. "Eternal Drift" (Laswell, Nicky Skopelitis) – 7:35
5. "Words of Advice" (Laswell, William S. Burroughs) – 3:58
6. "Cucumber Slumber" [Fluxus Mix] (Joe Zawinul, Alphonso Johnson) – 7:30
7. "The Hidden Garden" (Laswell, Simon Shaheen, Skopelitis) / "Naima" (John Coltrane) – 13:00
8. "Shadows of Paradise" (Laswell, L. Shankar, Skopelitis) – 9:45

== Personnel ==
Material

- Bill Laswell – basses, beats, loops, samples, etc.

Additional personnel

- Wayne Shorter – soprano and tenor saxophones
- William S. Burroughs – voice ("Words of Advice")
- Liu Sola – voice ("Eternal Drift")
- Simon Shaheen – violin and oud
- Nicky Skopelitis – acoustic and electric 6- and 12- string guitars, coral electric sitar, baglama and Fairlight CMI
- Bernie Worrell – electric piano, Hammond B-3 organ
- Bootsy Collins – space bass
- L. Shankar – electric violin
- Sly Dunbar – drum kit
- Jeff Bova – synthesizers
- Jihad Racy – ney
- Jonas Hellborg – acoustic bass guitar and fretless electric bass
- Zakir Hussain – tabla
- Trilok Gurtu – tabla
- Vikku Vinayakram – ghatam
- Fahim Dandan – voice ("The Hidden Garden")
- George Basil – qanoun
- Michael Baklouk – daff, tambourine
- Aïyb Dieng – chatan, congas, percussion
- [SA]-Hallucination

== Production ==
- Recorded at Greenpoint Studio, BC Studio/Gowanus, Platinum Island Studio and Krypton Studio (New York) and Media Arts (Madras, India)
- Produced and arranged by Bill Laswell.
- Engineers Robert Musso, Oz Fritz and Martin Bisi
- Mixed by Robert Musso at Greenpoint Studio
- Cover by James Koehnline

== Release history ==
- 1994 – Axiom/Island/PolyGram 518 351
- 1994 – Axiom/BMG, 74321-18190
