= Live in Japan (Material album) =

Live album by Material
- Released: 1993
- Recorded: Shinjuku Pit Inn, Kyoto & Imabari on August 2,5 & 7 1992
- Genre: No Wave
- Label: Jimco, Japan, JICK-89225
- Producer: Bill Laswell

Material chronology
The Third Power (1991)	Live in Japan (1993)	Hallucination Engine (1994)

Professional ratings
Review scores
Source	Rating
Allmusic	2/5 stars
Spin Alternative Record Guide	7/10

Live in Japan is a 1993 live album by the New York based No Wave music group Material.

== Track listing ==
1. "Invocation" (Bernie Worrell) – 5:21
2. "Leaving Earth" (Foday Musa Suso, Bill Laswell) – 6:39
3. "Desert Star" (Suso, Laswell) – 9:38
4. "Out of the Dreamtime" (Suso) – 5:29
5. "Obsessed" (Ginger Baker, Aiyb Dieng) – 10:45
6. "Into the Seventh House" (Suso, Laswell, Nicky Skopelitis) – 6:20
7. "Dousongonni Song" (Suso) – 4:46
8. "The Receiver" (Suso, Laswell, Skopelitis) – 8:06
9. "The Creator Has a Master Plan" (Pharoah Sanders, Leon Thomas) – 8:50
10. "The Image of the One" (Worrell) – 2:28

== Personnel ==
- Bill Laswell – bass

Additional personnel

- Foday Musa Suso – kora, dousongonni, guitar, percussion, vocal
- Bernie Worrell – piano, Hammond organ, clavinet, synthesizer
- Nicky Skopelitis – 6 and 12 string guitars
- Aïyb Dieng – chatan, congas, talking drum, percussion
- Ginger Baker – drums

== Production ==
- Recorded live at Shinjuku Pit Inn, Kyoto & Imabari on August 2,5 & 7 1992.
- Produced by Bill Laswell

== Release history ==
- 1993 – Jimco, Jp., JICK-89225 (CD)
- 1993 – Restless, 7-72739-2 (CD)
