= A Perfect Murder (band) =

Canadian heavy metal band

- Origin: Montreal, Quebec, Canada
- Genres: Groove metal, thrash metal, metalcore
- Years active: 2000–2007; 2011–present
- Label: Victory
- Members: Frank Pellerin; Carl Bouchard; Kevin Lemire; Luc Verville; Yan Chausse
- Past members: Francois Michel Labrie; Kyrill Ducharme; Pierre Remillard; Sebastien; Jonathan; Dave B Kevin Randel

A Perfect Murder is a Canadian heavy metal band that formed in Montreal in 2000.

== History ==
A Perfect Murder was formed in 2000 in Montreal, Quebec by Carl Bouchard. Their first EP, Blood Covered Words, was released the same year. In 2003, before the release of the band's first full-length album, Bouchard decided to switch from vocals to lead guitar. Vocalist Frank Pellerin took over for Bouchard on 2003's Cease to Suffer. Later that year, the band signed with Victory Records. Still under contract to Cyclop Records, the band released the EP Rehearsal to fulfill their contract obligation. Their first full-length album for Victory was 2004's Unbroken. After the release of Unbroken, Pellerin left the band and was replaced by Tennessee native singer Kevin Randel to release 2005's Strength Through Vengeance. Less than one month after releasing their fourth full-length album, 2007's War of Aggression, the band decided to call it quits. The decision came after their tour support was pulled by Victory Records. They came back with the original line-up in 2009 to play some shows.

== Discography ==
- Split with Burning Bridge – demo tape, 2001
- Blood Covered Words – EP (2001)
- 3-song promo – promo CD (2003)
- Cease to Suffer (2003)
- Unbroken (2004)
- Rehearsal – EP (2005)
- Strength Through Vengeance (2005)
- War of Aggression (2007)
- Demonize (2013)

== Band members ==
- Frank Pellerin – vocals
- Carl Bouchard – lead guitar
- Kevin Lemire – rhythm guitar
- Luc Verville – bass
- Yan Chaussé – drums
