= Strength Through Vengeance =

Studio album by A Perfect Murder
- Released: July 26, 2005
- Recorded: Wild Studios, March–April 2005
- Genre: Groove metal, thrash metal
- Length: 42:57
- Label: Victory
- Producer: A Perfect Murder with Pierre Remillard & Pierre-Hughes Rondeau

A Perfect Murder chronology
| Rehearsal (2005) | Strength Through Vengeance (2005) | War of Aggression (2007) |

Professional ratings
Review scores
| Source | Rating |
|---|---|
| laut.de | link (German) |

Strength Through Vengeance is third full-length album by Canadian heavy metal band, A Perfect Murder. It is their first album featuring lead singer Kevin Randel.

== Track listing ==
1. "Strength Through Vengeance" – 5:29
2. "Black Hate Machine" – 4:49
3. "Wake Up And Die" – 3:01
4. "Snake Eyes" – 4:15
5. "Path Of Resistance" – 2:24
6. "Deceit Of Man" – 4:16
7. "Body And Blood" – 3:07
8. "Rotten I" – 2:39
9. "Suffocation Of Thought" – 3:34
10. "Time Changes Nothing" – 5:39
11. "Slay The Masses" – 3:40

== Personnel ==
- Carl Bouchard - rhythm and lead Guitars
- Yan Chausse - drums
- Kevin Randel - vocals
- Dave B - Bass
- Pierre Remillard - Rhythm Guitar
- Engineered by Pierre Remillard
- Mixed by Pierre Remillard @ Wild Studio
- Mastered by Howie Weinberg @ MasterDisk, New York

== =Further reading ==
- Puckett, Jeffrey L. "Headline: Mould Revisits Pop on 'Body of Song'." Courier - Journal, 26 July, 2005. ProQuest, https://www.proquest.com/newspapers/headline-mould-revisits-pop-on-body-song/docview/241307235/se-2
- "Top 10 Picks from our Music Critics: [Final Edition]." The Ottawa Citizen, 31 Dec., 2005, pp. F2. ProQuest, https://www.proquest.com/newspapers/top-10-picks-our-music-critics/docview/240932137/se-2
- Strength Through Vengeance blabbermouth review
- A Perfect Murder - Strength Through Vengeance | Anmeldelse
