= Seven Souls =

Studio album by Material
- Released: 1989
- Studio: Platinum Island Studio and BC Studio, New York
- Genre: No wave
- Label: Virgin, CDV 2596
- Producer: Bill Laswell, Material

Material chronology
One Down (1982)	Seven Souls (1989)	The Third Power (1991)

Professional ratings
Review scores
Source	Rating
Allmusic	4/5 stars
Spin Alternative Record Guide	6/10

Seven Souls is a 1989 album by the American music group Material. A collaboration with author William S. Burroughs, the album features his narration of passages from his novel The Western Lands (1987) set to musical accompaniment.

The album was re-released in 1997 with bonus tracks, three re-mixes that were added to the beginning of the album. In 1998, a new title, The Road to the Western Lands, was issued, composed of new mixes of the tracks.

"Equation" / "Ineffect" was released as a single in 1989 (Virgin America, PR 3380).

== Track listing ==
1. "Ineffect" (Bill Laswell, Nicky Skopelitis, William S. Burroughs, Simon Shaheen) – 7:34
2. "Seven Souls" (Laswell, Burroughs) – 5:42
3. "Soul Killer" (Laswell, Burroughs) – 4:32
4. "The Western Lands" (Laswell, Skopelitis, Burroughs) – 6:54
5. "Deliver" (Laswell, Skopelitis, Foday Musa Suso) – 5:48
6. "Equation" (Laswell, Skopelitis, Rammellzee) – 5:06
7. "The End of Words" (Laswell, Burroughs) – 5:06

=== Seven Souls (Remix) ===
1. "The Western Lands" [a Dangerous Road Mix] (Laswell, Burroughs) – 8:31
2. "Seven Souls" [Tim Simenon Mix] (Tim Simenon, Burroughs) – 7:06
3. "Soul Killer" [Remote Control Mix by Terre Thaemlitz] (Terre Thaemlitz, Burroughs) – 8:15

The rest of the album as per the original release

=== The Road to the Western Lands ===
1. Bill Laswell – "The Seven Souls" (Burroughs, Laswell) – 5:47
2. Talvin Singh – "The Western Lands" (Burroughs, Talvin Singh) 6:36
3. DJ Soul Slinger – "The Western Lands" (Burroughs, DJ Soul Slinger) 5:09
4. Spring Heel Jack – "The Road to the Western Lands" (Burroughs, John Coxon, Ashley Wales) 6:17
5. The Audio Janitor (DJ Olive) – "Joan's Haunted Hints at the Gate to the Western Lands" (Burroughs, DJ Olive) 6:37
6. Bill Laswell – "Seven Souls" [The Secret Name] (Burroughs, Laswell) 10:37
7. Material – "The Western Lands" [A Dangerous Road Mix] (Burroughs, Laswell) – 8:31

== Personnel ==
Material

- Bill Laswell – 4, 6 and 8-string basses, acoustic guitar, tapes, percussion

Additional personnel

- William S. Burroughs – voice
- Rammellzee – voice ("Equation")
- Foday Musa Suso – voice ("Deliver")
- Fahiem Dandan – voice ("Ineffect")
- Nicky Skopelitis – 6 and 12 string guitars, baglama, coral sitar, saz, Fairlight CMI
- Simon Shaheen – violin
- L. Shankar – violin
- Jeff Bova – electronic keyboards
- Sly Dunbar – drums, Fairlight
- Aïyb Dieng – percussion

"The Western Lands" [a Dangerous Road Mix]

- Jah Wobble – bass
- Bill Laswell – bass samples
- Nicky Skopelitis – guitar
- Tetsu Inoue – electronics
- DJ Spooky – noise

"The Seven Souls" [The Secret Name]

- Alicia Renee aka Blue Eyes: vocals
- Nicky Skopelitis: guitar
- Bill Laswell: bass, keyboards, turntable

=== Production ===
- Recorded at Platinum Island Studio and BC Studio, New York.
- Produced by Bill Laswell / Material.

== Release history ==
- Seven Souls – 1989 – Virgin, CDV 2596 (CD)
- Seven Souls (Remix) – 1997 – Triloka Records, 314 534 905-2 (CD)
- The Road to the Western Lands – 1998 – Triloka / Mercury, 314 558 021-2 (2x 12" / CD)

== In popular culture ==
The track "Seven Souls" is featured in the opening scene and in the closing credits of The Sopranos Season 6 episode, "Members Only".
