= One Down =

Studio album by Material
- Released: May 19, 1982
- Recorded: O.A.O Studio, Brooklyn, New York and RPM Sound Studio, New York City
- Label: Celluloid, Elektra, 60206
- Producer: Material

Material chronology
| Bustin' Out (1981) | One Down (1982) | Seven Souls (1989) |

Professional ratings
Review scores
| Source | Rating |
|---|---|
| AllMusic | 4/5 stars |
| The Rolling Stone Jazz Record Guide | 2/5 stars |
| Select | 2/5 stars |
| Spin Alternative Record Guide | 9/10 |

One Down is a 1982 album by the New York based music group Material. The album finds Material moving away from their noisy no wave roots towards funk and R&B. The album was self-produced by Material, and was recorded by Martin Bisi in Brooklyn and Robert Musso in Manhattan. The album sees the band reduced to a duo of keyboardist Michael Beinhorn and bassist Bill Laswell, collaborating with different musicians and singers on each track. Whitney Houston made her recording debut as a lead vocalist on this album, for a version of the song "Memories".

== Song background ==
"Let Me Have It All" is a cover from Sly and the Family Stone's 1973 album Fresh.

"Memories" featured vocals by Whitney Houston accompanied by Archie Shepp on tenor saxophone. The track marks Houston's first appearance on record as a lead vocalist on an album, prior to her own albums and would be performed at select dates during her first major tour in 1986, The Greatest Love World Tour. The song's keyboard player, Raymond Jones, co-wrote "Someone for Me" on her debut album, and drummer J.T. Lewis also contributed to the recording. The song was written by Hugh Hopper and originally recorded by The Wilde Flowers with vocals by Robert Wyatt.

A dance mix by John Luongo of "I'm the One"/"Don't Lose Control" was released as a 12" single in 1982 (Celluloid/Elektra, 0-67970). Mixes of "Time Out" was released as a 12" single in 1983 (Elektra, 0-67916).

== Track listing ==
1. "Take a Chance" (Bill Laswell, Michael Beinhorn) – 4:31
2. "I'm the One" (Laswell, Beinhorn, R. Bernard Fowler) – 5:25
3. "Time Out" (Laswell, Thi-Linh Le, Beinhorn) – 4:52
4. "Let Me Have It All" (Sly Stewart) – 5:23
5. "Come Down" (Laswell, Beinhorn, Fowler) – 4:43
6. "Holding On" (Laswell, Beinhorn, Brian Eno) – 4:40
7. "Memories" (Hugh Hopper) (featuring Whitney Houston) – 3:58
8. "Don't Lose Control" (Laswell, Beinhorn) – 4:18

=== CD bonus track ===
9. "Bustin' Out" (Laswell, Beinhorn, Fred Maher) – 8:03

== Personnel ==
Material

- Michael Beinhorn – Prophet-5, Oberheim OB-Xa, Oberheim DMX sequencer, Roland TR-808 drum machine, Roland VP330 vocoder, tapes, percussion
- Bill Laswell – Music Man Sting Ray bass, Fender Precision bass, effects

vocalists

- Nona Hendryx – vocals ("Take a Chance", "Let Me Have It All", "Bustin' Out")
- B.J. Nelson – vocals ("Take a Chance", "Let Me Have It All", "Holding On")
- R. Bernard Fowler – vocals ("I'm the One", "Come Down")
- Thi-Linh Le – voice ("Time Out")
- Noris Night – voice ("Let Me Have It All")
- Whitney Houston – vocals ("Memories")
- Jean Karakos – voice ("Don't Lose Control")

musicians

- Nile Rodgers – guitar ("I'm the One", "Come Down")
- Fred Frith – guitar ("Time Out")
- Nicky Skopelitis – guitar ("Take a Chance", "Holding On")
- Ronny Drayton – guitar ("Let Me Have It All", "Holding On", "Bustin' Out")
- J.T. Lewis – drums ("Take a Chance", "Time Out", "Holding On")
- Yogi Horton – drums ("Let Me Have It All", "Memories")
- Tony Thompson – drums ("I'm the One", "Come Down", "Don't Lose Control")
- Fred Maher – drums ("Bustin' Out")
- Nicky Marrero – percussion ("Take a Chance", "Time Out", "Holding On")
- Daniel Ponce – bongos ("I'm the One", "Don't Lose Control")
- Oliver Lake – tenor and alto saxophone ("Come Down")
- Archie Shepp – tenor saxophone ("Memories")
- Raymond Jones – Yamaha CP-70B electric grand piano ("Memories")

== Production ==
- Produced by Material
- Recorded at O.A.O Studio (Brooklyn, New York) by Martin Bisi and at RPM Sound Studio (Manhattan, New York) by Robert Musso

== Release history ==
- 1982 – Celluloid / Vogue (Fr.), CEL 541003 (LP)
- 1982 – Elektra (USA), 60206 (LP)
- 1982 – Celluloid, CELCD 5504 (CD)
- 1983 – CBS / Sony (Jp.), 25 AP 2754 (LP)
- 1992 – Metronome / Restless, 7 72654-2 (CD)
- 1992 – Demon / MauMau, MauCD 624 (CD)
- 1992 – Jimco, Jp., JICK 89047 (CD)
- 1997 – Movie Play Gold, MPG 74047 (CD)
- 2005 – Golden Stars, GSS 5406 (CD, Portugal, retitled CD 1)
