= Mantra (Material song) =

Single by Material

from the album Hallucination Engine
- Released: 1993
- Length: 5 min., 17 min. mix
- Label: Island
- Songwriter(s): Bill Laswell and Lakshminarayana Shankar.

"Mantra" is a 1993 song and single by Material from the album Hallucination Engine, composed by Bill Laswell and Lakshminarayana Shankar. "Mantra" received favourable reviews in Spin, The Wire and Stereophile. The album version was remixed by The Orb to a 17-minute track for the single, and also given a 5-minute version.

"Mantra" begins with a "wailing Middle Eastern introduction", an ambient drone played by Shankar on electric violin, and is then propelled by tandem tablas of Zakir Hussain and Trilok Gurtu.

It was issued as a 12" and CD single in 1993 (Axiom / Island, AXMCD1) featuring the 17 minute "Praying Mantra Mix" by The Orb, the album's 8 minute "Doors of Perception Mix", and a 5-minute edit.
