= Axiom (record label) =

- Parent company: Palm Pictures
- Founded: 1990
- Founder: Chris Blackwell; Bill Laswell
- Defunct: 1997
- Status: Inactive
- Distributor(s): Bandcamp
- Genre: World music, avant-garde jazz, field recordings
- Country of origin: U.S.
- Location: Brooklyn, New York

Axiom was a record label founded by musician Bill Laswell in 1990 with the support of Chris Blackwell, founder of Island Records.

== History ==
In 1989, Chris Blackwell sold Island to PolyGram, which in 2000 became a subsidiary of Universal Music Group, with Blackwell remaining as CEO. In 1997, he resigned from PolyGram after struggling with what he saw as restrictive oversight of his management. Axiom was shut down but was reactivated when Blackwell started Palm Pictures. Palm scaled back its involvement in the music business, making Axiom dormant again.

Axiom released Sonny Sharrock's Ask the Ages and Henry Threadgill's Too Much Sugar for a Dime, as well as records by Laswell's bands such as Praxis and Material.

A series of world music titles were also released by Axiom, including Simon Shaheen's tribute to Mohammed Abdel Wahab, Shankar's Soul Searcher and field recordings of Gnawa music in Morocco, Mandinka & Fulani Music of the Gambia, and the Master Musicians of Jajouka in the Rif Mountains of Morocco.

After moving to Palm Pictures, Axiom released only a handful of albums, notably by Material and the group Tabla Beat Science, which included Laswell, Zakir Hussain, Karsh Kale, and Ustad Sultan Khan.

== Artists ==
- Umar Bin Hassan
- Zakir Hussain
- Karsh Kale
- Ustad Sultan Khan
- Material
- Praxis
- Simon Shaheen
- L. Shankar
- Sonny Sharrock
- Tabla Beat Science
- Henry Threadgill
