= The Third Power =

Studio album by Material
- Released: 1991
- Recorded: Greenpoint, BC and Platinum Island Studios, New York
- Genre: Funk, dub, rap
- Label: Axiom / Island, 422-848-417-2
- Producer: Bill Laswell

Material chronology
Seven Souls (1991)	The Third Power (1991)	Live in Japan (1993)

Professional ratings
Review scores
Source	Rating
Allmusic	3/5 stars
Spin Alternative Record Guide	7/10

The Third Power is a 1991 album by the New York based music group Material. The album mixes reggae, funk, dub and rap music.

Engineer Martin Bisi claims the album began as a Sly and Robbie record but "Bill really took over... And then, before you know it, the record's done and they're staring at something that they don't recognize... suddenly [they] woke up and were like, 'This is not our record and we don't want it to come out with our name on it,' and Bill just ended up calling it a Material record, The Third Power".

The Jamaican reggae rhythm section of Sly and Robbie write and perform, and there is a vocal by dancehall singer Shabba Ranks on the opening track.

Bootsy Collins from the Parliament-Funkadelic collective is also prominent as a writer and performer, and others from the p-funk collective include Gary Mudbone Cooper, Bernie Worrell, Michael Hampton and Garry Shider, and the Horny Horns of Fred Wesley, Maceo Parker and Pee Wee Ellis.

From the world of jazz, Herbie Hancock and Henry Threadgill contribute. Rappers Baby Bam and Mike G from the Jungle Brothers provide vocals on one track, and The Last Poets' Jalaluddin Mansur Nuriddin contributes vocals to two.

"Reality" was issued as a CD single in 1993 (Axiom/Island, AXMCD 2) with the album version, "Virtual Reality Mix" by Bill Laswell and "Dancehall Mix" by Sly Dunbar. The "Virtual Reality Mix" was included on Axiom Collection: Manifestation.

"Playin' with Fire" was issued as a 12" single in 1992 (Axiom/Island, 422-866 499-1) featuring mixes "Ft. Greene Playground" and "Hip Brick Burnout Remix" by Eric Sadler and Chris Champion, and "Third Power Version" and "Praxis Edit" by Bill Laswell and Jason Corsaro. The "Praxis Edit" was included on Axiom Collection: Manifestation.

"Cosmic Slop" is a cover from Funkadelic's 1973 song Cosmic Slop, which also appeared on Axion Funk: Funkcronomicon and Axiom Collection: Illuminations.

"Mellow Mood" is a cover of Bob Marley and The Wailers 1967 single.

== Track listing ==
1. "Reality" (Shabba Ranks, Bill Laswell, Sly Dunbar, Robbie Shakespeare) – 5:15
2. "Playin' with Fire" (Nathaniel Hall, Michael Small, Laswell, Bootsy Collins, Dunbar, Shakespeare) – 5:14
3. "Cosmic Slop" (George Clinton, Bernie Worrell) – 5:15
4. "E-Pluribus-Unum" (Jalaluddin Mansur Nuriddin, Laswell, Dunbar, Shakespeare) – 3:40
5. "Drive-By" (Laswell, Dunbar, Shakespeare) – 3:21
6. "Power of Soul (Black Chant)" (Nuriddin, Laswell, Collins, Dunbar, Shakespeare) – 5:24
7. "Mellow Mood" (Bob Marley) – 4:22
8. "Glory" (Laswell, Collins, Dunbar, Shakespeare) – 4:33

== Personnel ==
=== Material ===
- Bill Laswell – production

=== Additional musicians ===
- Jungle Brothers (Baby Bam and Mike G) – vocals ("Playin' with Fire")
- Jalaluddin Mansur Nuriddin – vocals ("E-Pluribus-Unum", "Power of Soul (Black Chant)")
- Shabba Ranks – vocals ("Reality")
- Bootsy Collins – backing vocals and guitar
- Gary Shider – vocals ("Cosmic Slop") and guitar
- Gary Mudbone Cooper – backing vocals
- Jenny Peters – backing vocals
- Herbie Hancock – piano
- Bernie Worrell – piano and organ
- Jeff Bova – synths
- Henry Threadgill – flute
- Robbie Shakespeare – bass
- Nicky Skopelitis – guitar and Fairlight CMI
- Michael Hampton – guitar
- Aïyb Dieng – percussion
- Sly Dunbar – drums and drum programming

Brass section

- Arranged and conducted by Henry Threadgill
- Olu Dara – cornet and African trumpet
- Joe Daley – baritone horn
- Richard Harper – euphonium
- Marcus Rojas – tuba
- Joel Brandon – whistling

String section

- Material strings arranged and conducted by Karl Berger

Horn section

- Fred Wesley – trombone
- Maceo Parker – alto sax
- Pee Wee Ellis – tenor sax

=== Production ===
- Recorded at Greenpoint Studio, B.C. Studio and Platinum Island Studio, New York.
- Produced by Bill Laswell.
- Engineers Robert Musso, Oz Fritz and Martin Bisi.
- Mixed by Jason Corsaro at Platinum Island Studios
- Cover by Thi-Linh Le.

== Release history ==
- 1991 – Axiom / Island, 422-848-417-2 (CD)
- 1991 – Axiom / Island / BMG, 926 9526 (CD)
