= Michael Beinhorn =

American musician and record producer (born 1960)

- Born: Michael James Beinhorn; March 26, 1960 (age 66); New York City, U.S.
- Occupations: Musician; record producer

Michael James Beinhorn (born March 26, 1960) is an American record producer, composer, author, and musician. He has produced albums for Red Hot Chili Peppers, Soundgarden, Hole, Korn, Kensington, Ozzy Osbourne and Marilyn Manson.

== Career ==
=== 1977–1983: early years, Material, Herbie Hancock ===
Beinhorn began his career as a keyboardist specializing in synthesizers. His first instrument was a Moog Micromoog, after which he began working with a Sequential Circuits Prophet 5, an EMS Synthi AKS, Oberheim OB-Xa and Rhodes Chroma, as well as other instruments such as a Roland TR-808 drum machine, Roland SVC-350 Vocoder, Oberheim DMX drum machine and Oberheim DSX sequencer. Later, he began using such instruments as ARP 2600, as well as Moog modular and Serge Modular systems. He received formal training in synthesizer programming on the Buchla 200 series modular systems at Public Access Synthesizer Studio in New York City.

In 1977, Beinhorn met bassist Bill Laswell and together, with his friends Fred Maher and Cliff Cultreri, they formed the Zu Band. The group was named by impresario Giorgio Gomelsky.

After Gomelsky produced the Zu Band's first recording, the group ended their relationship with him and began self-producing. About a year following their first release and their first shows in New York City (at such nightclubs as CBGB, Mudd Club, Hurrah and Tier 3), they changed their band name to Material.

By 1980, Maher and Cultreri had left Material. As a duo, Beinhorn and Laswell collaborated on various projects with a variety of musical artists, such as Nile Rodgers, David Byrne, Sonny Sharrock, Nona Hendryx, Bernie Worrell, Patti LaBelle, Tony Thompson, etc.

One ongoing collaboration was with Brian Eno and eventually yielded the track "Lizard Point" from the 4th and final recording in Eno's Ambient series, Ambient 4: On Land. The following year, the duo recorded a young up-and-coming singer named Whitney Houston on a version of the Soft Machine song "Memories" which also featured the free jazz tenor sax player, Archie Shepp.

That year (1981), they produced and composed "Change the Beat" by Fab Five Freddy which became the source of the infamous "Fresh Scratch" (which included the sound of a voice controlling the Oberheim OBXa synthesizer through the Roland SVC350 vocoder reciting "Ahhhh... this stuff is really frrreshh"). This led to Beinhorn's work in 1983 on Herbie Hancock's record Future Shock which included the groundbreaking track, "Rockit" (which featured the first ever usage of the "Fresh Scratch" as a turntable scratch. Another element was its usage of programmed drum fill breaks as thematic motifs). Beinhorn co-produced, co-wrote, and programmed the Oberheim DMX drum machine, synthesizers and Lexicon M.93 Prime Time sampler on the track. As a result of its usage in "Rockit", the "Fresh Scratch" has subsequently become the most sampled sound in the world.

Along with such seminal recordings as "The Message" by Grandmaster Flash and the Furious Five, "Planet Rock" by Soulsonic Force and "Numbers" by Kraftwerk, "Rockit" was one of the most important recordings from the early 1980s that helped elevate the nascent form of hip hop from an underground music genre, into the international spotlight. Having the distinction of being one of the earliest videos on MTV, "Rockit" also had a much greater reach and success than any of its predecessors. The track went on to win Best R&B Instrumental Performance at the 1984 Grammy Awards (also receiving a nomination for Best Instrumental Composition), as well as five VMA's at the 1984 MTV Video Music Awards where Herbie was the show's most awarded artist.

=== 1984–1989: leaving Material, work with Red Hot Chili Peppers ===
Beinhorn set out on his own, leaving Material in 1984. Two years later, he found himself in a speeding van with struggling Los Angeles band Red Hot Chili Peppers who were late to a gig in Dallas, Texas. The result of that van ride was 1987's The Uplift Mofo Party Plan, which finally put the band on the map. The record was as much a chronicle of Los Angeles- the city the band loved- as it was of their lives and the unlikely journey everyone went through to get the record made. Bass player Flea later referred to the album as "the 'rockingest' record" the band has ever made.

The unexpected success of Uplift gave Red Hot Chili Peppers a leg up with their label, EMI, and in 1989, Beinhorn produced the group's next recording, Mother's Milk. This recording featured their first breakthrough international hit single, "Higher Ground". Mothers Milk went on to sell over one million records in the United States as of 1995 and brought the band international renown.

=== 1989–1994: producing Soul Asylum, Soundgarden ===
After his success with Red Hot Chili Peppers, Beinhorn began a working streak which culminated in him producing Soul Asylum's 1992 breakthrough record, Grave Dancers Union. The third single from this record, "Runaway Train" went to number five on the Billboard Top 100 singles chart, selling 600,000 copies, and its video received significant airplay on MTV. The album spent 76 weeks in the Billboard Top 200 Album charts, sold over three million copies in the United States (as of 1993), and netted the band a 1994 Grammy Award for Best Rock Song.

Beinhorn's next production was for the Seattle band, Soundgarden. The result of their collaboration was the 1994 album Superunknown, which reached number one on the Billboard 200 album charts in its first week of release (directly above Nine Inch Nails' The Downward Spiral). Eventually spawning 5 singles, including "Black Hole Sun", Superunknown netted the band two 1995 Grammy Awards (Best Hard Rock/Metal Performance for "Black Hole Sun" and Best Rock Song for "Spoonman") and sold over 9 million copies worldwide as of 1995. In an appearance on The Pods & Sods Network, Beinhorn shared his reaction to first hearing "Black Hole Sun" during the Superunknown sessions:

I think for the rest of my entire life, until I draw my last breath, I'll never ever forget how I felt when they started playing that song. From the very first few notes, I felt like I'd been hit by a thunderbolt. I was just absolutely stunned. What in the world is this? I get goosebumps thinking about it now.

=== 1995–1999: two-inch eight-track, Hole, Marilyn Manson ===
Over the next three years, Beinhorn produced records for Aerosmith, Ozzy Osbourne, Living Colour and Social Distortion. In 1994, he conceived of a new multitrack recording format – an analog 8-track tape recorder with a 2-inch head block that also included a time code reader so it could sync with other tape machines, consoles, etc. The system was dubbed "Ultra-Analog" by CN Fletcher of Mercenary Audio and had its maiden voyage on the 1995 Ozzy Osbourne record Ozzmosis.

In 1997, Beinhorn was approached by the group Hole to produce their next recording. The resulting project was called Celebrity Skin, which took nearly a year to finish, and spawned 2 singles ("Celebrity Skin", "Malibu") and sold nearly 4 million records worldwide. As well as receiving two Grammy Nominations in 1999, it is number 871 in the book "1001 Records To Hear Before You Die". Celebrity Skin was still being mixed when Beinhorn moved on to his next project- Marilyn Manson iconic Mechanical Animals. Coincidentally, both records were finished and released at the same time, giving Beinhorn the distinction of being the first record producer in history to have two records debut in the Top Ten positions of the Billboard album charts, (with Manson at number 1 and Hole at number 9) in the same week (September 15, 1998). As a result, Beinhorn was nominated for Producer of the Year at the 1999 Grammy Awards.

=== 2000–2002: Atlantic Records, Korn ===
From 1999 to 2002, Beinhorn held an Executive Vice President A&R position at Atlantic Records. During this period, Beinhorn collaborated with artists such as Pharrell Williams, André 3000 and Chad Hugo, and contributed to the film Any Given Sunday.

After leaving Atlantic, Beinhorn returned to independent record production, where he produced Korn's Untouchables. The album entered the Billboard Top 200 Album Chart at number two, selling 434,000 copies in its first week of release. It also netted Korn the 2004 Grammy Award for Best Metal Performance, for the song "Here to Stay". Jonathan Davis has described Beinhorn as adopting a perfectionist approach to recording of Untouchables:

Beinhorn's whole vision was to make an amazing sounding rock record that could never be made again. [...] I wanted to shoot a documentary about that record. We spent so much money, on the drums alone we spent a whole month just getting drum sounds. There were 50 mics just on the drumset that they picked out and tested. [...] Usually, I do my vocals and it takes me a month or two weeks, but just vocals it took me five, almost six months. With Beinhorn, sometimes I'd walk in and sing and he'd just say, "Go home, your voice ain't right." [...] It was the peak and pinnacle of everything in Korn. I still can't believe how much work went in on it.

=== 2003–present ===
From 2003, Beinhorn went on to work with a diverse array of artists such as Fuel, Mew, The Bronx, Courtney Love, Pete Yorn, Natalie Maines, Leon Russell and Dave Grohl. In 2015, Beinhorn wrote a book called "Unlocking Creativity" about his experience with the creative process as a record producer.

Most recently, Beinhorn has been promoting remote pre-production as a countermeasure to the shrinking recording budgets in the music industry. In 2018, he launched Beinhorn Creative as a fully remote pre-production service.

== Productions discography ==
- 1979: Temporary Music 1 – Material
- 1980: Temporary Music 2 – Material
- 1981: Memory Serves – Material
- 1981: Nona – Nona Hendryx
- 1981: Change The Beat – Fab Five Freddy
- 1982: One Down – Material
- 1983: Future Shock – Herbie Hancock
- 1983: The Art of Defense – Nona Hendryx
- 1984: At the Feet of the Moon – The Parachute Club
- 1986: Love's Imperfection – Idle Eyes
- 1987: The Uplift Mofo Party Plan – Red Hot Chili Peppers
- 1989: Mother's Milk – Red Hot Chili Peppers
- 1990: Mercurotones – The Buck Pets
- 1991: Why Do Birds Sing? – Violent Femmes
- 1991: Hot Diggity – Raw Youth
- 1992: Grave Dancers Union – Soul Asylum
- 1992: Soul Martini – Cavedogs
- 1993: Numb – Hammerbox
- 1993: Far Gone – Love Battery
- 1994: "Sunshine of Your Love" – Living Colour
- 1994: Superunknown – Soundgarden
- 1994: "Blind Man" and "Walk on Water" – Aerosmith
- 1995: Ozzmosis – Ozzy Osbourne
- 1996: White Light, White Heat, White Trash – Social Distortion
- 1997: Big Windshield Little Mirror – Foam
- 1998: Celebrity Skin – Hole
- 1998: Mechanical Animals – Marilyn Manson
- 1999: The Verve Pipe – The Verve Pipe
- 1999: "Be a Man" – Hole
- 2000: "Painted on My Heart" – The Cult
- 2002: Untouchables – Korn
- 2003: Natural Selection – Fuel
- 2003: Greatest Hits – Red Hot Chili Peppers
- 2004: Lest We Forget: The Best Of – Marilyn Manson
- 2005: Permanent Record: The Very Best of Violent Femmes – Violent Femmes
- 2005: The Best of Fuel – Fuel
- 2005: And the Glass Handed Kites – Mew
- 2006: A Public Display of Affection – The Blizzards
- 2006: Shot to Hell – Black Label Society
- 2006: Nightcrawler – Pete Yorn
- 2006: The Bronx – The Bronx
- 2007: Everything Last Winter – Fields
- 2008: The Sucker Punch Show – Lovedrug
- 2008: Domino Effect – The Blizzards
- 2010: Nobody's Daughter – Hole
- 2015: + − (plus minus) – Mew
- 2014: "You Know My Name" / "Wedding Day" – Courtney Love
- 2016: Control – Kensington
- 2021: Van Weezer – Weezer (Pre-production)
- 2023: Hitchhiker – Cuco
