= Material (band) =

American band (1979–1999)

- Genres: No wave; rock; experimental; dance-punk; funk; jazz; post-disco
- Years active: 1979–1999
- Labels: ZE; Axiom; Celluloid
- Past members: Bill Laswell; Michael Beinhorn; Fred Maher; Daevid Allen; Martin Bisi; Bill Bacon; Cliff Cultreri; Michael Lawrence

Material was an American band formed in 1979 and operating until 1999, led by producer and bassist Bill Laswell.

The group began in 1978 coalescing at Giorgio Gomelsky's Zu House in Manhattan with at its core Laswell, Michael Beinhorn, Fred Maher, Cliff Cultreri and Kramer, acting as a house band for visiting European musicians, such as Daevid Allen. Laswell, Beinhorn, Maher and Cultreri evolved as Material in 1979 first releasing the Temporary Music EP, followed by two more albums (Memory Serves and One Down) with an ever-revolving list of contributors, including singers such as Nona Hendryx, Bernard Fowler and Whitney Houston.

From 1982, the name would be used by Laswell and Beinhorn for many projects, including Herbie Hancock's Future Shock album and "Rockit" single, Timezone's "World Destruction" single, and from 1985 onward solely by Laswell such as on Sly and Robbie's Rhythm Killers and Public Image Ltd.'s Album.

Laswell would continue with the name as a front for his own projects up until 1999, releasing four more studio albums (Seven Souls, The Third Power, Hallucination Engine and Intonarumori).

== History ==
=== 1978–1979: Formation ===
In 1978, having received a substantial royalty payment for his work with The Yardbirds, Georgian music entrepreneur Giorgio Gomelsky relocated to New York City in an attempt to open up the American market to the European progressive jazz-rock bands he was working with, such as Gong, Henry Cow and Magma. He established the Zu Club in Manhattan and after meeting 24-year-old bass player Bill Laswell, encouraged him to form a band. Three young friends, Michael Beinhorn (17, synthesizer), Martin Bisi (17, engineering) and Fred Maher (14, drums), responded to Laswell's advert in The Village Voice and the band began rehearsing in the club's basement. They were joined by guitartist Cliff Cultreri and then by organist Mark Kramer, who had befriended Gomelsky while attending a Captain Beefheart concert.

The band became known as the "Zu Band" until Gomelsky hooked them up with former Gong frontman Daevid Allen for a performance at his Zu Manifestival at the Zu Club on October 8, 1978, for which they became "New York Gong". They were joined at this performance by saxophonist George Bishop and drummer Chris Cutler who were working on Allen's N'Existe Pas album, guitarist Michael Lawrence deputised for Cultreri, while Fred Frith guested on some pieces.

Allen returned in March 1979 and the group of Laswell, Beinhorn, Maher, Cultreri and Kramer were joined by drummer Stu Martin and alto-saxophonist Don Davis, a friend of Kramer. They toured North America in an old school bus from April into June playing most of Gong's Radio Gnome Invisible trilogy, with Martin departing after a few weeks, his place being taken by another of Kramer's friends, Bill Bacon. In autumn, they recorded the album About Time, followed by a September and October tour of France, after which Allen and the band amicably parted company when they "discovered they couldn't stand the European way of life". (Note: Kramer would work again with Allen, recording the albums Who's Afraid? (1992) and Hit Men (1996) with Bill Bacon, as well as performing live as Brainville and recording The Children's Crusade (1998).)

=== 1979–1982: The band ===
The band then took the name Material, from the Laswell/Cultreri-composed instrumental "Materialism" on the About Time album. Their debut recording was 1979's instrumental industrial funk Temporary Music 1 EP for Gomelsky's Zu Records. Jean Georgakarakos and Jean-Luc Young had been involved with Allen in Paris since 1969 through their various independent record companies (BYG, Tapioca, LTM and Charly). In the late 1970s Karakos started Celluloid with Jean-François Bizot and Gilbert Castro having initial success in France with Jacno and Toure Kunda. He followed Gomelsky to New York and struck up a partnership with Laswell, Celluloid becoming an outlet for Laswell's activity, and Laswell becoming an in-house producer for many of Celluloid's other acts. Their first combined output was Material's "Discourse" single in 1980.

They were reduced back to the trio of Beinhorn, Laswell and Maher for the 1981 EP Temporary Music 2 (included Don Davis on saxophone,"White Man"). The departed Cultreri later worked in A&R for Relativity Records where he is credited with bringing Megadeth, Steve Vai, and Joe Satriani to the label.

The group would play around New York as a three-piece with a revolving list of “front-men” such as guitarists Sonny Sharrock and Fred Frith, saxophonists Byard Lancaster and Henry Threadgill or cornetist Olu Dara. Laswell explained "We have a lot of directions to pursue, we do get involved in quite a few projects, and we like bringing different people into Material. It's healthy for us as players, and it's a way of exposing good musicians to new audiences. But even though we're fluid, we definitely are a band. And since whatever we play tends to have a strong pulse to it, I'd say we're a rock band... Playing with really strong musicians does change our playing, we improvise and play off one another. We may sound somewhat different, depending on who's playing with us, but to me that's an advantage."

The first full album as Material, Memory Serves, was instrumental and featured strong jazz leanings with contributions from Sharrock, Frith, Dara, Threadgill and violinist Billy Bang.

They started working with singers and their music became more melodic and funkier. Their next single "Ciquiri" (included on the American Songs EP) which featured guitarist Robert Quine, became popular in New York City dance clubs. The 1981 "Bustin' Out" single was released as an extended club mix peaking at number two on the dance charts. On "Busting Out", they were fronted by singer Nona Hendryx with support from guitarist Ronnie Drayton. This line-up also recorded "It's a Holiday" for a split single with Cristina.

By 1982's One Down, Maher had left the band (he subsequently became a core member of the second incarnation of Scritti Politti), and they embraced a multitude of singers including Nona Hendryx, B.J. Nelson, R. Bernard Fowler and Whitney Houston (in one of her first recordings). Houston's performance was a cover version of Hugh Hopper's "Memories", which also featured a lead break by saxophonist Archie Shepp. Critic Robert Christgau of The Village Voice called her contribution "one of the most gorgeous ballads you've ever heard". As an indication of the direction the band headed for, Chic's guitarist Nile Rodgers was involved alongside Frith and Drayton, but perhaps more significantly, was one of the first appearances of longtime Laswell collaborator Nicky Skopelitis on guitar.

=== 1982–1989: Collaborations ===
Laswell and Beinhorn settled into a duo and began working with other musicians, producing, writing and performing, with Martin Bisi continuing occasionally as the engineer. They worked initially in the electro genre, but were persuaded to move into the fields of hip-hop and rap by Karakos who had been introduced to likes of turntablist D.St and rappers PHASE 2, Futura 2000 and Fab Five Freddy by Bernard Zekri.

A chance meeting between Laswell and Herbie Hancock at Elektra Records, in which the latter expressed interest in making music in the vein of Malcolm McLaren's "Buffalo Gals", led to a collaboration that brought forth the Future Shock album and the hit single "Rockit". They would collaborate with Hancock on two further albums released under his name, 1984's Sound-System and 1988's Perfect Machine. Hancock himself would go on to contribute to many of Material and Laswell's projects.

In 1984, under the name Timezone, they released the single "World Destruction" which featured disc jockey Afrika Bambaataa and John Lydon (former singer of the Sex Pistols and Public Image Ltd).

In 1985 Laswell and Beinhorn parted company. Beinhorn went into record production for the likes of the Red Hot Chili Peppers and Marilyn Manson. Laswell retained the Material name and was calling upon a large group of musicians with, at its core, guitarist Skopelitis, keyboardist Jeff Bova, percussionist Aiyb Dieng, former Parliament-Funkadelic keyboardist Bernie Worrell and bassist Bootsy Collins, plus Jamaican reggae duo Sly Dunbar and Robbie Shakespeare (Sly and Robbie).

=== 1989–1999: Projects ===
By 1989, Laswell had ceased using the Material name as an umbrella for his own activities and began to use it as a front for specific projects. The first of these projects was the album Seven Souls, featuring William S. Burroughs reading portions of his novel The Western Lands. In 1998, the album was subject to a series of re-mixes by Laswell, Talvin Singh, Spring Heel Jack, DJ Olive and released as The Road to the Western Lands.

The Third Power was released in 1991, with duo Sly and Robbie and Bootsy Collins being Laswell's main collaborators. Vocal performances were given by the Jungle Brothers' Baby Bam and Mike G, The Last Poets's Jalaluddin Mansur Nuriddin, and Shabba Ranks. Other musicians included members of Funkadelic, Herbie Hancock, Henry Threadgill and Olu Dara.

1993's Hallucination Engine was a fusion of jazz, Indian and Middle Eastern influences. Noted jazz players included Wayne Shorter, Jonas Hellborg, and from John McLaughlin's Shakti tabla player Zakir Hussain, violinist L. Shankar and Vikku Vinayakram (on ghatam). Palestinian violinist Simon Shaheen, Indian percussionist Trilok Gurtu, and William S. Burroughs also contributed. "Mantra", an 8-minute track from the album, was given a 17-minute remix by The Orb for the 12" single.

The final release under the name Material was 1999's Intonarumori. Sub-titled "Rap is still an art", it featured contributions from Rammellzee, Kool Keith, Flavor Flav and Killah Priest.

Laswell has on occasion used the name for live performances, the last being at the Bonnaroo Music Festival on June 13, 2004 with, among others, his wife Gigi, drummer Bryan "Brain" Mantia and guitarist Buckethead (both from Laswell's other project, Praxis).

On 5 April 2005, Laswell performed a 2-hour concert at WTTW Studios, Chicago with three incarnations of his groups: Tabla Beat Science (with Zakir Hussein, Ustad Sultan Khan, DJ Disk, Karsh Kale, Selim Merchant and Nils Petter Molvaer), Material (with Pharoah Sanders, Foday Musa Suso, Hamid Drake, Aïyb Dieng and Abegasu Shiota) and Praxis (with Buckethead, Brian "Brain" Mantia and Toshinori Kondo), with Bootsy Collins performing MC duties at its climax. An hour long edit was broadcast on the Soundstage series on 13 July 2006.

== Discography ==
- Temporary Music (1981)
- Memory Serves (1981)
- One Down (1982)
- Seven Souls (1989)
- The Third Power (1991)
- Hallucination Engine (1993)
- Intonarumori (1999)
