= Celluloid Records =

French/American record label

Celluloïd Records
- Founded: 1976
- Founder: Jean Karakos Gilbert Castro
- Genre: Rock; hip-hop; alternative; progressive rock; no-wave; world music
- Country of origin: France
- Location: New-York
- Official website: https://www.karakosproductions.com/celluloid/

Celluloid Records is a French/American record label, founded by Jean Georgakarakos (sometimes shortened to Jean Karakos) operated from 1976 to 1989 in New York City, and produced a series of eclectic and ground-breaking releases, particularly in the early to late 1980s, largely under the auspices of de facto in-house producer Bill Laswell.

Jean Georgakarakos had previously run a chain of record shops in France, Pop Shop, in cities such as Paris, Lyon, Grenoble and Aix-en-Provence. In 1967, he formed jazz record label BYG Records, which collapsed in the mid-1970s. Karakos also produced albums such as Sonny Sharrock's Monkie-Pockie Boo, and some Art Ensemble Of Chicago, Archie Shepp, Don Cherry Magma and Gong material.

== Early releases ==
Celluloid began by releasing American no wave and French avant-garde pop by artists such as Métal Urbain (who were signed to London's Rough Trade Records in the UK), Mathematiques Modernes, James Chance and Alan Vega. It also licensed tracks from other artists and labels, releasing tracks by Soft Cell, The Names, Cabaret Voltaire and Tuxedomoon among others. In the early eighties, Celluloid had a business relationship with Michael Zilkha and Michael Esteban's Ze Records; artists including Was (Not Was), Alan Vega, Suicide and Lydia Lunch released tracks on both labels, sometimes simultaneously, and at least one LP (Vega's eponymous debut) was released with both Celluloid and Ze logos on the sleeve.

== Expansion ==
Thanks to the guidance and participation of then rising producer, Bill Laswell, the 1982 catalogue had expanded to encompass early hip-hop artists such as Afrika Bambaataa (under projects Time Zone, and Shango), Beside (Bernard Zekri's wife), Fab 5 Freddy, Grand Mixer DXT, Phase II -all recorded at Martin Bisi's studio called then O.A.O. in Brooklyn NY; and Tribe 2. Much of the hip-hop projects was produced by the group Material, who had already recorded a number of sides for Celluloid, and whose prime mover Bill Laswell would play an increasing role in the label's fortunes for the next five years. Celluloid also released an album of Futuristic Funk by punk/funk performer and cyberpunk writer John Shirley, John Shirley's Obsession, featuring guitarist Sync66 (Chris Cunningham) and Bassist Jerry Antonias (a.k.a. Jerry Agony) both of whom also played with James Chance (a.k.a. James White). By 1983 the label released KONK Party by New York-based No Wave and Afro Punk group Konk.

Increasingly sought out to produce artists on major labels (such as Nona Hendryx, Yellowman and Herbie Hancock, for whom he produced the Grammy-winning "Rockit"), Laswell still found time to produce and play on Celluloid albums by Massacre (a power trio composed of Laswell, Fred Frith and Fred Maher) and his own group Material (whose One Down of 1983 featured a young Whitney Houston, in her first registered song, alongside Archie Shepp, Brian Eno, Bernard Fowler and Tony Thompson of Chic). Karakos next persuaded Laswell to helm the production suite for Celluloid recordings by African artists such as Toure Kunda, Mandingo and Manu Dibango. At the same time he was asked to remix Fela Kuti's Army Arrangement for Celluloid, the first of many such ventures (he would later remix Bob Marley, Miles Davis and Carlos Santana for major labels).

Celluloid's prolific output continued throughout the mid-eighties. As well as funding Laswell-related productions by Praxis, Time Zone, Shango, B-Side, Deadline, Last Poets, and even a resurrected Jimi Hendrix (appearing posthumously with Lightnin' Rod on the bluesy 12-inch (300 mm) "Doriella Du Fontaine"), Karakos also started a number of associated labels. OAO Records released much of Material's early output as well as albums by the aforementioned Golden Palominos and Cuban percussionist Daniel Ponce. Moving Target catered for the niche post-rock/reggae market, releasing material by Sly and Robbie, Yellowman, Dennis Bovell, Blurt, The Fleshtones, Splatcats and, incredibly, The Flying Pickets. The short-lived Mercenary Records, meanwhile, released straight-ahead rock albums by the Goo Goo Dolls and Victory. An equally short-lived partnership with Morgan Khan, head of Street Sounds, saw albums by B-Side. Manu Dibango and Mandingo licensed for release in the UK on Khan's Streetwave label.

== Decline ==
By 1986, increasing demands on Laswell's time (including work on major label albums by Yoko Ono, Mick Jagger, Motörhead and PiL) meant that his work for Celluloid became more sporadic, though he did produce Horses & Trees for Ginger Baker (whom Laswell had tracked down in Italy and persuaded to play on PiL's Album) and contributed to the Golden Palominos' Blast of Silence and A Dead Horse albums, as well as recording with Last Exit and releasing an album with Peter Brötzmann for Celluloid. The label, meanwhile, continued to release records that did not involve Laswell; this eclectic selection included Eric Dolphy's Iron Man and Conversations, John McLaughlin's Devotion, and Welcome To Dreamland, a compilation of Japanese pop overseen by Fred Frith. African music also featured heavily in Celluloid's mid to late eighties output: Kassav, Toure Kunda, Fela Kuti, and Mahlathini and the Mahotella Queens all released albums through the label. Karakos also kept up his interest in the post-punk scene by releasing a comeback solo album by Television guitarist Richard Lloyd (Field of Fire 1986), as well as a follow-up (Real Time, 1987), and found time to start up two new offshoots, Braziloid and Skaloid, which released, Brazilian and ska music respectively. In conjunction with CBGB, the label issued the 1987 Ritual Tension live album The Blood of the Kid.

== Close of business and aftermath ==
In 1989, Karakos having returned to Paris, produced in partnership with film director, Olivier Lorsac, the zouk/Brazilian music influenced, Kaoma band which consisted of ex-Celluloid recording artists from Toure Kunda and the main group to musically represent the repertoire of the lambada dance music explosion in Europe during that same year. Originally intended for Celluloid's Brazilian division, the lambada music compilation and video was eventually released on CBS Records worldwide, reaching no. 1 on top of the pop music charts in Europe. Facing the worldwide success of the hit, and the necessities of its management, Karakos sold in debt Celluloid to American businessman John Matarazzo for a symbolic dollar. Matarazzo was to repay Celluloid's debt to French Bank Societe Generale, which had mortgaged the whole recording, publishing and branding catalog. As he failed to do so, Societe Generale got back its rights over the catalog and sold it all back to Karakos and his associates of Adageo in 1994.

Laswell had decamped to become a producer for hire and would later found Axiom, under the auspices of Island's Chris Blackwell which continued Celluloid's avant-garde musical policy. The French branch of Celluloid continued to license music for compilations on other labels, notably MauMau and Charly, while releases were sporadic at best, and largely aimed at the French market.

As of 2023, Karakos Productions & Publishing has gained the rights to exploit the Celluloid NY catalogue.

== See also ==
- List of record labels
