= Simon Shaheen =

American composer and musician

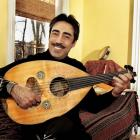
- Shaheen in 1994

Background information
- Born: 1955 (age 70–71); Ma'alot-Tarshiha, Israel
- Occupations: Musician, composer
- Instruments: Oud, violin

Simon Shaheen (Arabic: سيمون شاهين; born in Ma'alot-Tarshiha, Israel) is an American oud and violin player, and composer.

At the age of 2, Shaheen moved with his family to Haifa, but spent most of the weekends in Tarshiha, an Arab village in Upper Galilee. The Shaheen family is known for its musicality with music instructor and father Hikmat, oud-playing and instrument-making brother Najib, violinist and oud playing William, and singing sisters Laura and Rosette.

== Music career ==
Shaheen began playing the oud at 5, and the violin shortly thereafter. He attended Tel Aviv University, earning degrees in Arabic literature and music performance. He later pursued further studies at Hebrew University of Jerusalem. In 1980 he emigrated to the United States to study music at the Manhattan School of Music and Columbia University, eventually becoming a U.S. citizen.

He founded the Near Eastern Music Ensemble and organizes arts festivals and retreats. Shaheen also heads the Arabic Music Retreat, held annually at Mt. Holyoke College's campus in Massachusetts which brings together a large faculty instructing Arabic music for a week and concludes with a concert.

Shaheen, a Catholic Palestinian, lives in New York City, where he leads an Arabic ensemble called Qantara which he formed.

In 1994 he received a National Heritage Fellowship from the National Endowment for the Arts.

In addition to his work in traditional and classical Arabic music, Shaheen has participated in many cross-cultural musical projects, including performing with producer Bill Laswell, Colombian singer Soraya, Henry Threadgill, Vishwa Mohan Bhatt, and with Jewish klezmer musicians The Klezmatics.

== Select discography ==
- 1990 – Music of Waheeb, Mango/Island/PolyGram
- 1990 – The Music of Mohamed Abdel Wahab, Axiom/Island/PolyGram
- 1992 – Turath (Heritage), CMP
- 1993 – Taqasim: Art of Improvisation in Arabic Music
- 1996 – Saltanah (with V. M. Bhatt), Water Lily Acoustics
- 2001 – Blue Flame, Ark 21/Universal
