= Martin Bisi =

American producer and songwriter (born 1961)

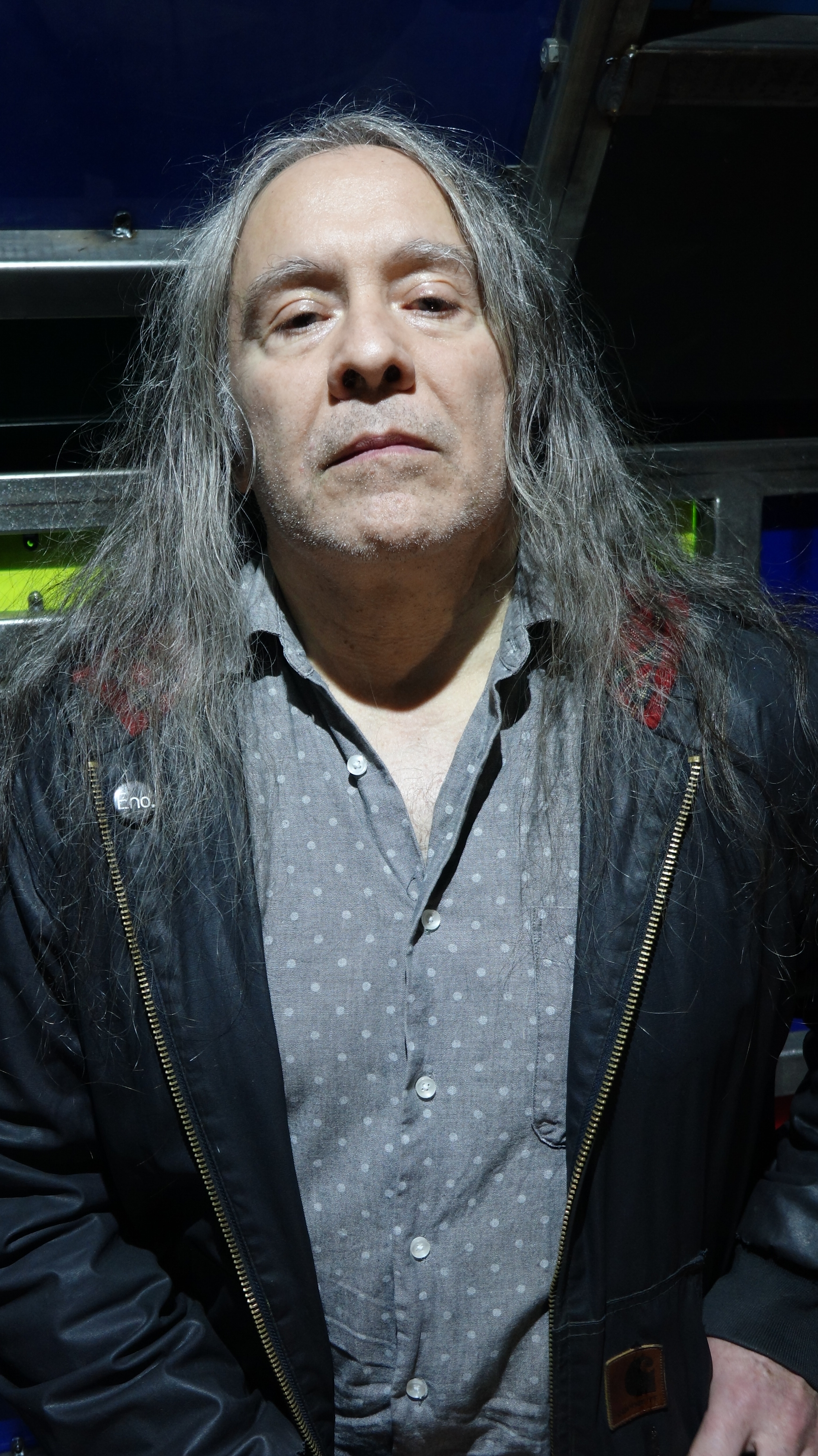

Background information
- Born: 1961 (age 64–65)
- Origin: Brooklyn, New York, U.S.
- Genres: Alternative rock Punk rock Psychedelic; Electro funk
- Years active: 1981–present
- Labels: New Alliance / SST; Celluloid; Black Freighter; Bronson Recordings
- Website: Official website

Martin Bisi (born 1961) is an American producer and songwriter. He is known for recording records by Sonic Youth, Swans, John Zorn, Material, Bill Laswell, Helmet, Unsane, The Dresden Dolls, Cop Shoot Cop, White Zombie, Boredoms, Angels of Light, J.G. Thirlwell, Live Skull, the Art Gray Noizz Quintet, and Herbie Hancock's Grammy-winning song "Rockit".

== Early life ==
Martin Bisi was born in 1961 to Argentinian parents and grew up in Manhattan. His mother was a concert pianist who specialized in Liszt and Chopin and toured extensively, and his father played tango-style piano as a hobby. As a child in the 1960s, his parents sent him to a French school, gave him music lessons, and took him to performances by the New York Philharmonic and the opera, all of which he rebelled against.

== Career ==
In 1981, he started B.C. Studio (initially named OAO, Operation All Out, Studio) with Bill Laswell and Brian Eno in the Gowanus section of Brooklyn, where he recorded much of the No Wave, avant garde, and hip-hop of the early 1980s including Lydia Lunch, Live Skull, Fred Frith and Afrika Bambaataa. In 1982, he recorded the instruments for the first song Whitney Houston recorded as a lead singer, "Memories" off of Material's One Down LP.

Soon after recording Herbie Hancock's "Rockit", Bisi split from Bill Laswell but continued working from BC Studio till present time, with a specialty in loud, dense, often noisy sound, with a focus on local NYC music such as White Hills (band), Clone, Cinema Cinema, and Weeping Icon.

In 2021, he worked with the Hypnagogia album of Travis Duo.

=== Documentary film ===
In 2014, Sound & Chaos: The Story Of BC Studio was released, directed by Sara Leavitt and Ryan Douglass. It followed Bisi's path via the recording space itself, and the music scene and changing urban landscape around it

=== Solo career ===
Bisi also recorded his own material

- Creole Mass (LP -1988 New Alliance/SST) with Lee Ranaldo and Fred Frith
- All Will Be Won (LP -1992 New Alliance/SST)
- See Ya in Tiajuana (EP -1994 New Alliance/SST)
- Dear Papi I'm in Jail (EP -1996 New Alliance/SST)
- Milkyway of Love (LP -1999 Stripmine)
- Sirens of the Apocalypse (LP -2008 Labelship, Black Freighter)
- Son of a Gun (EP -2010 Black Freighter) with Bill Laswell, Brian Viglione, Bob D'Amico
- Ex Nihilo (LP -2014 Labelship, Black Freighter)
- Solstice (LP -2019 Bronson Recordings)
- Feral Myths (LP -2022 Black Freighter)
- Your Ultimate Urban Fantasy (EP -2024 Black Freighter)

The 35 year anniversary of BC Studio was marked by the release of 2 albums BC35 (2018) and BC35: Volume Two (2019) on Bronson Productions. The material on both was recorded in a weekend of performances at BC Studio for the actual anniversary in 2016 by close to 50 musicians who'd worked there over the decades. These were developed into pieces and songs in the following year, as opposed to being purely live recordings.
