= Lalo Schifrin discography =

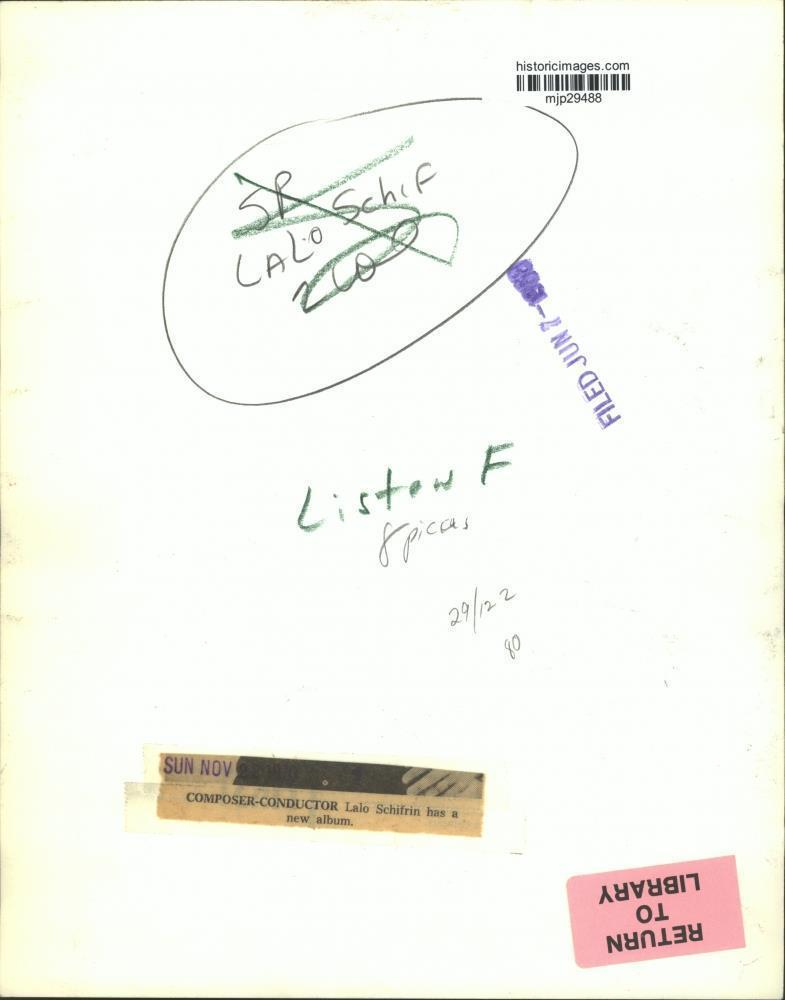
Schifrin in 1968

This is the discography of Argentine-American jazz musician Lalo Schifrin.

== Albums ==
- 1957 Spectrum (Epic)
- 1959 Piano Español (Tico) reissued as Lalolé: The Latin Sound of Lalo Schifrin (Roulette)
- 1962 Lalo = Brilliance (Roulette)
- 1962 Bossa Nova: New Brazilian Jazz (Audio Fidelity) reissued, 2000 as Brazilian Jazz (Aleph)
- 1963 Piano, Strings and Bossa Nova (MGM)
- 1963 Samba Para Dos with Bob Brookmeyer (Verve)
- 1963 Between Broadway & Hollywood (MGM)
- 1964 Explorations with Louis Bellson (Roulette)
- 1964 New Fantasy (Verve)
- 1965 Jazz Suite on the Mass Texts with Paul Horn (RCA Victor)
- 1965 Once a Thief and Other Themes (Verve)
- 1966 The Dissection and Reconstruction of Music From the Past as Performed By the Inmates of Lalo Schifrin's Demented Ensemble as a Tribute to the Memory of the Marquis De Sade (Decca) – Rereleased (Verve, 1997)
- 1967 Music from Mission: Impossible (Dot)
- 1968 There's a Whole Lalo Schifrin Goin' On (Dot)
- 1968 More Mission: Impossible (Paramount)
- 1968 Insensatez (Universal Distribution) – Japanese release
- 1970 En Buenos Aires Grabado En Vivo! (RCA Victor) – Argentinian release
- 1971 Rock Requiem (Decca)
- 1976 Black Widow (CTI)
- 1977 Towering Toccata (CTI)
- 1978 Gypsies (Tabu)
- 1979 No One Home (Tabu)
- 1982 Ins and Outs (Palo Alto)
- 1984 Tank (film)
- 1988 Cantos Aztecas with Plácido Domingo (Pro Arte)
- 1990 Those Fabulous Hollywood Marches with San Diego Symphony Pops Orchestra (Pro-Arte Records)
- 1993 Jazz Meets the Symphony with the London Philharmonic Orchestra (Atlantic) – rec. 1992
- 1993 Lalo Schifrin: Continuum/Journeys/Voyage (Label X)
- 1994 More Jazz Meets the Symphony with the London Philharmonic (Atlantic) – rec. 1993
- 1995 Firebird: Jazz Meets the Symphony No. 3 with the London Philharmonic Orchestra (Four Winds)
- 1995 Lili'uokalani Symphony with the Vienna Symphony Orchestra, Kamehameha Schools Children's Chorus & Honolulu Opera Chorus (Urtext Digital Classics)
- 1996 Music from Mission: Impossible (Polydor)
- 1998 Gillespiana In Cologne (Aleph)
- 1998 Che! (music from the film Che!) (Aleph)
- 1998 Jazz Mass in Concert (Aleph)
- 1998 Metamorphosis: Jazz Meets the Symphony #4 with the London Philharmonic Orchestra (Aleph)
- 1999 Mannix (Aleph)
- 1999 Latin Jazz Suite (Aleph)
- 1999 Lalo Schifrin Conducts Stravinsky, Schifrin and Ravel (Aleph)
- 1999 Jazz Goes to Holywood (Aleph)
- 2000 Esperanto (Aleph)
- 2000 Bullitt (Aleph)
- 2000 Intersections: Jazz Meets the Symphony #5 with the WDR Big Band & the WDR Radio Orchestra of Cologne (Aleph)
- 2001 Schifrin/Schuller/Shapiro: Piano Trios (Naxos)
- 2002 Return of the Marquis deSade (Aleph)
- 2002 Casablanca and Other Hollywood Hits with the Rochester Pops Orchestra (Compendia Music Group / Intersound)
- 2003 Symphonic Impressions of Oman (Scherzo) Rereleased 2017 (Aleph)
- 2005 The Other Side (Audio Fidelity)
- 2005 Letters From Argentina (Aleph)
- 2005 Kaleidoscope: Jazz Meets the Symphony#6 with the Sydney Symphony Orchestra (Aleph)
- 2007 Lalo Schifrin and Friends (Aleph)
- 2008 Mission: Impossible and Other Thrilling Themes (Verve)
- 2011 Invocation: Jazz Meets the Symphony No. 7 with the Czech National Symphony Orchestra (Aleph)
- 2018 The Early Years (Enlightenment) – four-disc set includes ten albums

== Soundtrack albums ==
- 1964: Gone with the Wave (soundtrack) (Colpix)
- 1965: The Liquidator (soundtrack) (MGM)
- 1965: The Cincinnati Kid (soundtrack) (MGM)
- 1966: Murderer's Row (soundtrack) (Colgems)
- 1967: Cool Hand Luke (soundtrack) (Dot)
- 1967: Sol Madrid (soundtrack) (MGM)
- 1968: The Fox (soundtrack) (Warner Bros.)
- 1968: Mannix (Paramount)
- 1968: Bullitt (soundtrack) (Warner Bros.)
- 1968: The Rise And Fall Of The Third Reich (documentary soundtrack) (MGM)
- 1968: Coogan's Bluff (soundtrack) (Universal Pictures)
- 1969: Che! (soundtrack) (Tetragrammaton)
- 1970: Kelly's Heroes (soundtrack) (MGM)
- 1971: Dirty Harry (soundtrack)
- 1973: Enter the Dragon (soundtrack) (Warner Bros.)
- 1973: Magnum Force: The Original Score by Lalo Schifrin (Aleph)
- 1974: The Four Musketeers (Original Motion Picture Score) (Label X)
- 1976: Sky Riders: Music by Lalo Schifrin (Aleph)
- 1977: Voyage of the Damned (soundtrack) (Entr'Acte)
- 1977: Rollercoaster (soundtrack) (MCA)
- 1977: The Eagle Has Landed (Original Score) (Aleph)
- 1979: Boulevard Nights (Original Motion Picture Score) (Varese Sarabande)
- 1979: Escape to Athena (Original Motion Picture Score) (Varese Sarabande)
- 1979: The Amityville Horror (soundtrack) (American International Pictures, Inc.)
- 1980: Serial (Original Motion Picture Soundtrack) (Quartet Records)
- 1980: The Big Brawl (Soundtrack) (Victor)
- 1983: Sudden Impact (Soundtrack) (Aleph)
- 1983: The Osterman Weekend (Soundtrack) (Varese Sarabande)
- 1987: The Fourth Protocol (Soundtrack) (BSX)
- 1988: The Dead Pool (Soundtrack) (Aleph)
- 1990: The Liquidator (Soundtrack) (MCA)
- 1991: F/X2 (Soundtrack) (Quartet Records)
- 1997: Money Talks (Soundtrack) (New Line Cinema)
- 1998: Tango (Soundtrack) (Deutsche Grammophon)
- 1999: The Fox (Soundtrack) (Aleph)
- 2001: Rush Hour 2 (Soundtrack) (Varese Sarabande)
- 2001: Dirty Harry (themes from the Dirty Harry film series) (Aleph / WEA International)
- 2003: The Hellstrom Chronicle (The Original Score by Lalo Schifrin) (Aleph Limited Edition)
- 2005: Les Félins (Original Score) (Aleph)
- 2005: Caveman (Soundtrack) (Aleph)
- 2006: Abominable (Soundtrack) (Aleph)
- 2007: Rush Hour 3 (Soundtrack) (Varese Sarabande)
- 2008: Way... Way Out / Braddock - Premiere (TV series) (Soundtracks) (Intrada)
- 2015: Man on a Swing (Original Motion Picture Soundtrack) (Quartet Records)

== Albums featured ==
With José Carreras, Plácido Domingo and Luciano Pavarotti

- The Three Tenors in Concert (London, 1990) – arranger
- The Three Tenors in Concert 1994 (Atlantic, 1994) – arranger
- The 3 Tenors - Paris 1998 (Atlantic, 1998) – arranger

With Stan Getz

- Reflections (Verve, 1963) - composer, arranger and conductor
- Children of the World (Columbia, 1979) - composer, piano, arranger and conductor

With Dizzy Gillespie

- Gillespiana (Verve, 1960) – composer, piano and arranger
- An Electrifying Evening with the Dizzy Gillespie Quintet (Verve, 1961) – piano
- Carnegie Hall Concert (Verve, 1961) – piano
- A Musical Safari (1961) – piano
- Dizzy on the French Riviera (Philips, 1962) – piano, composer and arranger
- New Wave (Philips, 1962) – piano, arranger
- The New Continent (Limelight, 1962) – piano, composer and arranger
- Something Old, Something New (Philips, 1963) – arranger
- Dizzy Gillespie and the Double Six of Paris (Philips, 1963) – arranger
- Free Ride (Pablo, 1977) – keyboards, composer, arranger and conductor

With Jimmy Smith

- The Cat (Verve, 1964) – conductor and arranger
- The Cat Strikes Again (LaserLight Records, 1980)

With others

- Cannonball Adderley, The Cannonball Adderley Quintet & Orchestra (Capitol, 1970) – composer, conductor and arranger
- Maurice André, Trompettissimo (Erato, 1994) – arranger and conductor
- Count Basie, Back with Basie (Roulette, 1962)
- Louis Bellson, Thunderbird (Impulse!, 1965) – arranger
- Luiz Bonfá, Luiz Bonfa Plays and Sings Bossa Nova (Verve, 1963) – arranger
- Candido Camero, Conga Soul (Roulette, 1962) – piano, composer, arranger
- Eddie Harris, Bossa Nova (Vee-Jay, 1962) – piano, composer, arranger
- Al Hirt, Latin in the Horn (RCA Victor, 1966) – conductor and arranger
- Julia Migenes, Vienna – Julia Migenes / Lalo Schifrin (Erato, 1993) – piano, conductor
- Astor Piazzolla, Two Argentinians in Paris (?, 1955) (BMG, 2005) – piano
- David Shifrin, Shifrin Plays Schifrin (2006, Aleph) – composer and conductor
- Sarah Vaughan, Sweet 'n' Sassy (1963 Roulette Records)
- Cal Tjader, Several Shades of Jade (Verve, 1963)

== Film scores ==
Feature films, documentaries, and short subjects for which Schifrin provided original music. These include films for which he composed the entire score, and others for which he composed the theme or other partial contributions

- 1957: Venga a bailar el rock
- 1958: The Boss
- 1964: Joy House
- 1964: Rhino!
- 1964: See How They Run (TV movie)
- 1965: Dark Intruder
- 1965: Once a Thief
- 1965: The Liquidator
- 1966: Blindfold
- 1966: I Deal in Danger
- 1966: Murderers' Row
- 1966: The Doomsday Flight (TV movie)
- 1966: The Making of a President: 1964 (TV documentary)
- 1966: Way...Way Out
- 1967: Cool Hand Luke
- 1967: How I Spent My Summer Vacation (TV movie)
- 1967: Sullivan's Empire (TV movie)
- 1967: The Fox
- 1967: The President's Analyst
- 1967: The Venetian Affair
- 1967: Who's Minding the Mint?
- 1968: Braddock (TV movie)
- 1968: Bullitt
- 1968: Coogan's Bluff
- 1968: Hell in the Pacific
- 1968: Sol Madrid
- 1968: The Brotherhood
- 1968: The Rise and Fall of the Third Reich (TV documentary)
- 1968: Where Angels Go, Trouble Follows
- 1969: Che!
- 1969: Eye of the Cat
- 1969: The Reivers (Rejected score)
- 1969: Mission Impossible Versus the Mob
- 1970: I Love My Wife
- 1970: Imago
- 1970: Kelly's Heroes
- 1970: Pussycat, Pussycat, I Love You
- 1970: The Aquarians (TV movie)
- 1970: The Mask of Sheba (TV movie)
- 1970: WUSA
- 1971: Dirty Harry
- 1971: Escape (TV movie)
- 1971: Mrs. Pollifax-Spy
- 1971: Pretty Maids All in a Row
- 1971: The Beguiled
- 1971: The Christian Licorice Store
- 1971: The Hellstrom Chronicle
- 1971: THX 1138
- 1972: Joe Kidd
- 1972: Prime Cut
- 1972: Rage
- 1972: The Wrath of God
- 1972: Welcome Home, Johnny Bristol (TV movie)
- 1973: Charley Varrick
- 1973: Egan (TV movie)
- 1973: Enter the Dragon
- 1973: Harry in Your Pocket
- 1973: Hit!
- 1973: Hunter (TV movie)
- 1973: Magnum Force
- 1973: The Neptune Factor
- 1974: Golden Needles
- 1974: Man on a Swing
- 1974: Night Games (TV movie)
- 1974: The Four Musketeers
- 1974: Up from the Ape (documentary)
- 1975: Delancey Street: The Crisis Within (TV movie)
- 1975: Foster and Laurie (TV movie)
- 1975: Guilty or Innocent: The Sam Sheppard Murder Case (TV movie)
- 1975: The Master Gunfighter
- 1976: Brenda Starr (TV movie)
- 1976: Sky Riders
- 1976: Special Delivery
- 1976: St. Ives
- 1976: The Eagle Has Landed
- 1976: Voyage of the Damned
- 1977: Day of the Animals
- 1977: Good Against Evil (TV movie)
- 1977: Rollercoaster
- 1977: Telefon
- 1978: Nunzio
- 1978: Return from Witch Mountain
- 1978: The Cat from Outer Space
- 1978: The Manitou
- 1978: The Nativity (TV movie)
- 1978: The President's Mistress (TV movie)
- 1979: Boulevard Nights
- 1979: Escape to Athena
- 1979: Institute for Revenge (TV movie)
- 1979: Love and Bullets
- 1979: The Amityville Horror
- 1979: The Concorde ... Airport '79
- 1980: Brubaker
- 1980: Serial
- 1980: The Big Brawl
- 1980: The Competition
- 1980: The Nude Bomb
- 1980: When Time Ran Out
- 1981: Buddy Buddy
- 1981: Caveman
- 1981: La pelle
- 1981: Loophole
- 1981: The Fridays of Eternity
- 1982: A Stranger Is Watching
- 1982: Amityville II: The Possession
- 1982: Class of 1984
- 1982: Falcon's Gold (TV movie)
- 1982: Jinxed! (1982) (Rejected score)
- 1982: Fast-Walking
- 1982: The Seduction
- 1982: Victims (TV movie)
- 1982: Wait Until Dark (TV movie)
- 1983: Doctor Detroit
- 1983: Princess Daisy (TV movie)
- 1983: Rita Hayworth: The Love Goddess (TV movie)
- 1983: Starflight: The Plane That Couldn't Land (TV movie)
- 1983: Sudden Impact
- 1983: The Osterman Weekend
- 1983: The Sting II
- 1984: Tank
- 1985: Bad Medicine
- 1985: Bridge Across Time (TV movie)
- 1985: Hollywood Wives (TV movie)
- 1985: Command 5 (TV movie)
- 1985: Private Sessions (TV movie)
- 1985: The Mean Season
- 1985: The New Kids
- 1985: A.D. (TV movie)
- 1986: Beverly Hills Madam (TV movie)
- 1986: Black Moon Rising
- 1986: Kung Fu: The Movie (TV movie)
- 1986: The Ladies Club
- 1986: Triplecross (TV movie)
- 1987: Out on a Limb (TV movie)
- 1987: The Fourth Protocol
- 1988: Berlín Blues
- 1988: Shakedown on the Sunset Strip (TV movie)
- 1988: The Dead Pool
- 1988: Earth Star Voyager (TV mini series)
- 1989: Original Sin (TV movie)
- 1989: Return from the River Kwai
- 1989: The Neon Empire (TV movie)
- 1990: Face to Face (TV movie)
- 1991: F/X2
- 1993: The Beverly Hillbillies
- 1993: Danger Theatre (TV series)
- 1995: Two Billion Hearts (main theme music)
- 1995: Manhattan Merengue!
- 1996: Scorpion Spring
- 1997: Money Talks
- 1998: Rush Hour
- 1998: Something to Believe In
- 1998: Tango
- 2001: Culture Clash: West Meets East (video documentary short)
- 2001: Jackie Chan's Hong Kong Tour (video documentary short)
- 2001: Longshot
- 2001: Rush Hour 2
- 2002: Tom the Cat (short)
- 2003: Bringing Down the House
- 2004: After the Sunset
- 2004: Biyik (short)
- 2004: The Bridge of San Luis Rey
- 2006: Abominable
- 2007: Rush Hour 3
- 2007: Ultrasordine (short)
- 2008: Autour de 'Rush Hour 3' en 80 mots (video documentary)
- 2009: Mission Impossible (short)
- 2011: No Rest for the Wicked: A Basil & Moebius Adventure (short)
- 2011: Love Story
- 2013: Sweetwater
- 2015: Tales of Halloween (main title composer)

=== Television scores ===
- 1965: The Man from U.N.C.L.E.
- 1965: The Big Valley
- 1966: Blue Light
- 1966: T.H.E. Cat
- 1966: Mission: Impossible
- 1967: Mannix
- 1968: Braddock - Premiere (TV series)
- 1969: Medical Center
- 1974: Petrocelli
- 1974: Planet of the Apes
- 1975: Starsky and Hutch
- 1976: Most Wanted
- 1982: Chicago Story
- 1984: Glitter
- 1987: Sparky's Magic Piano
- 1988: Mission: Impossible (revival)

=== Video game scores ===
- 2004: Tom Clancy's Splinter Cell: Pandora Tomorrow (main theme only)
