= James Braddock =

James Braddock may refer to:

- James J. Braddock (1905–1974), American boxer
- James Braddock (cricketer) (1852–?), English cricketer
- Jamie Braddock, fictional character in Marvel Comics
- Colonel James Braddock, fictional character in the Missing in Action film franchise

== See also ==
- Braddock (surname)
- Braddock (disambiguation)
- James (disambiguation)
