= Braddick =

Braddick is a surname. Notable people with the surname include:

- Michael Braddick (born 1962), British historian and academic
- Oliver Braddick (1944–2022), British developmental psychologist
- Reg Braddick (1913–1999), Welsh racing cyclist

== See also ==
- Braddock (surname)
