= Perry Lopez =

American actor (1929–2008)

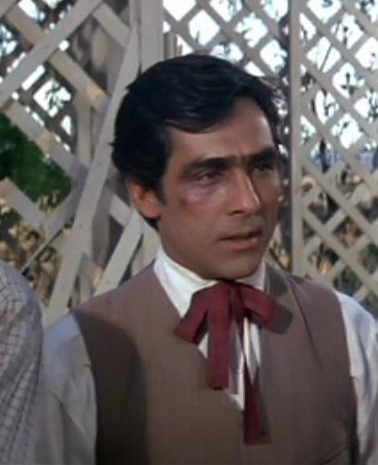
- Lopez in McLintock! (1963)
- Born: Julio César López; July 22, 1929; New York City, New York, U.S.
- Died: February 14, 2008 (aged 78); Beverly Grove, Los Angeles, California, U.S.
- Resting place: Hollywood Forever Cemetery
- Occupation: Actor
- Years active: 1954–1994
- Spouse: Claire Kelly (m. 1960; div. 1961)

Perry Lopez (born Julio César López; July 22, 1929 – February 14, 2008) was an American film and television actor. His acting career spanned 40 years.

== Biography ==
Lopez was born in New York City of Puerto Rican descent. Lopez began his acting career in theatre, based in New York.

He was signed to a contract at Warner Bros. Studios in 1954, his first credited appearance being Bogus Charlie in Drum Beat. Lopez appeared as Spanish Joe in Battle Cry (1955), as Rodrigues in Mister Roberts in 1955, then had the leading role in The Steel Jungle (1956) and appeared as Toro in Cry Tough in 1959. He also played in a number of B-movies and Westerns early on in his career, including the Creature from the Black Lagoon (1954), The Young Guns (1956) and The Lone Ranger.

Although he was part of the supporting cast in Mister Roberts, his role was prominent – he played opposite Henry Fonda and James Cagney, who were both established stars at the time. However, he was perhaps best known as Lieutenant Lou Escobar in the 1974 film Chinatown, which he appeared opposite Jack Nicholson and Faye Dunaway. He reprised the role sixteen years later (with Escobar promoted to Captain) in The Two Jakes in 1990. Also right before this time he starred opposite Charles Bronson playing drug gang leader Ed Zacharias in 1987's Death Wish 4: The Crackdown.

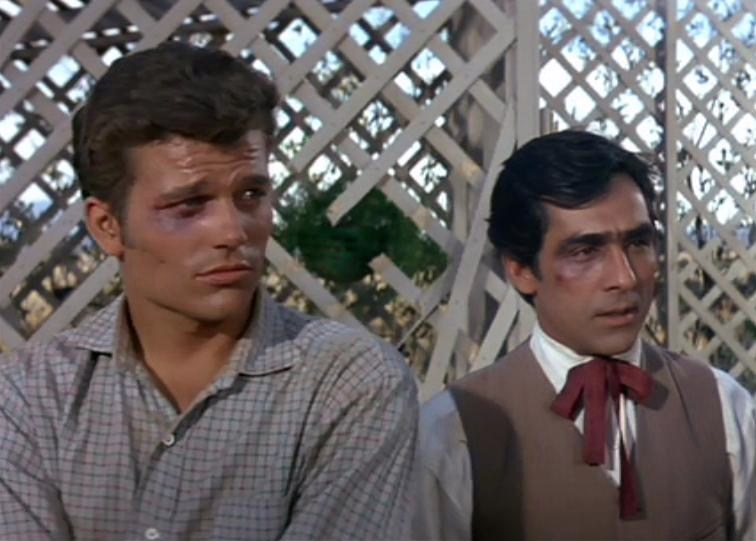
Lopez (right) with Patrick Wayne in McLintock! (1963)

Among his many television appearances, one of his more well-known roles is that of Esteban Rodriguez in the Star Trek episode "Shore Leave". Lopez also appeared in an episode of Bonanza as the cold-blooded outlaw Duke Miller, who kills a man over being first in line to get a haircut. He was Joaquín Castenada, a peon who fought to free his people, in four episodes of Zorro, starring Guy Williams. Lopez also appeared in episode 14, "Night of the Long Knives" originally airing December 16, 1966, of The Time Tunnel television series; in the Voyage to the Bottom of the Sea episode "Savage Jungle"; McLintock! (1963) as Davey Elk; in Juan Moreno's Body as a migrant Mexican fruit picker accused of murdering the son of the owner of the orchard; and in Kelly's Heroes (1970) as Private Petuko.

== Death ==
Lopez died of lung cancer at The Rehabilitation Centre of Beverly Hills in Beverly Grove, Los Angeles, at age 78. He was survived by several nieces and nephews. His ashes were interred at Hollywood Forever Cemetery.

== Filmography ==
- 1954 Jubilee Trail as Silva's Son (uncredited)
- 1954 Creature from the Black Lagoon as Tomas (uncredited)
- 1954 Drum Beat as Charley "Bogus Charley"
- 1955 Battle Cry as Private Joe "Spanish Joe" Gomez
- 1955 Mister Roberts as Rodrigues
- 1955 The McConnell Story as "Red" (uncredited)
- 1955 I Died a Thousand Times as Louis Mendoza
- 1956 Hell on Frisco Bay as Mario Amato
- 1956 The Lone Ranger as Pete Ramirez
- 1956 The Steel Jungle as Ed Novak
- 1956 The Young Guns as San Antone
- 1957 Omar Khayyam as Prince Ahmud
- 1958 Alfred Hitchcock Presents (Season 3 Episode 27: "Disappearing Trick") as Julio
- 1958 The Deep Six as Al Mendoza
- 1958 Violent Road as Manuelo
- 1958 The Rifleman as Manolo Argentez (S1E14) "The Gaucho"
- 1959 Cry Tough as Toro
- 1960 Flaming Star as Two Moons
- 1961 Man-Trap as Puerco
- 1962 Taras Bulba as Ostap Bulba
- 1962 Bonanza (Season 4 Episode 19: "The Last Haircut") as Duke Miller
- 1963 McLintock! as Davey Elk
- 1966 The Rare Breed as Juan
- 1966 Star Trek (Season 1; Episode 15, "Shore Leave") as Lieutenant Rodriguez
- 1968 Sol Madrid as Hood
- 1968 Daring Game as Reuben
- 1968 Bandolero! as Frisco
- 1969 Che! as Eliseo "Rolando" Reyes Rodriguez
- 1970 Kelly's Heroes as Private Petuko
- 1973 Lady Ice as Carlos
- 1974 Chinatown as Lieutenant Lou Escobar
- 1987 Death Wish 4: The Crackdown as Ed Zacharias
- 1989 Kinjite: Forbidden Subjects as Detective Eddie Rios
- 1990 The Two Jakes as Captain Lou Escobar
- 1994 Confessions of a Hitman as Priest (final film role)
