= Dizzy on the French Riviera =

Live album by Dizzy Gillespie
- Released: May 1962
- Recorded: 1962
- Genre: Jazz
- Length: 51:59
- Label: Philips
- Producer: Quincy Jones

Dizzy Gillespie chronology
Perceptions (1961)	Dizzy on the French Riviera (1962)	New Wave (1962)

Professional ratings
Review scores
Source	Rating
AllMusic	4/5 stars
DownBeat	4/5 stars
The Rolling Stone Album Guide	3/5 stars

Dizzy on the French Riviera is a 1962 live album by Dizzy Gillespie, arranged by Lalo Schifrin.

== Track listing ==
1. "No More Blues" (Antonio Carlos Jobim-Vinicius de Moraes) – 10:20
2. "Long, Long Summer" (Lalo Schifrin) – 5:15
3. "I Waited for You" (Gil Fuller, Dizzy Gillespie) – 2:44
4. "Desafinado" (Jobim-Mendonça) – 3:27
5. "Here It Is" (Gillespie) – 8:33
6. "Pau de Arara" (Schifrin arrangement of the original Brazilian folk song by Luiz Gonzaga & Guio de Morais) – 3:38
7. "For the Gypsies" (Gillespie) – 4:34

== Personnel ==
=== Performance ===
- Lalo Schifrin – piano
- Dizzy Gillespie – trumpet, vocals
- Leo Wright - flute, alto saxophone, vocals
- Elek Bacsik - guitar
- Chris White (bassist) - double bass
- Rudy Collins - drums
- Pepito Riestria - percussion
- Charlie Ventura - tenor saxophone, bass saxophone
