= An Electrifying Evening with the Dizzy Gillespie Quintet =

Live album by Dizzy Gillespie
- Released: 1961
- Recorded: February 9, 1961
- Venue: Museum of Modern Art, NYC
- Genre: Jazz
- Length: 54:41
- Label: Verve
- Producer: Charles Shwartz

Dizzy Gillespie chronology
Gillespiana (1960)	An Electrifying Evening with the Dizzy Gillespie Quintet (1961)	Carnegie Hall Concert (1961)

Professional ratings
Review scores
Source	Rating
AllMusic	5/5 stars
DownBeat	4.5/5 stars
The Penguin Guide to Jazz Recordings	3/4 stars
The Rolling Stone Jazz Record Guide	5/5 stars

An Electrifying Evening with the Dizzy Gillespie Quintet is a 1961 live album by trumpeter Dizzy Gillespie, recorded at the Museum of Modern Art in New York City.

== Track listing ==
Side A
No.	Title	Writer(s)	Length
1.	"Kush"	Dizzy Gillespie	11:01
2.	"Salt Peanuts"	Kenny Clarke, Gillespie	7:08

Side B
No.	Title	Writer(s)	Length
1.	"A Night in Tunisia"	Gillespie, Frank Paparelli	6:46
2.	"The Mooche"	Duke Ellington, Irving Mills	11:43
Total length:			36:38

CD reissue bonus track
No.	Title	Length
5.	"Interview with Dizzy Gillespie by Charles Shwartz"	18:03
Total length:		54:41

== Personnel ==
- Dizzy Gillespie – trumpet
- Leo Wright – alto saxophone, flute
- Lalo Schifrin – piano
- Bob Cunningham – bass
- Chuck Lampkin – drums
- Candido Camero – conga
