= Leo Wright =

American jazz musician

- Born: December 14, 1933; Wichita Falls, Texas, United States
- Died: January 4, 1991 (aged 57) Vienna, Austria
- Genres: Jazz
- Occupation: Musician
- Instruments: Alto saxophone, flute, clarinet

Leo Wright (December 14, 1933 in Wichita Falls, Texas – January 4, 1991 in Vienna) was an American jazz musician who played alto saxophone, flute and clarinet. He played with Booker Ervin, Charles Mingus, John Hardee, Kenny Burrell, Johnny Coles, Blue Mitchell and Dizzy Gillespie in the late 1950s, early 1960s and in the late 1970s. Relocating to Europe in 1963, Wright settled in Berlin and later Vienna. During this time he performed and recorded primarily in Europe, using European musicians or fellow American expatriates, such as Kenny Clarke and Art Farmer. He died of a heart attack in 1991 at the age of 57.

== Discography ==
=== As leader/co-leader ===
- Blues Shout (Atlantic, 1960)
- Suddenly the Blues (Atlantic, 1961)
- Soul Talk (Vortex, 1963)
- Modern Jazz Studio Number 4 (Amiga, 1965 [1970])
- Flute + Alto – Sax (Amiga, 1965 [1967])
- Alto Summit (MPS, 1968) with Lee Konitz, Pony Poindexter and Phil Woods
- It's All Wright (MPS, 1972)
- Evening Breeze (Roulette, 1977)
- New Horn in Town/Blues Shote (Fresh Sound, 2012)

=== As sideman ===
With Booker Ervin

- Doug's Night Club, Berlin, Germany (Bootleg), 1965)

With Kenny Burrell

- Bluesin' Around (Columbia, 1962 [1983])

With Gloria Coleman

- Soul Sisters (Impulse!, 1963)

With Johnny Coles

- Little Johnny C (Blue Note, 1963)

With Tadd Dameron

- The Magic Touch (Riverside, 1962)

With Red Garland

- I Left My Heart... (Muse, 1978 [1985])

With Dizzy Gillespie

- Copenhagen Concert (SteepleChase)
- Gillespiana (Verve, 1960)
- An Electrifying Evening with the Dizzy Gillespie Quintet (Verve, 1961)
- Carnegie Hall Concert (Verve, 1961)
- Dizzy on the French Riviera (Philips, 1962)
- A Musical Safari – Live at the Monterey Jazz Festival 1961 (Booman, 1974)
- New Wave (Philips, 1963)

With Gildo Mahones

- I'm Shooting High (Prestige, 1963)
- The Great Gildo (Prestige, 1964)

With Jack McDuff

- Screamin' (Prestige, 1962)

With Blue Mitchell

- Step Lightly (Blue Note, 1964)

With Oliver Nelson

- Berlin Dialogue for Orchestra (Flying Dutchman, 1970)

With Dave Pike

- Limbo Carnival (New Jazz, 1962)

With Lalo Schifrin

- Lalo = Brilliance (Roulette, 1962)
- Bossa Nova: New Brazilian Jazz (Audio Fidelity, 1962)
- Samba Para Dos with Bob Brookmeyer (Verve, 1963)

With Richard Williams

- New Horn in Town (Candid, 1960)

With Jimmy Witherspoon

- Baby, Baby, Baby (Prestige, 1963)

With Antônio Carlos Jobim

- The Composer of Desafinado Plays (Verve, 1963)
