= Carnegie Hall Concert (Dizzy Gillespie album) =

Live album by Dizzy Gillespie
- Released: 1961
- Recorded: March 4, 1961; Carnegie Hall, New York City
- Genre: Jazz
- Length: 33:19
- Label: Verve; V 8423
- Producer: Norman Granz

Dizzy Gillespie chronology
An Electrifying Evening with the Dizzy Gillespie Quintet (1961)	Carnegie Hall Concert (1961)	Perceptions (1961)

Professional ratings
Review scores
Source	Rating
AllMusic	3/5 stars
DownBeat	4.5/5 stars

Carnegie Hall Concert is an album by trumpeter Dizzy Gillespie recorded in 1961 at Carnegie Hall, New York City and released on the Verve label.

== Track listing ==
All compositions by Dizzy Gillespie except as indicated

1. "Manteca" (Gillespie, Gil Fuller, Chano Pozo) - 6:22
2. "This Is the Way" - 4:00
3. "Ool-Ya-Koo" (Gillespie, Fuller) - 5:35
4. "Kush" - 4:12
5. "Tunisian Fantasy" (Gillespie, Frank Paparelli) - 13:10

== Personnel ==
- Dizzy Gillespie - trumpet, vocal
- John Frosk, Clark Terry, Carl Warwick, Nick Travis - trumpet
- George Matthews, Arnett Sparrow, Britt Woodman, Paul Faulise - trombone
- Gunther Schuller, Jimmy Buffington, John Barrows, Richard Berg - French horn
- Don Butterfield - tuba
- Leo Wright - alto saxophone, flute
- Lalo Schifrin - piano, arranger
- Art Davis - bass
- Chuck Lampkin - drums
- Ray Barretto, Julio Colazo, Jose Mangual - percussion
- Joe Carroll - vocal (track 3)
