= Suddenly the Blues =

Studio album by Leo Wright
- Released: 1962
- Recorded: April 23, 1962; NYC
- Genre: Jazz
- Length: 34:33
- Label: Atlantic; SD 1393
- Producer: Nesuhi Ertegun

Leo Wright chronology
Blues Shout (1960)	Suddenly the Blues (1962)	Soul Talk (1963)

Suddenly the Blues is an album by saxophonist Leo Wright featuring performances recorded in 1962 for the Atlantic label.

== Reception ==
Professional ratings
Review scores
Source	Rating
AllMusic	3/5 stars
The Penguin Guide to Jazz Recordings	3/4 stars

AllMusic reviewer, David Szatmary, stated it was "More driving than Blues Shout", Wright's previous album.

== Track listing ==
All compositions by Leo Wright, except as indicated

1. "A Felicidad" (Antonio Carlos Jobim) - 2:37
2. "Greensleeves (Traditional) - 2:45
3. "Gensel's Message" - 4:10
4. "The Wiggler" - 2:55
5. "Tali" (Tom McIntosh) - 4:44
6. "Dionysos" (Lalo Schifrin) - 3:07
7. "Sassy Lady" (McIntosh) - 4:24
8. "Willow Weep for Me" (Ann Ronell) - 4:21
9. "Suddenly the Blues" - 5:07

== Personnel ==
- Leo Wright - alto saxophone, flute
- Kenny Burrell - guitar
- Ron Carter - bass
- Rudy Collins - drums
