= Gillespiana In Cologne =

Live album by Lalo Schifrin
- Released: September 4, 1998
- Recorded: November 30, 1996; Cologne Philharmonic Hall, Germany
- Genre: Jazz & 20th-century classical music
- Length: 1:01:58
- Label: Aleph Records; ALEPH 002
- Producer: Lalo Schifrin; Wolfgang Hirschmann

Lalo Schifrin chronology
Music from Mission: Impossible (1996)	Gillespiana In Cologne (1998)	"Che!" (music from the film Che!) (1998)

Professional ratings
Review scores
Source	Rating
All About Jazz	Recommended
Allmusic	4/5 stars
All About Jazz	Recommended

Gillespiana In Cologne is a live album by Argentine-American composer, pianist and conductor Lalo Schifrin with soloists and the WDR Big Band recorded in-concert in Cologne, Germany in 1996. The concert was also broadcast on German radio and television. The album was released to inaugurate Schifrin's Aleph Records label in 1998. It was the first recording of Gillespiana, Schifrin's classic jazz suite, since the debut recording by Dizzy Gillespie and his orchestra in 1960.

== Playlist ==
Source =

- Gillespiana Suite (Lalo Schifrin)
1. Prelude (7:08)
2. Blues (12:09)
3. Panamericana (5:26)
4. Africana (13:56)
5. Tocata (14:33)
- Bachianas Brasileiras No. 5 (Heitor Villa-Lobos, arranged by Schifrin) (8:46)

== Personnel ==
Source =

- Lalo Schifrin – piano, composer, arranger, conductor, album producer
- Jon Faddis – trumpet soloist
- Markus Stockhausen– trumpet soloist (from WDR Big Band)
- Paquito D'Rivera - alto sax soloist
- Heiner Wiberny – alto sax & flute soloist (from WDR Big Band)
- John Riley – drums (from WDR Big Band)
- Alex Acuña – Latin percussion
- Marcio Doctor – Latin percussion

—Production—

- Wolfgang Hirschmann – producer, recording & mixing engineer
- Reinhold Nickel – recording & mixing engineer
- Ruth Witt – digital editing
- Bobby Bee – mastering engineer
- WDR Big Band
  - Andy Haderer, Rob Bruynen, Klaus Osterloh, John Marshall – trumpet
  - Dave Horler, Ludwig Nuss, Bernt Laukamp – trombone
  - Dietmar Florin – bass trombone
  - Harald Rosenstein – alto sax
  - Olivier Peters, Rolf Romer – tenor sax
  - Jens Neufang – baritone sax
  - Milan Lulic – guitar
  - John Goldsby – bass
- Guest performers with WDR Big Band
  - Andrew Joy, Charles Putnam, Kathleen Putnam, Mark Putnam – French horn
  - Ed Partyka – tuba

== See also ==
- Westdeutscher Rundfunk (WDR)
