= Pola Roberts =

American drummer

- Birth name: Paula Roberts
- Born: 1938 (age 86–87); Pittsburgh (Hill), Pennsylvania, U.S.
- Genres: Jazz
- Occupation: Musician
- Instrument(s): Drums, percussion
- Labels: Impulse

Paula 'Pola' Roberts (1938) is an American jazz drummer. Roberts is an autodidact who started on the bongo and finally started playing drums on her 17th.

Gloria Coleman, a female band leader, organist and spouse of George Coleman, discovered Roberts and hired her to play in her band that consisted entirely of women. In 1963, organist Gloria Coleman regularly played with her in a quartet in a bar (Branker's) in upper Harlem. The presence of two female musicians in a small group also gave the title to the album Soul Sisters (Impulse). Later she moved to New York and played with Art Blakey, Stanley Turrentine, Max Roach, George Benson and Jack McDuff.

== Discography ==
=== As sidewoman ===
- Soul Sisters (Impulse!, 1963) with Gloria Coleman.
