= The Steel Jungle =

1956 film by Walter Doniger

The Steel Jungle (1956 film)
- Theatrical release poster
- Directed by: Walter Doniger
- Written by: Walter Doniger
- Produced by: David Weisbart
- Starring: Perry Lopez; Beverly Garland; Walter Abel
- Cinematography: J. Peverell Marley
- Edited by: Folmar Blangsted
- Music by: David Buttolph
- Production company: Warner Bros. Pictures
- Distributed by: Warner Bros. Pictures
- Release date: March 10, 1956 (United States)
- Running time: 86 minutes
- Country: United States
- Language: English

The Steel Jungle is a 1956 American film noir crime drama directed by Walter Doniger and starring Perry Lopez, Beverly Garland, and Walter Abel. The film was directed and written by Walter Doniger. Produced independently, the film was distributed by Warner Bros. Pictures, and theatrically released in the United States on March 10, 1956.

== Plot ==
Ed Novak (Perry Lopez), a two-bit bookie, goes to prison rather than squeal on his Syndicate higher-ups. Novak's silence exacts a toll on his wife Frances (Beverly Garland), who is expecting a child. The longer Novak remains in prison, the more he becomes aware that the mob has deserted him — and the more he's willing to spill what he knows. Fellow prisoner Steve Marlin (Ted de Corsia) intends to see that Novak keeps his mouth shut permanently.

== Cast ==
- Perry Lopez as Ed Novak
- Beverly Garland as Frances Novak
- Walter Abel as Warden Bill Keller
- Ted de Corsia as Steve Marlin
- Leo Gordon as Lupo
- Kenneth Tobey as Psychiatrist Lewy
- Bob Steele as Dan Bucci
- Allison Hayes as Mrs. Archer
- Lyle Latell as Bailiff
- Joe Flynn as Marlin's Henchman (uncredited)

== See also ==
- List of American films of 1956
- Bob Steele filmography
