= Blues Shout =

Studio album by Leo Wright
- Released: 1960
- Recorded: May 25 and August 29, 1960; NYC
- Genre: Jazz
- Length: 40:33
- Label: Atlantic; SD 1358
- Producer: Nesuhi Ertegun

Leo Wright chronology
Blues Shout (1960)	Suddenly the Blues (1961)

Blues Shout is an album by saxophonist Leo Wright featuring performances recorded in 1960 for the Atlantic label.

== Reception ==
Professional ratings
Review scores
Source	Rating
AllMusic	4.5/5 stars

AllMusic reviewer Jason Ankeney stated: "Wright divides his attention between his signature alto sax and flute, delivering a series of thoughtful and lyrical solos that positively radiate energy. The blues referenced in the title are more a feeling than a sound, underscoring the emotional intensity that bristles below the surface of every note".

== Track listing ==
All compositions by Leo Wright, except as indicated

1. "Sigi" - 3:23
2. "Angel Eyes" (Matt Dennis, Earl Brent) - 5:08
3. "Autumn Leaves" (Joseph Kosma, Jacques Prévert, Johnny Mercer) - 3:45
4. "Indian Summer" (Victor Herbert, Al Dubin) - 7:00
5. "Blues Shout" (Gigi Gryce) - 4:56
6. "A Night in Tunisia" (Dizzy Gillespie, Frank Paparelli) - 5:19
7. "The Wind" (Russ Freeman, Jerry Gladstone) - 4:38
8. "Two Moods" - 5:48

== Personnel ==
- Leo Wright - alto saxophone, flute
- Richard Williams - trumpet (tracks 5–8)
- Harry Lookofsky - violin (tracks 1–4)
- Junior Mance - piano
- Art Davis - bass
- Charlie Persip - drums
