= Rod Schejtman =

Argentine composer

- Born: Rod Schejtman; Argentina
- Origin: Argentina
- Genres: Classical, cinematic music
- Occupations: Composer, pianist, educator
- Instrument: Piano
- Years active: 2000–present
- Website: Official website

Maestro Rod Schejtman is an Argentine–American symphonic composer, pianist, engineer, and educator. He is the founder of The Piano Encyclopedia, known for developing a methodology to teach improvisation, composition, and ear training, and for integrating classical symphonic forms with cinematic language.

== Career ==
In 2005, Schejtman launched The Piano Encyclopedia, establishing a global digital platform for piano education and introducing The Logic Behind Music, a system designed to dismantle the myth of innate talent and enable any student to improvise, compose, and play by ear through logical analysis rather than memorization. The methodology has reached over 250,000 students in 75 countries.

In 2023, after a two-year selection process involving 32 countries and more than 60 institutions—including Steinway & Sons, Bechstein, and the New York Philharmonic—Schejtman was awarded the title of global laureate at the WorldVision Composers Contest in Vienna. This event is widely referred to as the "World Cup of Classical Music". During the competition, he composed three full-scale symphonic works, and his piece Luce Nell'Oscurità was broadcast nationally in Argentina by Radio Nacional after the Vienna ceremony. The event and his award received coverage in major media outlets.

Schejtman has performed internationally, including at the Musilosophy Festival in Rome and Plaça Catalunya in Barcelona. His works have been presented on Radio FM 104.5 and Antena 3 TV, and in concerts for diplomatic audiences.

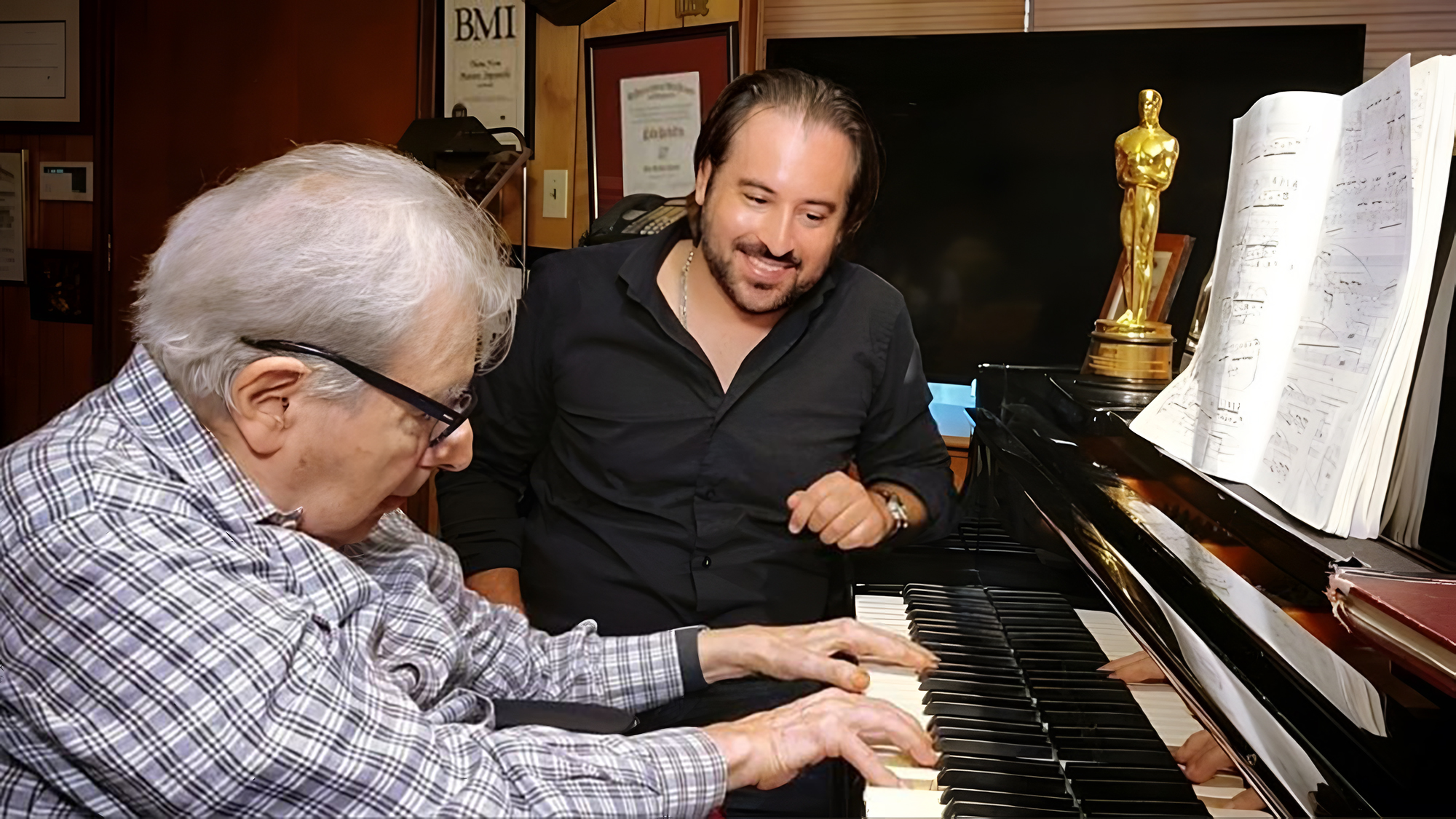
Los Angeles, early 2024. Lalo Schifrin and Maestro Rod Schejtman in the Beverly Hills studio where Schifrin composed Mission: Impossible, working together on Long Live Freedom (Viva la Libertad), their latest jointly composed symphony.

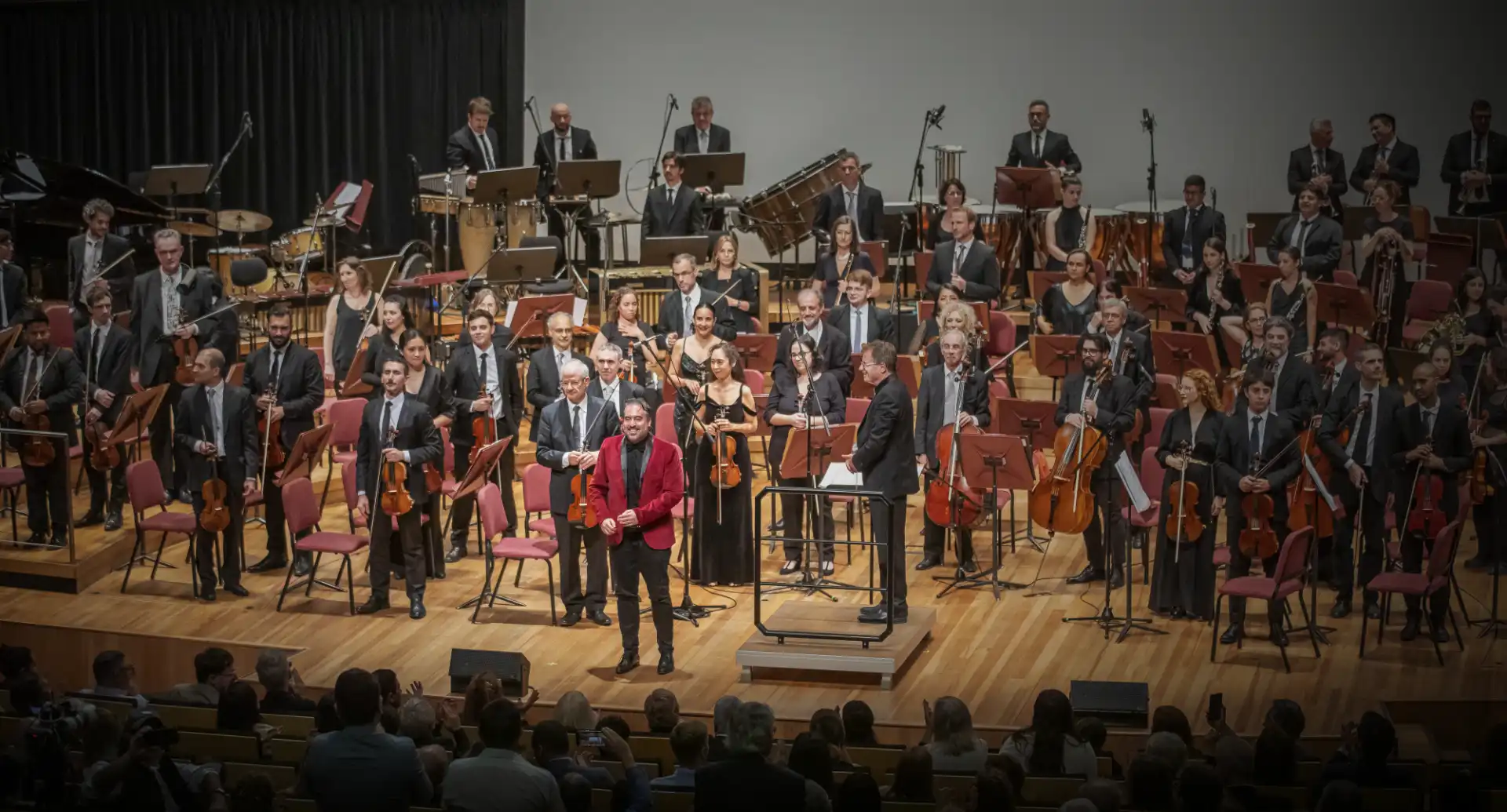
Palacio Libertad. World premiere of the symphony Long Live Freedom (Viva la Libertad) by Schifrin-Schejtman, performed by one hundred musicians of the National Symphony Orchestra and presented by Maestro Rod Schejtman before two thousand spectators.

In 2024, Schejtman was selected by Lalo Schifrin—composer of the Mission: Impossible theme, six-time Grammy Award winner, and Honorary Oscar recipient—to co-author Long Live Freedom (Viva la Libertad), a full-length symphony dedicated to Argentina. The premiere took place in Buenos Aires, performed by the National Symphony Orchestra under Emmanuel Siffert. The work was broadcast nationwide by Public Television and Radio Nacional. Long Live Freedom was subsequently declared a Work of Cultural Interest by the Government of Argentina. The work and its message have been widely covered by national and international press. The world tour of Long Live Freedom includes performances in Los Angeles, Paris, and other capitals. The concert program features selections from Lalo Schifrin's legendary film scores—including Mission: Impossible— alongside Maestro Rod Schejtman's award-winning symphonic works from the Vienna WorldVision Composers Contest.

In 2025, Schejtman was named Corresponding Member of the Bach Society, becoming the first Argentine to receive this distinction since the Society's founding in 1917. The board cited his "outstanding qualities as a pianist, composer, and musician," and recognized him as "a key figure in contemporary classical music."

== Awards ==
- WorldVision Composers Contest – Global Laureate / World Champion (Vienna, 2023)
- Work of Cultural Interest, Government of Argentina (2025)
- Corresponding Member, Bach Society (2025)
