= The Cincinnati Kid (soundtrack) =

The Cincinnati Kid (Soundtrack)

Soundtrack album by Lalo Schifrin
- Released: 1965
- Recorded: July 15 and 16, 1965; July 22, 1965
- Studio: MGM Scoring Stage (Culver City, California); RCA (Hollywood, California)
- Genre: Film score
- Length: 33:11
- Label: MGM SE-4313
- Producer: Jesse Kaye

Lalo Schifrin chronology
Once a Thief and Other Themes (1965)	The Cincinnati Kid (Soundtrack) (1965)	Murderer's Row (1966)

Ray Charles chronology
Country and Western Meets Rhythm and Blues (1965)	The Cincinnati Kid (1965)	Crying Time (1966)

The Cincinnati Kid is a 1965 soundtrack album to the film The Cincinnati Kid, starring Steve McQueen. It features "The Cincinnati Kid", as sung by Ray Charles, which can be heard near the end of the film. The rest of the album contains film music composed by Lalo Schifrin.

Professional ratings
Review scores
Source	Rating
Allmusic	3/5 stars

== Track listing ==
All music is composed by Lalo Schifrin except as indicated.

Side One
No.	Title	Length
1.	"The Cincinnati Kid"	2:17
2.	"So Many Times"	2:02
3.	"New Orleans procession"	3:14
4.	"Shooter"	3:18
5.	"The Man"	2:35
6.	"The Cock Fight"	1:35

Side Two
No.	Title	Length
7.	"The Cincinnati Kid" (Instrumental)	2:55
8.	"Melba"	3:59
9.	"Dialogue In The Rain"	2:59
10.	"The Chase"	1:40
11.	"All Packed"	1:20
12.	"The Game"	2:00
13.	"At The Farm"	3:17
Total length:		33:11

== Personnel ==
- Composer, arranger: Lalo Schifrin
- Conductor: Robert Armbruster
- Vocals: Ray Charles (track 1)
- Violin: Sam Freed, David Frisina, Nathan Kaproff, Anatol Kaminsky, George Kast, Jacob Krachmalnick, Alexander Murray, Erno Neufeld
- Viola: Myra Kestenbaum, Virginia Majewski, Robert Ostrowsky
- Cello: Edgar Lustgarten, Eleanor Slatkin
- Double Bass: Keith Mitchell
- Guitar: Al Hendrickson, Tommy Tedesco
- Trumpet: Al Porcino
- Trombone: Milt Bernhart
- Tuba: John Kitzmiller
- Saxophone: Bill Holman
- Clarinet: Justin Gordon
- Drums: Stanley Levey, Victor Feldman
- Harmonica: Tommy Morgan
