= The Dissection and Reconstruction of Music from the Past as Performed by the Inmates of Lalo Schifrin's Demented Ensemble as a Tribute to the Memory of the Marquis De Sade =

The Dissection and Reconstruction of Music From the Past as Performed by the Inmates of Lalo Schifrin's Demented Ensemble as a Tribute to the Memory of the Marquis De Sade

Studio album by Lalo Schifrin
- Released: 1 June 1966
- Recorded: April 27 & 28, 1966
- Studio: Van Gelder Studio, Englewood Cliffs, NJ
- Genre: Jazz
- Length: 32:31
- Label: Verve
- Producer: Creed Taylor

Lalo Schifrin chronology
Murderers' Row (1966)	The Dissection and Reconstruction of Music From the Past as Performed by the Inmates of Lalo Schifrin's Demented Ensemble as a Tribute to the Memory of the Marquis De Sade (1966)	Cool Hand Luke (1966)

The Dissection and Reconstruction of Music From the Past as Performed by the Inmates of Lalo Schifrin's Demented Ensemble as a Tribute to the Memory of the Marquis De Sade is a 1966 studio album by Lalo Schifrin.

== Reception ==
The AllMusic review by Richard S. Ginell awarded the album three stars and said that "This crackpot title...is a front for a not-so-dangerous, hard-swinging album in which Schifrin invents or borrows 18th-century classical themes and sets them into big band or small-combo contexts. With the cream of New York's jazz session men of the '60s on board...jazz buffs will have a fine time with this collision of the centuries, which leans heavily to the jazz side". In his review of the album's sequel AllMusic's John Bush noted that,"... the LP practically disappeared upon release... but enjoyed a long shelf life among idiosyncratic jazz fans..."; so much so that the sequel was released 35 years after the original.

Professional ratings
Review scores
Source	Rating
AllMusic	3/5 stars

== Track listing ==
All compositions by Lalo Schifrin

1. "Old Laces" – 4:23
2. "The Wig" – 2:44
3. "The Blues for Johann Sebastian" – 3:38
4. "Renaissance" – 3:29
5. "Beneath a Weeping Willow Shade" – 2:33
6. "Versailles Promenade" – 4:04
7. "Troubadour" – 3:07
8. "Marquis de Sade" – 2:50
9. "Aria" – 2:36
10. "Bossa Antique" – 3:29

== Personnel ==
- Lalo Schifrin – arranger, conductor, harpsichord, piano
- Jerome Richardson – alto flute, bass flute, tenor saxophone
- Romeo Penque – alto flute, tenor saxophone
- Jimmy Maxwell, Ernie Royal, Clark Terry, Snooky Young – trumpet
- Ray Alonge, Richard Berg, James Buffington – French horn
- Urbie Green, J.J. Johnson, Kai Winding – trombone
- Tommy Mitchell – bass trombone
- Don Butterfield – tuba
- Gene Bertoncini – classical guitar, electric guitar
- Gloria Agostini – harp
- Harry Lookofsky, Gene Orloff, Christopher Williams- violin
- Alfred Brown – viola, violin
- George Ricci – cello
- Richard Davis – double bass
- Grady Tate – drums
- Rose Marie Jun – vocals

Production

- Creed Taylor – producer
- Rudy Van Gelder – recording engineer
- Val Valentin – director of engineering
- Acy Lehman – cover design
- Paul De Barros – liner notes
