= Chatter Jazz =

Studio album by Rex Stewart and Dicky Wells
- Released: 1959
- Recorded: January 20, 21 & 22, 1959
- Studio: Studio B, RCA Victor Studios, NYC
- Genre: Jazz
- Length: 30:26
- Label: RCA Victor; LPM/LSP 2024
- Producer: George T. Simon

Rex Stewart chronology
Porgy & Bess Revisited (1959)	Chatter Jazz (1959)	The Happy Jazz of Rex Stewart (1959)

Dicky Wells chronology
Bones for the King (1958)	Chatter Jazz (1959)	Trombone Four-in-Hand (1959)

Chatter Jazz subtitled The Talkative Horns of Rex Stewart and Dickie Wells, is an album by cornetist Rex Stewart and trombonist Dicky Wells which was recorded in 1959 and released on the RCA Victor label.

== Reception ==
Professional ratings
Review scores
Source	Rating
AllMusic	3.5/5 stars

Ken Dryden of AllMusic states, "the two horn players exchange ideas through a series of "conversations" utilizing various mutes, never going for very long without giving time to the other. These friendly studio dates are somewhat low-key but consistently swinging; the only drawback is that the tracks are rather brief, with only two of the 12 songs exceeding three minutes". The Rough Guide to Jazz said "Both Dicky Wells and Stewart were masters of sound as well as possessing rich senses of musical humor, and this is what this album is about. They converse amicably and spiritedly on suitable selections ... A few tracks at a time may be the best way".

== Track listing ==
1. "Little Sir Echo" (John Sylvester Fearis, Laura Rountree Smith) – 2:30
2. "Together" (Ray Henderson, Buddy DeSylva, Lew Brown) – 2:11
3. "Let's Call the Whole Thing Off" (George Gershwin, Ira Gershwin) – 2:20
4. "Gimme a Little Kiss, Will Ya, Huh?" (Maceo Pinkard, Roy Turk, Jack Smith) – 2:11
5. "Show Me the Way to Go Home" (Irving King) – 3:04
6. "Frankie and Johnny" (Traditional) – 2:17
7. "Let's Do It" (Cole Porter) – 2:50
8. "I May Be Wrong (but I Think You're Wonderful)" (Henry Sullivan, Harry Ruskin) – 3:07
9. "Thou Swell" (Richard Rodgers, Lorenz Hart) – 2:02
10. "Side by Side" (Harry M. Woods) – 2:40
11. "Ain't We Got Fun" (Richard A. Whiting, Raymond B. Egan, Gus Kahn) – 2:47
12. "Jeepers Creepers" (Harry Warren, Johnny Mercer) – 2:27

== Personnel ==
- Rex Stewart – cornet
- Dickie Wells – trombone
- John Bunch – piano
- Leonard Gaskin – bass
- Charlie Masterpaolo – drums
