= Braddock Road =

Braddock Road has the following meanings:

- Braddock Road (Braddock expedition), the road in Maryland and Pennsylvania laid out by the Braddock expedition, including:
  - Maryland Route 49, a state highway in Allegany County, Maryland
- Braddock Road (Northern Virginia), signed as State Route 620
  - Braddock Road (Washington Metro), a subway station in Alexandria, Virginia

== See also ==
- Braddock (disambiguation)
