= Lalo = Brilliance =

Studio album by Lalo Schifrin
- Released: 1962
- Recorded: 1962; New York City
- Genre: Jazz
- Length: 32:01
- Label: Roulette; SR 52088
- Producer: Teddy Reig

Lalo Schifrin chronology
Piano Español (1959)	Lalo = Brilliance (1962)	Bossa Nova: New Brazilian Jazz (1962)

Professional ratings
Review scores
Source	Rating
Down Beat	3/5 stars
Allmusic	3/5 stars

Lalo = Brilliance (subtitled The Piano of Lalo Schifrin) is an album by Argentine composer, pianist and conductor Lalo Schifrin recorded in 1962 and released on the Roulette label. The album was one of Schifrin's earliest solo albums and features musicians from Dizzy Gillespie's band.

== Track listing ==
All compositions by Lalo Schifrin except as indicated

1. "The Snake's Dance" - 3:27
2. "An Evening in Sao Paulo" - 2:44
3. "Desafinado" (Antonio Carlos Jobim) - 3:17
4. "Kush" (Dizzy Gillespie) - 6:13
5. "Rhythm-A-Ning" (Thelonious Monk) - 4:32
6. "Mount Olive" - 4:38
7. "Cubano Be" (George Russell) - 3:10
8. "Sphayros" 4:00
- Recorded in New York City in 1962

== Personnel ==
- Lalo Schifrin - piano, arranger
- Leo Wright - alto saxophone, flute
- Jimmy Raney - guitar
- Art Davis - bass
- Rudy Collins - drums
- Willie Rodriguez - conga, bongos
