= Metamorphosis: Jazz Meets the Symphony =

Metamorphosis: Jazz Meets the Symphony #4

Studio album by Lalo Schifrin
- Released: 1998
- Recorded: April 1998; Los Angeles and London
- Genre: Jazz
- Length: 59:57
- Label: Aleph; 004
- Producer: Lalo Schifrin

Lalo Schifrin chronology
Jazz Mass in Concert (1998)	Metamorphosis: Jazz Meets the Symphony #4 (1998)	Mannix (1999)

Metamorphosis: Jazz Meets the Symphony #4 is an album by Argentine composer, pianist and conductor Lalo Schifrin with bassist Ray Brown, drummer Jeff Hamilton, trumpeter James Morrison, percussionist Francisco Aguabella and the London Symphony Orchestra recorded in 1998 and released on Schifrin's Aleph label.

== Reception ==
The Allmusic review stated "Lalo Schifrin's fourth attempt to merge symphonic and jazz conceptions takes a turn into dangerous waters, venturing into 20th century classical techniques and some of jazz's most challenging composers... Though one shouldn't use this disc as an entryway into the Jazz Meets the Symphony series, it is the boldest CD of the lot so far, unleashing the full resources of contemporary classical music and welding it firmly onto a jazz chassis".

Professional ratings
Review scores
Source	Rating
Allmusic	4.5/5 stars

== Track listing ==
All compositions by Lalo Schifrin except as indicated

1. "La Nevada" (Gil Evans) - 6:20
2. "Sanctuary" - 6:17
3. "Tosca Variations" (Giacomo Puccini) - 3:54
4. "Miraculous Monk: Evidence/Epistrophy/Four in One/Criss Cross/Straight, No Chaser/Well, You Needn't/Misterioso/'Round Midnight/Rhythm-A-Ning" (Thelonious Monk) - 13:48
5. "Invisible City" - 5:51
6. "Rhapsody for Bix: Davenport Blues/Royal Garden Blues/Singing the Blues/In a Mist/Rhapsody for Bix Theme/At the Jazz Band Ball/Jazz-Me Blues" (Bix Beiderbecke/Clarence Williams, Spencer Williams/Sam M. Lewis, Joe Young, Con Conrad, J. Russel Robinson/Beiderbecke/Schifrin/Beiderbecke/Tom Delaney) - 23:47

== Personnel ==
- Lalo Schifrin - piano, arranger, conductor
- James Morrison - flugelhorn, trumpet
- Markus Wienstroer - violin, guitar
- Ray Brown - bass
- Jeff Hamilton drums
- Francisco Aguabella - congas
- London Symphony Orchestra
