= Invocation: Jazz Meets the Symphony No. 7 =

Studio album by Lalo Schifrin

Studio album by Lalo Schifrin
- Released: April 12, 2011
- Recorded: July, 2010; Prague, Czech Republic
- Genre: Jazz & 21st-century classical music
- Length: 1:07:17
- Label: Aleph Records; ALEPH 045
- Producer: Lalo Schifrin; Donna Schifrin, executive producer

Lalo Schifrin chronology
Mission: Impossible and Other Thrilling Themes (2008)	Invocation: Jazz Meets the Symphony No. 7 (2011)	Lalo Schifrin–The Early Years (2018)

Professional ratings
Review scores
Source	Rating
Allmusic	3.5/5 stars
All About Jazz	♥ Recommended

Invocation: Jazz Meets the Symphony No. 7 is an album by Argentine-American composer, pianist, and conductor Lalo Schifrin with a jazz quartet and the Czech National Symphony Orchestra recorded in Prague, Czech Republic in 2010 and released on the Aleph label in 2011. The album was the seventh in Schifrin's highly acclaimed "Jazz Meets the Symphony" series. Unlike some others in the series, the album was not recorded before a live audience.

== Playlist ==
Source =

1. Trombone Fantasy (Lalo Schifrin) 8:59
2. Groovin’ High (Dizzy Gillespie, arranged by Schifrin) 9:26
3. Invocations (Lalo Schifrin) 9:13
4. Summer Dance (Lalo Schifrin) 6:28
5. Reverie (Claude Debussy, arranged by Schifrin) 5:28
6. Etude In Rhythm (Lalo Schifrin) 15:57
7. Here ‘Tis (Dizzy Gillespie, arranged by Schifrin) 11:48

== Personnel ==
Performers:-

- Czech National Symphony Orchestra
- Lalo Schifrin – piano, arranger, composer, conductor, album producer
- Kryštof Marek – conductor
- James Morrison – trumpet, fluegelhorn, piccolo trumpet, and trombone
- Pierre Boussaguet – bass
- Tom Gordon – drums.

Production:-

- Donna Schifrin – executive producer
- Jan Kotzmann – recording engineer
- Cenda Kotzmann, Standa Baroch, Sylva Smejkalova – assistant engineers
- Gustavo Borner – digital editing, mixing & mastering engineer
- Theresa Eastman Schifrin – art direction, album design
- Barbara Chase & Martin Maly – photography
- Richard Palmer – liner notes
