= Bossa Nova: New Brazilian Jazz =

Studio album by Lalo Schifrin
- Released: 1962
- Recorded: June 1962; New York City
- Genre: Jazz
- Labels: Audio Fidelity; AFSD 5981

Lalo Schifrin chronology
Lalo = Brilliance (1962)	Bossa Nova: New Brazilian Jazz (1962)	Piano, Strings and Bossa Nova (1962)

Professional ratings
Review scores
Source	Rating
Down Beat	3.5/5 stars
Allmusic	3/5 stars

Bossa Nova: New Brazilian Jazz is an album by Argentine composer, pianist and conductor Lalo Schifrin recorded in 1962 and released on the Audio Fidelity label. The album was released during the height of the popularity of bossa nova music in the early 1960s and was one of Schifrin's earliest solo albums after leaving Dizzy Gillespie's band.

== Reception ==
The album peaked at 35 on the Billboard Albums Chart in 1963.

== Track listing ==
1. "Boato (Bistro)" (João Roberto Kelly) - 2:26
2. "Chora Tua Tristeza" (Oscar Castro-Neves, Luvercy Fiorini) - 2:38
3. "Poema Do Adeus" (Luís Antônio) - 3:19
4. "Apito No Samba" (Luís Antônio, Luís Bandeira) - 2:50
5. "Chega de Saudade" (Antônio Carlos Jobim, Vinicius de Moraes) - 5:19
6. "Bossa Em Nova York" (Jose Paulo, Dom Madrid) - 1:52
7. "O Amor E A Rosa" (João Pernambuco, Antônio Maria) - 3:34
8. "O Menino Desce O Morro (Little Brown Boy)" (Maria De Rosa, Vera Brasil) - 2:28
9. "Menina Feia" (Oscar Castro-Neves) - 2:25
10. "Ouça" (Maysa Matarazzo) - 3:56
11. "Samba de uma Nota Só" (Antônio Carlos Jobim, Newton Mendonça) - 3:44
12. "Patinho Feio (aka Ugly Duckling)" (Oscar Castro-Neves) - 3:01
- Recorded in New York City in June 1962

== Personnel ==
- Lalo Schifrin - piano, arranger
- Leo Wright - alto saxophone, flute
- Christopher White - bass
- Rudy Collins - drums
- Jose Paulo, Carmen Costa - Latin percussion
