= Between Broadway & Hollywood =

Studio album by Lalo Schifrin
- Released: 1963
- Recorded: May 27 & 29, 1963; New York City
- Genre: Jazz
- Length: 33:38
- Labels: MGM; E-4156
- Producer: Creed Taylor

Lalo Schifrin chronology
Samba Para Dos (1963)	Between Broadway & Hollywood (1963)	Explorations (1964)

Professional ratings
Review scores
Source	Rating
Allmusic	3/5 stars

Between Broadway and Hollywood is an album by Argentine composer, pianist and conductor Lalo Schifrin recorded in 1963 and released on the MGM label.

== Track listing ==
All compositions by Lalo Schifrin except as indicated

1. "Days of Wine and Roses" (Henry Mancini, Johnny Mercer) - 4:40
2. "Theme From "Lawrence Of Arabia"" (Maurice Jarre) - 5:54
3. "Hallucinations" - 4:03
4. "Who Will Buy" (Lionel Bart) - 2:43
5. "Hud" (Elmer Bernstein) - 5:50
6. "She Loves Me" (Jerry Bock, Sheldon Harnick) - 3:25
7. "Jive Orbit" - 3:00
8. "Impressions of Broadway" - 4:03
- Recorded in New York City on May 27, (tracks 1, 4 & 8) and May 29 (tracks 2, 3 & 5–7), 1963

== Personnel ==
- Lalo Schifrin - piano
- George Duvivier - bass
- Ed Shaughnessy - drums
