= Soul Talk (Leo Wright album) =

Studio album by Leo Wright
- Released: 1970
- Recorded: November 1, 1963
- Studio: NYC
- Genre: Jazz
- Length: 34:09
- Label: Vortex; 2011
- Producer: Nesuhi Ertegun

Leo Wright chronology
Suddenly the Blues (1962)	Soul Talk (1970)	Modern Jazz Studio Nr. 4 (1965)

Soul Talk is an album by saxophonist Leo Wright featuring performances recorded in 1963 for the Atlantic label but not released until 1970 on their Vortex subsidiary.

== Reception ==
Professional ratings
Review scores
Source	Rating
AllMusic	3/5 stars
The Penguin Guide to Jazz Recordings	3/4 stars

AllMusic awarded the album 3 stars.

== Track listing ==
All compositions by Leo Wright, except as indicated

1. "State Trooper" (Gloria Coleman) - 2:38
2. "Blue Leo" - 4:43
3. "Sometimes I Feel Like a Motherless Child" (Traditional) - 4:29
4. "Soul Talk" - 5:22
5. "Poopsie's Minor" - 4:46
6. "Skylark" (Hoagy Carmichael, Johnny Mercer) - 5:20
7. "Blues Fanfare" - 6:28

== Personnel ==
- Leo Wright - alto saxophone, flute
- Gloria Coleman - organ
- Kenny Burrell - guitar
- Frankie Dunlop - drums
