= The Moon Is Down =

Novel by John Steinbeck

- First Edition
- Author: John Steinbeck
- Cover artist: Frank Lieberman
- Language: English
- Genre: Dystopian Fiction
- Publisher: Viking Press
- Publication date: March 6, 1942
- Publication place: United States
- Media type: Print (Hardback & Paperback)
- Pages: 188
- LC Class: PS3537.T3234

The Moon Is Down is a 1942 novel by American writer John Steinbeck. The book is about the military occupation of a small town in Northern Europe by an unnamed army. Steinbeck wrote it as propaganda intended to fuel resistance movements in occupied countries during World War II. The book was widely bootlegged and adapted for the stage in Europe. The Moon Is Down was adapted into a film by Irving Pichel in 1943.

The novel's scenario echoed the occupation of Norway by Germany during World War II. Norway awarded Steinbeck the King Haakon VII Freedom Cross for the novel.

== Plot summary ==
Taken by surprise, a small coastal town is overrun by an invading army with little resistance. The town is important because it is a port that serves a large coal mine. Colonel Lanser, the head of the invading battalion, along with his staff establishes their headquarters in the house of Orden, the democratically elected and popular mayor.

As the reality of occupation sinks in and the weather turns bleak, with the snows beginning earlier than usual, the "simple, peaceful people" of the town are angry and confused. Colonel Lanser, a veteran of many wars, tries to operate under a veil of civility and law, but in his heart he knows that "there are no peaceful people" amongst those whose freedom has been taken away by force. The calm is soon torn apart when Alexander Morden, an erstwhile alderman and "a free man", is ordered to work in the mine. He strikes out at Captain Loft with a pickaxe, but Captain Bentick steps into its path and dies of it. After a showtrial, Morden is executed by a firing squad. This incident catalyzes the people of the town and they settle into "a slow, silent, waiting revenge." Sections of the railroad linking the port with the mine get damaged regularly, the machinery breaks down often, and the dynamo of the electricity generators gets short circuited. Whenever a soldier relaxes his guard, drinks or goes out with a woman, he is killed. Mayor Orden stands by his people, and tries to explain to Colonel Lanser that his goal – "to break man's spirit permanently" – is impossible.

The cold weather and the constant fear weighs heavy on the occupying force, many of whom wish the war to end so that they can return home. They realize the futility of the war and describe their victories as "the flies have conquered the flypaper." Some members of the resistance escape to England and ask the English for explosives so that the townspeople can intensify their efforts. English planes parachute-drop small packages containing dynamite sticks and chocolates all around the town. After the collaborator Corell receives an order from Lanser's superiors, the invaders take the mayor hostage along with his friend Dr. Winter, the town doctor and historian, and let it be known that any rebellious action will lead to their execution. Mayor Orden refuses to ask his people to stop active resistance, and feels that nothing can stop his people and that his death is imminent. He tells his wife that while he can be killed, the idea of freedom and democracy is beyond the reach of any army. Before his execution, Mayor Orden reminds Dr. Winter of the dialogues of Socrates in the Apology and Phaedo and tells him to make sure that the resistance continues.

== Title ==
The title of the book is a line from William Shakespeare's tragedy Macbeth. As Act II begins, Banquo asks his son Fleance, "How goes the night, boy?" Fleance replies, "The moon is down; I have not heard the clock." Macbeth soon arrives on his way to kill King Duncan. Fleance's simple observation foreshadows the evil that is about to occur. Steinbeck's allusion encapsulated the spiritual darkness of life under Nazi occupation.

The Moon Is Down is also a typical Steinbeck title with its two strongly accented words, as in The Grapes of Wrath or Sea of Cortez. The moon was a powerful, recurring symbol in Steinbeck's fiction.

== Characters ==
=== Invaders ===
- Colonel Lanser: the head of the occupying force; a World War I veteran.
- Captain Bentick: old, Anglophile; loves dogs, Christmas and "pink children". Is killed by Alex Morden in a fit of rage while trying to protect Captain Loft.
- Major Hunter: the engineer; has a model railroad at home.
- Captain Loft: young, ambitious; he lives and breathes the military.
- Lieutenant Prackle: apparently a good artist; had several blonde sisters.
- Lieutenant Tonder: a poet described as a "dark romantic", is killed by Molly Morden after flirting with her. Dreams of a romantic death in war.
- "the Leader": only referred to and never named; modeled on Adolf Hitler.

=== Townspeople ===
- George Corell: previously popular storekeeper, traitor, and spy who aids the invaders. The character is modeled on Vidkun Quisling, and in galley proofs sent to critics, he was still called Curseling.
- Mayor Orden: a man in his sixties, the long-time mayor of the town. He refuses to tell his people to cooperate with the invaders, knowing that they will not.
- Dr. Winter: the town doctor and an old friend and adviser of the mayor.
- Madame (Sarah): the mayor's wife; often fusses over his appearance.
- Joseph: the mayor's servant; frequently witnesses events in the mayor's house.
- Annie: the mayor's cook; active in the resistance, but not suspected because of her age.
- Alex Morden: kills Captain Bentick in a fit of rage with a pick-axe when he is ordered to work. Meant to attack Captain Loft but Captain Bentick saves Loft. First of the townspeople to be executed. Husband of Molly Morden.
- Molly Morden: his wife; leads on and kills Lieutenant Tonder after Alex's death.

== Writing ==
Before the United States entered World War II, John Steinbeck was concerned that Nazi propaganda was too effective. In the summer of 1940, he mused about setting up a propaganda office and discussed the idea with President Franklin D. Roosevelt. He also suggested dropping counterfeit money on the enemy to depress their currency.

Through his work in the Office of the Coordinator of Information (COI), Steinbeck met refugees who shared their experience about life under Nazi occupation. In September 1941, he began writing a novel and play about a conquered population fighting back. Steinbeck's novel was set in America. The COI's Foreign Information Service rejected the manuscript because it depicted a defeated U.S. Steinbeck shifted the setting to an unnamed country to circumvent the objection.

Steinbeck returned to the novel-play hybrid format he used in Of Mice and Men. He was partially motivated by the need to afford a divorce from Carol Henning, because he had fallen in love with Gwyn Conger. He finished the manuscript in November. Even though Steinbeck was disappointed with the draft, he had his agents circulate it to publishers and theatrical producers. In early December, the attack on Pearl Harbor guaranteed America's entry into the war.

== Reception ==
The Moon Is Down sold well and received many positive reviews. In The New York Times, John Chamberlain called it "the most memorable fiction to come out of this war" and recommended the British airdrop it into occupied territories along with sticks of dynamite and chocolate. The Times Book Review also liked the book, even if it was underbaked. They found that Steinbeck "letting off steam" made for a fine piece of propaganda. The book was also favorably reviewed in the New York Herald Tribune and Time.

The novel was published in March 1942 well before the United States had any appreciable military victories. Even the Doolittle Raid was more than a month away. Steinbeck's humane depiction of the occupying army was too tepid for many critics. In The New Yorker, Clifton Fadiman praised the novel as better patriotic melodrama than Maxwell Anderson's Candle in the Wind but disliked its simplistic message. James Thurber dismissed it in The New Republic, "Maybe a title like 'Guts in the Mud' would have produced a more convincing reality. Anyway, this little book needs more guts and less moon."

These two cavils spurred a debate that lasted for months. Steinbeck was hurt by the criticism that he had not vilified the Nazis enough. He later quipped, "It was said that I didn't know anything about war, and this was perfectly true, though how Park Avenue commandos found me out I can't conceive."

== Influence ==
In May 1942 during World War II, Winston Churchill recommended it to one of his cabinet members, "In addition to being a well-written story, it stresses, I think quite rightly, the importance of providing the conquered nations with simple weapons, such as sticks of dynamite, which could be easily concealed and are easy in operation." Steinbeck's idea could be traced to Operation Braddock, which began life as "Project Moon" in reference to the novel.

In 1943, a bowdlerized French translation of The Moon Is Down was published in Switzerland. It removed Steinbeck's implications of Germany as the aggressor. An unexpurgated translation was prepared in Nazi-occupied France by resistance publisher Les Éditions de Minuit. Paul Éluard suggested the title Nuits Noires (Black Nights). Jacques Debû-Bridel called the book "a masterpiece of understanding". Jean-Paul Sartre recalled that the novel "seemed to us all like a message from fighting America to the European underground." Steinbeck's work was acclaimed by both sides of the conflict. Novels like The Grapes of Wrath and In Dubious Battle were promoted by Germany and its collaborators because of their damning portrait of America.

Numerous other translations were published across occupied Europe, including Norwegian, Danish, Dutch, and possibly Italian. It was the best known work of U.S. literature in the Soviet Union during the war. John Steinbeck was proud of the morale boost his novel provided to conquered countries.

In 1945, Steinbeck was awarded the King Haakon VII Freedom Cross by the Norwegian government. A decade later, he was given the Commander's Cross of Franco-Belgian Gratitude.

== Adaptations ==
Herman Shumlin optioned Steinbeck's play while he was still writing it. When he read the finished product, he disliked its politics, and Oscar Serlin bought the rights. Serlin hired Lee Strasberg to direct the play. Both Strasberg and Clifford Odetts helped Steinbeck finalize the play.

The original Broadway production directed by Chester Erskine opened April 7, 1942 at the Martin Beck Theatre. The cast featured Otto Kruger as Colonel Lanser, Ralph Morgan as Mayor Orden, and Whitford Kane as Dr. Winter. It only ran for 55 performances. Oscar Serlin revealed that sales "withered under the repeated blasting of those critics who did not like the play".

King Haakon VII of Norway attended the opening of the London production of The Moon Is Down June 8, 1943, at Whitehall Theatre. The cast included Paul Scofield in the role of Alex Morden. Another adaptation at the Schauspielhaus Zürich was one of the great success of Swiss theater during the war and ran for over 200 performances.

In the spring of 1942, Twentieth Century Fox bought the film rights for $300,000. Irving Pichel directed the 1943 film adaptation which featured Cedric Hardwicke as Colonel Lanser, Henry Travers as Mayor Orden, and Lee J. Cobb as Dr. Winter.
