= Cantos Aztecas =

Studio album by Plácido Domingo
- Released: 1988
- Genre: Classical

Plácido Domingo solo album chronology
Vienna, City of My Dreams (1986)	Cantos Aztecas (1988)	The Unknown Puccini (1989)

Cantos Aztecas is a 1988 album of songs in the Aztec language composed by Lalo Schifrin and sung by Plácido Domingo.
