= Soul Sisters =

Studio album by Gloria Coleman
- Released: 1963
- Recorded: May 21, 1963
- Studio: Van Gelder Studio, Englewood Cliffs, NJ
- Genre: Jazz
- Length: 39:47
- Label: Impulse!
- Producer: Bob Thiele

Gloria Coleman chronology
Soul Sisters (1963)	Sings and Swings Organ (1965)

Soul Sisters is an album by American jazz organist Gloria Coleman featuring Pola Roberts recorded in 1963 for the Impulse! label.

== Reception ==
The Allmusic review by Brandon Burke awarded the album 3 stars, stating "One probably doesn't hear the name Gloria Coleman thrown around quite as often as other organists of the day. Similarly, the Impulse! label wasn't particularly known as a home for organ combos, but perhaps that's what makes this title the underappreciated gem that it is".

Professional ratings
Review scores
Source	Rating
Allmusic	3/5 stars

== Track listing ==
All compositions by Gloria Coleman except where noted

1. "Que Baby" – 4:05
2. "Sadie Green" – 4:30
3. "Hey Sonny Red" – 5:58
4. "Melba's Minor" – 6:26
5. "Funky Bob" (Grant Green) – 4:14
6. "My Lady's Waltz" – 6:28

- Recorded at Rudy Van Gelder Studio in Englewood Cliffs, New Jersey on May 21, 1963

== Personnel ==
- Gloria Coleman – organ
- Leo Wright – alto saxophone
- Grant Green – guitar
- Pola Roberts – drums
