= Murderer's Row (soundtrack) =

Murderers' Row

Soundtrack album by Lalo Schifrin
- Released: 1966
- Recorded: 1966; Hollywood, California
- Genre: Film score
- Length: 25:28
- Label: Colgems; COSO-5003
- Producer: Neely Plumb

Lalo Schifrin chronology
The Cincinnati Kid (1965)	Murderers' Row (1966)	The Dissection and Reconstruction of Music From the Past as Performed By the Inmates of Lalo Schifrin's Demented Ensemble as a Tribute to the Memory of the Marquis De Sade (1966)

Murderers' Row is a soundtrack album to the motion picture of the same name by Argentine composer, pianist and conductor Lalo Schifrin recorded in 1966 and released on the Colgems label. As with The Silencers, due to contractual arrangements Dean Martin's image is not on the album cover, nor is there any songs sung by him. His version of "I'm Not The Marrying Kind" that appears in the film is his Reprise album Happiness Is Dean Martin.

== Track listing ==
All compositions by Lalo Schifrin except as indicated

1. "Murderers' Row (Main Title)" - 2:07
2. "The Pin" - 2:10
3. "I'm Not The Marrying Kind" (Schifrin, Howard Greenfield) - 1:45
4. "Suzie's Theme" (Schifrin, Greenfield) - 2:14
5. "Dual Controls" - 2:11
6. "Solaris" - 2:02
7. "The Pendulum" - 2:30
8. "Iron Head" - 2:11
9. "Double Feature" - 2:14
10. "Frozen Dominique" - 2:13
11. "No Dining Allowed" - 1:51
12. "I'm Not The Marrying Kind (End Title)" (Schifrin, Greenfield) - 2:03

== Personnel ==
- Lalo Schifrin - piano, arranger, conductor
- Carol Kaye - electric bass
