= Kaleidoscope: Jazz Meets the Symphony =

Kaleidoscope: Jazz Meets the Symphony #6

Live album by Lalo Schifrin
- Released: 2005
- Recorded: 2005; Sydney Opera House
- Genre: Jazz & 21st-century classical music
- Length: 1:06:07
- Label: Aleph Records; ALEPH 034
- Producer: Lalo Schifrin

Lalo Schifrin chronology
Letters From Argentina (2005)	Kaleidoscope: Jazz Meets the Symphony #6 (2005)	Lalo Schifrin and Friends (2007)

Kaleidoscope: Jazz Meets the Symphony #6 is an album by Argentine composer, pianist and conductor Lalo Schifrin recorded live in concert at the Sydney Opera House with a jazz quartet and the Sydney Symphony Orchestra Recorded in 2005, it was released on the Aleph Records label. Joining Schifrin in the quartet are James Morrison on trumpet and trombone, Christian McBride on bass, and Gordon Rytmeister on drums. The album was the sixth in Schifrin's highly acclaimed "Jazz Meets the Symphony" series.

== Playlist ==
Source =

1. Paraphrase (Lalo Schifrin) 5:13
2. Bachianas Brasileiras No. 5, for voice & piano, A. 390 (Heitor Villa-Lobos, arranged by Schifrin) 5:53
3. Jazzette (Lalo Schifrin) 9:16
4. Peanut Vendor (Moisés Simons, arranged by Schifrin) 9:21
5. Pavane, for orchestra & chorus ad lib in F sharp minor, Op. 50 (Gabriel Fauré, arranged by Schifrin) 5:05
6. To Be Or Not To Bop (Lalo Schifrin) 8:41
7. El Salón México (Aaron Copland, arranged by Schifrin) 6:42
8. Slaughter On 10th Avenue (Richard Rodgers, arranged by Schifrin) 3:59
9. Prelude Number 2 (from Three Preludes for piano) (George Gershwin, arranged by Schifrin) 5:10
10. The Cincinnati Kid (Lalo Schifrin) 6:51
