= New Fantasy =

Studio album by Lalo Schifrin
- Released: 1964
- Recorded: June 9 & 10, 1964
- Studio: Van Gelder Studio, Englewood Cliffs, NJ
- Genre: Jazz
- Length: 33:43
- Label: Verve; V-8601
- Producer: Creed Taylor

Lalo Schifrin chronology
Explorations (1964)	New Fantasy (1964)	Gone with the Wave (1964)

New Fantasy is an album by Argentine composer, pianist and conductor Lalo Schifrin recorded in 1964 and released on the Verve label.

== Reception ==
The Allmusic review states "Schifrin often succeeds brilliantly in his own big-band idiom, loaded with trademarks that would pop up in some of his better film and TV scores".

Professional ratings
Review scores
Source	Rating
Allmusic	3/5 stars

== Track listing ==
1. "Prelude #2" (George Gershwin) - 5:00
2. "The Peanut Vendor" (Marion Sunshine, Moises Simons) - 6:00
3. "Bachianas Brasileiras #5 (Heitor Villa-Lobos) - 3:50
4. "New Fantasy" (Larry Green) - 2:30
5. "Slaughter on Tenth Avenue" (Richard Rodgers) - 3:07
6. "The Blues" (Duke Ellington) - 3:06
7. "Sabre Dance" (Aram Khachaturian) - 4:50
8. "El Salón México" (Aaron Copland) - 5:20
- Recorded at Van Gelder Studios in Englewood Cliffs, New Jersey on June 9 & 10, 1964

== Personnel ==
- Lalo Schifrin - piano, arranger, conductor
- Marky Markowitz, Ernie Royal, Clark Terry, Snooky Young - trumpet
- Jimmy Cleveland, Kai Winding, J. J. Johnson, Urbie Green, Tony Studd - trombone
- Ray Alonge, Bob Northern, Richard Berg, Earl Chapin - French horn
- Don Butterfield - tuba
- Jerome Richardson - flute, tenor saxophone
- Mundell Lowe - guitar
- George Duvivier - bass
- Grady Tate - drums
