= Oscar Serlin =

Oscar Serlin (January 30, 1901 – February 27, 1971) was a Broadway producer, best known for producing Life with Father, which opened in 1939 and became the longest running Broadway show of all time, at the time; it still holds the record as the longest running non-musical. Other plays he produced include The Moon is Down (1942) (based on the Steinbeck novel), Strip for Action (1942), The Family (1943) (based on the novel by Antonina Riasanovsky), and Life With Mother (1948).

Serlin was born in Russian Poland (Grodno Region) and emigrated to the United States when he was nine. In 1926, he graduated from DePaul University in Chicago, where he played football. Life With Father was far and away his most successful production (a few of his productions ran only a short time), and Serlin retired from producing in 1951. He died in New York City on February 27, 1971 after a long illness.
