= Explorations (Louis Bellson album) =

Studio album by Lalo Schifrin and Louis Bellson
- Released: 1964
- Recorded: February 10–11, 1964; Los Angeles
- Genre: Jazz
- Length: 32:35
- Labels: Roulette; R-52120
- Producer: Teddy Reig

Lalo Schifrin chronology
Between Broadway & Hollywood (1963)	Explorations (1964)	New Fantasy (1964)

Louis Bellson chronology
The Mighty Two (1963)	Explorations (1964)	Are You Ready for This? (1965)

Explorations is an album by Argentine composer, pianist and conductor Lalo Schifrin and American drummer Louis Bellson recorded in 1964 and released on the Roulette label. It was the first album composed entirely by Schifrin and features themes that would later be used in the television detective series Mannix.

== Track listing ==
All compositions by Lalo Schifrin

1. "Variations" - 3:19
2. "Primitive" - 5:27
3. "Explorations" - 5:15
4. "Cycles" - 2:15
5. "Ostinato" - 6:24
6. "Etude for Tympani and Strings" - 5:10
7. "Toledano" - 4:45
- Recorded in Los Angeles on February 10 & 11, 1964

== Personnel ==
- Lalo Schifrin - arranger, conductor
- Louis Bellson - drums, tympani, log drum, percussion
- Artie Kane - keyboards
- Alton Hendrickson - guitar
- Keith Mitchell - bass
- Erno Neufeld, Anatol Kaminsky, David Frisina, Sam Freed, Nathan Kaproff, George Kast, Alex Murray, Marvin Limonick - violin
- Sanford Schonbach, Virginia Majewski - viola
- Raphael Kramer, Eleanor Slatkin - cello
- Dorothy Remsen - harp
- Bobby Helfer - orchestra manager
