= The Happy Jazz of Rex Stewart =

Studio album by Rex Stewart
- Released: 1960
- Recorded: March 18, 1960
- Studio: Van Gelder Studio, Englewood Cliffs, NJ
- Genre: Jazz
- Length: 37:21
- Label: Swingville; SVLP 2006
- Producer: Esmond Edwards

Rex Stewart chronology
Chatter Jazz (1959)	The Happy Jazz of Rex Stewart (1960)	Rex Stewart Meets Henri Chaix (1966)

The Happy Jazz of Rex Stewart, also reissued as The Rex Stewart Memorial Album, is an album by cornetist Rex Stewart which was recorded in 1960 and released on Prestige Records' subsidiary Swingville label.

== Reception ==
Professional ratings
Review scores
Source	Rating
AllMusic	4.5/5 stars

Scott Yanow of AllMusic states, "Stewart's technique and range had shrunk a bit by 1960, but his sense of humor and ability to make colorful tonal variations were still very much intact. This is a particularly fun set with Stewart doubling on kazoo and taking three good-time vocals ... The music is full of good spirits and memorable moments ... Highly recommended and well worth searching for."

== Track listing ==
1. "Red Ribbon" (Dorothy J. Odam) – 3:04
2. "If I Could Be With You (One Hour Tonight)" (James P. Johnson, Henry Creamer) – 2:52
3. "Rasputin" (Rex Stewart) – 7:30
4. "Please Don't Talk About Me When I'm Gone" (Sam H. Stept, Sidney Clare) – 3:28
5. "Four or Five Times" (Byron Gay, Marco Hellman) – 2:48
6. "You Can Depend On Me" (Charles Carpenter, Louis Dunlap, Earl Hines) – 3:48
7. "San" (Lindsay McPhail, Walter Michels) – 3:23
8. "I Would Do Most Anything for You" (Harry Warren, Mack Gordon) – 4:00
9. "Tell Me" (Rex Stewart) – 3:40
10. "Nagasaki" (Warren, Mort Dixon) – 2:38

== Personnel ==
- Rex Stewart – cornet, kazoo, vocals
- John Dengler – bass saxophone, kazoo, washboard
- Wilbert Kirk – harmonica, tambourine
- Jerome Darr, Chauncey "Lord" Westbrook – guitar
- Benny Moten – bass
- Chuck Lampkin – drums
