= Intersections: Jazz Meets the Symphony =

Intersections: Jazz Meets the Symphony #5

Live album by Lalo Schifrin
- Released: August 14, 2001
- Recorded: November 24–25, 2000; Klaus-Von-Bismarck-Saal, WDR Cologne, Germany
- Genre: Jazz & 20th-century classical music
- Length: 64:38
- Label: Aleph Records; ALEPH 034
- Producer: Lalo Schifrin

Lalo Schifrin chronology
Bullitt (2000)	Intersections: Jazz Meets the Symphony #5 (2001)	Schifrin/ Schuller/ Shapiro: Piano Trios (2001)

Professional ratings
Review scores
Source	Rating
Allmusic	4/5 stars

Intersections: Jazz Meets the Symphony #5 is an album by Argentine composer, pianist and conductor Lalo Schifrin with a jazz quintet, the WDR Big Band, and the WDR Radio Orchestra of Cologne recorded in 2000 and released on the Aleph label in 2001. The AllMusic review of the album noted that only Duke Ellington and Woody Herman had previously combined a big band with a symphony orchestra. Joining Schifrin in the quintet were James Morrison on trumpet, fluegelhorn, and trombone, David Sánchez on soprano and tenor saxes, Christian McBride on bass, and Jeff Hamilton on drums. The album, the fifth in Schifrin's highly acclaimed "Jazz Meets the Symphony" series, was recorded before live audiences at two concerts in the Klaus-Von-Bismarck-Saal in Cologne, Germany, and an edited version was later broadcast on WDR radio and television.

Schifrin's musical arrangement for the track, "Scheherazade Fantasy" was nominated for the 2002 Grammy Award for Best Instrumental Arrangement.

== Playlist ==
Source =

1. Intersections (Lalo Schifrin) 4:52
2. Scheherazade Fantasy (Nicolai Rimsky-Korsakov, arranged by Schifrin) 7:36
3. Naima (John Coltrane, arranged by Schifrin) 5:45
4. Tokyo Blues (Horace Silver, arranged by Schifrin) 8:18
5. Bells (Lalo Schifrin) 4:58
6. Spartacus (Alex North, arranged by Schifrin) 5:38
7. The Baroque Connection (Lalo Schifrin) 4:17
8. Donna's Dream (Lalo Schifrin) 13:55
9. Basin Street Blues (Spencer Williams, arranged by Schifrin) 9:21
