= Che! =

1969 film by Richard Fleischer

- UK DVD cover
- Directed by: Richard Fleischer
- Screenplay by: Michael Wilson; Sy Bartlett
- Story by: David Karp; Sy Bartlett
- Produced by: Sy Bartlett
- Starring: Omar Sharif; Jack Palance; Cesare Danova; Robert Loggia; Woody Strode; Barbara Luna
- Cinematography: Charles F. Wheeler
- Edited by: Marion Rothman
- Music by: Lalo Schifrin
- Distributed by: 20th Century-Fox
- Release date: May 29, 1969 (New York City)
- Running time: 96 minutes
- Country: United States
- Languages: English; Spanish
- Budget: $5.1 million
- Box office: $2.5 million (US/Canada rentals)

Che! is a 1969 American biographical film directed by Richard Fleischer and starring Omar Sharif as Marxist revolutionary Ernesto "Che" Guevara. It follows Guevara from when he first landed in Cuba in 1956 to his death in Bolivia in 1967, although the film does not portray the formative pre-Cuban revolution sections of Guevara's life as described in the autobiographical book The Motorcycle Diaries (1993).

== Plot ==
The film tells of Che Guevara, a young Argentine doctor who proves his mettle during the Cuban guerrilla war in the late 1950s. He gains the respect of his men and becomes the leader of a patrol.

Fidel Castro is impressed by Guevara's tactics and discipline and makes him his chief adviser. When Castro defeats Cuban dictator Fulgencio Batista after two years of fighting, Guevara directs a series of massive reprisals, yet, Guevara dreams of fomenting a worldwide revolution. After Castro backs down during the Cuban Missile Crisis, Guevara accuses Castro of being a Soviet tool and decides to leave Cuba.

Guevara lands in Bolivia, where he attempts to begin his dream of a worldwide peasant revolution, but the Bolivian peasants do not follow his lead and the Bolivian Army pursues him.

== Cast ==
- Omar Sharif as Che Guevara
- Jack Palance as Fidel Castro
- Cesare Danova as Ramon Valdez
- Robert Loggia as Faustino Morales
- Woody Strode as Guillermo
- Barbara Luna as Anita Marquez
- Frank Silvera as Goatherd
- Albert Paulsen as Captain Vasquez
- Linda Marsh as Tamara "Tania" Bunke
- Tom Troupe as Felipe Muñoz
- Adolph Caesar as Juan Almeida Bosque
- Rudy Diaz as Willy
- Perry Lopez as Eliseo "Rolando" Reyes Rodríguez
- Abraham Sofaer as Pablo Rojas
- Richard Angarola as Colonel Salazar
- Sarita Vara as Celia Sanchez
- Gil Serna as Lieutenant Suarez
- Paul Bertoya as Raúl Castro

== Production ==
The film was directed by Richard Fleischer who said before filming:

An enormous amount of pressure has been brought to bear on this film – both for and against the subject. Each group is afraid we're going to favor the other. The picture will be a character study, and I will only say that it is neither pro nor anti Guevera. The printing of his diary caused only minor changes to the picture... I consider our sources for information impeccable and I cannot tell you who they are.

"We are doing purely the story Che, the person, not the movement", said producer Sy Bartlett. "We want to show what happened with the people who touched his life."

Filming started in October in Puerto Rico. The island was chosen because South America was considered too politically unstable.

== Release ==
The film opened without press screenings on May 29, 1969, at Loew's Cine and the new Penthouse theatre in New York City. It grossed $76,000 in its opening week.

== Critical reception ==
The film received mostly negative reviews at the time of its release. Che! was listed in the book The Fifty Worst Films of All Time (1978). The Book of Lists (1977) labeled it "a cardboard, pseudo-historical drama" and noted that "Poor Sharif is forced to deliver lines such as 'The peasant is like a flower, and the revolutionary like a bee. Neither can survive or propagate without the other'".

Film critic Roger Ebert panned the film and the motivations for producing the drama, writing: "From the beginning, it sounded like a bad dream. Hollywood was making a movie about Che Guevara. Why? Probably because somebody smelled easy money, having been inspired by the sales figures on Che posters. That must have been the reason, because Che! is abundant evidence that no one connected with this stinkeroo gave a damn about Che Guevara, Fidel Castro, the Cuban Revolution or anything else requiring more than five seconds' thought".

Fleischer later said "the picture was a disaster. It should never have been made. People got emotional about it. By the time the memos from the board of directors got to me, they'd taken out all the pro-Che things. It took no sides, which wasn't what we started out to do. The producer was no help. He gave in so easily."

== Box office ==
According to Fox records the film required $9,400,000 in rentals to break even and by 11 December 1970 had made $4,100,000. By September 1970 Fox estimated they had lost $3,389,000 on the film.

== Soundtrack ==
Che!

Soundtrack album by Lalo Schifrin
- Released: 1969
- Recorded: May 7, 9 & 30, 1969; Los Angeles
- Genre: Film score
- Labels: Tetragrammaton; T-5006
- Producer: Don Shain

Lalo Schifrin chronology
Bullitt (1968)	Che! (1969)	Kelly's Heroes (1970)

The film score was composed, arranged and conducted by Lalo Schifrin and the soundtrack album was released on the Tetragrammaton label in 1969.

=== Track listing ===
All compositions by Lalo Schifrin except as indicated

1. "Ché (Orchestra Version)" – 2:22
2. "La Columna" – 2:34
3. "Emboscada" – 3:10
4. "La Ruta" – 2:42
5. "Charangos" – 2:04
6. "Fiesta Numero Dos" - 3:06
7. "Recuerdos" – 2:44
8. "Fiesta Numero Uno" – 2:13
9. "Anita" – 2:00
10. "La Barraca" – 1:56
11. "Tiempo Pasado" – 3:00
12. "Ché (solo guitar version)" – 3:17

=== Personnel ===
- Lalo Schifrin – piano, arranger, conductor
- Marcus Cabuto, Luis Gasca – trumpet
- Ronnie Lang, Jose Lazano, Bud Shank, Sheridon Stokes, Tom Scott, Ted Nash, Justin Gordon – flute
- George del Barrio – piano, arranger
- Bob Bain, Dennis Budimer, Jose Gamboa, Al Hendrickson, Lalo Ruiz, Tommy Tedesco – guitar
- Humberto Cane, Bill Plummer – bass
- Francisco Aguabella, Larry Bunker, Julio Collazo, Orlando Lopez, Mongo Santamaría, Ken Watson – percussion
- Alfredo Ebat, Bobby Bruce, Erno Neufeld, David Frisina, Paul Shure, Marvin Limonick, Alexander Murray, George Mast, Nathan Kaproff, Bonnie Douglas, Anatol Kaminsky, Herman Clebanoff – violin
- Myra Kestenbaum, Peter Mark, Allan Harshman, Milton Thomas – viola
- Raphael Kramer, Edgar Lustgarten, Kurt Rener – cello
- Dorothy Remsen, Catherine Gotthoffer – harp
- Robert Helfer – orchestra manager
- Kaskara – voice (tracks 3, 5 & 12)

== See also ==
- List of American films of 1969
- The Motorcycle Diaries (2004 film) directed by Walter Salles
- Che (2008 film) directed by Steven Soderbergh
