= Perceptions (Dizzy Gillespie album) =

Studio album by Dizzy Gillespie
- Released: 1961
- Recorded: May 18 and 22, 1961
- Studio: Van Gelder Studio, Englewood Cliffs, NJ
- Genre: Jazz
- Length: 33:19
- Label: Verve; MG V-8411
- Producer: Creed Taylor

Dizzy Gillespie chronology
Gillespiana (1960)	Perceptions (1961)	New Wave! (1963)

Perceptions a 1961 album by American jazz trumpeter Dizzy Gillespie and was composed and arranged for trumpet soloist and large jazz orchestra by J. J. Johnson. The piece was commissioned by Dizzy Gillespie and recorded in 1961 for the Verve label. The instrumentation of the orchestra is unusual in that no saxophones or woodwinds are used.

== Reception ==
The AllMusic review by Scott Yanow states: "Often reminiscent of classical music, Johnson's writing allows plenty of room for Gillespie to improvise. The result is a rather unique set of music that is well worth searching for."

Professional ratings
Review scores
Source	Rating
AllMusic	3/5 stars
DownBeat	3.5/5 stars

== Track listing ==
All compositions by J. J. Johnson

=== Side A ===
1. "The Sword of Orion" – 4:33
2. "Jubelo" – 6:37
3. "Blue Mist" – 6:52

=== Side B ===
1. "Fantasia" – 7:35
2. "Horn of Plenty" – 5:09
3. "Ballade" – 3:30

== Personnel ==
- Dizzy Gillespie – trumpet
- Gunther Schuller – conductor
  - Joe Wilder, Bernie Glow, Robert Nagel, Ernie Royal, Doc Severinsen, Nick Travis – trumpet
  - Urbie Green, Jimmy Knepper – trombone
  - Paul Faulise, Dick Hixson – bass trombone
  - Jim Buffington, John Barrows, Paul Ingraham, Robert Northern – French horn
  - Harvey Phillips, William Stanley – tuba
  - Gloria Agostini, Laura Newell – harp
  - George Duvivier – bass
  - Charlie Persip – drums
  - Michael Colgrass – percussion

== Production ==
- Rudy Van Gelder – recording engineer
- Pete Turner – photography
