= Operation Braddock =

Secret service measure

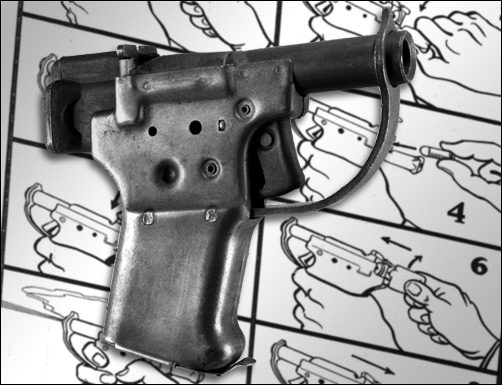
"Liberator" pistol

Operation Braddock was a secret service measure planned and carried out by the British Special Operations Executive (SOE) from 1943 onwards during the Second World War. The aim was to create confusion, fears, insecurity and demoralisation in enemy territory by dropping so-called "attack packages". The dropped packages were to contain special grenades, pocket flares, a small firearm or incendiary devices. Subversive forces, prisoners of war or forced labourers, equipped with these and operating in the enemy territory, should then carry out attacks that become a significant threat to the enemy.

== History ==
Operation Braddock was originally called "Project Moon" due to its inspiration by John Steinbeck's 1942 novel The Moon Is Down. The British secret service originally concluded that a mass distribution of "covert" explosives or incendiary devices over enemy territory was not practical. On the one hand, there were not enough planes to transport the packages, and on the other hand there was the fear that the German side could subsequently take revenge on prisoner-of-war soldiers. Moreover, it was thought that children playing could be injured or even killed by explosives. In the course of 1943, however, the Minister responsible for the operation, Lord Selborne, came to the conclusion that the war situation had changed radically in the meantime and that it was now necessary to at least paralyze or obstruct communications in the areas occupied by the enemy. In addition, unintentional injuries to children could easily be prevented by technical features of the means used.

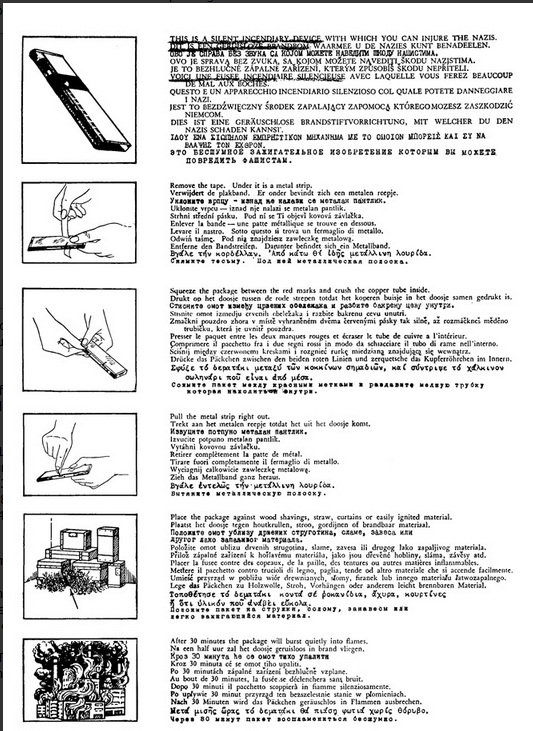
Instructions for the use of a fire pack

The SOE subsequently began to develop a deployment scenario. The Braddock I plan consisted of dropping 50,000 "attack packages" by parachute over enemy territory. In addition to specially designed grenades, the packages were to contain a special firearm called "Liberator" pistol. This very simply constructed weapon could fire only one single cartridge, but reserves of 10 additional cartridges were supplied. One million of these pistols were produced in the United States for $ 2.10 each. The Braddock I scenario was finally abandoned and the simple weapons were partly delivered to the French resistance and insurgents in East Asia.

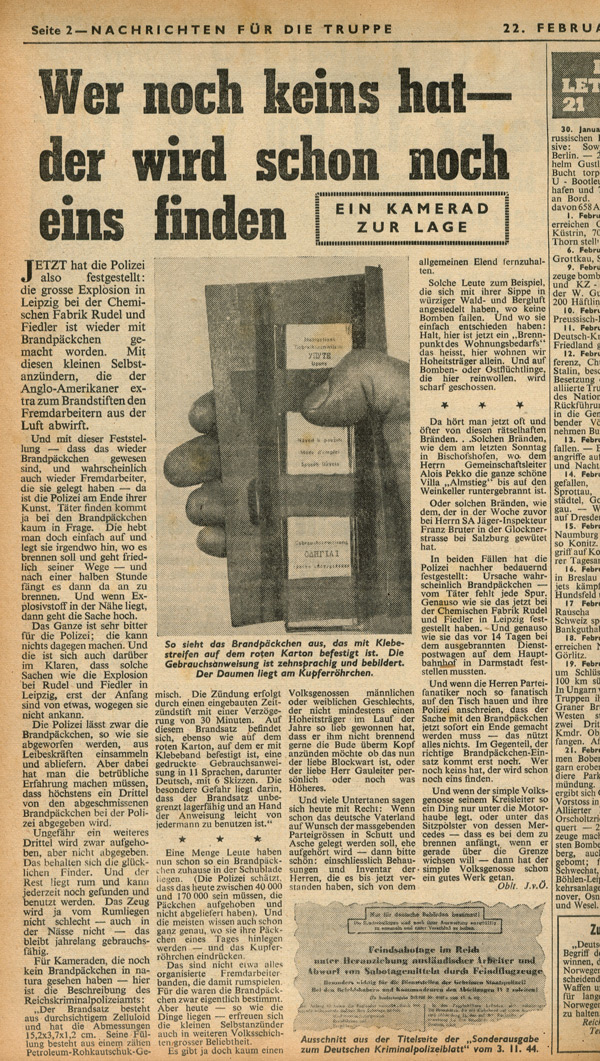
Nachrichten für die Truppe from 19 February 1945

For Braddock II it was planned to distribute about 3 million incendiary devices (called "Braddocks") over Germany and Italy, which were to be used for the purpose of sabotage by foreign forced labourers and resistance fighters against the Nazi regime. The SOE argued that if only one percent of the incendiary devices were successfully applied, there would be about 30,000 fires across Germany.

The incendiary package consisted of a small, transparent celluloid casing filled with a flammable gel. This was ignited by destroying the casing with an integrated "firing pin". Half an hour later the flames erupted and then burned for about four minutes at a temperature of 2000 degrees Celsius. Later, fire packs were also equipped with different time fuses. There were some with delays of 15 or 30 minutes, as well as three, eight and 34 hours. On the outside of the package there were instructions for handling in eleven different languages.

After several months of discussions, it was finally decided in May 1944 to carry out Operation Braddock II as soon as possible after the so-called D-Day. Eventually, on 25 September 1944, the first 200,000 fire packs were dropped by the US Air Force over the Frankfurt and Mainz region. On this day, the propaganda channel "Voice of SHAEF" transmitted an open appeal to foreign forced labourers in Germany. "The hour of action has come," the radio announced, explaining that in some parts of Germany organized cells of foreigners are now being supplied with materials for active resistance. Anyone who found a parcel was told to read the enclosed instructions and hide the so-called "braddocks" in a safe place until the finder had worked out a plan for optimal sabotage use.

After dropping the fire packs over Frankfurt, a SS unit occupied, among other things, the Dutch forced labourers' dormitory in the "Kristallpalast" in Große Gallusstraße. The responsible police authority announced that 20 to 25,000 items have already been collected since the packages were dropped. It is feared that many thousands more have already been found by foreign workers or other unreliable "elements" and that they are willing to use them to commit acts of sabotage. It has been noted that an unusually high percentage of foreign workers have not come to work.

It was not until February 1945 that very sporadic further "Braddocks" were dropped in various parts of Germany, the last such action taking place over the town of Fürth on 5 April 1945. After that, further deployments of "Braddocks" were no longer considered sensible. On the one hand, the defeat of Germany was imminent, on the other hand, there were still fears that German security forces could start large-scale retaliatory measures against prisoners of war or forced labourers. The remainders of the fire packs were destroyed on 3 May 1945 with the comment: "They would make a nice bonfire for the VE-Day".

== Legacy ==
The success of "Operation Braddock" is difficult to assess retrospectively. In view of the large number of fires that broke out in attacked cities by bombs anyway, the proportion of successful sabotage operations by fire packs cannot be determined.

== Sources ==
- Lee Richards: The black Art: British clandestine psychological warfare against the Third Reich, East Sussex BN10 7UB, 2010, ISBN 0-9542936-2-2.
- Peter Wilkinson, Joan Bright Astley: Gubbins & SOE, Pen & Sword Books Ltd, 2010, ISBN 978 1 8488 4421 6.
- Denis Rigden: Kill the Führer: Section X and Operation Foxley, The History Press, 1999, ISBN 978 0 7524 7574 5.
- Fredric Boyce, Douglas Everett: SOE the scientific secrets, The History Press, 2003, ISBN 978 0 7524 7580 6.
