= Chuck Lampkin =

American jazz musician

Chuck Lampkin was an American jazz percussionist and TV news anchorman.

== Early years ==
Charles Roland "Chuck" Lampkin was born on June 5, 1934, in Cleveland, Ohio, to Charles and Myrtle (née Caldwell) Lampkin, both of Alabama. In 1933, Charles Lampkin Sr., a pioneer of Spoken Word, graduated from Cleveland Central High School, Langston Hughes's alma mater. By 1934 he was a high school music teacher in the WPA program. His first wife Myrtle worked as a secretary for the Veterans Administration from 1946, retiring as an adjudicator in 1976.

== Career in music ==
Lampkin studied piano from a young age and taught himself percussion while touring with dance bands during the 1950s. He recorded a Dixieland jazz album, The Happy Jazz of Rex Stewart, for Verve in March 1960. Expecting to be drafted, he joined the U.S. Army band in 1958 as a percussionist to influence over where and how he would serve. He was drafted into the U.S. army and sent to West Germany around the time of the Cuban Missile Crisis.

Around 1960, Lampkin became the percussionist for the Dizzy Gillespie Quintet. On November 20, 1960, the quintet recorded the Gillespiana album for in Paris. The quintet played at jazz venues such as Birdland in New York City and on February 9, 1961, recorded An Electrifying Evening with the Dizzy Gillespie Quintet at the Museum of Modern Art. A month later on March 4, 1961, the quintet performed at Carnegie Hall and recorded Carnegie Hall Concert. In September, the quintet recorded A Musical Safari – Live at the Monterey Jazz Festival.

=== Jazz Casual ===
Jazz Casual was a series produced for National Educational Television (NET), the predecessor to the Public Broadcasting Service (PBS). The show was produced by Richard Moore and KQED of San Francisco, California. It ran from 1961 to 1968 and was hosted by journalist and jazz critic Ralph J. Gleason, who would go on to co-found Rolling Stone magazine. The Dizzy Gillespie Quintet had its debut on the program on January 17, 1961.

=== State Department Jazz Ambassador ===
In 1956, the Dizzy Gillespie Quintet became part of a campaign by the State Department to spread American culture and music around the world during the Cold War, especially into countries whose allegiances were not well defined or that were perceived as being at risk of aligning with the Soviet Union. As a first salvo in a program that would continue for more than two decades, Congressman Adam Clayton Powell Jr. proposed that Dizzy Gillespie form a big band to represent the U.S. as musical envoys. The State Department and the Eisenhower Administration agreed, and the group embarked for southern Europe and the Middle East in 1956. In 1960 and 1961, Lampkin toured with the quintet to the UK, France, Sweden, and Brazil.

Starting in 1963, Lampkin joined the Eddie "Lockjaw" Davis Quintet and recorded Bossa Nova (1963) and Jazz for Breakfast at Tiffany's.

=== The Ahmad Jamal Trio ===
In 1963 Lampkin joined Ahmad Jamal and bassist Jamil Sulieman to form the Ahmad Jamal Trio. Three albums were produced: Naked City Theme, The Roar of the Greasepaint, and Macanudo.

When earning a living as a jazz musician became a challenge, Lampkin turned his attention to television. On November 2, 1970, on WBEN-TV in Buffalo, New York, he became one of the first black men to present the nightly news in North America.

== Career in broadcast journalism (1970–1999) ==
Chuck Lampkin presented the nightly news on WBEN TV (later WIVB TV) in Buffalo from 1970 until 1980 when he moved to WDSU-TV in New Orleans. He continued in this capacity until 1985 when he became director of telecommunications for Mayor Ernest Nathan Morial. In the early 90s, Lampkin created a television show called "Cookin with Soul" and tried, without success, to get it into syndication. From 1995, Lampkin presented the news for News 12 New Jersey, a cable channel, until he had a stroke in 1999.

== Death ==
On February 10, 2003, Chuck Lampkin died of kidney failure and other ailments. His funeral was conducted on February 18 by Rev. Dale Lind at St. Peter's Lutheran Church in Manhattan where the late Puerto Rican pastor John Gensil had started a Jazz vespers service in the 1960s. Lampkin was survived by his wife Gail Robichaux and a son and daughter from prior relationships.
