= New Wave! =

New Wave

Studio album by Dizzy Gillespie
- Released: March 1963
- Recorded: May – July 1962
- Genre: Jazz, bossa nova
- Label: Philips

Dizzy Gillespie chronology
Dizzy on the French Riviera (1962)	New Wave (1963)	The New Continent (1962)

New Wave! is an album by Dizzy Gillespie consisting of live and studio performances, recorded in 1962 and released on the Philips label in 1963.

== Reception ==
Professional ratings
Review scores
Source	Rating
AllMusic	4.5/5 stars
Down Beat	4.5/5 stars
The Encyclopedia of Popular Music	3/5 stars

In his DownBeat magazine review of March 14, 1963, jazz critic Don DeMichael wrote that "Dizzy plays marvelously on this record... There's a spirit evident that is all too often missing from today's record sessions – a spirit of vivacious humor and playing-for-the-hell-of-it."

The AllMusic review states: "this was one of Dizzy Gillespie's finest sessions of the 1960s... Highly recommended."

== Track listing ==
1. "In a Shanty in Old Shanty Town"
2. "Careless Love"
3. "Chega de Saudade"
4. "Taboo"
5. "Gee Baby Ain't I Good to You"
6. "One Note Samba"
7. "Manhã de Carnaval"
8. "Pergunte ao Joao"

== Personnel ==
- Tracks 1, 2, 5:
  - Dizzy Gillespie - trumpet
  - Leo Wright - alto sax, flute
  - Lalo Schifrin - piano
  - Bola Sete - guitar
  - Chris White - bass
  - Rudy Collins - drums
  - Jose Paula - guitar, tamb, perc, vcl
  - Carmen Costa - vcl, maracas

Recorded: New York City, July 1962

- Track 6:
  - Dizzy Gillespie - trumpet
  - Leo Wright - alto sax, flute
  - Lalo Schifrin - piano
  - Elek Bacsik - guitar
  - Chris White - bass
  - Rudy Collins - drums
  - Pepito Riestra - percussion

Recorded: Juan-les-Pins, France, July, 1962

- Tracks 3, 4, 7, 8:
  - Dizzy Gillespie - trumpet
  - Leo Wright - alto sax, flute
  - Charlie Ventura - tenor sax, bass sax
  - Lalo Schifrin - piano
  - Chris White - bass
  - Rudy Collins - drums
  - Jose Paula - guitar, tambourine, percussion, vocals
  - Carmen Costa - cabasa, güiro, vocals

Recorded: New York City, May 1962
