= Gillespiana =

Studio album by Dizzy Gillespie
- Released: 1960
- Recorded: November 14–16, 1960
- Studio: NYC
- Genre: Jazz
- Length: 41:19
- Label: Verve; MG V 8394
- Producer: Norman Granz

Dizzy Gillespie chronology
A Portrait of Duke Ellington (1960)	Gillespiana (1960)	Perceptions (1961)

Gillespiana is an album by trumpeter Dizzy Gillespie featuring compositions and arrangements by Lalo Schifrin recorded in 1960 and released on the Verve label.

== Reception ==
Professional ratings
Review scores
Source	Rating
AllMusic	3/5 stars
DownBeat	5/5 stars

The contemporaneous DownBeat reviewer awarded the album five stars and wrote: "Gillespiana is a distinguished work written expressly to exploit the trumpeter's remarkable talent."

== Track listing ==
All compositions by Lalo Schifrin

=== Side A ===
1. "Prelude" – 5:52
2. "Blues" – 11:16
3. "Panamericana" – 4:39

=== Side B ===
1. "Africana" – 7:31
2. "Toccata" – 12:01

== Personnel ==
- Dizzy Gillespie, John Frosk, Ernie Royal, Clark Terry, Joe Wilder – trumpet
- Urbie Green, Frank Rehak, Britt Woodman – trombone
- Paul Faulise – bass trombone
- Jim Buffington (tracks 1–3), Al Richman (tracks 1–3), William Lister (tracks 4 & 5), Gunther Schuller, Morris Secon (tracks 4 & 5), Julius Watkins – French horn
- Don Butterfield – tuba
- Leo Wright – alto saxophone, flute
- Lalo Schifrin – piano, arranger
- Art Davis – bass
- Chuck Lampkin – drums
- Willie Rodriguez – timpani
- Jack Del Rio – bongos
- Candido Camero – conga

== See also ==
- Gillespiana In Cologne
