= Braddock (surname) =

Braddock is an English surname. Notable people with the surname include:

- Andrew Braddock (politician), Australian politician
- Andrew Braddock (priest), British Anglican priest
- Bessie Braddock, British politician
- Bobby Braddock, American country music songwriter
- Christine Braddock, a British further education administrator and academic
- Edward Braddock, British army general in colonial America
- G. Holmes Braddock (1925–2025), American politician
- James Braddock (cricketer), English cricketer
- James J. Braddock, American boxer also known as "Cinderella Man"
- Jeremy Braddock, a former band member of 100 Demons
- Paige Braddock, American cartoonist best known for her Eisner-nominated comic strip Jane's World
- Scott Braddock, retired American professional wrestler
- Thomas Braddock (priest) (1556–1607), Anglican clergyman and author
- Tom Braddock (1887–1976), British politician
- Zach Braddock, a former professional baseball pitcher
- Brad Bradley, American professional wrestler who wrestled for the WWE as Ryan Braddock, previously known as Jay Bradley
- Michael Depoli, American professional wrestler who wrestled for the WWE as Tony Braddock, previously known as Roadkill

Fictional characters:

- Benjamin Braddock, protagonist of the 1967 movie The Graduate
- Col. James Braddock, main character of Missing in Action (film)
- Captain John Braddock, the police captain protagonist of TV's Racket Squad, played by Reed Hadley.
- Matt Braddock, fictional bomber pilot
- Marvel Comics Universe
  - Brian Braddock, formerly known as Captain Britain and currently as Captain Avalon. Brother of Betsy and Jamie.
  - Elizabeth "Betsy" Braddock, formerly known as Psylocke and currently as Captain Britain. Sister of Brian and Jamie.
  - Jamie Braddock, also known as Monarch. Brother of Brian and Betsy.
- Jackson Braddock, a character in Desperate Housewives, played by Gale Harold.
- Scott "Scotty" Braddock was a major character in the film Jeepers Creepers 2

== See also ==
- Braddock (disambiguation)
