= Gloria Coleman =

American jazz musician

Gloria Coleman (died February 18, 2010) was an American musician.

Coleman played bass, piano then organ. As a jazz organist she released two albums. The first, Soul Sisters by the Gloria Coleman Quartet, was for the Impulse! Records label. It featured drummer Pola Roberts, Leo Wright and Grant Green. It was produced by Bob Thiele. The second album featured Ray Copeland, Dick Griffith, James Anderson, Earl Dunbar and Charlie Davis. A more recent album was released in 2008 on Doodlin' Records (Sweet Missy) which reunited Gloria with her former husband saxophonist George Coleman. It featured their son George Coleman, Jr. on drums; guitarists, Eric Johnson and Calvin Keys as well as drummer Deszon Claiborne. Dr. Lonnie Smith is also heard on one track.

Coleman wrote many songs for Bobbi Humphrey and Ernestine Anderson, among others.

Coleman married saxophonist George Coleman. The couple had two children and divorced. She died on February 18, 2010.

== Discography ==
=== As leader ===
- Soul Sisters (Impulse!, 1963) with Pola Roberts
- Sings And Swings Organ (Mainstream, 1965)
- Sweet Missy (Doodlin', 2007)

=== As sidewoman ===
With Leo Wright

- Soul Talk (Vortex, 1963 [rel. 1970])

With Hank Crawford

- Groove Master (Milestone, 1990)

With Nat Simpkins

- Cookin' with Some Barbecue (Muse, 1994)
