= Eliseo Reyes Rodríguez =

Cuban guerrillero

- Born: April 27, 1940; San Luis, Cuba
- Died: April 25, 1967; Bolivia
- Occupation(s): Politician, partisan

Eliseo Reyes Rodríguez, also known by the war name "Captain San Luis" or "Rolando", (San Luis, province of Santiago de Cuba, April 27, 1940 - Bolivia, April 25, 1967) was a Cuban socialist politician and guerrilla fighter.

Reyes was born on April 27, 1940, on the Santa Isabel farm, in the Chamarreta neighborhood, in San Luis, Oriente, now the province of Santiago de Cuba. In 1953, at just 13 years old, he became aware of the clandestine actions of the Movement of July 26 and leaned towards armed struggle for the Cuban Revolution. In 1957, he joined as a messenger of Column 4 of the Cuban Rebel Army. He rose through the military ranks for his actions in rejecting the offensive of Batista's dictatorship in the summer of 1958 and in the invasive campaign in Las Villas, always under the command of Che Guevara.

With the triumph of the Cuban Revolution, he was at the forefront of the Ministry of the Interior (MININT) in Pinar del Río, in the fight against internal counter-revolution in that area. His merits led to his selection by the first central committee of the Communist Party of Cuba.

In late 1966, Che Guevara chose him for the reinforcement detachment that would fight in the jungles of Bolivia. Shortly thereafter, Che himself described him as "the most complete cadre, both politically and militarily, of all the components of the guerrilla."

Reyes died in combat on April 25, 1967, during an ambush against the guerrilla conducted on the El Mesón farm, between Ticucha and the Iquira River, two days before his 27th birthday. After his death, Che wrote in his diary: "We have lost the best man in the guerrilla, and naturally, one of its pillars. My comrade, since he was almost a child, he was a messenger of Column 4, until the invasion and this new revolutionary adventure. About his dark death, it is only necessary to say, for a hypothetical future, that could crystallize: Your small, brave captain's body has spread out its metallic form immensely."
