= Braddock =

Braddock may refer to:

== Places ==
=== England, United Kingdom ===
- Braddock, Cornwall

=== Canada ===
- Braddock, Saskatchewan

=== United States ===
- Braddock, New Jersey
- Braddock, North Dakota
- Braddock, Pennsylvania
- Braddock, Virginia

==== Facilities ====
- G. Holmes Braddock High School, Miami, Florida
- UPMC Braddock (Braddock, Pennsylvania), a hospital

== People ==
- Braddock (surname)

=== Middle name or nickname ===
- Lemuel Braddock Schofield, Attorney at law
- Rosemarie Braddock DeWitt, an American actress
- W. Braddock Hickman, president of the Federal Reserve Bank of Cleveland from 1963 to 1970
- John Braddock Clontz, is a former relief pitcher in Major League Baseball from 1995–2000.
- Anderson "Braddock" Silva, Brazilian heavyweight kickboxer
- Micky Dolenz, early career name of Mickey Braddock, actor from Circus Boy series 1956-1964

== Other uses ==
- Braddock (1968 film), a TV movie about a futuristic private eye Braddock played by Tom Simcox aired as part of the Premiere (TV series)
- Braddock: Missing in Action III (1988 film) Chuck Norris film
- Operation Braddock, a secret service measure during World War II

== See also ==
- Braddock Road (disambiguation)
