= James Braddock (cricketer) =

English cricketer

James Braddock (born 23 April 1852) was an English cricketer who played for Lancashire in one match in 1873. He was born in Whitle, Glossop, Derbyshire. His date and place of death are not known.

Braddock also umpired one first-class match in 1883.
