= Lalo Schifrin =

Argentine-American composer (1932–2025)

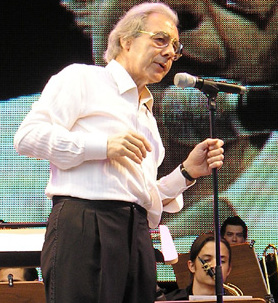
- Schifrin in Cologne, Germany, July 2006

Background information
- Born: Boris Claudio Schifrin; June 21, 1932; Buenos Aires, Argentina
- Died: June 26, 2025 (aged 93) Los Angeles, California, U.S.
- Education: University of Buenos Aires; Conservatoire de Paris
- Genres: Film score; jazz; big band; rock; contemporary classical
- Occupations: Musician; composer; arranger; conductor
- Instruments: Piano; keyboards
- Years active: 1952–2025
- Labels: Tico; Roulette; Audio Fidelity; MGM; Verve; Colpix; Colgems; Dot; Warner Bros.; Paramount; EntrActe; CTI; Tabu; Palo Alto; Atlantic; Aleph
- Spouses: Silvia Schon (m. 1958, divorced) Donna Cockrell (m. 1971)

Boris Claudio "Lalo" Schifrin (Spanish pronunciation: [ˈlalo ˈʃifɾin]; June 21, 1932 – June 26, 2025) was an Argentine and American pianist, composer, arranger and conductor. Initially prominent as a jazz composer, he was best known for his large body of film and television scores, which incorporates jazz and Latin American musical elements alongside traditional orchestration.

Schifrin's best known compositions include the themes from T.H.E. Cat (1966), Mission: Impossible (1966) and Mannix (1967), as well as the scores to Cool Hand Luke (1967), Bullitt (1968), THX 1138 (1971), Enter the Dragon (1973), The Four Musketeers (1974), Voyage of the Damned (1976), The Eagle Has Landed (1976), The Amityville Horror (1979) and the Rush Hour trilogy (1998–2007). Schifrin was also noted for collaborations with Clint Eastwood from the late 1960s to the 1980s, particularly the Dirty Harry film series. He composed the Paramount Pictures fanfare used from 1976 to 2004.

Schifrin was a five-time Grammy Award winner; he was nominated for six Academy Awards (five for Best Original Score and once for Best Original Song) and four Emmy Awards. In 2019, he received an Honorary Academy Award from the Academy of Motion Picture Arts and Sciences in recognition of his successful career.

== Life and career ==
=== Early life and education ===
Boris Claudio Schifrin was born in Buenos Aires, Argentina on June 21, 1932. The nickname "Lalo" was the normal Argentine diminutive for his second name, Claudio. When he came to the U.S., he changed his name to Lalo legally to simplify his contracts.

His father, Luis Schifrin, led the second violin section of the Buenos Aires Philharmonic for three decades. His father was Jewish and his mother Catholic, exposing him early to both kinds of worship. At the age of six, Schifrin began a six-year course of study on piano with Enrique Barenboim, the father of pianist and conductor Daniel Barenboim. Schifrin began studying piano with the Greek-Russian expatriate Andrea Karalin, the onetime head of the Kiev Conservatory and harmony with Juan Carlos Paz. During this time, Schifrin also became interested in jazz.

Although Schifrin studied sociology and law at the University of Buenos Aires, he became more interested in music. At the age of 20, he successfully applied for a scholarship to the Conservatoire de Paris where he studied from 1952, including with Olivier Messiaen and Charles Koechlin. He also studied African drumming. At night, he played jazz in Paris clubs. In 1955, Schifrin played piano with bandoneon player Ástor Piazzolla and represented his country at the International Jazz Festival in Paris.

=== 1956–1963: Jazz composer ===
After returning to Argentina in his twenties, Schifrin formed a jazz big band of 16 players that became part of a popular weekly variety show on Buenos Aires TV. He also began accepting film, television and radio assignments. In 1956, he met Dizzy Gillespie and offered to write an extended work for Gillespie's big band. Schifrin completed the work, Gillespiana, in 1958 and it was recorded in 1960.

While in New York City in 1960, Schifrin again met Gillespie, who had by this time disbanded his big band for financial reasons. Gillespie invited Schifrin to fill the vacant piano chair in his quintet. Schifrin immediately accepted and moved to New York City, as Gillespie's pianist and arranger. Schifrin wrote a second extended composition for Gillespie, The New Continent, which was recorded in 1962. On May 26, 1963, he recorded an album, Buenos Aires Blues, with Duke Ellington's alto saxophonist, Johnny Hodges. Schifrin wrote two compositions for the album; Dreary Blues and the title track B. A. Blues.

=== 1964–1989: Film composer ===
In 1963, Metro-Goldwyn-Mayer, which had Schifrin under contract, offered the composer his first Hollywood film assignment with the African adventure Rhino! Schifrin moved to Los Angeles. He became a naturalized US citizen in 1969.

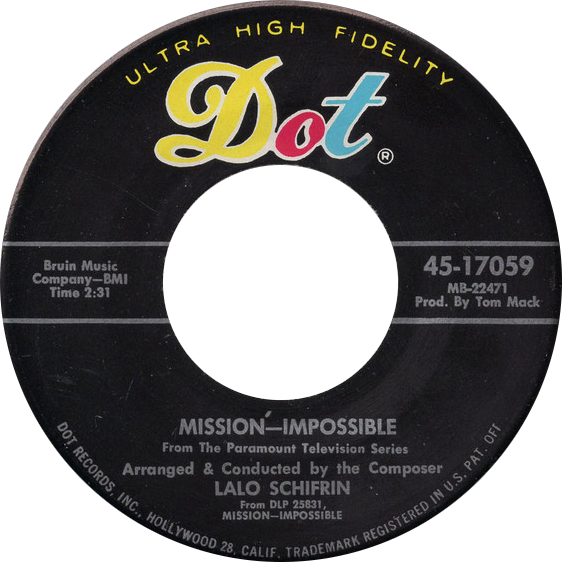
Record of Mission: Impossible theme

One of Schifrin's most recognizable and enduring compositions is the theme music for the long-running TV series Mission: Impossible that started in 1966. It is a distinctive tune written in the uncommon 5/4 time signature. The meter (dash dash, dot dot) is Morse code for the letters M and I. Similarly Schifrin's theme for the Mannix private eye TV show was composed in 1967 as a jazz waltz; Schifrin composed several other jazzy and bluesy numbers over the years as additional incidental music for the show.

Schifrin's "Tar Sequence" from his Cool Hand Luke score (written in 6/4) was the longtime theme for the Eyewitness News broadcasts on New York station WABC-TV and other ABC affiliates, as well as Nine News in Australia; it was used into the 1990s. CBS Television used part of the theme of his St. Ives soundtrack for its golf broadcasts in the 1970s and early 1980s. Schifrin's score for the 1968 film Coogan's Bluff was the beginning of a long association with Clint Eastwood and director Don Siegel. Schifrin's strong jazz-blues riffs were evident in Dirty Harry. The jazzy Bullitt score for this Peter Yates directed film was recorded in December of the same year. In 1973, he incorporated funk and traditional film score elements into soundtrack for the Bruce Lee film Enter the Dragon. He composed the score by sampling sounds from China, Korea, and Japan. The soundtrack has sold more than 500,000 copies, earning a gold record.

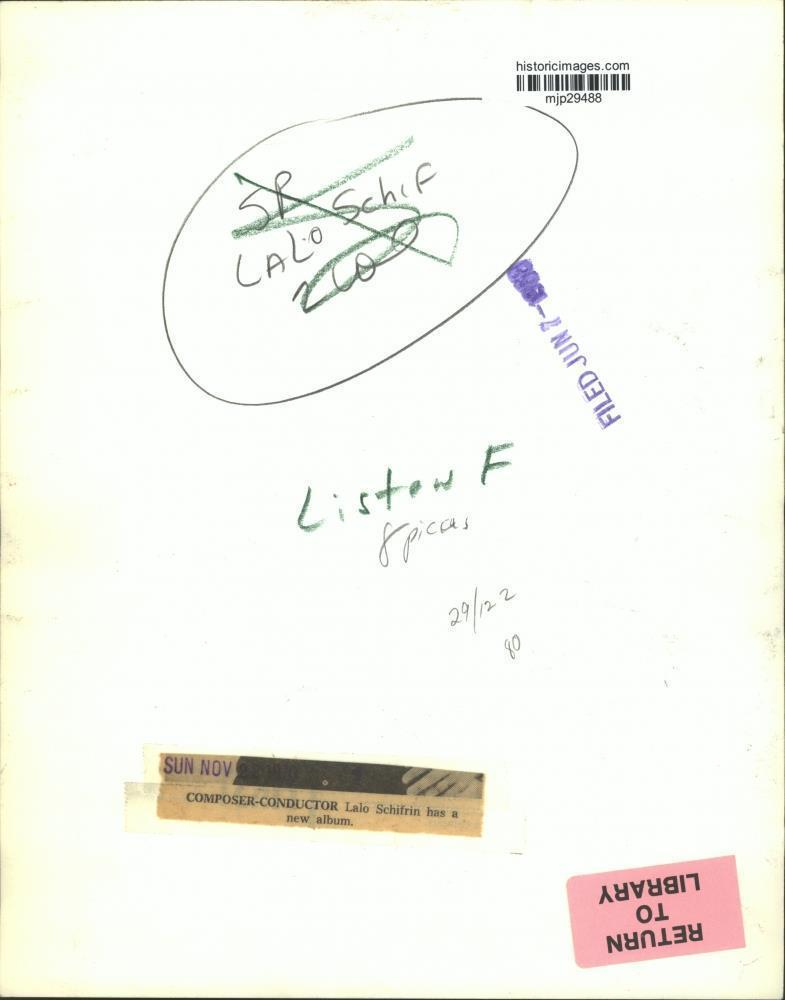
Schifrin in 1968

Schifrin's working score for 1973's The Exorcist was rejected by the film's director, William Friedkin. Schifrin had written six minutes of difficult and heavy music for the initial film trailer, but audiences were reportedly frightened by the combination of sights and sounds. As reported by Schifrin in an interview, Warner Bros. executives told Friedkin to instruct Schifrin to tone it down with softer music, but Friedkin did not relay the message. Schifrin said that working on the film was one of the most unpleasant experiences in his life. He later reused the compositions in other scores. In 1976, he released a single called "Jaws", a version of the John Williams theme from the Universal Pictures film Jaws, on CTI (Creed Taylor Incorporated) records. The single spent nine weeks on the UK chart, peaking at number 14.

Shifrin also composed the 1976 fanfare for Paramount Pictures, which was used mainly for their home video label and was adapted for the television division 11 years later until it was renamed to CBS Paramount Television (now CBS Studios) in 2006. In 1981, he wrote the music for the slapstick comedy film Caveman. From 1982 to 1995, he collaborated with Gary Stockdale on many films including The Osterman Weekend, Doctor Detroit, Sudden Impact, F/X2, Black Moon Rising, and Two Billion Hearts.

=== 1990–2025: Final years ===
In the 1990s, Schifrin wrote many of the arrangements for The Three Tenors concerts, beginning with their first concert in Rome in 1990 on the eve of the FIFA World Cup final. In the 1998 film Tango, he returned to tango music, with which he had grown familiar while working as Piazzolla's pianist in the mid-1950s. He brought traditional tango songs to the film, as well as introducing compositions of his own, in which tango is fused with jazz elements.

He founded Aleph Records in 1998. Schifrin made a cameo appearance in the 2002 film Red Dragon. He is widely sampled in hip-hop and trip-hop songs including Heltah Skeltah's "Prowl" and Portishead's "Sour Times". Both songs sample Schifrin's "Danube Incident", one of many themes he composed for specific episodes of the Mission: Impossible TV series. In 2003, Schifrin was commissioned to compose a classical work entitled Symphonic Impressions of Oman by Sultan Qaboos bin Said. In 2004, he wrote the main theme for Tom Clancy's Splinter Cell: Pandora Tomorrow, a stealth game published by Ubisoft.

On April 23, 2007, Schifrin presented a concert of film music for the Festival du Film Jules Verne Aventures (Festival Jules Verne), at Le Grand Rex theatre in Paris–Europe's biggest movie theater. It was recorded by festival leaders for a CD named Lalo Schifrin: Le Concert à Paris. In 2010, a fictionalized account of Lalo Schifrin's creation of the "Theme from Mission: Impossible" tune was featured in a Lipton TV commercial aired in a number of countries around the world.

After Rod Schejtman won the 2024 Vienna WorldVision Composers Contest, Schifrin in 2024 invited him to jointly compose a symphony dedicated to their country. They composed a 35-minute symphony in three movements, subtitled "Long Live Freedom", for an orchestra of nearly 100 musicians. Intending it as a tribute to Argentina, they drew inspiration from the nation's history over the past 40 years and fused cinematic and classical elements. The symphony premiered at the Teatro Colón on April 5, 2025.

== Personal life ==
Schifrin married Silvia Schon in Buenos Aires in 1958; they had two children The marriage ended in divorce. He married Donna Cockrell in 1971; they had a son. His second wife managed his business and record label.

In 2008 Schifrin wrote an autobiography, Mission Impossible: My Life in Music. He said:

In music, the choices are infinite. The possibilities of sound combinations with the acoustic instruments of a symphony orchestra, a jazz band or a chamber ensemble have not yet been exhausted. What has been done in the field of electronic music so far has not even scratched the surface of a vast continent to be explored.

=== Death ===
Schifrin died from complications of pneumonia at a hospital in Los Angeles, on June 26, 2025, at the age of 93.

== Works ==
=== Selected filmography ===
==== Film ====
- Rhino! (1964)
- The Making of a President (1964)
- The Cincinnati Kid (1965)
- Dark Intruder (1965)
- Way... Way Out (1966)
- Cool Hand Luke (1967)
- The Fox (1967)
- Bullitt (1968)
- Where Angels Go, Trouble Follows (1968)
- Che! (1969)
- Kelly's Heroes (1970)
- Dirty Harry (1971)
- The Beguiled (1971)
- THX 1138 (1971)
- Joe Kidd (1972)
- Enter the Dragon (1973)
- Magnum Force (1973)
- The Eagle Has Landed (1976)
- Voyage of the Damned (1976)
- Rollercoaster (1977)
- The Amityville Horror (1979)
- The Competition (1980)
- Amityville II: The Possession (1982)
- Sudden Impact (1983)
- The Sting II (1983)
- Black Moon Rising (1986)
- The Dead Pool (1988)
- Rush Hour (1998)
- Tango (1998)
- Rush Hour 2 (2001)
- Bringing Down the House (2003)
- After the Sunset (2004)
- Rush Hour 3 (2007)

==== Television ====
- 1965: The Man from U.N.C.L.E.
- 1966: Mission: Impossible
- 1966: T.H.E. Cat (TV series)
- 1967: Mannix
- 1968: Braddock - Premiere (TV series)
- 1969: Medical Center
- 1974: Planet of the Apes
- 1975: Starsky & Hutch
- 1976: Most Wanted
- 1982: Chicago Story
- 1984: Glitter
- 1987: Sparky's Magic Piano
- 1988: Mission: Impossible (revival)

=== Video game ===
- 2004: Tom Clancy's Splinter Cell: Pandora Tomorrow (main theme only)

== Awards and nominations ==
Schifrin won five Grammy Awards (four Grammy Awards and a Latin Grammy), with twenty-two nominations, one CableACE Award and received six Academy Award and four Primetime Emmy Award nominations. He has a star on the Hollywood Walk of Fame. In 2016, it was announced that his Mission: Impossible theme was to be inducted into the Grammy Award Hall of Fame. In 2018, Clint Eastwood presented him with an Academy Honorary Award "in recognition of his unique musical style, compositional integrity and influential contributions to the art of film scoring."

Award	Year	Category	Work	Result	Ref.
Academy Awards	1967	Best Original Score	Cool Hand Luke	Nominated	
Academy Awards	1968	Best Original Score	The Fox	Nominated	
Academy Awards	1976	Best Original Score	Voyage of the Damned	Nominated	
Academy Awards	1979	Best Original Score	The Amityville Horror	Nominated	
Academy Awards	1980	Best Original Song	"People Alone" (from The Competition)	Nominated	
Academy Awards	1983	Best Original Score	The Sting II	Nominated	
Academy Awards	2018	Academy Honorary Award		Honored	
Golden Globe Awards	1976	Best Original Score	Voyage of the Damned	Nominated	
Golden Globe Awards	1979	Best Original Score	The Amityville Horror	Nominated	
Golden Globe Awards	1980	Best Original Score	The Competition	Nominated	
Primetime Emmy Awards	1966	Outstanding Achievement in Music Composition	The Making of a President: 1964	Nominated	
Primetime Emmy Awards	1967	Outstanding Achievement in Music Composition	Mission: Impossible	Nominated	
Primetime Emmy Awards	1968	Outstanding Achievement in Music Composition	Mission: Impossible (Episode: "The Seal")	Nominated	
Primetime Emmy Awards	1969	Outstanding Achievement in Music Composition	Mission: Impossible (Episode: "The Heir Apparent")	Nominated	
Grammy Awards	1962	Best Original Jazz Composition	Gillespiana	Nominated	
Grammy Awards	1963	Best Original Jazz Composition	Tunisian Fantasy	Nominated	
Grammy Awards	1965	Best Original Jazz Composition	"The Cat" (from Joy House)	Won	
Grammy Awards	1966	Best Original Jazz Composition	Jazz Suite on the Mass Texts	Won	
Grammy Awards	1966	Best Score Soundtrack for Visual Media	The Man from U.N.C.L.E.	Nominated	
Grammy Awards	1967	Best Original Jazz Composition	Marquis De Sade	Nominated	
Grammy Awards	1968	Best Instrumental Performance	Theme from Mission: Impossible	Nominated	
Grammy Awards	1968	Best Instrumental Composition	Theme from Mission: Impossible	Won	
Grammy Awards	1968	Best Score Soundtrack for Visual Media	Mission: Impossible	Won	
Grammy Awards	1969	Best Theme Composition	Theme from The Fox	Nominated	
Grammy Awards	1969	Best Score Soundtrack for Visual Media	The Fox	Nominated	
Grammy Awards	1971	Best Instrumental Composition	Theme from Medical Center	Nominated	
Grammy Awards	1971	Best Instrumental Arrangement	Theme from Medical Center	Nominated	
Grammy Awards	1994	Best Instrumental Arrangement	Dizzy Gillespie Fireworks	Nominated	
Grammy Awards	1997	Best Instrumental Arrangement	Charlie Parker: The Firebird (Medley)	Nominated	
Grammy Awards	1997	Best Pop Instrumental Performance	Theme from Mission: Impossible	Nominated	
Grammy Awards	1999	Best Score Soundtrack for Visual Media	Rush Hour	Nominated	
Grammy Awards	2000	Best Instrumental Arrangement	Fiesta	Nominated	
Grammy Awards	2002	Best Instrumental Arrangement	Scheherazade Fantasy	Nominated	
Latin Grammy Award	2000	Best Latin Jazz Album	Latin Jazz Suite	Nominated	
Latin Grammy Award	2006	Best Tango Album	Letters from Argentina	Nominated	
Latin Grammy Award	2010	Best Classical Contemporary Composition	Pampas	Won	
Latin Grammy Award	2011	Best Classical Contemporary Composition	Romerías	Nominated	
