= Best of Live (Last Exit album) =

Compilation album by Last Exit
- Released: 1990
- Genre: Free jazz
- Length: 70:04
- Label: Enemy
- Producer: Last Exit

Last Exit chronology
Iron Path (1988)	Best of Live (1990)	Köln (1990)

Best of Live is a compilation album by the free jazz group Last Exit, it was released in 1990 by Enemy Records.

== Track listing ==
No.	Title	Writer(s)	Album (date)	Length
1.	"Enemy Within"	Brötzmann, Jackson, Laswell, Sharrock	Last Exit (1986)	3:48
2.	"Pig Freedom"	Brötzmann, Jackson, Laswell, Sharrock	Last Exit (1986)	4:04
3.	"Discharge"	Brötzmann, Jackson, Laswell, Sharrock	Last Exit (1986)	3:25
4.	"Red Light"	Brötzmann, Jackson, Laswell, Sharrock	Last Exit (1986)	7:58
5.	"Panzer Be-Bop"	Brötzmann, Jackson, Laswell, Sharrock	The Noise of Trouble (1986)	9:02
6.	"Blind Willie"	Sharrock	The Noise of Trouble (1986)	6:23
7.	"Help Me Mo, I'm Blind"	Brötzmann, Hancock, Jackson, Laswell, Sharrock	The Noise of Trouble (1986)	7:17
8.	"Ma Rainey"	Brötzmann, Jackson, Laswell, Sharrock	Cassette Recordings '87 (1987)	5:10
9.	"My Balls/Your Chin"	Brötzmann, Jackson, Laswell, Sharrock	Cassette Recordings '87 (1987)	2:30
10.	"Line of Fire"	Brötzmann, Jackson, Laswell, Sharrock	Cassette Recordings '87 (1987)	20:27

== Personnel ==
Last Exit

- Peter Brötzmann – baritone saxophone, tenor saxophone, tárogató
- Ronald Shannon Jackson – drums, voice
- Bill Laswell – Fender 6-string bass
- Sonny Sharrock – guitar

Additional musicians

- Herbie Hancock – piano (7)

Technical personnel

- Last Exit – producer

== Release history ==
Region	Date	Label	Format	Catalog
Germany	1990	Enemy	CD	EMCD 110
