= JCF =

JCF may refer to:

- Code of G. Robert Cotton Correctional Facility, a Michigan state prison
- Jaguar Conservation Fund
- Jamaica Constabulary Force, police
- James Caan Foundation
- Japan Chernobyl Foundation, a Japanese NPO
- Japan Cycling Federation
- A series of Victorian Railways hopper wagons
- Jordan canonical form of a matrix in mathematics
- Joseph Campbell Foundation, US
- Juan Carlos Ferrero, Spanish former tennis player and coach
