= Strength in Numbers (24-7 Spyz album) =

Studio album by 24-7 Spyz
- Released: July 7, 1992
- Genre: Hard rock
- Label: East West
- Producer: Terry Date

24-7 Spyz chronology
Gumbo Millennium (1990)	Strength in Numbers (1992)	Temporarily Disconnected (1995)

Professional ratings
Review scores
Source	Rating
AllMusic	2.5/5 stars

Strength in Numbers is the third studio album by American rock band 24-7 Spyz, released on July 7, 1992, by East West Records. It is the band's only album to feature Jeff Brodnax, who replaced original vocalist P. Fluid in 1991. On their third effort, the Spyz concentrate on simpler and more direct songwriting.

The Seattle grunge movement overpowered the music industry in 1992, leaving the Spyz without a record contract or media attention in the midst of their creative peak.

After the release of the album, the Spyz would take a break before reforming their classic lineup in 1995.

Like many 24-7 Spyz albums, this recording is out of print, but this album is available on streaming platforms.

== Musical style ==
Musically, Strength in Numbers has been described as a hard rock album with elements of metal, funk, New York hardcore, R&B, jazz, and reggae.

== Track listing ==
1. "Break the Chains"
2. "Crime Story"
3. "Judgment Day"
4. "Understanding"
5. "Got It Goin' On"
6. "My Desire"
7. "Purple"
8. "Stuntman"
9. "Earth and Sky"
10. "Room #9"
11. "Sireality"
12. "Last Call"
13. "I'm Not Going"
14. "Traveling Day"

== Personnel ==
- Jeff Brodnax – vocals
- Jimi Hazel – guitar
- Rick Skatore – bass
- Joel Maitoza – drums
