= If I Could =

If I Could may refer to:

- If I Could (album), 1993 album by jazz saxophonist Stanley Turrentine
- If I Could (EP), by 24-7 Spyz
- "If I Could" (1927 song), a song by 1927 from the album ...Ish
- "If I Could" (24-7 Spyz song), from the EP If I Could
- "If I Could" (Calaisa song), a 2008 Calaisa song
- "If I Could" (Wiley song), by Wiley featuring Ed Sheeran
- ""El Condor Pasa (If I Could)" a version by Simon & Garfunkel of a song written by Daniel Alomía Robles
- "If I Could", a song by Lou Barlow from the album Emoh
- "If I Could", a song by Regina Belle from the album Passion
- "If I Could", a song by Blue Merle from Burning In The Sun
- "If I Could", a song written by Tim Carroll, on John Prine's Live on Tour album
- "If I Could", a song by Cheap Trick from the album Special One
- "If I Could", a song by Daddy X from the album Family Ties
- "If I Could", a song by Darius Danesh from the album Live Twice
- "If I Could", a song by DJ Tatana from the album Peace and Love
- "If I Could", a song by Erasure from the album The Circus
- "If I Could", a single by David Essex from Greatest Hits
- "If I Could", a song by Five Americans from the album Western Union
- "If I Could", a song by Gabrielle from the album Gabrielle
- "If I Could", a song by Peter Hammill from the album The Future Now
- "If I Could", a song written by Ken Hirsch, Ron Miller and Marti Sharron
- "If I Could", a single by Hometown News from Hometown News 2004
- "If I Could", a song by Hundred Reasons from the album Ideas Above Our Station
- "If I Could", a single by Joée from Truth 1998
- "If I Could", a song by Jack Johnson from the album In Between Dreams
- "If I Could", a song by Just a Band from the album Scratch to Reveal
- "If I Could", a song by Gordon Lightfoot from the album Back Here on Earth
- "If I Could", a song by Mineral from the album The Power of Failing
- "If I Could", a song by the Pat Metheny Group from the album First Circle
- "If I Could", a song by Phish from the album Hoist
- "If I Could", a song by Project Pitchfork from the album Dream, Tiresias!
- "If I Could", a song by Seal from the album Seal (1994 album)
- "If I Could", a song by State of Shock from the album Guilty by Association
- "If I Could", a song by Stellar from the album Magic Line
- "If I Could", a song by Tech N9ne from the album All 6's and 7's
- "If I Could", a song by The Yeah You's from the album Looking Through You
- "Andai Aku Bisa" ("If I Could"), a song by Chrisye from the album Konser Tur 2001
- "Eh Da Mozam" ("If I Could"), a song by Lambe Alabakoski
- "If I Could (What I Would Do)", a song by Vanessa Daou from the album Slow to Burn
