= Temporarily Disconnected =

Studio album by 24-7 Spyz
- Released: 1995
- Genre: Heavy metal; funk; soul
- Label: Enemy

24-7 Spyz chronology
Strength in Numbers (1992)	Temporarily Disconnected (1995)	Heavy Metal Soul by the Pound (1996)

Professional ratings
Review scores
Source	Rating
AllMusic	2.5/5 stars

Temporarily Disconnected is the fourth album by the American band 24-7 Spyz, released in 1995. It features the reunion of the band's classic lineup, including mainstays Jimi Hazel and Rick Skatore along with the return of vocalist P. Fluid (now using his proper last name, Forrest) and drummer Anthony Johnson. The reunion and subsequent album were based on the lingering popularity of this particular lineup in Europe (where it was released exclusively) following the breakup of Strength in Numbers lineup.

The sound of Temporarily Disconnected mixes soul, funk, jazz, and heavy metal.

The album was seen by many critics, fans and even some band members as a step backwards from the focused effort of Strength in Numbers. Once again, problems between P. Fluid and the rest of the band came to a head following a 1995 European tour, with Fluid and Johnson exiting the band again shortly thereafter.

== Track listing ==
All songs written by P. Fluid, except for where noted.

1. "Dogs Come Out" - 2:27
2. "Outta Mind, Outta Time" (Jimi Hazel) - 3:42
3. "Fire & Water" - 1:54
4. "Why?" (Hazel) - 3:57
5. "Body Thief" - 3:33
6. "Choose Me" (Rick Skatore) - 4:41
7. "Heart of Fire" (Skatore) - 6:05
8. "Stoner" - 5:55
9. "Boots" - 3:23
10. "Agroovendeel" (Hazel) - 4:26
11. "Choose Me ("For Those Who Like It Rough in the Middle" Remix)" (Skatore) - 4:43

== Personnel ==
- P. Fluid (credited as Forrest): vocals
- Jimi Hazel: guitar
- Rick Skatore: bass
- Anthony Johnson: drums
