= The Devil's Rain =

The Devil's Rain may refer to:

- The Devil's Rain (film), a 1975 horror film directed by Robert Fuest
- The Devil's Rain (album) or the title song, by the Misfits, 2011
- Devil's Rain, a 1977 musical composition by Thomas Albert
- "Devil's Rain", a song by Last Exit from Iron Path
- A sunshower, a weather phenomenon often associated with the devil
