= Enemy Records =

- Founded: 1986
- Founder: Michael Knuth, Bill Laswell
- Country of origin: Germany, United States
- Location: Munich, Brooklyn

Enemy Records is an independent record label based in Brooklyn, New York and Munich, Germany, founded in 1986. Its debut was the free jazz album Last Exit by the band of the same name.

== History ==
The label was founded in 1986 by music enthusiast Michael Knuth and composer Bill Laswell. Eventually the two parted ways, with Knuth retaining sole distribution rights. The label primarily focused on issuing records by artists who were influenced by jazz and experimental music. It served as an outlet for musical acts such as Gary Lucas, Sonny Sharrock, Last Exit, 24-7 Spyz, Crash Worship and Universal Congress Of.

== Discography ==
Enemy Records released 60 albums between 1986 and 1996

| Catalog | Artist | Album |
|---|---|---|
| EMY 101 | Last Exit | Last Exit |
| EMY 102 | Sonny Sharrock | Guitar |
| EMY 103 | Last Exit | The Noise of Trouble: Live in Tokyo |
| EMY 104 | Sonny Sharrock Band | Seize the Rainbow |
| EMY 105 | Last Exit | Cassette Recordings '87 |
| EMY 106 | SXL | Into the Outlands |
| EMY 107 | Blind Idiot God | Undertow |
| EMY 108 | Sonny Sharrock | Live in New York |
| EMY 109 | Friction | Replicant Walk |
| EMY 110 | Last Exit | Best of Live |
| EMY 111 | Various Artists | Live at the Knitting Factory Volume One |
| EMY 112 | Various Artists | Live at the Knitting Factory Volume Two |
| EMY 113 | Various Artists | Live at the Knitting Factory Volume Three |
| EMY 114 | Bachir Attar with Elliott Sharp | In New York |
| EMY 115 | Myra Melford Trio | Jump |
| EMY 116 | Elliott Sharp / Carbon | Datacide |
| EMY 117 | Universal Congress Of | The Sad and Tragic Demise of Big Fine Hot Salty Black Wind |
| EMY 118 | Various Artists | Live at the Knitting Factory Volume 4 |
| EMY 119 | Sonny Sharrock | Highlife |
| EMY 120 | | |
| EMY 121 | Various Artists | Knitting Factory Tours Europe 1991 |
| EMY 122 | Defunkt | Live at the Knitting Factory NYC |
| EMY 123 | | |
| EMY 124 | | |
| EMY 125 | The Jazz Passengers | Live at the Knitting Factory |
| EMY 126 | Gary Lucas | Skeleton at the Feast |
| EMY 127 | Jean-Paul Bourelly | Trippin' |
| EMY 128 | Jungle Pilots | Near-Miss |
| EMY 129 | John King / Electric World | Hot Thumb in a Funky Groove |
| EMY 130 | Kelvynator | Refunkanation |
| EMY 131 | Myra Melford Trio | Now & Now |
| EMY 132 | David Lopato | Inside Outside |
| EMY 133 | Gary Lucas | Gods and Monsters |
| EMY 134 | Elliott Sharp / Carbon | Tocsin |
| EMY 135 | Defunkt | Crisis |
| EMY 136 | Universal Congress Of | The Eleventh-Hour Shine-On |
| EMY 137 | Manu Dibango | Afrijazzy |
| EMY 138 | Liquid Hips | Fool Injection |
| EMY 139 | Various Artists | Know Your Enemy |
| EMY 140 | Defunkt | Cum Funky |
| EMY 141 | The Killer Shrews | The Killer Shrews |
| EMY 142 | Liquid Hips | Static |
| EMY 143 | Royal Crescent Mob | Good Lucky Killer |
| EMY 144 | Defunkt | Cum Funky [Limited Edition Bonus Tracks] |
| EMY 145 | Defunkt | Live & Reunified |
| EMY 146 | Gary Lucas | Bad Boys of the Arctic |
| EMY 147 | Joe Baiza, Rafa Gorodetksy and Tony Cicero | Mecolodiacs |
| EMY 148 | Defunkt Special Edition | A Blues Tribute - Jimi Hendrix & Muddy Waters |
| EMY 149 | Cyclone Temple | My Friend Lonely |
| EMY 150 | 24-7 Spyz | Temporarily Disconnected |
| EMY 151 | Crash Worship | Triple Mania II |
| EMY 152 | Ed Hall | La La Land |
| EMY 153 | H.P. Zinker | Mountains of Madness |
| EMY 154 | Liquid Hips | Rageaholic |
| EMY 155 | 24-7 Spyz | 6 |
| EMY 156 | Sonny Sharrock | Into Another Light [Compilation] |
| EMY 157 | James Chance and the Contortions | Molotov Cocktail Lounge |
| EMY 158 | Belizbeha | Charlie's Dream |
| EMY 159 | Mars | Psycore |
| EMY 160 | RinneRadio | Rok |
