= Harder Than You =

Studio album by 24-7 Spyz
- Released: 1989
- Recorded: December 1988
- Studios: Platinum Island, New York City, New York
- Genres: Hardcore punk; funk; heavy metal; rap; reggae
- Length: 41:20
- Label: In-Effect
- Producers: Robert Musso; Jimi Hazel

24-7 Spyz chronology
Harder Than You (1989)	Gumbo Millennium (1990)

Harder Than You is the debut album by 24-7 Spyz. It was released in 1989 via In-Effect. The album contains elements of several genres. The group flirts with polka on "Tango Skin Polka," introspective political reggae on "Ballots Not Bullets," and speed metal with "Spill My Guts."

The band made a video for MTV for their cover of Kool & the Gang's "Jungle Boogie." The song was remixed into a dance version with extended electronic instrumental passages, and was popular on the club circuit.

Like many 24-7 Spyz albums, the recording is out of print.

== Critical reception ==
Professional ratings
Review scores
Source	Rating
AllMusic	4.5/5 stars
Chicago Tribune	4/4 stars
The Encyclopedia of Popular Music	4/5 stars
The Rolling Stone Album Guide	2.5/5 stars

Trouser Press wrote that the band "mixes and matches hardcore punk and tough-minded funk on Harder Than You to achieve a singularly potent blend ... It’s the band’s freewheeling sense of fun that makes [the album] such a visceral joy." The Orlando Sentinel deemed the album "rock-ska-punk-funk-soul-reggae-hip/hop-metal-jazz-polka core." The Encyclopedia of Popular Music praised the "stunning performances from the Jimi Hendrix-worshipping Hazel and the energetic Fluid."

== Track listing ==
1. "Grandma Dynamite" - 3:45 (Fluid/Hazel)
2. "Jimi'z Jam" - 2:25 (Hazel)
3. "Spyz Dope" - 2:50 (Fluid)
4. "Social Plague" - 4:41 (Skatore)
5. "I Must Go On" - 3:01 (Fluid)
6. "Ballots Not Bullets" - 4:24 (Fluid)
7. "Jungle Boogie" - 3:37 (Fluid/Kool & the Gang/Puelm)
8. "Spill My Guts" - 3:37 (Fluid/Skatore/Hazel)
9. "Sponji Reggae" - 3:53 (Rose)
10. "Tango Skin Polka" - 1:28 (Fluid/Hazel)
11. "Pillage" - 4:40 (Fluid/Hazel)
12. "New Drug" - 2:55 (Fluid)

== Personnel ==
- Rick Skatore – Bass, Vocals (TV Repairman)
- Anthony Johnson – Drums (Electrician)
- P. Fluid – Thoughtman (Plumber)
- Jimi Hazel – Guitars, Vocals (Carpenter)
