= Minoru Kamata =

Japanese physician (born 1948)

- Born: June 28, 1948 (age 78); Suginami-ku, Tokyo, Japan
- Organization: Japan Chernobyl Foundation

Minoru Kamata (鎌田 實 Kamata Minoru, born June 28, 1948) is a Japanese physician, writer, and humanitarian. Throughout his medical career he has been an advocate of patient-centered care, and he has also been actively involved in international medical and humanitarian aid. As a founding member of the Japan Chernobyl Foundation, Kamata has been particularly active in promoting medical aid programs for victims of the Chernobyl disaster, and subsequently for victims of other international and domestic disasters and conflicts. His book Gambaranai, which became a best seller in Japan in 2000, was dramatized for Japanese television. Kamata has been the recipient of numerous awards for his contributions to medicine, publishing and broadcasting, as well as for his overseas aid work and peace efforts.

== Life and work ==
Minoru Kamata was born in Suginami-ku, Tokyo, Japan, on June 28, 1948. Following graduation from Tokyo Metropolitan Nishi High School, he entered Tokyo Medical and Dental University. Upon completion of his medical studies in 1974, he joined the staff of Suwa Central Hospital in Chino, Nagano Prefecture, Japan, as a general practitioner, and in 1988 was appointed hospital director. Kamata has been a longtime advocate of community- and patient-centered health care, and of improved medical care for terminally ill patients. In 1991, in the wake of the Chernobyl Nuclear Power Plant accident, he helped establish the Japan Chernobyl Foundation (JCF), a non-profit organization dedicated to providing medical care to children with leukemia, thyroid cancer, and other radiation-related illnesses. On behalf of JCF, Kamata has made numerous visits to the radioactive contamination zone in the Republic of Belarus to provide clinical aid and deliver medicine.

His book Gambaranai, a series of essays drawing on personal interactions with patients and their families, became a best seller in Japan, and the following year the book was adapted by the Tokyo Broadcasting System (TBS) as a television drama, starring Toshiyuki Nishida.

From 2003 to 2013, Kamata hosted a regular radio program on the NHK (Nippon Hōsō Kyōkai, or Japan Broadcasting Corporation) station NHK Radio 1. The program, Kamata Minoru no Inochi no Taiwa (Minoru Kamata’s Dialog about Life), featured conversations about doctor-patient interaction.

In 2004, through the then newly formed Japan Iraq Medical Network (JIM-NET), Kamata helped initiate Japanese medical support to Iraq. The group has provided medical supplies to five children's hospitals in Iraq, offered medical examinations in refugee camps, and contributed to the advancement of pediatric cancer research in the region.

Kamata was appointed Director Emeritus of the Suwa Central Hospital in 2005.

In 2006, he set up his own record label, Gambaranai, which has released such albums as Himawari (Sunflower), by Japanese jazz saxophonist Akira Sakata (坂田 明 Sakata Akira), as well as Furusato – Puragu no Haru (Hometown: Spring in Prague), by the Czech cellist Vladan Kočí. All profits from the sales of CDs have been used to support relief efforts in Iraq, Chernobyl, and the disaster-hit Tohoku region of Japan.

In 2010, after reading a newspaper article about the tragic shooting death of a young Palestinian boy, Kamata decided to write a book about the incident. The resulting Japanese-language work, Ahamedokun no Inochi no Rirei, has since been translated into English as Ahmed's Relay of Life, and also into Arabic and Hebrew. During subsequent travels to the Middle East, Kamata has reportedly handed out copies of the book in order to encourage discussions about peace.

Kamata has been the recipient of numerous honours and awards, including the Shinano Mainichi Shimbun Prize (1994), the Peace & Cooperative Journalist Fund Honorable Award (2000), the Order of Francysk Skaryna from the Republic of Belarus (2001), the Takashi Nagai Memorial Nagasaki Peace Award (2004), Yomiuri International Cooperation Prize (2006), the Best Father Yellow Ribbon Award (2009), the Japan Broadcasting Corporation Broadcast Culture Prize (2011), and the Cultural Award of Japan Broadcasting Corporation, NHK (2011).

In 2015 Kamata serves as chairman of the Japan Chernobyl Foundation (JCF), clinical professor at Tokyo Medical and Dental University School of Medicine, clinical professor at Tokai University School of Medicine, and official representative of the Japan-Iraq Medical Network (JIM-NET). He can also be heard weekly on the Nippon Cultural Broadcasting radio program Nichiyōbi wa Gambaranai, in which he continues to explore the ideas about community- and patient-centered health raised in his many published works.

== Books ==
- 『がんばらない』 Gambaranai (2000) ISBN 9784087475890
- 『命があぶない医療があぶない』 Inochi ga Abunai, Iryō ga Abunai (2001) ISBN 9784263232552
- 『あきらめない』 Akiramenai (2003) ISBN 9784087460445
- 『病院なんか嫌いだ―』 Iin Nanka Kirai Da (2003) ISBN 9784087202144
- 『いのちの対話』 Inochi no Taiwa (2004) ISBN 9784087813159
- 『患者が主役―命によりそう医療』 Kanja ga Shuuyaku: Inochi niyori Sōiryō, (2004) ISBN 9784141891062
- 『雪とパイナップル』 Yuki to Painappuru (2004) ISBN 9784087813074
- 『それでもやっぱりがんばらない 』 Soredemo Yappari Gambaranai (2005) ISBN 9784087462654
- 『いのちとユーモア―鎌田實と11人の対話』 Inochi to Yūmoa: Kamata Minoru to Jūichinin to Taiwa (2006) ISBN 9784087753578
- 『増補決定版 がんに負けない、あきらめないコツ』 Gan ni Makanai, Akiramenai Kotsu (2006) ISBN 9784022617170
- 『この国が好き』 Kono Kuni ga Suki (2006) ISBN 9784838716722
- 『ちょい太でだいじょうぶ―メタボリックシンドロームにならないコツ』 Choifuto Daijoubu Metaborikku Shindoromu ni Naranai Kotsu (2006) ISBN 9784087813494
- 『鎌田實のしあわせ介護』 Kamata Minoru no Shiawase Kaigo (2007) ISBN 9784805830000
- 『幸せさがし』 Shiawase Sagashi (2007) ISBN 9784022502964
- 『旅、あきらめない~高齢でも、障がいがあっても』 Tabi, Akiramenai Korei Demo, Shougai ga Attemo (2007) ISBN 9784062136563
- 『超ホスピタリティ』 Chou Hosupitaritii (2007) ISBN 9784569690865
- 『いいかげんがいい』 Iikagen ga Ii (2008) ISBN 9784087814057
- 『なげださない 』 Nagedasanai (2008) ISBN 9784087466980
- 『がんばらない健康法』 Ganbaranai Kenkōhō (2009) ISBN 9784255004754
- 『言葉で治療する』 Kotoba de Chiryō suru (2009) ISBN 9784022506641
- 『へこたれない』 Hekotarenai (2009) ISBN 9784569708171
- 『ウエットな資本主義』 Uettona Shihonshugi (2010) ISBN 9784532260798
- 『空気は読まない』 Kūki wa Yomanai (2010) ISBN 9784087814354
- 『この道より道まわり道』 Kono Michi yori Michi Mawarimichi (2010) ISBN 9784267018572
- 『人は一瞬で変われる』 Hito wa Isshun de Kawareru (2010) ISBN 9784087814460
- 『よくばらない』 Yokubaranai (2010) ISBN 9784569777191
- 『アハメドくんのいのちのリレー』 Ahamedokun no Inochi no Rirei (2011) ISBN 9784087814712
- 『「がんばらない」を生きる』 Gambaranai wo Ikiru (2011) ISBN 9784120043048
- 『チェルノブイリ・フクシマ、なさけないけどあきらめない 』 Cherunobuiri/Fukushima: Nasakenai kedo Akiramenai (2011) ISBN 9784023309661
- 『たった１つ変わればうまくいく』 Tatta Hitotsu Kawareba Umaku Iku (2011) ISBN 9784087467659
- 『ニッポンを幸せにする会社』 Nippon wo Shiawase ni suru Shakai (2012) ISBN 9784087814958
- 『がまんしなくていい』 Gaman Shinakute ii (2013) ISBN 9784087815221
- 『鎌田式健康ごはん』 Kamata-shiki Kenkō Gohan (2013) ISBN 9784838788187
- 『大・大往生』 Dai-daiōjō (2013) ISBN 9784093798464
