= If I Could (EP) =

EP by 24-7 Spyz
- Released: 1997
- Recorded: 1996–1997
- Genre: Rock

24-7 Spyz chronology
Heavy Metal Soul by the Pound (1996)	If I Could (1997)	Can You Hear the Sound? (2006)

If I Could is an EP released by 24-7 Spyz in 1997. It features album cuts from their 1996 full-length release Heavy Metal Soul by the Pound as well as several live tracks recorded in early 1996 with Joel Maitoza on drums.

Like many 24-7 Spyz albums, the recording is out of print.

== Track listing ==
1. "If I Could" (remix)
2. "If I Could"
3. "Along Comes Mary"
4. "New Super Hero Worship" (live)
5. "Room #9" (live)
6. "Love & Peace" (live)
7. "Tick, Tick, Tick" (live)
8. "Stuntman" (live)

== Personnel ==
- Jimi Hazel: guitar, vocals
- Rick Skatore: bass, vocals
- Joel Maitoza: drums
