= Köln (Last Exit album) =

Live album by Last Exit
- Released: 1990
- Recorded: February 1986 at Alter Wartesaal, Köln
- Genre: Free jazz
- Length: 38:00
- Label: ITM
- Producer: Last Exit

Last Exit chronology
Best of Live (1990)	Köln (1990)	Headfirst into the Flames (1993)

Köln is the fourth live album by the free jazz group Last Exit, released in 1990 by ITM Records.

== Reception ==
Professional ratings
Review scores
Source	Rating
AllMusic	4/5 stars
The Penguin Guide to Jazz	3.5/4 stars

In a review for AllMusic, John Dougan wrote: "Another live set from the 1986 tour, Köln could well be the best of the bunch... the record's release was postponed for a couple of years. But man, was it ever worth the wait. Open up and burn."

Writing for Trouser Press, Greg Kot stated: "Sharrock has said he first met Jackson on the way to the group's first concert a few days before, and the lack of rehearsal brings spontaneity, energy and a palpable tension to the group interaction. The nineteen minutes of 'Hard School' are as harrowing as they are unrelenting, with Brötzmann, goaded by Jackson, coming out screaming and later inciting Sharrock to join in the carnage."

In a 2005 review for All About Jazz, John Eyles commented: "It is incredible to think that these recordings were made some twenty years ago; this music has a timeless quality and its influence has been immense in the decades since it was recorded, on groups like Napalm Death, Naked City, Aufgehoben No Process, and others. Last Exit remains as in your face and impossible to ignore as ever."

== Track listing ==
All music is composed by Peter Brötzmann, Ronald Shannon Jackson, Bill Laswell, Sonny Sharrock, except "Brain Damage" by Ronald Shannon Jackson.

No.	Title	Length
1.	"Hard School"	18:28
2.	"Brain Damage"	6:04
3.	"Taking a Beating"	2:50
4.	"Last Call"	4:17
5.	"Dark Heart"	6:21

== Personnel ==
Last Exit

- Peter Brötzmann – tenor saxophone, cover art
- Ronald Shannon Jackson – drums, voice
- Bill Laswell – Fender 6-string bass
- Sonny Sharrock – guitar

Technical personnel

- Last Exit – producer
- Robert Musso – mixing
- Howie Weinberg – mastering

== Release history ==
Region	Date	Label	Format	Catalog
Germany	1990	ITM	CD	ITM 1446
Japan	1995	Atavistic	CD	ALP252CD
