= Headfirst into the Flames: Live in Europe =

Live album by Last Exit
- Released: 1993
- Recorded: 1989 in Stockholm, Sweden and Munich, Germany
- Genre: Free jazz
- Length: 63:03
- Label: MuWorks
- Producer: Robert Musso

Last Exit chronology
Köln (1990)	Headfirst into the Flames: Live in Europe (1993)

Headfirst into the Flames: Live in Europe is the fifth live album by the free jazz group Last Exit, released in 1993 by MuWorks Records.

== Reception ==
Professional ratings
Review scores
Source	Rating
AllMusic	3/5 stars

In a review for AllMusic, John Dougan wrote: "Headfirst kicks off with the brain fry of 'Lizard Eyes' only to launch into a Sharrock improv called 'Don't Be a Cry Baby, Whatever You Do.' Brotzmann blows wild and free here, and his squeal and blurt provides a great counterpoint to the rumble of the rhythms and the pummeling sonic overload of Sharrock's guitar. Another piece of blurt that will make you head spin."

Writing for Trouser Press, Greg Kot stated: "While cutthroat power is still very much part of the group's repertoire, the emphasis is more on give-and-take... 'Jesus! What Gorgeous Monkeys We Are' simmers rather than boils for all of its eleven minutes, a four-way conversation of the type rarely heard on the earlier albums."

== Track listing ==
All music is composed by Peter Brötzmann, Ronald Shannon Jackson, Bill Laswell, Sonny Sharrock.

No.	Title	Length
1.	"Lizard Eyes"	5:43
2.	"Don't Be a Cry Baby, Whatever You Do"	6:37
3.	"So Small, So Weak, This Body Sweat of Loving"	4:37
4.	"Headfirst into the Flames"	3:11
5.	"A Knight of Ghosts and Shadows"	6:18
6.	"Jesus! What Gorgeous Monkeys We Are"	10:52
7.	"Hanged Men Are Always Naked"	10:05
8.	"No One Knows Anything"	5:22
9.	"I Must Confess I'm a Cannibal"	10:18

== Accolades ==
Publication	Country	Accolade	Year	Rank
The Wire	United Kingdom	Albums of the Year	1993	17

== Personnel ==
Last Exit

- Peter Brötzmann – bass saxophone, cover art
- Ronald Shannon Jackson – drums
- Bill Laswell – Fender 6-string bass
- Sonny Sharrock – guitar

Technical personnel

- Robert Musso – producer

== Release history ==
Region	Date	Label	Format	Catalog
United States	1993	MuWorks	CD	MUW 1013
United States	2008	DMG/ARC	CD	0701
