= Gumbo Millennium =

Studio album by 24-7 Spyz
- Released: 1990
- Genre: Heavy metal; hard rock; reggae
- Label: In-Effect

24-7 Spyz chronology
Harder Than You (1989)	Gumbo Millennium (1990)	Strength in Numbers (1992)

Professional ratings
Review scores
Source	Rating
AllMusic	4/5 stars
Calgary Herald	B+
Chicago Tribune	4/4 stars
Collector's Guide to Heavy Metal	4/10
The Encyclopedia of Popular Music	3/5 stars
Los Angeles Times	2.5/4 stars
Rock Hard	8/10
The Rolling Stone Album Guide	3/5 stars

Gumbo Millennium is the second album by the American rock band 24-7 Spyz, released in 1990.

The album peaked at No. 135 on the Billboard 200.

== Critical reception ==
The Chicago Tribune wrote that "Peter Fluid`s elastic, soul-fired phrasing is comparable to Bob Marley`s, and guitarist Jimi Hazel blends the fluidity of Wes Montgomery with flamethrower riffs worthy of Eddie Van Halen." The Los Angeles Times thought that "some crushing metal cuts, inventive jazz-rock hybrids and touching soulfulness are obscured by uninspired filler and especially by plain ol' goofing off that should never have been let out of the studio."

Trouser Press wrote: "Employing an uninhibited stylistic palette that seems to reflect whatever springs into the Spyz’s collective consciousness at any given moment, Gumbo Millennium winds up retreating to opposite corners of relatively serious hard-rock (still with pungent political/personal lyrics, but now employing a thick, hardened metal-cum-hardcore sound) and flaky digressions that don’t really add up to an album." The New Yorker called the album " a definitive document of the [Black Rock] movement and a good definition of it."

== Track listing ==
1. "John Connelly's Theory"
2. "New Super Hero Worship"
3. "Deathstyle"
4. "Dude U Knew"
5. "Culo Posse"
6. "Don't Push Me"
7. "Spyz on Piano"
8. "Valdez 27 Million?"
9. "Don't Break My Heart!"
10. "We'll Have Power"
11. "Racism"
12. "Heaven and Hell"
13. "We Got a Date"
14. "Some Defenders' Memories"

== Personnel ==
- P. Fluid: vocals
- Jimi Hazel: guitar
- Rick Skatore: bass
- Anthony Johnson: drums
