= 24-7 Spyz =

American rock band

- Origin: South Bronx, New York, U.S.
- Genres: Hard rock; heavy metal; funk metal; rap metal
- Years active: 1986–1998; 2003–present
- Labels: In-Effect; East West Records America; Enemy; What Are Records?; The Gumbo Recording Company
- Members: Jimi Hazel; Rick Skatore; Tony Lewis
- Past members: P. Fluid; Anthony Johnson; Matt Martin; Kindu Phibes; Mackie Jayson; Jeff Brodnax; Joel Maitoza; Sekou Lumumba; Ronny Drayton; Phillip "Fish" Fisher; Tobias Ralph

24-7 Spyz (pronounced "twenty-four-seven spies") are an American rock band from the South Bronx, New York, formed in 1986, originally consisting of Jimi Hazel (born Wayne K. Richardson) (guitars), Rick Skatore (born Kenneth D. Lucas) (bass), Kindu Phibes (drums), and P. Fluid (born Peter Forrest) (vocals). The band plays hard rock, heavy metal, funk metal and rap metal songs which incorporate elements of jazz, R&B, soul, reggae and hardcore punk. The fact that they are African Americans playing variations of heavy metal led critics to compare them to bands such as Living Colour and Bad Brains. After several lineup changes, the band broke up in 1998, but reformed in 2003 before releasing their first new album of original material in over a decade in 2006. As of 2021, the lineup of the band includes Hazel, Skatore, and drummer Tobias Ralph.

== Band history ==
=== Early days and In-Effect Records ===
Upon their formation in 1986, the band, consisting of Jimi Hazel, Rick Skatore, Kindu Phibes, and P. Fluid, quickly earned a dedicated following in New York City due to the eclectic mix of their music. The band would switch gears from Motown and soul sounds with lush vocal harmonies to violent heavy metal and hardcore punk with ease, sometimes several times within the course of one song. Phibes left the band in 1987.

In 1988, In-Effect Records, a subsidiary of Relativity, signed the band which now included Anthony Johnson, formerly of the three-piece New York ska band, A-Kings, replacing Phibes on drums. The band released their debut album, the genre-hopping Harder Than You, produced by Bob Musso and Jimi Hazel, in 1989. The first single was a cover of the Kool & the Gang song "Jungle Boogie." Critics and fans took notice of the band's left-wing political stance and the unique sound of their tight-knit, high-energy music. The album sold just under 300,000 units due to non-stop touring worldwide and became an underground hit. It remains a pioneering classic in the rock/funk/hip-hop genre made popular in later years by such bands as 311, Limp Bizkit, and Kid Rock. The video for "Jungle Boogie" was the first single video on MTV to air on all of the following specialty shows: 120 Minutes, Yo! MTV Raps, Hard 60, and Headbangers Ball.

The band's second album, 1990's Gumbo Millennium, produced by Jimi Hazel and Tom Soares, was once again released through In-Effect Records. The album was much softer than the previous effort, focusing mostly on clean guitar and lush R&B harmonies and grooves although it still contained elements of thrash metal and punk. The first single, "Don't Break My Heart!," while commercially viable, failed to receive radio airplay. Regardless, the album sold over 300,000 units once again due to massive amounts of touring and proved to be an underground success. It soon brought the attention of several major labels. The band were soon opening for Jane's Addiction on their 'Ritual De Lo Habitual' tour. The tour brought the band to a new audience but their growing success could not halt the sudden departure of Anthony Johnson and P. Fluid. Fluid made the announcement of his departure during the band's live performance on the final date of the Jane's Addiction tour. Allegedly, he had not made it known to his bandmates beforehand. Johnson followed suit and, as a result of the departures, the band dropped out of a planned co-headlining tour with Suicidal Tendencies. Fluid soon made it known that he intended to start a new band named The P. Fluid Foundation.

24-7 Spyz personnel
(1986–1987)	Jimi Hazel - guitars, backing vocals; Rick Skatore - bass, backing vocals; P. Fluid - lead vocals; Kindu Phibes - drums
(1988–1990)	Jimi Hazel - guitars, backing vocals; Rick Skatore - bass, backing vocals; P. Fluid - lead vocals; Anthony Johnson - drums
(1990–1991)	Jimi Hazel - guitars, backing vocals; Rick Skatore - bass, backing vocals; Jeff Brodnax - lead vocals; Mackie Jayson - drums
(1991–1994)	Jimi Hazel - guitars, backing vocals; Rick Skatore - bass, backing vocals; Jeff Brodnax - lead vocals; Joel Maitoza - drums
(1994-1995)	Jimi Hazel - guitars, backing vocals; Rick Skatore - bass, backing vocals; Forrest (formerly P. Fluid) - lead vocals; Anthony Johnson - drums
(1996)	Jimi Hazel - guitars, lead vocals; Rick Skatore - bass, backing vocals; Joel Maitoza - drums
(1997)	Jimi Hazel - guitars, lead vocals; Rick Skatore - bass, backing vocals; Matt Martin - drums
(1998)	Jimi Hazel - guitars, lead vocals; Rick Skatore - bass, backing vocals; Tony Lewis - drums
(1998–2003)	BAND SPLIT
(2003–2004)	Jimi Hazel - guitars, lead vocals; Rick Skatore - bass, backing vocals; Tony Lewis - drums
(2005–2011)	Jimi Hazel - guitars, lead vocals; Rick Skatore - bass, backing vocals; Tobias Ralph - drums
(2011–2012)	Jimi Hazel - guitars, backing vocals; Rick Skatore - bass, backing vocals; Jeff Brodnax - lead vocals; Joel Maitoza - drums
(2012–2014)	Jimi Hazel - guitars, lead vocals; Rick Skatore - bass, backing vocals; Ronny Drayton - guitars, backing vocals; Sekou Lumumba - drums
(2014–2020)	Jimi Hazel - guitars, lead vocals; Rick Skatore - bass, backing vocals; Ronny Drayton - guitars, backing vocals; Phillip "Fish" Fisher - drums
(2020–2021)	Jimi Hazel - guitars, lead vocals; Rick Skatore - bass, backing vocals; Tony Lewis - drums
(2021–2023)	Jimi Hazel - guitars, lead vocals; Rick Skatore - bass, backing vocals; Tobias Ralph - drums
(2023–present)	Jimi Hazel - guitars, lead vocals; Rick Skatore - bass, backing vocals; Tony Lewis - drums

=== East West Records America ===
Despite the loss of two of the band's four members, Rick Skatore and Jimi Hazel decided to continue on. Jeff Brodnax was brought in as the new vocalist along with former Cro-Mags and Bad Brains drummer, Mackie Jayson. Jayson only rehearsed with the band for a short time before leaving, to be replaced by Joel Maitoza. The new lineup received rave reviews and the band was soon signed to East West Records America, a division of Atlantic Records headed by label president, Sylvia Rhone. The company tested the marketability of the new band by releasing a five-song EP titled This is...24-7 Spyz!, produced by Jimi Hazel and Bruce Calder in 1991.

In 1992, the band received their largest commercial exposure to date by appearing in a Budweiser television commercial that aired for the first five months of the year. Soon after, the hour-long Strength In Numbers album, produced by Terry Date and Jimi Hazel, was released and proved to be the band's most critically acclaimed release to date. The album saw the band depart from its New York hardcore roots to concentrate more on heavy metal and soul. Unfortunately, by that time, popular music had begun shifting away from musical dexterity and in favor of the simplicity of grunge. The album's single, "Break The Chains," received minor radio airplay and MTV exposure but Sylvia Rhone pulled the label's support before dropping the band altogether. To the band's dismay, the label only pressed 18,000 pieces and allotted 2,000 for press purposes, thus making the disc widely unavailable almost immediately.

Disgusted by their dealings with East West and Sylvia Rhone, the band members began working on other musical projects. Hazel and Skatore looked to form a new band, Black Angus, with Follow for Now drummer Bernard "Enrique" Coley. The Black Angus sessions were eventually recorded with drummer and longtime friend Carlton Smith of the Royal Crescent Mob. Maitoza formed Shockhead with vocalist Joseph McCraw and Nixons bassist Ricky Wolking, recording one disc, titled Television, which was produced by Jimi Hazel. Brodnax concentrated on his band, Egypt.

=== The Enemy Label ===
When Hazel and Skatore discovered how popular the first two albums remained in Europe, they reunited with Anthony Johnson and P. Fluid, now performing as Forrest (his real last name) to release Temporarily Disconnected, produced by Jimi Hazel. The album was released exclusively in Europe by Enemy Records, and was followed by a quick tour of the continent before Johnson and Fluid left the band once again.

In March 1996, 6, produced by Jimi Hazel, was released exclusively in Europe through the Enemy label. The album contained covers of The Association's "Along Comes Mary" and Love's "7 and 7 Is." The album was titled 6 due to it being the sixth release by the band. In September 1996, What Are Records released Heavy Metal Soul by the Pound, the American version of 6. The track listing would remain almost identical to 6 with the exception of the removal of "Along Comes Mary" and "7 and 7 Is" and the additions of "Earth And Sky" and "Save The World" as replacements. Both versions of the album saw the band returning as a trio with Jimi Hazel on guitar and lead vocals, Rick Skatore on bass and Joel Maitoza returning to the drums for the first time in four years. Two tracks recorded before Maitoza's return featured guest drummer Carlton Smith. Additional vocals were contributed by Doug Pinnick of King's X for the songs "Love And Peace" and "Yeah X 3". The 1997 tour to support the album featured Matt Martin on drums.

In 1997, the If I Could EP, featuring remixes and live performances recorded while Maitoza was still a member, was released exclusively through the band's fan club. In 1998, a disagreement between Hazel and Skatore led to the dissolution of 24-7 Spyz. In the months prior to the breakup, drummer Tony Lewis had been performing with the band.

=== Solo albums and reformations ===
In 2000, Hazel co-wrote several songs for a band named Crime, who were using the material to shop for labels. Skatore re-emerged in 2001, playing bass in a band named Blockk-16 alongside Savatage guitarist Chris Caffery. The band's first release, Too Brutal For Radio also featured appearances by Andrew Freeman, Ray Freeman Jr, Mosh Ben-Ari, Ronen Barak and Spread Eagle vocalist, Ray West. After the release of the album, Skatore suffered from a collapsed lung. Despite their prior disagreement, Hazel came to the aid of his friend by performing together as 24-7 Spyz for a benefit concert at New York City's CBGB's. Proceeds from the show went towards Skatore's medical bills.

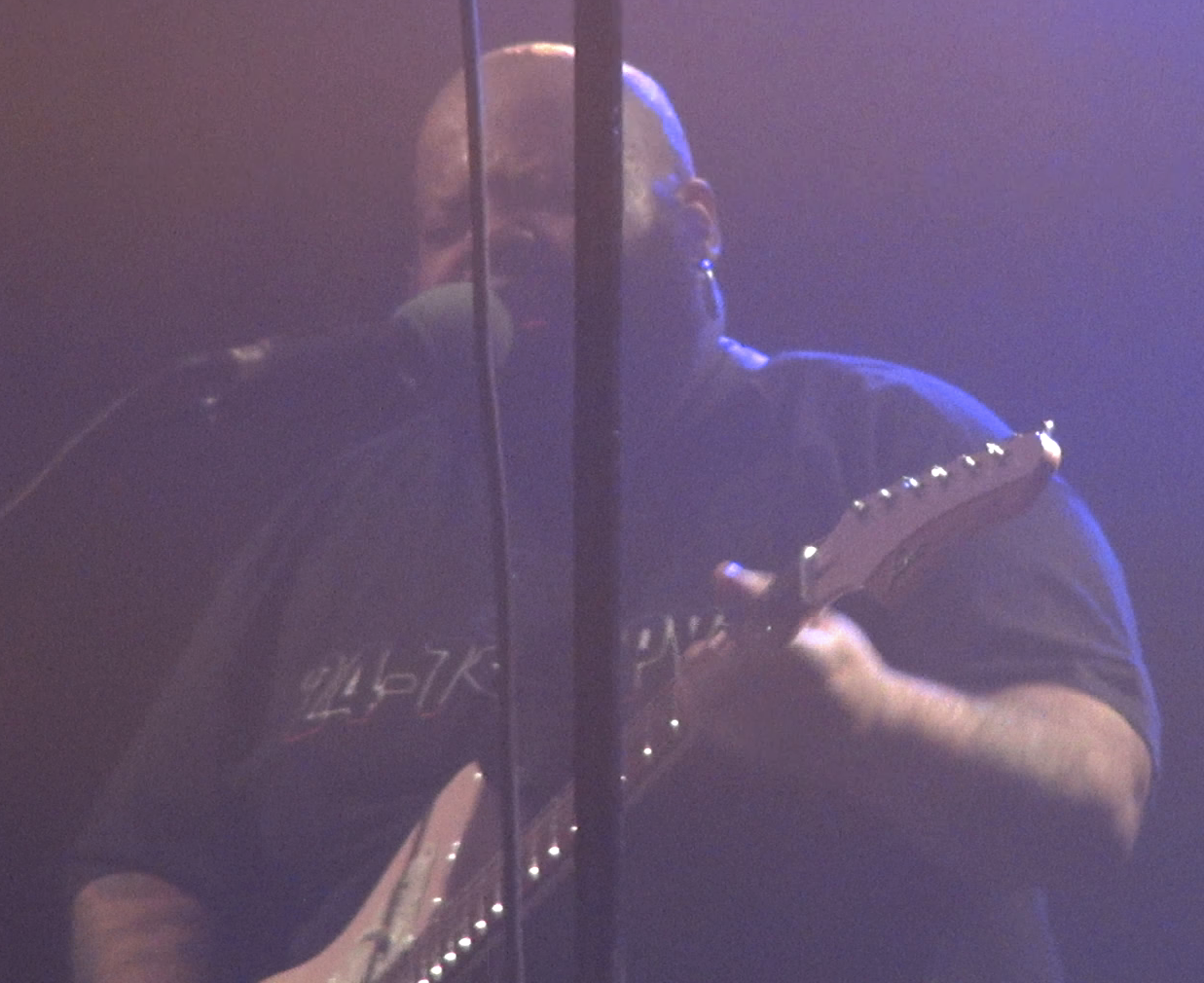
Jimi Hazel with 24-7 Spyz in 2012

In 2002, Hazel released his first solo CD, 21stCenturySouthBronxRockStar on his own label, The Gumbo Recording Company. It was followed by the formation of Maitoza's new band, Crown 10, in May 2003. 2003 also saw Hazel and Skatore reunite for a second CBGB's performance with Tony Lewis on drums. Later that year, Hazel and Skatore would announce the official re-formation of 24-7 Spyz. In 2005, the band released a limited edition DVD titled HMS4L: The Many Lives of Walter Rattamus through their website. The DVD tells the history of the band through the various incarnations and also includes commentary from Jimi Hazel and Rick Skatore.

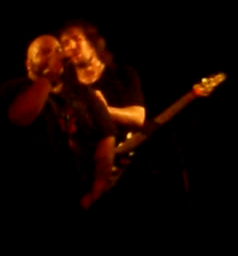
Ron "Bumblefoot" Thal with Jimi Hazel at a show in Brooklyn

In 2006, the band released Face the Day, with new drummer Tobias Ralph, through The Gumbo Recording Company label. The disc was produced by Jimi Hazel and Ron "Bumblefoot" Thal and was the first 24-7-Spyz studio album in a decade. Shortly thereafter, the band released a live performance, recorded months before the band had split up in 1998, as a digital download and CD titled Can You Hear the Sound?.

In 2009, Hazel and Skatore began focusing their attention on a new side project called A.N.M. (Anti Nigger Machine). Other members of the band included Doug Pinnick (vocals), Greg Fulton (guitar and vocals), Spacey T (guitar and vocals) plus Philip "Fish" Fisher (drums and percussion). Later that year, they released a four-song demo via their MySpace page. In 2010, the band began soliciting donations to fund the recording of their first album.

On August 6, 2011, 24-7 Spyz performed at the Highline Ballroom in New York City. The show saw former members Jeff Brodnax and Joel Maitoza return for a reunion of the Strength in Numbers era lineup. In November 2011, the band announced that the lineup would continue performing together with the Strength In Numbers Twentieth Anniversary Tour beginning with a string of European dates from late February through March 2012. In September 2012, it was announced that the band had officially parted ways with Brodnax and Maitoza once again. It was also stated that Maitoza, Ralph and Lewis would all take part in recording drum tracks for a planned upcoming album. In November 2012, the band announced that Sekou Lumumba of Bedouin Soundclash had officially joined the band on drums. Guitarist Ronny Drayton would join the band soon after. On April 27, 2014, an image posted by the band on their official Facebook page stated that the band was on hiatus. In October 2014, the band announced via their official Facebook page that Phillip "Fish" Fisher, a founding member of Fishbone, had taken the position as drummer for the band. In January 2015, it was officially announced that the band had emerged from their self-imposed hiatus with plans to not only perform select dates in Europe but also to release a single and a new EP later in the year.

The digital single, "Jungle (for Jef)" was credited as 24-7 Spyz & Family and featured a core lineup of Hazel and Drayton alongside drummer Lenny White and bassist Chico Huff, with additional instrumentation performed by Jesse Johnson, Eddie Martinez, Vernon Reid and Skatore. The song was a tribute to Jef Lee Johnson, a friend and fellow musician who had died in 2013 at age 54 due to complications from pneumonia and diabetes, and was released via iTunes and SoundCloud. The band's next release came in April 2016 in the form of CD and digital single for a song titled "Anthem" that would also be featured on their upcoming album. It was announced in 2017 that The Soundtrack To The Innermost Galaxy was expected to be released in 2018. In April 2018, the band started accepting pledges through PledgeMusic.com to fund the release of the album although a release date has yet to be announced. At Fishbone's August 24, 2018 Brooklyn, New York show, a three-piece version of the band consisting of Hazel, Skatore and Fish performed a short, unannounced opening set. On January 28, 2019, The Soundtrack to the Innermost Galaxy, their eighth studio album, was released.

In January 2020, a three-piece version of the band featuring Hazel, Skatore and Tony Lewis, replacing Fisher who had returned to the Fishbone lineup, announced their "Sex, Juice & Heavy Metal Soul" tour which was scheduled to run from April through October 2020. However, the tour was postponed indefinitely due to the COVID-19 pandemic. On February 7, 2020, Ronnie Drayton died of Non Hodgkins Lymphoma at the age of 67.

In September 2021, the band's Facebook page indicated that Hazel and Skatore were once again working on new music with Tobias Ralph playing drums. In October 2022, the band released a digital single, via Bandcamp, titled "Angels & Demons." The track features guest vocalists Ryan Bland of New York hardcore band Ache, and Corinne Drewery of Swing Out Sister.

=== Activity of former members ===
Anthony Johnson reappeared as the drummer for the band Middle Man before moving on to perform a lead role in the Off-Broadway production of Stomp. He was also featured in the HBO film Stomp Out Loud. While performing in Stomp, Johnson was recruited to play drums for Japanese pop star, Bonnie Pink. Johnson relocated to Japan where he lived and toured with the band for a time. He was named as the drummer for Ben Folds during a tour supporting Folds' solo album, Rockin' the Suburbs. In 2005, he made an appearance on the self-titled, five-song release by Lost Tricks, a band fronted by actor Trevor Oswalt. He has also performed with artists such as Eagle-Eye Cherry, Dionne Farris and Vanessa Daou. Johnson lives in New York City where he continues to participate in music, as a member of The Morning After Girls, and theatre.

P. Fluid and the P. Fluid Foundation performed in clubs in and around New York City but never released an album. Shortly after leaving 24-7 Spyz for the second time, P. Fluid, now using the name Forrest Thinner, formed BlkVampires. The band released a five-song EP titled The Collector's Item through the Catch A Fire website. These five songs had previously been recorded by 24-7 Spyz and released on Temporarily Disconnected. In 2005, the New York City based band released their debut, self-titled album, compiling seven previously unreleased tracks as well as the five songs previously included on The Collector's Item EP. In 2010, the band released a follow-up ten-song EP/DVD titled Blkcula. A five-song release, titled The Devil's Music, followed in 2012. Also in 2012, Thinner was the creative director and publisher of a book titled The HarlequinX. The book, based on a short film and characters created by Thinner, was written by CJ Cassidy and edited by Hector Valle. Thinner also appeared in the film Riot on the Dance Floor, a documentary about City Gardens, a nightclub formerly located in Trenton, New Jersey. In 2015, the band released the two-song Eric Garner EP. In 2019, Thinner announced that BlkVampires had broken up and that he was embarking on his first solo project, BlkVampiresX. In 2022, BlkVampiresX released the single "Bike Ride in Manhattan/La Flaca Negra", produced by Swedish guitarist Apollo Kris. On January 13, 2025, Peter Forrest was found beaten to death in the back of an ambulette he had been driving in the Bronx. He was 64.

Joel Maitoza has continued playing drums with bands such as Crown 10, Shockhead, Headtrip Superstar, Don Lithgow, Sahara, Seventrain and Kerry Conally. Maitoza reunited with 24-7 Spyz in 2011 for a reunion of the Strength in Numbers lineup and continued to tour with the band through 2012 for the band's European tour dates. In September 2012, it was announced that Maitoza and the band had parted ways again, but that Maitoza would contribute drum tracks to the band's planned 2013 album along with other previous Spyz drummers. In 2013, Maitoza joined the hard rock band, Seventrain, which also features former members of Cage and Tourniquet. After two albums, Maitoza parted with Seventrain in early 2019 citing irreconcilable differences. In early 2020, Maitoza announced his solo project called The Frequency Conspiracy.

Jeff Brodnax went on to join the band Egypt. Like Maitoza, Brodnax reunited with 24-7 Spyz in 2011 and continued to tour with the band through 2012 for the band's European tour dates. In September 2012, it was announced that Brodnax had parted with the band for a second time. In 2019, Brodnax announced the formation of his new band, The Soulvation Society.

== Discography ==
=== Studio albums ===
- Harder Than You (1989)
- Gumbo Millennium (1990)
- Strength in Numbers (1992)
- Temporarily Disconnected (1995)
- 6 (alternate version released in America as Heavy Metal Soul by the Pound) (1996)
- Heavy Metal Soul by the Pound (alternate version released in Europe as 6) (1996)
- Face the Day (2006)
- The Soundtrack to the Innermost Galaxy (2019)

=== Live albums ===
- Can You Hear the Sound? (2006, recorded live in 1998)

=== EPs ===
- This Is...24-7 Spyz! (1991)
- If I Could (1997)

=== DVDs ===
- HMS4L: The Many Lives of Walter Rattamus (2005)

=== Music videos ===
Year	Song	Album
1989	"Grandma Dynamite"	Harder Than You
1989	"Jungle Boogie"	Harder Than You
1990	"Don't Break My Heart!"	Gumbo Millennium
1991	"Stuntman"	Strength in Numbers
1992	"Break the Chains"	Strength in Numbers
