= Heavy Metal Soul by the Pound =

1996 studio album by 24-7 Spyz

Studio album by 24-7 Spyz
- Released: September 24, 1996
- Studios: 4th Street (Santa Monica, California); The Magic Shop (New York City)
- Genres: Heavy metal; R&B; soul
- Length: 67:15
- Label: What Are Records?

24-7 Spyz chronology
Temporarily Disconnected (1995)	Heavy Metal Soul by the Pound (1996)	Can You Hear the Sound? (1998)

Professional ratings
Review scores
Source	Rating
AllMusic	3/5 stars

Heavy Metal Soul by the Pound is the fifth studio album by American rock band 24-7 Spyz. Released through What Are Records?, it is the first album to feature the band as a trio. Former drummer Joel Maitoza returned to replace Anthony Johnson, but the band decided not to replace departed vocalist P. Fluid. Instead, guitarist Jimi Hazel also became the lead singer (bassist Rick Skatore also shared lead vocal duties in concerts).

The album's music consists of metal riffing, R&B, and "funky" soul.

In March 1996, six months before the release of Heavy Metal Soul by the Pound, the Enemy label released an alternate European version of the album entitled 6. This version of the album does not include the songs "Earth And Sky" and "Save The World." Instead, the album contains covers of The Association's "Along Comes Mary" and Love's "7 and 7 Is." The album is titled 6 due to it being the sixth release by the band, if including the This is...24-7 Spyz! EP.

Together, both versions of the album helped reignite the band's popularity in Europe and the United States, but personal tensions and disagreements between Hazel and Skatore would lead to the official breakup of 24-7 Spyz the following year.

== Track listing ==
=== Heavy Metal Soul by the Pound ===
1. "Spyz In Da House"
2. "Love and Peace"
3. "Yeah x 3"
4. "If I Could"
5. "Burned"
6. "Simple Minded Simon"
7. "Eyes Don't Lie"
8. "Interlude"
9. "El Lame"
10. "Earth and Sky"
11. "Free To Be"
12. "Let Your Fancy Flow"
13. "Crushonya"
14. "No Hope For Niggaz"
15. "Love For Sale"
16. "Clique"
17. "Save The World"

6

Studio album by 24-7 Spyz
- Released: March 5, 1996
- Genres: R&B; soul
- Length: 65:46
- Label: Enemy

24-7 Spyz chronology
Temporarily Disconnected (1995)	6 (1996)	Can You Hear the Sound? (1998)

Professional ratings
Review scores
Source	Rating
AllMusic	link

=== 6 (European version) ===
1. "Spyz in Da House"
2. "Love and Peace"
3. "Yeah x 3"
4. "If I Could"
5. "Burned"
6. "Simple Minded Simon"
7. "Eyes Don't Lie"
8. "Interlude"
9. "El Lame"
10. "Free to Be"
11. "Let Your Fancy Flow"
12. "Crushonya"
13. "No Hope for Niggaz"
14. "Love for Sale"
15. "Clique"
16. "7 and 7 Is"
17. "Along Comes Mary"

== Personnel ==
- Jimi Hazel – guitar, vocals
- Rick Skatore – bass
- Joel Maitoza – drums
- Doug Pinnick – vocals on "Love and Peace" and "Yeah x 3"
