= Cecil Taylor Unit =

Studio album by Cecil Taylor
- Released: 1978
- Recorded: April 3–6, 1978
- Studios: Columbia Recording Studios, New York City
- Genre: Free jazz
- Length: 58:34
- Label: New World
- Producer: Sam Parkins

Cecil Taylor chronology
Air Above Mountains (1976)	Cecil Taylor Unit (1978)	3 Phasis (1978)

Cecil Taylor Unit is a 1978 album by the American jazz pianist Cecil Taylor, released on New World Records. The album features Taylor with alto saxophonist Jimmy Lyons, trumpeter Raphe Malik, violinist Ramsey Ameen, bassist Sirone, and drummer Ronald Shannon Jackson. The album was recorded during the same April 1978 sessions that produced 3 Phasis. Taylor is heard on a 96-key Bösendorfer piano, which he stated could "stop you cold if you're not ready."

The album was the result of extensive rehearsals, culminating in a four-day session in the studio. Taylor attempted to transcend the limitations of the studio environment by gathering momentum in the hours leading up to the actual recording. In his liner notes, Spencer Richards recalled attending a five-hour rehearsal at Taylor's home, during which he was surprised to see the players reading from printed music. He wrote: "What followed was some of the most incredible music/sound I have ever heard... piano, trumpet, alto, and violin talked and chanted with each other, celebrating the joy of this music. What gorgeous sounds they made that afternoon!"

In his section of the liner notes, Ramsey Ameen wrote: "If you approach this music with the archaeologist's shovel, you will find yourself among temple ruins. Should you, however, journey into this music with your gift of hearing, you will discover the enduring promise of an inscription carved in stone, addressed to the sun: 'Come, you will see your temple. When you rise above the horizon, it blazes gold in your face.'"

== Reception ==
Professional ratings
Review scores
Source	Rating
AllMusic	4.5/5 stars
The Penguin Guide to Jazz Recordings	4/4 stars
The Rolling Stone Jazz Record Guide	3/5 stars
DownBeat	5/5 stars

The AllMusic review by Michael G. Nastos considered the band heard on the recording "as close to as definitive an ensemble as Taylor has launched".

The authors of the Penguin Guide to Jazz Recordings awarded the album four of four stars, writing: "This was a superb group, full of contrast but bursting with the spirit of Taylor's music and exultant in its ability to make it work... These are colourful records: Ameen is a key member of the group... Malik and Lyons play bright or wounded or bitingly intense lines, and they play their part in a group chemistry which sometimes has the players contrasting with one another, sometimes combining to push the music forward, sometimes providing a textured background to Taylor's own sustained flights of invention. After the ferocity of his playing and organization in the late '60s, there is more obvious light and shade here, the freedoms more generously stated, the underlying lyricism more apparent."

Writing for Burning Ambulance, Phil Freeman described "Idut" as "an erupting music... offering solo piano passages..., duos and trios, and explosive sections involving the entire band", comparing the opening of the piece to that of an Elliott Carter string quartet. "Serdab" is depicted as "an interlude of gentle beauty", whereas "Holiday en Masque" is "a half-hour, album-side-long avalanche of sound". Freeman remarked: "Unison passages, arising out of the overall storm of sound like rainbows arcing between thunderclouds, reveal the scored nature of this music and the intense, focused rehearsals Taylor called before the recording began."

Larry Birnbaum of DownBeat awarded the album five of five stars, calling it the work of "Taylor at the peak of his maturity".

== Track listing ==
All compositions by Cecil Taylor

1. "Idut" – 14:40
2. "Serdab" – 14:13
3. "Holiday en Masque" – 29:41

== Personnel ==
- Cecil Taylor– piano
- Raphe Malik – trumpet
- Jimmy Lyons – alto saxophone
- Ramsey Ameen – violin
- Sirone – double bass
- Ronald Shannon Jackson – drums
