= Last Exit (Last Exit album) =

Live album by Last Exit
- Released: 1986
- Recorded: February 16, 1986 in Paris, France
- Genre: Free jazz
- Length: 38:30
- Label: Enemy
- Producer: Last Exit

Last Exit chronology
Last Exit (1986)	The Noise of Trouble (1986)

Last Exit is the eponymously titled live performance debut album of the free jazz group Last Exit. It was released in 1986 by Enemy Records.

== Reception ==
Professional ratings
Review scores
Source	Rating
AllMusic	4.5/5 stars
The Penguin Guide to Jazz	4/4 stars

In a review for AllMusic, Brian Olewnick wrote: "Entirely improvised, Last Exit nonetheless based most of its pieces on blues forms, even if highly abstracted. This bedrock allowed the musicians, particularly Brötzmann and Sharrock... to freely explore the outer boundaries of their instruments, sublimely soaring over the down to earth and dirty rhythm team of Laswell and Jackson. This tension... reached almost unbearable degrees; its release when they would slide back into a groove leaves the listener utterly drained. Subsequent albums... would come close to attaining this level of intensity and creativity, but Last Exit ranks as a pinnacle both in Laswell's career and in the rock/free improv genre it spawned. A classic release, one that should be in the collection of anyone interested in either contemporary free improvisation or the more creative branches of rock."

Writing for Trouser Press, Greg Kot stated: "On Last Exit, the sound is as unrelenting and incendiary as a blast-furnace... the overall impression is one of supernatural intensity, the agitated instrumental voicings of Sharrock and Brötzmann suggesting human cries."

== Track listing ==
All music is composed by Peter Brötzmann, Ronald Shannon Jackson, Bill Laswell, Sonny Sharrock.

No.	Title	Length
1.	"Discharge"	3:23
2.	"Backwater"	5:27
3.	"Catch as Catch Can"	2:10
4.	"Red Light"	7:54
5.	"Enemy Within"	3:47
6.	"Crackin'"	7:46
7.	"Pig Freedom"	3:59
8.	"Voice of a Skin Hanger"	1:43
9.	"Zulu Butter"	2:21

== Accolades ==
Publication	Country	Accolade	Year	Rank
The Wire	United Kingdom	The Wire - 100 Most Important Records Ever Made (+30)	1992	*

(*) designates unordered lists.

== Personnel ==
Last Exit

- Peter Brötzmann – tenor saxophone
- Ronald Shannon Jackson – drums, voice
- Bill Laswell – Fender 6-string bass
- Sonny Sharrock – guitar

Technical personnel

- Last Exit – producer
- Thi-Linh Le – design
- Robert Musso – mixing
- Nicky Skopelitis – musical arrangements
- Peter Sturge – assistant engineer
- Howie Weinberg – mastering

== Release history ==
Region	Date	Label	Format	Catalog
United States	1986	Enemy	CD, CS, LP	EMY 101
