= Red Warrior (album) =

Studio album by Ronald Shannon Jackson
- Released: 1990
- Genres: Jazz, free jazz
- Label: Axiom
- Producer: Bill Laswell

Ronald Shannon Jackson chronology
Texas (1987)	Red Warrior (1990)	Taboo (1990)

Red Warrior is an album by the American jazz drummer Ronald Shannon Jackson, released in 1990. It was rereleased by Mango Records the following year.

== Production ==
The album was produced by Bill Laswell. Jackson opted to record the album without horns, instead utilizing a three-guitar roster. Red Warrior, inspired by a tour that Jackson undertook in Africa, was recorded in one day.

== Critical reception ==
Professional ratings
Review scores
Source	Rating
AllMusic	4.5/5 stars
Chicago Sun-Times	3.5/4 stars
Robert Christgau	(2-star Honorable Mention)
The Encyclopedia of Popular Music	3/5 stars
Los Angeles Times	2.5/4 stars
The Penguin Guide to Jazz Recordings	2.5/4 stars
The Rolling Stone Album Guide	4.5/5 stars

The Washington Post thought that the guitarists "all fall into one hard-rock or funk cliché after another ... For all the volcanic energy happening at the bottom of this music, the top is so uninspired that it dooms the album." The Los Angeles Times called the album "a flawed experiment," writing that Jackson "failed to solve metal's rhythmic stolidity." The Chicago Sun-Times wrote that "the songs cut deeper than any Jackson has delivered since the days of his harmolodic fusion band, the Decoding Society." The St. Petersburg Times relegated it to "the guitar-mag crowd."

AllMusic wrote that "the mix is expanded with plenty of jazz improvisation, weaves of effects-riddled guitar lines, complex head statements, and, of course, the drummer's pan-stylistic rhythmic support." Billboard called Red Warrior an "extremely uncompromising fusion" album. The New York Times, in its Jackson obituary, deemed it "a fiery guitar-oriented session."

== Track listing ==
No.	Title	Length
1.	"Red Warrior"	4:43
2.	"Ashes"	4:40
3.	"Gate to Heaven"	5:14
4.	"In Every Face"	6:06
5.	"Elders"	13:33
6.	"What's Not Said"	4:15

== Personnel ==
- Ronald Shannon Jackson – drums
- Jack DeSalvo – guitar
- Jef Lee Johnson – guitar
- Konrad Mathieu – bass
- Ramon Pooser – bass
- Steve Salas – guitar
