= Live in the Black Forest =

Live album by Cecil Taylor
- Released: 1978
- Recorded: June 3, 1978
- Venue: SWF-Radio JazzConcert in Kirchzarten, Black Forest, West Germany
- Genre: Free jazz
- Length: 50:05
- Label: MPS

Cecil Taylor chronology
3 Phasis (1978)	Live in the Black Forest (1978)	One Too Many Salty Swift and Not Goodbye (1978)

Live in the Black Forest is a live album by Cecil Taylor recorded in June 1978 at the SWF-Radio JazzConcert in Kirchzarten, Black Forest, West Germany, and released on the MPS label. The album features two performances by Taylor with Raphe Malik, Jimmy Lyons, Ramsey Ameen, Sirone and Ronald Shannon Jackson.

In the album liner notes, Taylor defined improvisation as "the magical lifting of one's spirits to a state of trance. It means the most heightened perception of one's self, but one's self in relation to other forms of life. It means experiencing oneself as another kind of living organism much in the way of a plant, a tree - the growth, you see, that's what it is. I'm hopefully accurate in saying that's what happens when we play. It's not to do with energy, it has to do with religious forces..."

== Reception ==
Professional ratings
Review scores
Source	Rating
Allmusic	3/5 stars
All About Jazz	3.5/5 stars
DownBeat	5/5 stars

The Allmusic review by Ron Wynn states "Cecil Taylor Unit. Typically sweeping piano solos". Writing for All About Jazz, Karl Ackermann commented: "'The Eel Pot' is harmonically unimpeded creativeness and demonstrates why Taylor favored his long association with Lyons who immerses himself in this dynamic improvisation with the acrobatic skill necessary for a live collaboration with Taylor. Malik's commanding, vibrato flashes are a preternatural mélange of warmth and unruliness punctuating Taylor's snippets of melody and torrents of notes. 'Sperichill On Calling' opens with a briefly melodic piano solo joined by Lyons for a bluesy intro to an intense collective jam. Jackson aggressively precipitates frantically fast paced hyper-activity that briefly slows with Ameen's searching solo. He and Taylor command the remaining ten minutes of the performance as the piece shifts in tempo, Lyons and Malik and Sirone abruptly moving in and out of focus... Even among his fan base, Taylor has been the quintessential riddle wrapped in an enigma. His music is dense and sometimes overwhelming and though Live in the Black Forest is sometimes cited as a more accessible Taylor primer, it is no less complex than the body of his work. Taylor has always had critical detractors but often for no more than the irritating inability to explain his music. Live in the Black Forest is for Taylor fans, particularly those who favor the pianist outside his preferred solo formation. Like most everything Taylor has recorded, this once hard-to-find recording requires patience and open ears."

Phil Freeman, in an article for Burning Ambulance, wrote: "The first piece, 'The Eel Pot,' begins with solo piano, followed quickly by the entry of Malik and Lyons (playing unison phrases) and then Ameen. Jackson hits huge thunderous tom rolls, and the band has become fully present. Then things can truly get started. Piano and trumpet exchanges, violin and alto saxophone tinkering at the margins. Martial drumming. There's bass work, but it’s not particularly high in the mix at first; only later does Sirone's forceful plucking assert itself, when the group becomes, of all things, a piano trio, albeit the most aggressive one I've ever heard. Jackson is playing something close to a death metal blast beat, as Taylor dances across the keyboard like a maniac and Sirone throbs between them. The next player to re-enter after this thunderous passage is Ameen, offering almost Bela Bartók-like stabs as though to pay tribute to the concert's central European location. He and Taylor duet passionately, with Sirone still lingering in the background. Eventually, the full ensemble returns to roaring life, and the piece comes to a raucous close, celebrated by wild applause from what sounds like a large audience... The disc's second half, 'Sperichill On Calling,' is more or less in the same spirit as its predecessor, but it's less aggressive, a midtempo marathon with occasional eruptions. Around the 11-minute mark, Jackson bursts into a particularly aggressive drum solo, smashing the cymbals and battering the snare, as Malik's trumpet unleashes a repeated, fanfare-like figure. Malik gets a lot of solo space during 'Sperichill,' his rippling upper-register lines extraordinarily full and vibrant. When Taylor takes the lead, his playing is often quite delicate; during one quiet passage, he and Ameen duet totally unaccompanied, and it's possibly the album's high point. Again and again throughout this group's discography, it becomes unmistakable that the violin is the most important instrument, besides the piano, to the whole project."

== Track listing ==
All compositions by Cecil Taylor.

1. "The Eel Pot" - 24:57
2. "Sperichill On Calling" - 25:08

- Recorded on June 3, 1978

== Personnel ==
- Cecil Taylor: piano
- Jimmy Lyons: alto saxophone
- Raphe Malik: trumpet
- Ramsey Ameen: violin
- Sirone: bass
- Ronald Shannon Jackson: drums
