= 3 Phasis =

Studio album by Cecil Taylor
- Released: 1978
- Recorded: April 1978
- Genre: Free jazz
- Length: 57:12
- Label: New World

Cecil Taylor chronology
Cecil Taylor Unit (1978)	3 Phasis (1978)	Live in the Black Forest (1978)

3 Phasis is an album by Cecil Taylor, recorded in April 1978 and released on the New World label. The album features three performances by Taylor with Raphe Malik, Jimmy Lyons, Ramsey Ameen, Sirone, and Ronald Shannon Jackson. The album was recorded during the same sessions that produced the Cecil Taylor Unit.

== Critical reception ==
Professional ratings
Review scores
Source	Rating
AllMusic	4/5 stars
The Penguin Guide to Jazz Recordings	4/4 stars
The Rolling Stone Jazz Record Guide	5/5 stars
DownBeat	5/5 stars

The New York Times wrote that the album "is an essential recording because, like all great jazzmen, Mr. Taylor reiterates his blues roots on the second side with a rent-party vamp that inspires Jimmy Lyons and the ensemble to a powerhouse celebration of New Orleans in a new context."

== Track listing ==
All compositions by Cecil Taylor.

1. "3 Phasis" – 57:12
  - Recorded in April 1978

== Personnel ==
- Cecil Taylor: piano
- Jimmy Lyons: alto saxophone
- Raphe Malik: trumpet
- Ramsey Ameen: violin
- Sirone: bass
- Ronald Shannon Jackson: drums
