= The Noise of Trouble: Live in Tokyo =

Live album by Last Exit
- Released: 1986
- Recorded: October 2, 1986 at Parco Space Part 3, Tokyo; October 5, 1986 at Pit Inn, Tokyo, Japan
- Genre: Free jazz
- Length: 39:50
- Label: Enemy
- Producer: Last Exit

Last Exit chronology
Last Exit (1986)	The Noise of Trouble: Live in Tokyo (1986)	Cassette Recordings '87 (1987)

The Noise of Trouble: Live in Tokyo is the second live album by the free jazz group Last Exit. It was released in 1986 by Enemy Records.

== Reception ==
Professional ratings
Review scores
Source	Rating
AllMusic	4/5 stars
Robert Christgau	B+
The Penguin Guide to Jazz	4/4 stars

In a review for AllMusic, Steve Huey wrote: "the group's interplay was pretty well-honed by this point, comfortable enough that they could welcome guests for some of the Tokyo performances... Shorter, free-form sound explorations... alternate with longer, freely improvised jams highlighting the group's uncanny feel for smooth transitions... For listeners attuned to such extreme sounds, The Noise of Trouble is intoxicating in its raw, undiluted power and total disregard for propriety, not to mention the musicians' mastery of improvisational communication."

Stuart Nicholson commented: "Everyone was at the top of their game, musically, conceptually and creatively, something that was underlined by their total confidence in each other's playing... Recorded live... on the heels of a successful European tour, Last Exit brought spontaneity, energy and a collective empathy that working regularly together brings."

Writing for Trouser Press, Greg Kot stated: "the restless quartet flies from traditional blues motifs to high-energy skronk and back again with dexterity and daring."

== Track listing ==
Side one
No.	Title	Writer(s)	Length
1.	"Straw Dog/You Got Me Rockin'/Take Cover/Ma Rainey/Crack Butter"	Brötzmann, Brown, Jackson, Laswell, Reed, Sharrock	5:54
2.	"Pig Cheese"	Sharrock	1:56
3.	"Panzer Be-Bop"	Brötzmann, Jackson, Laswell, Sharrock	9:02
4.	"Base Metal"	Laswell	2:28

Side two
No.	Title	Writer(s)	Length
1.	"Blind Willie"	Sharrock	6:21
2.	"Needless=Balls"	Brötzmann, Sakata	4:57
3.	"Civil War Test"	Brötzmann, Jackson, Laswell, Sharrock	1:59
4.	"Help Me Mo, I'm Blind"	Brötzmann, Hancock, Jackson, Laswell, Sharrock	7:13

== Personnel ==
Last Exit

- Peter Brötzmann – baritone saxophone, tenor saxophone, tárogató, cover art
- Ronald Shannon Jackson – drums, voice
- Bill Laswell – Fender 6-string bass
- Sonny Sharrock – guitar

Additional musicians

- Herbie Hancock – piano
- Akira Sakata – alto saxophone, soprano clarinet

Technical personnel

- Yukihiro Fukuda – assistant engineer
- Mitsuharu Kobayashi – mastering
- Last Exit – producer
- Robert Musso – mixing
- Seigen Ono – engineering

== Release history ==
Region	Date	Label	Format	Catalog
United States	1986	Enemy	CS, LP	88561-8178
United States	1987	Enemy	CD	EMY 103
