= Cassette Recordings '87 =

Live album by Last Exit
- Released: March 1987
- Recorded: North Sea Jazz Festival, Copenhagen, Denmark; Den Haag, Allentown, PA
- Genre: Free jazz
- Length: 39:20
- Label: Enemy
- Producer: Robert Musso

Last Exit chronology
The Noise of Trouble (1986)	Cassette Recordings '87 (1987)	Iron Path (1988)

Cassette Recordings '87, also issued with the title From the Board, is the third live album by the free jazz group Last Exit. It was released in March 1987 by Enemy Records.

== Reception ==
Professional ratings
Review scores
Source	Rating
AllMusic	3/5 stars
Allmusic	4/5 stars
The Penguin Guide to Jazz	3/4 stars

In a review for AllMusic, John Dougan wrote: "Still live, still pumping big-time improvised noise wail... This is mighty powerful stuff, and those a tad squeamish when it comes to full-bore noisemaking and improvised energy should explore this record only with proper supervision. There's no telling what will happen if you're left alone with these guys for any length of time."

Steve Huey, in a second AllMusic review, stated: "more fine work from free jazz's answer to heavy metal... if you like their sound, most of what's out there is pretty high-quality, and From the Board is no exception."

== Track listing ==
All music is composed by Peter Brötzmann, Ronald Shannon Jackson, Bill Laswell, Sonny Sharrock.

Side one
No.	Title	Length
1.	"Line of Fire"	20:27

Side two
No.	Title	Length
1.	"Big Boss Man"	1:03
2.	"Sore Titties"	6:17
3.	"Ulli Bulli Fooli"	3:57
4.	"Ma Rainey"	5:09
5.	"My Balls/Your Chin"	2:27

== Personnel ==
Last Exit

- Peter Brötzmann – alto saxophone, bass saxophone, tenor saxophone, tárogató
- Ronald Shannon Jackson – drums, voice
- Bill Laswell – Fender 6-string bass
- Sonny Sharrock – guitar

Technical personnel

- Robert Musso – producer
- Howie Weinberg – mastering

== Release history ==
Region	Date	Label	Format	Catalog
Germany	1987	Enemy	LP	EMY 105
Japan	1988	Enemy	CD	32JC-299
Japan	1988	Enemy	LP	28JAL-3156
United States	1988	Celluloid	CD, LP	CEL 6140
United States	1995	Enemy	CD	EMY 105-2
