= SXL Live in Japan =

Live album by SXL
- Released: 1987
- Recorded: July 27, 1987
- Venue: Inkstick Shibaura Factory, Tokyo, Japan
- Genre: Jazz fusion
- Length: 53:41
- Label: CBS/Sony Japan
- Producer: SXL, Tom Suzuki

SXL chronology
SXL Live in Japan (1987)	Into the Outlands (1988)

SXL Live in Japan is a live performance album by world music and jazz fusion ensemble SXL, released in 1987 by CBS/Sony Japan. For the first half of the album, the group performs separately from one another. Musicians Aïyb Dieng, Ronald Shannon Jackson, Bill Laswell and L. Shankar perform on "Arambam", a variation on the processional pattern on SamulNori's debut piece "Uttari kut". "Clouds, Wind, Rain, Thunder and Lightning" was played by SamulNori and included an extended sequence taken from their piece "Samdo nongak".

== Track listing ==
No.	Title	Writer(s)	Length
1.	"Arambam"	Aïyb Dieng, Ronald Shannon Jackson, Bill Laswell, L. Shankar	10:19
2.	"Clouds, Wind, Rain, Thunder and Lightning"	SamulNori	17:47
3.	"SXL Exorcism" (Kut Kua Ri/Taung Tauk K'ung (including Juice))	SXL	21:36
4.	"Madivu"	SXL	3:59

== Personnel ==
SXL

- Aïyb Dieng – percussion
- Ronald Shannon Jackson – drums
- Bill Laswell – bass guitar
- SamulNori – percussion
- L. Shankar – violin, voice

Technical

- SXL – producer
- Tom Suzuki – producer, mixing

== Release history ==
Region	Date	Label	Format	Catalog
Japan	1987	CBS/Sony Japan	CD	32DH 824
