= One Too Many Salty Swift and Not Goodbye =

Live album by Cecil Taylor
- Released: 1980
- Recorded: June 14, 1978
- Venue: Liederhalle/Mozartsaal, Stuttgart
- Genre: Free jazz
- Label: Hat Hut

Cecil Taylor chronology
Live in the Black Forest (1978)	One Too Many Salty Swift and Not Goodbye (1980)	Historic Concerts (1978)

CD Reissue cover

One Too Many Salty Swift and Not Goodbye is a live album by Cecil Taylor recorded in Stuttgart, Germany, on June 14, 1978 and released on the Hat Hut label. The album features performances by Taylor with Raphe Malik, Jimmy Lyons, Ramsey Ameen, Sirone and Ronald Shannon Jackson. The album was originally released as a triple LP featuring the Cecil Taylor Unit performances (tracks 4–11 all titled "One Too Many Salty Swift and Not Goodbye") then rereleased as a double CD with duets by Lyons & Malik and Ameen & Sirone and a solo by Shannon Jackson added and the titles changed to the performers for each track.

On the evening of the concert, the organizers did not allow Taylor to use a high-quality, well-tuned grand piano that remained backstage, locked and covered, stating that it was reserved for classical pianists, and he was forced to use an inferior instrument.

== Reception ==
Professional ratings
Review scores
Source	Rating
Allmusic	4/5 stars
The Rolling Stone Jazz Record Guide	5/5 stars
The Guardian	4/5 stars
All About Jazz	5/5 stars

The Allmusic review by Michael G. Nastos states: "With one of his greatest groups in a powerful performance, this was the Unit at its peak."

Writing for the BBC, Martin Longley commented: "Cecil must have drilled the Unit on exactly where their soloing parts were to be placed, as the music's development sounds at once unfettered and controlled, the overall structure very tightly formed... This is an epic work that has great strength at its heart, broken up by the odd contemplative moment... when the Unit is firing in full, dense textures and thrilling interplay make for hurtling music that is multi-layered in its single-mindedness."

In a review for The Guardian, John Fordham wrote: "This set opens with a set of duos and solos - spikily lyrical and closely attentive between alto saxist Jimmy Lyons and trumpeter Raphe Malik, and between bassist Sirone and violinist Ramsey Ameen, plus a mix of street-parade bass drum sounds, crackling rolls and dramatic pacing from Shannon Jackson on his own. Taylor enters stealthily at first, soon imperiously striding and rolling around Jackson's drumming, firing flares of treble runs against Sirone's high bowed notes... It isn't all flat-out blasting, however, with the second disc revealing Taylor's melodic originality (complemented by Sirone's deep growls and high, flickering figures) in its opening passages. The excellent Lyons is quite traditionally lyrical before breaking into a run, and Taylor's later slowly-developing solo episodes are starkly hypnotic, even if the long-suffering piano doesn't sound too good. Unique music."

Rex Butters, writing for All About Jazz, stated: "this leonine work anticipates the increasingly popular juxtaposition of composed/cued/improvised elements artfully juggled to the delight of listener and musician alike... this collection captures giants performing in an inspirational blaze." In a separate review for All About Jazz, Jerry D'Souza remarked: "Taylor has several remarkable recordings to his name. This one stands up and makes a redoubtable statement all over again... It testifies not only to the tight weave that the Unit had structured between them, but also to the empathy that each musician shared with the other... Nothing is cast in stone; everything evolves, making this a document that transcends time."

Writing for Burning Ambulance, Phil Freeman called the recording "an astonishing musical event", and commented: "Once Taylor strikes the keys, the music becomes overwhelming. I mean that; One Too Many Salty Swift and Not Goodbye is almost too much to take... If you can manage to stagger away to a safe distance and gain some perspective, it becomes apparent that Taylor's methodology at this concert was the same as in the studio or on Live in the Black Forest... the ultimate impression is of standing in the path of an avalanche. Every player involved is hitting so hard, emitting so much raw energy, that to listen to the entire performance in one sitting is the kind of thing that should earn a person a trophy or a plaque. One Too Many is a fitting capper to this band's short life, because when it finally ends, you can be forgiven for believing you've heard all the music your brain will ever be able to store, by Cecil Taylor or anyone else, for the rest of your life."

== Track listing ==
All compositions by Cecil Taylor.

1. "Duet Jimmy Lyons/Raphe Malik" - 3:49
2. "Duet Ramsey Ameen/Sirone" - 11:24
3. "Solo Ronald Shannon Jackson" - 5:39
4. "Cecil Taylor Unit" - 24:13
5. "Cecil Taylor Unit" - 27:26
6. "Cecil Taylor Unit" - 10:42
7. "Cecil Taylor Unit" - 12:06
8. "Cecil Taylor Unit" - 6:13
9. "Cecil Taylor Unit" - 18:04
10. "Cecil Taylor Unit" - 19:07
11. "Cecil Taylor Unit" - 9:20

- Recorded in Stuttgart, Germany on June 14, 1978

== Personnel ==
- Cecil Taylor: piano
- Jimmy Lyons: alto saxophone
- Raphe Malik: trumpet
- Ramsey Ameen: violin
- Sirone: bass
- Ronald Shannon Jackson: drums
