= Into the Outlands =

Live album by SXL
- Released: 1988
- Recorded: July and August 1987 in Osaka, Tokyo and Fukuoka, Japan
- Genre: Jazz fusion
- Length: 44:18
- Label: Celluloid/Enemy
- Producer: Robert Musso

SXL chronology
SXL Live in Japan (1987)	Into the Outlands (1988)

Professional ratings
Review scores
Source	Rating
Allmusic	4/5 stars

Into the Outlands is the second live performance album by world music and jazz fusion ensemble SXL, released in 1988 by Celluloid Records.

== Track listing ==
All music is composed by SXL.

No.	Title	Length
1.	"Voice of Thunder"	21:51
2.	"Speed of Light"	22:27

== Personnel ==
SXL

- Aïyb Dieng – percussion
- Ronald Shannon Jackson – drums
- Bill Laswell – bass guitar
- SamulNori – percussion
- L. Shankar – violin, voice

Technical

- Robert Musso – producer
- Robbie Norris – assistant engineer
- Howie Weinberg – mastering

== Release history ==
Region	Date	Label	Format	Catalog
Germany	1988	Enemy	LP	EMY 106
Japan	1988	Celluloid	CD	CELD 5017
