= Taboo (Ronald Shannon Jackson album) =

Studio album by Ronald Shannon Jackson
- Released: 1990
- Genre: Jazz
- Label: Venture
- Producers: Bill Laswell, Ronald Shannon Jackson

Ronald Shannon Jackson chronology
Red Warrior (1990)	Taboo (1990)	Raven Roc (1992)

Taboo is an album by the American musician Ronald Shannon Jackson. It was released by Venture Records in 1990. Jackson supported the album with concert appearances in the UK.

== Production ==
Recorded in the mid-1980s, the album was coproduced by Bill Laswell. Vernon Reid played guitar on all of the tracks. Jackson employed two bass players and a horn section.

== Critical reception ==
Professional ratings
Review scores
Source	Rating
AllMusic	3/5 stars
Calgary Herald	C+
Robert Christgau	B+
Los Angeles Times	3/4 stars
The Rolling Stone Album Guide	3/5 stars

The Calgary Herald wrote that the "generous use of horns—and Vernon Reid's smooth guitar—keep it all together while Jackson teaches a lesson in what can be done with percussion." The Edmonton Journal said that, "tight, up front, or in behind he is always trying something, maybe just in response to the bright Coleman-style discord of the band... Sax and guitar take their own stretch with a jazzy message." Robert Christgau opined that the "first side's a suite that'll string you along but good—kind of like Mingus, so to speak." The Los Angeles Times stated that "high horns playing Middle Eastern-tinged melodies over bubbling bass and limber, forceful drumming." The Guardian praised the "deliciously full ensemble thrashes."

== In other media ==
"Challenge to Manhood" and "Taboo" appear on a mixtape compiled by the title character of the Alan Warner novel Morvern Callar.

== Track listing ==
No.	Title	Length
1.	"Mental Holiday": a. "Vacating the Body"; b. "Ain't Supposed to Be"; c. "No Routines"; d. "Forgive Me"; e. "Be Back Shortly"
2.	"Taboo"
3.	"Mothers and Sons"
4.	"Challenge to Manhood"
5.	"Little Things That Count"
