= Iron Path =

Studio album by Last Exit
- Released: 1988
- Studio: B.C. Studio, Brooklyn, NY
- Genre: Free jazz
- Length: 36:47
- Label: Venture/Virgin (original release); ESP-Disk (2015 reissue)
- Producer: Last Exit, Bill Laswell

Last Exit chronology
Cassette Recordings '87 (1987)	Iron Path (1988)	Best of Live (1990)

Iron Path is the only studio album by the free jazz band Last Exit. It was released in 1988 on Venture and Virgin Records.

== Reception ==
Professional ratings
Review scores
Source	Rating
AllMusic	4/5 stars
Vice	A−
The Penguin Guide to Jazz	3.5/4 stars
All About Jazz	4.5/5 stars

In a review for Allmusic, John Dougan wrote: "Using the studio to their advantage, Last Exit explores sonic texture on 'Prayer' and 'The Fire Drum,' but never loses sight of the power and energy that makes their live recordings so memorable. If you were to have one Last Exit recording, this might well be the one."

Writing for Trouser Press, Greg Kot stated: "Last Exit’s sole studio recording... introduces a less frantic direction, with more value placed on the space between notes. The compositions impose a thin veneer of structure... Some of the more textured pieces at times suggest King Crimson at its most venturesome."

Robert Christgau commented: "There's a shape and specific gravity to these 10 sub-five-minute tracks that I attribute to Laswell, who's always specialized in getting legible music out of the avant fringe, and a life force I attribute to Jackson even more than Sharrock--solid as the music is, he never stops bubbling under."

In a review for All About Jazz, Mark Corroto remarked: "Iron Path... is the clearest statement the band produced... These ten shortish studio pieces... weave between Oriental themes, surf-metal, speed metal blues, floppy funk, and hardcore thunder. Sharrock, who passed away in 1994, displays the talent that was coveted by the likes of Miles Davis and Pharoah Sanders, and Brotzmann is eternally Brotzmann, blowing an ocean liner horn from his baritone or tearing chunks of tenor madness first heard on his Machine Gun sessions. Sadly, Jackson is also gone, like Sharrock, his free jazz voice never duplicated."

Referencing the Metallica album, Chuck Eddy, writing for Spin, stated: "This is how And Justice for All oughta sound, if Metallica hadn't gone and turned into Klaatu instead. Except Metallica never shook half this hard."

In a review for Elsewhere, Graham Reid wrote: "Iron Path was damaging, incendiary noise, and you would not want to subject you sensitive ears to the assault that is 'Devil's Rain'... which sounds just right for Sonic Youth fans... Iron Path is a bawdy, bellicose, wildly swinging brawler of an album... it is what is, and wasn't polite at the time. Or even is now."

== Track listing ==
All music is composed by Peter Brötzmann, Ronald Shannon Jackson, Bill Laswell, Sonny Sharrock.

No.	Title	Length
1.	"Prayer"	4:37
2.	"Iron Path"	3:28
3.	"The Black Bat"	4:33
4.	"Marked for Death"	2:19
5.	"The Fire Drum"	4:18
6.	"Detonator"	3:47
7.	"Sand Dancer"	1:56
8.	"Cut and Run"	2:30
9.	"Eye for an Eye"	4:54
10.	"Devil's Rain"	4:12

== Personnel ==
Last Exit

- Peter Brötzmann – bass saxophone
- Ronald Shannon Jackson – drums
- Bill Laswell – Fender 6-string bass, producer
- Sonny Sharrock – guitar

Technical

- Martin Bisi – engineering
- Last Exit – producer
- Thi-Linh Le – photography, design
- Howie Weinberg – mastering

== Release history ==
Region	Date	Label	Format	Catalog
United Kingdom	1988	Venture, Virgin	CD, LP	VE 38
United States	1988	Venture, Virgin	CD, LP	7 91015
United Kingdom	2015	ESP-Disk	CD, LP	ESP 4075
