= SXL (band) =

1980s jazz fusion ensemble

- Genres: Jazz fusion
- Years active: 1987–1988
- Labels: Celluloid, Enemy
- Past members: Aïyb Dieng; Ronald Shannon Jackson; Bill Laswell; SamulNori; L. Shankar

SXL was a jazz fusion ensemble, formed in 1987 by composer Bill Laswell. The nucleus also comprised musicians Aïyb Dieng, Ronald Shannon Jackson, and L. Shankar with SamulNori, the internationally renowned South Korean percussion quartet. Their loosely structured music was built on a combination of Indian drones, funk music and densely layered percussion.

== History ==
Bill Laswell desired to explore a fusion of funk and world music. The musical supergroup was conceived to perform a series of live performances in Japan from July to August 1987. Composer and keyboardist Ryuichi Sakamoto was also booked to play in the group but dropped from the project shortly before the tour. Their concerts between the first and second of August attracted a combined audience of 30,000. These performances were recorded and would comprise their debut album Live in Japan, released in 1987. High praise for the performances was given by Jazz Forum magazine, who said, "whatever readers may think they know about the chequered history of culture fusion they have not heard anything remotely like the results of this counterbalancing of free improvising, time playing and ethnic traditional elements." After the tour, Samulnori released their debut album Record of Changes in 1988, which was produced by Laswell and devoted to shaman music.

== Discography ==
Live albums

- SXL Live in Japan (CBS/Sony Japan, 1987)
- Into the Outlands (Celluloid/Enemy, 1988)
