= Red Yaguareté =

Argentine non-profit organization

Jaguar, Panthera onca

Red Yaguareté (Yaguareté Net) is a non-profit organization of Argentina devoted to the conservation of the jaguar or "yaguarete" and its natural habitats in that country.

== Goals ==
Its main goals are conservation management, research, protection, combating poaching and education and information programs.

== Structure ==
It is financed exclusively by donations from contributors from many countries. It does not accept donations from corporations to avoid compromises.

It maintains a database of sightings, conflicts, cases of illegal hunting. It is the only nongovernmental organization devoted to penalizing those who kill jaguars.

== The jaguar in Argentina ==
Originally it spread across the north and center of the country. Nowadays the distribution is more limited. It is found only in six northern provinces: Salta, Jujuy, Chaco, Formosa, Santiago del Estero and Misiones.

Red Yaguareté calculates that there are around 250 live specimens in the remnants of subtropical forest of the country and considers that it is urgent to take measures to ensure its survival.

== See also ==
- Jaguar Conservation Fund
