= Jaguar Conservation Fund =

- Established: 2002 (24 years ago)

The Jaguar Conservation Fund (JCF), known in Portuguese as Instituto Onça-Pintada (IOP), was founded in June 2002 by a group of researchers with a strong background of work dedicated to the species. Its mission is "To promote the conservation of the jaguar, its natural prey and habitat throughout the species' geographical range, as well as its peaceful coexistence with man, through research and conservation strategies". The largest part (48%) of the jaguar's geographical distribution, which extends from northern Argentina to the southwestern United States, lies within Brazil. However, although nationally considered endangered, until the foundation of the JCF few programs focusing on conservation of the species existed. Today, JCF is the only Brazilian NGO (non-governmental organization) devoted exclusively to promoting the conservation of the jaguar. It is currently implementing scientific research in four Brazilian biomes (Amazon, Cerrado, Caatinga and Pantanal) and supports partner organizations in the Atlantic Forest. Research topics include long-term population monitoring programs for jaguars and their main prey species, and management programs to solve the conflict between the predator and livestock ranchers. Additionally, JCF's projects of cultural, educational and social character contribute to conservation of the jaguar, biodiversity, and to reduction of the effects of global warming. In order to facilitate contact between non-Brazilian supporters/sponsors and JCF activities in Brazil, the Jaguar Conservation Fund –US was founded in 2004 as a 501(c)(3) non-profit organization.

== Controversy ==
In 2022 an IBAMA report showed that between 72 and 125 animals under the institute's care died by "negligence or incompetence" in the last seven years; among them, 52 are from endangered species - the institute considered that three times more animals die than are born at the Jaguar Institute.

The fine was R$452 thousand (US$115,000), in addition to the embargo of the "activities of visitation, receipt, destination, disposal (with any justification) and reproduction of specimens until the presentation of appropriate conservation projects." IBAMA also considers inappropriate the exhibition of animals aiming at financial advantage carried out by the JCF, something forbidden by Conama resolution No. 489/18.

In response, the NGO representatives said that the "assessment deserves to be annulled due to "several formal and procedural defects that tarnish it" and that it would not be possible to attribute the deaths to any "negligence, imprudence or unskillfulness". In a note from JCF, they showed surprise at receiving a fine from an "...IBAMA inspector, who was never in person at our facilities." The IOP has already presented its defense to IBAMA.

== See also ==
- Red Yaguarete
