= Akira Sakata =

Japanese jazz saxophonist, actor, researcher (born 1945)

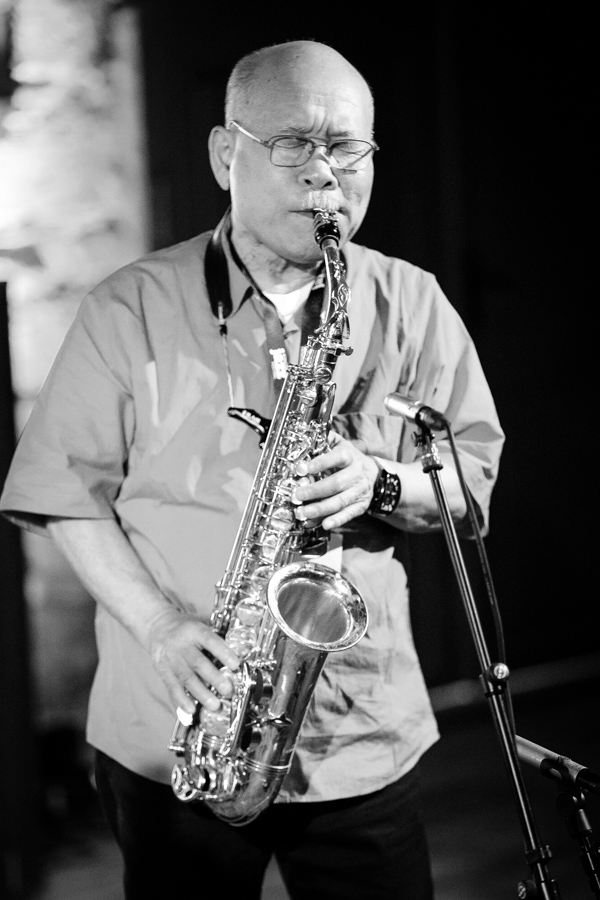
- Akira Sakata performing in 2018

Background information
- Born: February 21, 1945 (age 80); Hiroshima, Japan
- Genres: Jazz
- Occupation: Musician
- Instrument: Saxophone
- Website: akira-sakata.com/english

Akira Sakata (born 21 February 1945) is a Japanese free jazz saxophonist.

== Early life ==
Sakata was born in Kure, Hiroshima on 21 February 1945. He first heard jazz on short-wave radio and Voice of America, then became more interested in it from listening to film soundtracks. He began studying music seriously at high school, where he played clarinet. He played alto sax in a jazz band when at Hiroshima University. He trained as a marine biologist and moved to Tokyo in 1969.

== Later life and career ==
Sakata was with the Yamashita Yosuke Trio from 1972 to 1979 and toured internationally with them. In 1986, he performed with Last Exit with Bill Laswell. This performance was released as The Noise of Trouble: Live in Tokyo. Laswell went on to play bass on and produce Sakata albums such as Mooko, Silent Plankton and Fisherman's.com, the last of which also featured Pete Cosey (who had worked with Miles Davis) on guitar. He later worked with DJ Krush and Chikamorachi (Darin Gray and Chris Corsano).

Sakata's career nearly ended in 2002, when he had a brain haemorrhage. He had to relearn the saxophone and returned to performing after three months, but still had some remaining restrictions years later. He is also a television and film actor, as well as being a writer. "He has created a language of his own which sounds very funny to Japanese listeners and which he uses extensively in his publications and in his appearances as an actor".

== Playing style ==
"His deep commitment to the music is always evident in his playing, as is his humor. In concert, he will occasionally put down his saxophone and simply make vocal sounds into the microphone, the effect of which is often both humorous and musical."

== Discography ==
=== As leader ===
- Counter Clockwise Trip (Frasco, 1975)
- Peking (Frasco, 1977)
- 20 Personalities/Akira Sakata Sings (Better Days, 1980)
- Dance (Enja, 1981)
- 4 O'Clock (Better Days, 1981)
- Da-Da-Da (VariBori, 1985)
- Mookoo (NEC Avenue, 1988)
- Silent Plankton (Tokuma, 1990)
- Nano Space Odyssey (NEC Avenue, 1992)
- Friendly Pants (Family Vineyard, 2009)
- ...And That's the Story of Jazz (Family Vineyard, 2011)
- Soro Wo Tobu (King, 2012)
- Flying Basket (Family Vineyard, 2015)
- Proton Pump (Family Vineyard, 2018)
- Not Seeing Is a Flower (Leo, 2018)
