= Japan Chernobyl Foundation =

Japanese non-profit organization

- JCF
- Formation: 1991
- Type: Nonprofit organization
- Location: Japan
- Chairman: Minoru Kamata

The Japan Chernobyl Foundation (JCF) is an officially-approved Japanese non-profit organization, dedicated to providing humanitarian aid, largely through medical care to children with leukemia and other illnesses. Established in 1991, the foundation initially provided medical support to Ukrainian and Belarusian victims of the Chernobyl disaster. Since the 2022 Russian invasion of Ukraine, JCF has worked with international colleagues to provide aid to Ukrainian evacuees. JCF has also been active in providing medical and humanitarian aid in Iraq since 2004, as well as in Japan in the aftermath of the 2011 Tōhoku earthquake and tsunami, and the Fukushima Daiichi nuclear disaster of 2011. The headquarters of the Japan Chernobyl Foundation are in Matsumoto, Nagano, Japan. The current JCF Chairman is Dr. Minoru Kamata.

== History and activities ==
The Japan Chernobyl Foundation was founded in January 1991 in Matsumoto, Nagano, Japan, under the name Nihon Cherunobuiri Rentai Kikin, or Japan Chernobyl Foundation (JCF), with the primary objective of providing medical support to victims of the 1986 disaster at the Chernobyl Nuclear Power Plant. The foundation has been particularly active in supporting screening, research and treatment for pediatric leukemia and thyroid cancer in cooperation with medical professionals at Shinshu University, the National Thyroid Cancer Center in Minsk, and the Gomel State Hospital.

In 2004, JCF began providing medical aid in Iraq, focusing primarily on pediatric oncology. The foundation has sponsored cytotoxic therapy for children with cancer, as well as blood bank services through the donation of cell separator machines. The foundation has also offered training courses for pediatric oncology staff at sites outside Iraq. With financial support from the Kirin Brewery company, JCF was also able to provide specific medical supplies, such as leukocytosis factor agents for chemotherapy, to Iraq's Central Teaching Hospital and to the Mansour Children's Welfare Teaching Hospital. Through its concurrent affiliation with the Japan-Iraq Medical Network (JIM-NET), JCF continues to help save the lives of Iraqi children with leukemia.

Following the March 11, 2011, Tohoku earthquake and tsunami, which resulted in great damage along the north-eastern coast of Japan, and the subsequent nuclear accident at the Fukushima Daiichi nuclear plant, JCF staff have worked to check radiation levels in affected areas and to monitor foods from the region. With aid from the Shinshu University School of Medicine, the foundation has also been able to monitor blood radiation levels and watch for signs of thyroid cancer and leukemia in children, as well as provide psychological care.

In 2014, after the deterioration of the national security situation in Iraq and the ISIS occupation of Mosul and other Iraqi governorates, JCF launched a new initiative in Iraq to provide medical aid to refugees and other internally displaced people (IDP). The Mart-Shmuni Clinic has been sponsored by JCF since November 2014, with additional help from the government of Japan since March 2015. The initial Mart-Shmuni Clinic was simply a tent, staffed by doctors from among the IDP themselves. Subsequent JCF donation drives have provided sufficient support to establish a proper clinic and provide medicine and other supplies. Between 2015 and 2018, JCF helped establish 5 primary healthcare centers (PHCs) in the vicinity of Erbil, capital of the Kurdistan Region in the north of Iraq: Harsham, Zerin, Zeitoun, Topzawa, and Altun Kupri. Through a grant from the Japanese government, JCF has been able to provide medical equipment to the Harsham PHC. JCF has also supplied much-needed equipment to other Erbil-area PHCs and, thus, helped provide for medical service to thousands of internally displaced persons (IDPs) in the region since the ISIS occupation. In addition, JCF has provided endoscopy equipment and medicine to other nearby hospitals, and has sponsored health-related lectures by JCF doctors visiting Iraq. On the occasion of the Mosul liberation from ISIS in 2017, JCF provided equipment for surgical facilities at the Rojawa Emergency Hospital in Erbil, and in 2020 JCF helped establish the first flow cytometry unit in Mosul at Ibn Al-Atheer Hospital. Other JCF projects have included a training program in Japan for Iraqi doctors, particularly for those specializing in pediatric oncology, hematology and related fields; a training program for nurses in pediatric oncology at Ibn Al-Atheer Hospital following the liberation of Mosul from ISIS; assistance to a displaced Yazidi-minority medical student for completion of medical studies; and various forms of aid and support for individual victims of ISIS.

In the decades since the 1986 Chernobyl disaster, JCF has developed many friendly contacts in Ukraine and in neighboring countries which proved invaluable following the 2022 Russian invasion of Ukraine. In particular, JCF has worked with the Catholic priest Bohdan Savula of Horyanska Rotunda/St. Anna Church in Uzhhorod, Ukraine, and the artist Masakazu Miyanaga of Krakow, Poland, in order to provide aid to Ukrainian evacuees. Donations from Japan are used to help purchase food, clothing, water and other necessities.

JCF Chairman, Dr. Minoru Kamata, and other JCF-affiliated doctors, nurses and staff members, have made numerous visits to Iraq to provide aid. In addition, one JCF member has been working continually on site with local doctors in Erbil, Iraq, to monitor progress of the project and assess clinical needs.

== Publication ==
Ground Zero, a quarterly publication, is the official journal of JCF. The journal details foundation activities through interviews and feature stories from disaster areas, and illustrates the role of JCF in working to solve relevant regional issues.
