= Last Exit (free jazz band) =

American free jazz supergroup

- Origin: United States, Germany
- Genres: Free jazz Free improvisation Experimental music Noise music Punk jazz
- Years active: 1986–1994
- Past members: Sonny Sharrock; Peter Brötzmann; Ronald Shannon Jackson; Bill Laswell

Last Exit was an American free jazz supergroup, composed of electric guitarist Sonny Sharrock, drummer/occasional vocalist Ronald Shannon Jackson, saxophonist Peter Brötzmann, and bass guitarist Bill Laswell. They were active from 1986 to the early 1990s, releasing primarily live albums recorded in Europe. Sharrock's death in 1994 caused the dissolution of the band, though touring of the band had not occurred for several years before his demise. The band is unrelated to the 1970s British jazz fusion band of the same name.

== History ==
The band was known for its uncompromising musical ferocity, fueled by the band members' confrontational attitudes. Greg Kot wrote that they brought a level of "volume and violence that makes most rock bands sound tame." Their music was largely improvised; John Dugan wrote "Granted, one person's free improvisation is another's tuneless chaos, but Last Exit, due primarily to the skill of its individuals, only infrequently fell off the precipice into the netherworld of arty wanking ... The playing is intricate, wildly adventurous, frequently funny, and, perhaps most important, a tribute to musical democracy in action."

Far louder than most jazz bands (even than most free jazz groups) Last Exit found a modest following among some more open-minded hardcore punk fans. The band released five live albums, one of which contains guest appearances from Herbie Hancock and Akira Sakata. Most of their albums were released on Enemy Records, but the band's sole studio effort, Iron Path, was released on Venture, a sublabel of Virgin Records. Enhanced by Laswell's studio atmospherics, Iron Path found the band somewhat more restrained. It contains less of their blistering live sound, focusing more on studio textures and experiments.

Most of Last Exit's albums have been out of print for years; however, in 2005, Atavistic Records's Unheard Music Series reissued Köln. The material heard on Köln was actually recorded in Germany on February 12, 1986, four days before the Paris concert that was recorded for the release issued, as their self-titled debut album.

== Discography ==
=== Studio album ===
- Iron Path (1988), reissued in 2015

=== Live albums ===
- Last Exit (1986)
- The Noise of Trouble: Live in Tokyo (1986)
- Cassette Recordings '87 (reissued in 1995 as From The Board) (1988)
- Köln (1990)
- Headfirst into the Flames: Live in Europe (1993)

=== Compilation albums ===
- The Best of Last Exit (1990)
- Featured on Live At The Knitting Factory, Vol. 4 (1990)
