= Jimi Hazel =

American guitarist

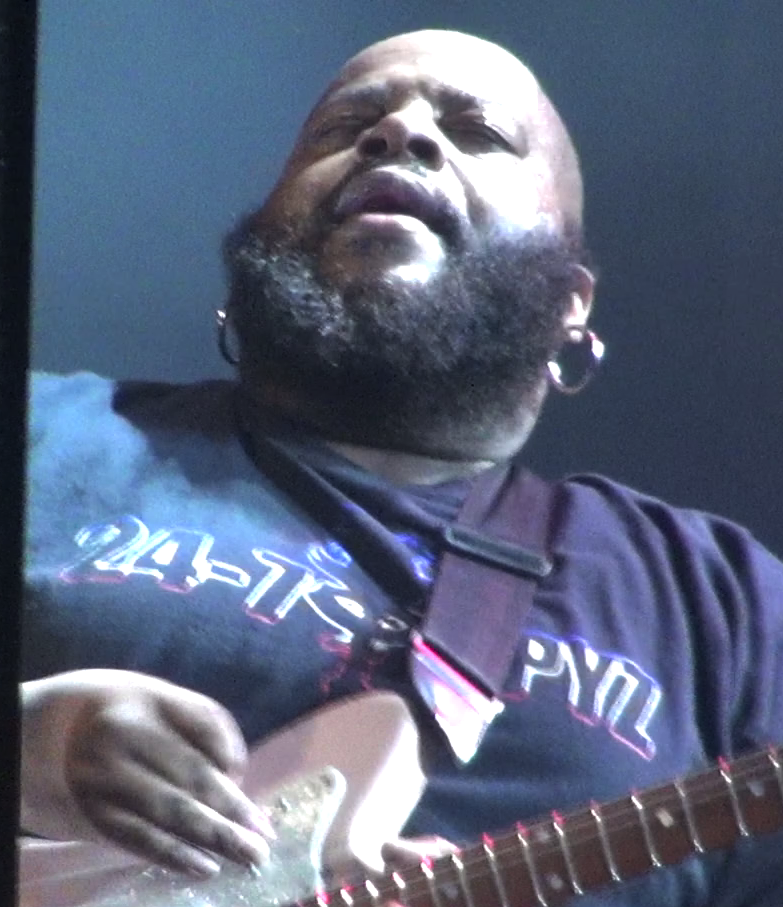
Jimi Hazel of 24-7 Spyz playing guitar

Jimi Hazel is an American guitarist, who was born in the Bronx, New York City. He gets his name from his guitar idols, Jimi Hendrix and Eddie Hazel. He was childhood friends with Ronny Drayton, who joined the group Hazel founded, 24-7 Spyz. In 2009, Hazel formed a supergroup with Doug Pinnick of King's X, and members of Fishbone. In April 2002, he released a solo album, 21stCenturySouthBronxRockStar.
