= Fender Bass VI =

Electric bass

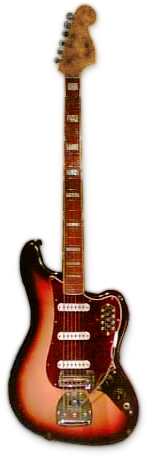
- Manufacturer: Fender
- Period: 1961–1975, 1995–1998, 2006–2008, 2013–present

Construction
- Body type: Solid
- Neck joint: Bolt-on
- Scale: 30"

Woods
- Body: Alder
- Neck: Maple, C-shaped
- Fretboard: Rosewood or Maple

Hardware
- Bridge: Vintage-style "floating" tremolo with tremolo lock button
- Pickup(s): 3 single coil, originally Strat style, Custom Jaguar from 1963

The Fender Bass VI, originally known as the Fender VI, is a six-string electric bass guitar made by Fender. The instrument is tuned an octave below a standard electric guitar.

== Design concept and history ==
The Fender VI was released in 1961 and followed the concept of the Danelectro six-string bass released in 1956, having six strings tuned E1 to E3, an octave below the Spanish guitar. The Bass VI was closely related to the Fender Jaguar, with which it shared styling and technical details, notably the Fender floating tremolo. The VI had an offset body similar but not identical to that of the Jazzmaster/Jaguar.

It departed from the concept of the Fender Precision Bass in having six strings, a shorter scale and thinner strings, and a mechanical vibrato arm. The Bass VI never caught on to the extent that the four-string Precision Bass and its derivatives did. The model was discontinued in 1975.

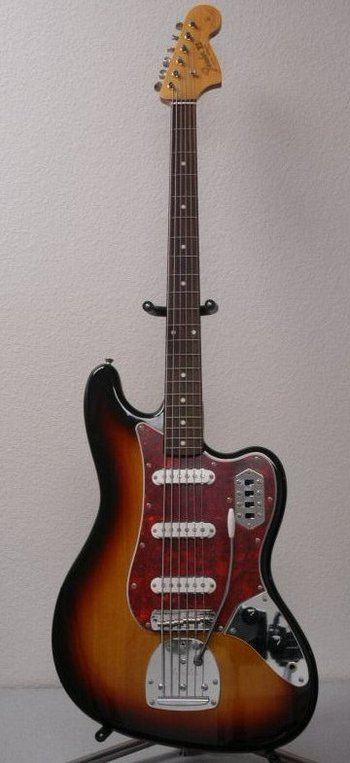

=== Reissue ===
From 1995 through 1998, Fender Japan produced a vintage reissue featuring the 1963 model's Jaguar-style pickups and electronics.

The Fender Custom Shop reissued a similar model from 2006 through 2008.

In 2013, Fender released a Bass VI model as part of its Pawn Shop series. In line with the series' purpose to reconfigure classic Fender designs, this version of the Bass VI has a Jazzmaster-type humbucking bridge pickup and a Stratocaster-style five-position pickup selector, as opposed to separate switches. There are three available colors: brown sunburst with a tortoiseshell pickguard, black with a tortoiseshell pickguard, and candy-apple red with a white pickguard and painted headstock.

Also in 2013, Squier released a Bass VI as part of the Vintage Modified series. This model was similar to the traditional Bass VI design with four switches (on/off for each pickup and a "strangle" (low-cut filter) switch) and a Jaguar-style control plate. It featured a synthetic bone nut, rosewood fingerboard until 2018, medium jumbo frets, chrome hardware, alnico custom single-coil Jaguar pickups with claw, and continued the trend set by the Squier Vintage Modified Jaguars and Jazzmasters of having a non-locking tremolo plate. It was available in three-color sunburst finish with 4-ply tortoiseshell pickguard, Olympic White with a brown tortoiseshell pickguard, and black with a white three-ply pickguard.

In 2019, Squier released its Classic Vibe Bass VI, available in three-color sunburst and black, both with tortoiseshell pickguard. It has a slightly wider width at the nut than the Vintage Modified Bass VI (1.685" vs. 1.65"). The nut was upgraded to bone and the Indian laurel fretboard is equipped with narrow, tall frets. The pickup specs were changed to Fender-designed alnico single-coil pickups while retaining classic Jaguar claw shielding rings and the hardware was switched to nickel. The logo was also changed, from black to gold with black outline. The bridge is an upgraded design. Most of the other remaining features are similar to the Vintage Modified model.

In 2023, Fender released a Bass VI model under the Vintera II series. Unlike the Pawn Shop version, the Vintera II 60s Bass VI is built to resemble the traditional 60s Bass VI with Alder body, Maple neck with Rosewood fretboard. The Vintera II 60s Bass VI is available in Fiesta Red & Lake Placid Blue.

== Specifications ==
Fender Bass VI string set.

Like other Fenders of the time, the Fender VI had a 7.25-inch fingerboard radius. The Fender VI, along with the Jaguar, the Jazzmaster and the Electric XII, was given a cream/white-bound fretboard with rectangular pearloid block inlays in 1967, followed by a thicker black CBS-style headstock decal and polyester finishes instead of nitrocellulose lacquer in 1968. In 1970, as with the other Fender basses in production at the time (excluding the Precision Bass), the Bass VI was also offered with a black-bound Maple neck with black rectangular block inlays.

- Solid body (alder) fretted electric bass guitar, six strings in six courses tuned E-A-D-G-B-E an octave below the standard guitar tuning. The Bass VI reads in treble Clef but it sounds 2 Octaves lower than written.
- Scale length 30" / 762 mm (as opposed to 34" / 864 mm for the Jazz and Precision basses) for the U.S. versions, 30.3" for the Japanese versions.
- Curved fingerboard (rosewood), radius 7.25" / 184 mm, 21 frets
- Standard strings .100 .080 .065 .044 .034 .024 inches, Fender Nickel Wound, P/N 073–5350–000.
- Fender floating bridge and Fender Jaguar/Jazzmaster-style tremolo arm.
- (1961–1975 and in select reissues) Fender Mute

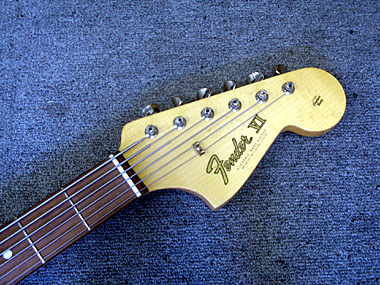
Bass VI Headstock

=== Electronics ===
The original-issue Bass VI had three Jaguar-style single coil pickups (with the Magnetic Field Accumulators used on the Jaguar guitar-pickups), controlled by a panel of three (later four) slider switches (rather than the conventional three-position switch): three individual pickup on/off switches, plus (from late 1962) the Jaguar-type 'low-frequency-attenuating' (high-pass) filter.

When the Fender Jaguar was released in 1962, it used the Jazzmaster body with its unusual lead/rhythm electrics and the floating tremolo, but with a short scale-length neck, the Bass VI switch panel and two unique "toothed" pickups. Having only two pickups to control, the Jaguar's third slider switch served as a bass cut switch.

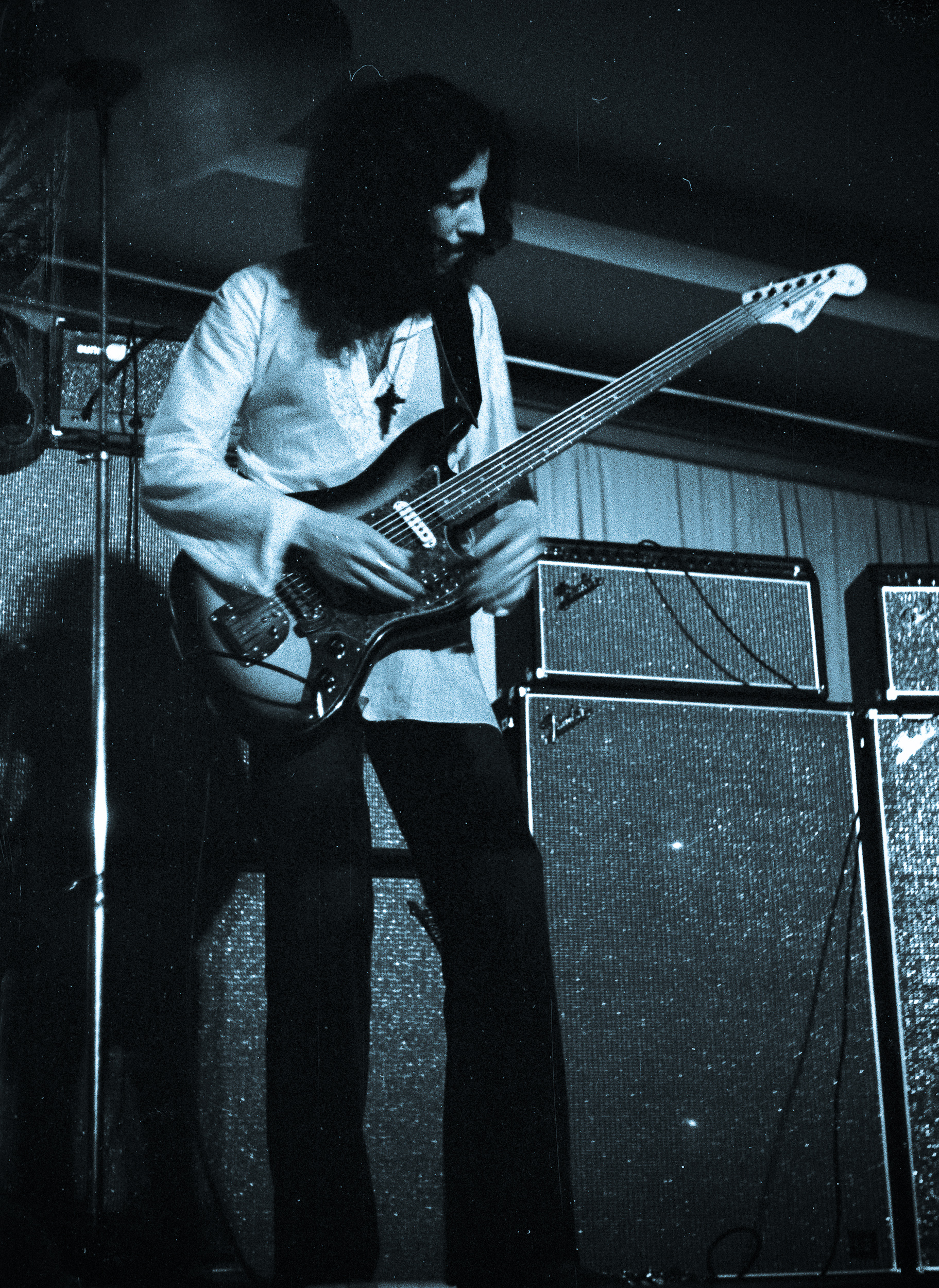
Peter Green using the Bass VI while in Fleetwood Mac

In 1963, the Bass VI electronics were revised to incorporate some features from the Jaguar, with the adoption of toothed pickups and the addition of a fourth slider switch to provide bass-cut. This remained the setup of the Bass VI throughout its remaining 12 years of continuous production.

Electronics mentioned above were all passive electronics.

- Three pickup on/off slider switches.
- Tone control slider switch (bass cut-off) (not on very early models).
- Volume control potentiometer.
- Tone control (treble cut-off) potentiometer.

== Reviews ==
Brian Molko and Stefan Olsdal of Placebo play Fender Bass VIs, with Molko saying, "Playing the Fender VI is like playing two instruments in one, it can be treated as a guitar and as a bass."

== Notable users and appearances ==
- Roy Babbington, Soft Machine
- The Beatles: George Harrison and John Lennon, on tracks where bassist Paul McCartney plays either piano or guitar on The White Album, Abbey Road and Let It Be
- Jack Bruce, Cream
- Henk Bruysten, Hank the Knife and the Jets
- Glen Campbell
- Rick Danko, The Hawks, The Band
- John Entwistle, The Who
- John Frusciante, Red Hot Chili Peppers
- Graham Gouldman, 10cc
- Josh Klinghoffer, Red Hot Chili Peppers
- Peter Green (Fleetwood Mac) - for example, live version of "The Green Manalishi (With the Two Prong Crown)" on Live In Boston
- Robin Guthrie, Cocteau Twins
- Jet Harris, The Shadows - Harris was likely the first musician in Great Britain/Europe who owned a Bass VI.
- Eric Haydock, The Hollies
- John Paul Jones
- Steve Kilbey, The Church
- Doug McCombs, Tortoise, Brokeback
- Joe Perry, Aerosmith - Perry used a Bass VI to record "Back in the Saddle" on Aerosmith's 1976 album Rocks.
- Placebo, Stefan Olsdal and Brian Molko
- Noel Redding, The Jimi Hendrix Experience.
- Gustavo Santaolalla: The music of the 2013 video game The Last of Us. Santaolalla scored the themes of the protagonist Joel with the instrument.
- Robert Smith, The Cure
- The Tielman Brothers, Reggy Tielman and Robby Latuperisa. The Tielman Brothers were probably the first band on the European mainland that used the instrument.
- Nigel Tufnel (played by Christopher Guest), in the film This Is Spinal Tap, owns a Fender Bass VI which he refuses to play, or even allow others to look at
- Ted Nugent
- Roy Wood, The Move.

== Literature ==
- Bertges, Peter (2007). The Fender Reference. Saarbrücken: Bomots. ISBN 978-3-939316-38-1.
