= It's Not Up to Us =

Studio album by Byard Lancaster
- Released: 1968
- Recorded: December 8, 1966
- Genre: Jazz
- Length: 41:41
- Label: Vortex; 2003
- Producer: Joel Dorn

Byard Lancaster chronology
It's Not Up to Us (1968)	Live at Macalester College (1972)

It's Not Up to Us is the debut album by saxophonist/flautist Byard Lancaster released in 1968 on the Vortex label, an Atlantic subsidiary.

== Reception ==
Professional ratings
Review scores
Source	Rating
AllMusic	4.5/5 stars
Pitchfork	8.0
The Penguin Guide to Jazz Recordings	3/4 stars

The AllMusic review by Michael G. Nastos called it "A rare recording". On All About Jazz, Jason Verhagen noted "Lancaster is a very important musical entity and also very unspoken – his work with Sun Ra, Philly Joe Jones, Sunny Murray, Larry Young and Fred Hopkins didn't exactly make him a superstar (he would often perform on Philadelphian street corners). ... Lancaster's "new jazz" movement, with the help of Sonny Sharrock on guitar, paved a way through the embrace of rock, folk and classical during the '70s". Pitchfork's Andy Beta stated "What strikes me first is the overall melodic sensibility of each of the players. Lancaster, on alto sax and flute, would go on to play with outsider luminaries like Sun Ra, Bill Dixon, and Fred Hopkins. Sharrock's violently strummed strings on Black Woman and Monkey-Pockie-Boo led to the vortices of Sonic Youth, Fugazi, and pretty much all future physical guitarists. Eric Gravatt would soon join an early version of Weather Report, yet everyone defers their skronkier, unrestrained abilities to the overall structure of each tune. This gives the Anglo folk base of some of Lancaster's compositions plenty room to be heard and hummed". In The Japan Times Tom Bojko wrote "There are several reasons to buy this re-release. The first, of course, is because it contains a wide range of outstanding music. From the jaunty, plaintive flute lines of the title track to the abstract rendition of "Over the Rainbow" and the aggressive guitar trills of the album's dark conclusion, "Satan," every note rings with honesty. The second reason is that it's an education in the evolution of studio tools as compositional devices. Here and there are deep washes of reverb, and Lancaster's horn occasionally surprises the ears by panning and fading. The effects are tasteful and subtle but – given the times – radical, nonetheless".

== Track listing ==
All compositions by Byard Lancaster except as indicated

1. "It's Not Up to Us" – 4:46
2. "Last Summer" – 3:21
3. "Misty" (Erroll Garner, Johnny Burke) – 4:59
4. "John's Children" (Warren Sharrock) – 6:01
5. "Mr. A.A." – 4:13
6. "Dogtown" – 4:03
7. "Over the Rainbow" (Harold Arlen, Yip Harburg) – 4:28
8. "Satan" (Jerome Hunter, Lancaster, Sharrock) – 8:54

== Personnel ==
- Byard Lancaster – alto saxophone, flute
- Warren Sharrock – guitar
- Jerome Hunter – bass, Fender bass
- Eric Gravatt – drums
- Kenny Speller – congas
