= J. R. Mitchell =

American drummer

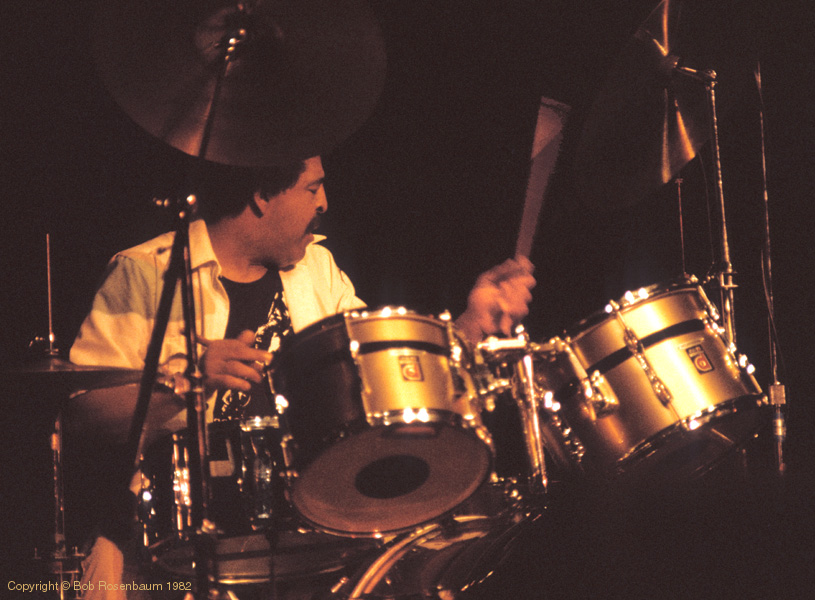
- J. R. Mitchell, Kool Jazz Festival, New York 1982

Background information
- Also known as: Phumelela
- Born: James Roland Mitchell; April 13, 1937; Philadelphia, Pennsylvania, U.S.
- Died: January 25, 2004 (aged 66) New York, New York, U.S.
- Genres: Jazz
- Occupations: Drummer, Composer, Percussionist
- Instruments: Drums, Congas, Piano
- Years active: 1960–2004
- Labels: Dogtown, Doria, CIMP

James Roland "J. R." Mitchell (April 13, 1937 – January 25, 2004) was an American jazz drummer and educator who sought to promote awareness of the African American music experience. In the early 1980s, jazz journalist and Washington Post music critic W. Royal Stokes wrote, "J. R. Mitchell is the renaissance man of jazz."

== Biography ==
=== Youth and early life ===
J. R. Mitchell was born April 13, 1937, to a family of five in Philadelphia, Pennsylvania. At age 15, Mitchell began studying percussion at Music City in Philadelphia, under Paul Patterson. After high school, he entered the U.S. Marines, and while in the service in North Carolina, he associated with many musicians from Detroit. Completing his military service in 1958, Mitchell entered Combs College of Music and graduated with a bachelor's degree in Applied Instruments (percussion) and Music Education. He continued his studies at Temple University in orchestration, arranging and conduction, performing with the Olney Symphony Orchestra.

=== Jazz Educator ===
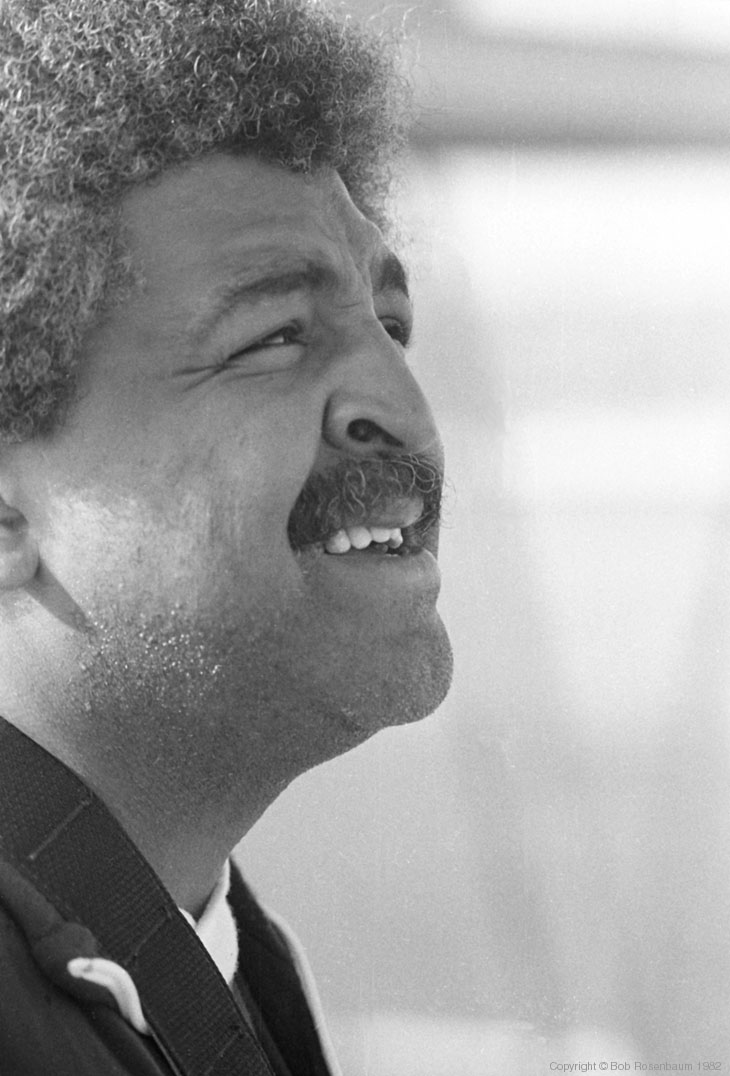

Awarded a scholarship to the Berklee College of Music, he studied piano and arranging there with Dean Earl and Dick Wright. Mitchell continued his education at the New England Conservatory of Music, studying under Jaki Byard (who became a close friend and musical associate), George Russell and Gunther Schuller, and received a master's degree in composition. Subsequently, on a scholarship to the Bennington College Summer Program, he worked with Mr. Byard, Avery Collor, Ken McIntyre, Ernie Wilkins and Beaver Harris. Mitchell also studied music marketing at New York University, as well as ethnomusicology, music of the Middle East and of India at Hunter College.

In 1979, Mitchell became associate professor in the Department of Music and Black Studies at Ohio State University. Among numerous teaching positions, Mitchell served for five years as Director of the Jazz Studies Department and Jazz Society at Northeastern University in Boston, and as personal substitute for Archie Shepp at the University of Massachusetts in Amherst. Along with traditional instruction, Mitchell conducted seminars, lectures and workshops on jazz, ethnomusicology, and black music history at institutions such as Harvard University, Temple University, Community College of Philadelphia, Northeastern University, College of New Rochelle, University of New Mexico, State University of New York, NYU, Fordham University, and the University of Nairobi. He was an active participant in conferences and panel discussions held throughout the country on jazz, black music and social betterment.

From the 1980s until the year 2000, Mitchell traveled for numerous extended periods to countries in west and east Africa, including Senegal, Nigeria, Kenya and Ethiopia, primarily in the role of teacher, working closely with local and international institutions.

=== Main Influences ===
J. R. Mitchell was influenced in his early years by his association with Lee Morgan, Jimmy McGriff and Byard Lancaster. During his musical career, Mitchell was further influenced and associated with Jaki Byard, Walter Davis, Jr., Max Roach, Odean Pope and Fred Hopkins, among others.

=== Musical career ===
During a career that lasted almost 40 years, Mitchell performed with artists and ensembles including Andrew Hill, Archie Shepp, Arnett Cobb, Artie Simmons, Betty Carter, Bill Mitchell, Byard Lancaster, Calvin Hill, Charlie Rouse, Earl Warren, Ed Crockett, Eddie Barefield, Ernie Wilkins, Fred Hopkins, Gary Bartz, Hank Mobley, Harold Qusley, "The Skipper" Henry Franklin, Howard McGhee, Jackie McLean, Jaki Byard, James Spaulding, John Abercrombie, John Stubblefield, Justo Almario, Khan Jamal, Mario Escolero, Nina Simone, Odean Pope, Peck Morrison, Philly Joe Jones, Ray Copeland, Rahsaan Roland Kirk, Shamek Farrah, Sonelius Smith, Junior Cook, Sonny Stitt, Dan Dowling, Tommy Flanagan and Walter Davis Jr.

Starting in the mid-1980s Mitchell served as a percussionist for dance classes and performances, including Primitive Dance classes at the Ned Williams Dance School and dance classes at the Jackie Robinson YMCA in New York City.

Mitchell also composed and arranged music for various ensembles. Among his most notable compositions is the Walls of Africa Suite, inspired by his many experiences in Africa. It premiered, and was recorded, at Lincoln Center in 1982, performed by the 21-piece J. R. Mitchell Universal Orchestra. Mitchell's other compositions include "African Drums on Senegal", "McCoy T", "Ballad for Sabina", "Blues for a Beautiful Brother" and "Mov'en".

=== Entrepreneurial pursuits ===
Like Charles Mingus and Charles Tolliver, Mitchell determined that the best way to achieve recognition and distribution as an independent African American musician was to create and operate his own record label, Doria Records Inc., named after his daughter. For 25 years, Mitchell used his record label, along with his New York-based non-profit foundation Music Inn Studios, as the springboard for numerous collaborations, appearances, speaking engagements, and community activities for many artists as well as himself. Music Inn Studios served contemporary musicians and artists in areas such as public relations, contract and proposal writing, audio-visual, music recording and distribution services.

=== Community activities ===
Among Mitchell's organizational activities were membership on the Board of Directors of The Empty Foxhole Inc. in Philadelphia, Secretary of the Unification of Concerned Jazz Artists, and an association with the Jazz Museum in New York.

== Discography ==
- Live at Macalester College (Dogtown, 1972) as the J. R. Mitchell/Byard Lancaster Experience
- Live (Doria, 1978)
- Mov'en (Doria, 1982) with Byard Lancaster, Justo Almario, Bob Neloms, Calvin Hill and Jerome Hunter
- Philadelphia Spirit in New York (CIMP, 2001) with Ed Crockett, Odean Pope and Byard Lancaster
- The Outcry (Lancaster Recording, 2003) with Ed Crockett and Byard Lancaster

=== As sideman ===
With Jackie Byard

- Family Man (Muse, 1978)

With Sonny Stitt

- Deep Roots (Progressive, 1978) with Sadik Hakim
