= Jerome Hunter =

American jazz musician

- Born: January 14, 1942 (age 83); Spartanburg, South Carolina
- Citizenship: American
- Occupation: Musician

Jerome Hunter (born January 14, 1942) is an American jazz double-bassist.

== Personal life ==
Jerome learned to play guitar in his youth but switched to stand-up bass at age 12, studying formally in both classical and jazz styles. He worked early in the 1960s with Ray Bryant, Roy Haynes, and Philly Joe Jones, then moved increasingly toward free jazz, playing with Marzette Watts in 1964 and Byard Lancaster in 1966–1967. Following this he worked with Ahmed Abdullah, Dorothy Donegan, Johnny Hammond, J. R. Mitchell, Sam Rivers, Sonny Sharrock, and Grover Washington, Jr. He played with Jamaaladeen Tacuma in 1993.

== Discography ==
With Ahmed Abdullah

- Life's Force (About Time, 1979)
- Live at Ali's Alley (Cadence, 1980)

With Byard Lancaster

- It's Not Up to Us (Vortex, 1966 [1968])
- Live at Macalester College (Dogtown, 1972) with J. R. Mitchell
