= Live in New York (Sonny Sharrock album) =

Live album by Sonny Sharrock Band
- Released: 1989
- Recorded: May 14, 1989
- Venue: Knitting Factory, NYC
- Genre: Jazz
- Length: 49:27
- Label: Enemy; EMY 108
- Producer: Michael Knuth and Sonny Sharrock

Sonny Sharrock chronology
Seize the Rainbow (1987)	Live in New York (1989)	Highlife (1990)

Live in New York is a live album by American jazz guitarist Sonny Sharrock which was recorded in 1989 and released on the Enemy label.

== Reception ==
Professional ratings
Review scores
Source	Rating
AllMusic	2.5/5 stars

AllMusic awarded the album 2½ stars, stating, "If what you're after is an above-average bar band with an at times amazing guitarist and a consistently solid rhythm section, Live in New York will do just fine. Listeners who came to expect something on a more inspired level will have to content themselves with nearly contemporary albums like his solo venture (also on Enemy) or the stellar Ask the Ages".

== Track listing ==
All music is composed by Sonny Sharrock.

No.	Title	Length
1.	"Dick Dogs"	3:56
2.	"Herbie's Dance"	4:06
3.	"Elmo's Blues"	4:28
4.	"Princess Sonata"	6:18
5.	"My Song"	10:22
6.	"The Past Adventures of Zydeco Honey Cup"	5:27
7.	"Money Honey"	3:04
8.	"Dance With Me Montana"	11:46

== Personnel ==
Adapted from the Live in New York liner notes.

Musicians

- Pheeroan akLaff – drums
- Ron "The Burglar" Cartel – vocals
- Melvin Gibbs – bass guitar
- Sonny Sharrock – guitar, production
- Dave Snider – keyboards
- Abe Speller – drums

Production and additional personnel

- Michael Knuth – co-producer
- Francis Manzella – engineer

== Release history ==
Region	Date	Label	Format	Catalog
United States	1989	Enemy	CD, LP	EMY 108
