= No End =

No End may refer to:

- No End (album), 2013 album by Keith Jarrett
- No End (film), 1985 film directed by Krzysztof Kieślowski
- "Tiada Akhir" (Malay for "No End"), song by Yuna from Rouge
