= Bootsie Barnes =

American saxophonist (1937–2020)

- Birth name: Robert Manuel Barnes
- Born: November 27, 1937
- Origin: North Philadelphia, Pennsylvania, U.S.
- Died: April 22, 2020 (aged 82); Wynnewood, Pennsylvania, U.S.
- Genres: Jazz
- Instruments: Tenor saxophone

Robert "Bootsie" Barnes (November 27, 1937 – April 22, 2020) was an American jazz tenor saxophonist from Philadelphia.

== Early life and education ==
Barnes was raised in a housing project in North Philadelphia. His father was a trumpet player who performed with Bill Doggett and Frank Fairfax. His mother worked as a housekeeper. Barnes had three older brothers. His uncle, Jimmy Hamilton, was a jazz clarinetist and saxophonist. Barnes initially intended to become a drummer after being given a pair of drumsticks by Sonny Greer during a visit to the Earle Theatre. He played drums at Benjamin Franklin High School before switching to saxophone.

== Career ==
In the 1950s, Barnes played with various musicians in Philadelphia, including Lee Morgan, Philly Joe Jones and Bill Cosby (then a drummer).

During the 1960s, he performed with various organists including Jimmy Smith and Don Patterson, with whom he recorded in 1978. In the 1980s, he toured with Sonny Stitt. He continued to play in his home town and recorded his album You Leave Me Breathless! in 1995.

Barnes was elected as the youngest-ever assistant secretary of Philadelphia's Local 274 of the American Federation of Musicians, serving from 1969 to 1971.

In an article for Patch, Kim Tucker wrote, "Barnes has toured the world performing the music he loves, jazz in places like St. Croix US Virgin Islands, to Europe and back home to Philadelphia. From the "Chitlin Circuit" to the infamous New Jersey clubs: Dreamland, Cotton Club, Loretta's High Hat, Club Harlem. Barnes has taken the stage at Philly's Blue Note, Just Jazz, Red Carpet, The Showboat and Pep's too."

== Personal life ==
Barnes died from COVID-19 at Lankenau Hospital in Wynnewood, Pennsylvania, on April 22, 2020, during the COVID-19 pandemic. He was 82.

Barnes' grandson Reginald Lewis has followed in his footsteps as a jazz saxophonist and educator. As of 2022, Lewis is director of Jazz and assistant professor in the School of Music at Illinois Wesleyan University. He earned his Doctor of Musical Arts in 2023 from the University of Illinois Urbana-Champaign; his thesis was a study of Barnes and his influence on the Philadelphia jazz community.

== Discography ==
=== As a leader ===
- Been Here All Along – Bootsie Barnes Quartet (Way After Midnight, 1984)
- You Leave Me Breathless – Bootsie Barnes Quartet (French Riviera, 2001)
- Hello - Bootsie Barnes Quartet (French Riviera, 2003)
- Boppin' Round the Center – Bootsie Barnes Quintet (Harvest, 2004)
- The More I See You – Bootsie Barnes & Larry McKenna (Cellar Live, 2018)

=== As a sideman ===
- Looking Up - Cullen Knight (Tree Top, 1978)
- Why Not... - Don Patterson (Muse, 1978)
- Here to Create Music - Gamble/Huff (Philadelphia International, 1980)
- The Saxophone Shop - The Odean Pope Saxophone Choir (Soul Note, 1985)
- John Swana Quintet - Introducing John Swana (Criss Cross, 1991)
- Epitome - Odean Pope Saxophone Choir (Soul Note, 1993)
- Comin' Home - Poppa John DeFrancesco (Muse, 1994)
- All in the Family - Poppa John & Joey DeFrancesco (Muse, 1998)
- Live at Ortlieb's Jazzhaus - Various Artists (Encounter, 2000)
- Hip Cake Walk - Poppa John & Joey DeFrancesco (HighNote, 2001)
- Philly Gumbo - John Swana (Criss Cross, 2001)
- Open the Gates - Kenny Gates (Independent, 2003)
- To Joe With Love - Juanita Holliday (Rhombus, 2003)
- Shelf-Life - Uri Caine (Winter & Winter, 2005)
- Philly Gumbo, Vol.2 - John Swana and The Philadelphians (Criss Cross, 2005)
- I Got Up! - Chad Carter (Jkbj, 2009)

== Awards and honors ==
- Urban League Guild of Philadelphia - Marjorie Dockery volunteer award
- Greater Jamaica Development Award, New York
- Camden County Living Legend Award
