= New Horizons (Sounds of Liberation album) =

Studio album by Sounds of Liberation
- Released: 1972
- Recorded: March 1972
- Studios: Impact Sound, Philadelphia
- Genres: Free jazz, funk, spiritual jazz
- Length: 51:29
- Labels: Dogtown Records; FW9683

Sounds of Liberation chronology
New Horizons (1972)	Unreleased (Columbia University 1973) (2018)

New Horizons is the debut album by the Philadelphia-based jazz collective Sounds of Liberation. It was recorded during March 1972 at Impact Sound in Philadelphia, and was released on vinyl later that year by Dogtown Records. In 2010, it was reissued in remastered form on both vinyl and CD by Porter Records with the title Sounds of Liberation, and in 2019, it was reissued on vinyl, with liner notes by writer Francis Davis, by Dogtown. The album features vibraphonist and band leader Khan Jamal, saxophonist Byard Lancaster, guitarist Monnette Sudler, electric bassist Billy Mills, drummer Dwight James, conga player Rashid Salim, and percussionist Omar Hill.

New Horizons was the group's only commercially issued recording prior to their dissolution. However, in 2019, Dogtown issued an album, titled Unreleased, documenting a 1973 live performance at Columbia University.

== Reception ==
Professional ratings
Review scores
Source	Rating
All About Jazz	4.5/5 stars
AllMusic	4/5 stars
The Encyclopedia of Popular Music	3/5 stars

In a review for AllMusic, Thom Jurek described the album as "a treasure of '70s jazz," and wrote: "SOL's reputation as a classic of vanguard spiritual jazz is well-founded. Its six selections reveal a remarkable interplay between rhythmic instruments, and the incredible technical facility of Lancaster in particular. Jamal is a master bandleader; his vibes bridge musical traditions -- African trance music, free jazz, and funk -- as well as electric and acoustic instruments, creating a unified whole from the parts."

Clifford Allen of All About Jazz stated: "Sounds of Liberation is a decidedly loose outfit, but reliant on massive and relentless vamps that at their most open offer the kind of support that gives compulsion to the squall... A multiplicity of rhythms cascade and bounce off one another, shaken, pounded, thrown and snaking their way through the airwaves... The holy grail(s) of record collecting rarely live up to the hype that surrounds their existence, but the Sounds of Liberation go well beyond anything that could have been hoped for. This is an absolutely wonderful slice of border-trouncing improvised music from the Philly jazz heyday.

The Free Jazz Collective's Stef Gijssels commented: "If you want to hear the sound of the seventies, don't miss this one: it is a great mixture of free playing on a solid rhythmic and often funky base... the music is absolutely hypnotic, trance-inducing and mesmerizing... Highly danceable, highly psychedelic, highly recommended."

== Track listing ==
1. "Happy Tuesday" – 19:17
2. "New Horizons" – 5:25
3. "Billie I" – 2:45
4. "We'll Tell You Later" – 10:45
5. "New Horizons" – 8:40
6. "New Life" – 2:45

== Personnel ==
- Byard Lancaster – alto saxophone
- Monnette Sudler – guitar (tracks 4 and 5)
- Khan Jamal – vibraphone (tracks 1 and 2)
- Billy Mills – electric bass
- Dwight James – drums
- Rashid Salim – congas
- Omar Hill – percussion
