= Monnette Sudler =

American jazz guitarist (1952–2022)

- Born: Monnette Goldman; June 5, 1952; Philadelphia, Pennsylvania, U.S.
- Died: August 21, 2022 (aged 70) Germantown, Pennsylvania, U.S.
- Genres: Jazz
- Occupation: Musician
- Instrument: Guitar
- Years active: 1970s–2022
- Label: SteepleChase

Monnette Sudler (June 5, 1952 – August 21, 2022) was an American jazz guitarist.

== Early life and career ==
Sudler was born Monnette Goldman in Philadelphia, Pennsylvania. Her mother, Lea Goldman, married Truman W. Sudler in 1957. She grew up in the Nicetown-Tioga neighborhood of Philadelphia.

Her first exposure to jazz was listening to her great-uncle play piano. When she was fifteen, she took lessons on guitar at the Wharton Center in Philadelphia. She could play drums and piano, and she also composed, arranged, sang, and wrote poetry. Early in her career she worked with vibraphonist Khan Jamal in the Sounds of Liberation. In the 1970s she studied at Berklee School of Music in Boston and in the 1980s at Temple University. Time for a Change (1977) was her first album as band leader.

During her career, she worked with Kenny Barron, Hamiet Bluiett, Arthur Blythe, Dameronia, Sonny Fortune, Dave Holland, Freddie Hubbard, Joseph Jarman, Hugh Masekela, Cecil McBee, David Murray, Sunny Murray, Trudy Pitts, Odean Pope, Don Pullen, Sam Rivers, Shirley Scott, Archie Shepp, Leon Thomas, Steve Turre, Cedar Walton, Grover Washington Jr., and Reggie Workman.

Sudler died from blood cancer on August 21, 2022, at the age of 70.

== Discography ==
=== As leader ===
- Time for a Change (Steeplechase, 1976)
- Brighter Days for You (Steeplechase, 1977)
- Live in Europe (Steeplechase, 1978)
- Other Side of the Gemini (Hardly, 1990)
- Just One Kiss (MSM, 1998)
- Meeting of the Spirits (Philly Jazz, 2005)
- Let the Rhythm Take You (MSM 2008)
- Where Have All the Legends Gone? (Heavenly Sweetness, 2009)

=== As sidewoman ===
With Khan Jamal

- Drum Dance to the Motherland (Dogtown, 1973; Eremite, 2006)

With Sounds of Liberation

- New Horizons (Dogtown, 1972)
- Unreleased (Columbia University 1973) (Dogtown, 2018)
