= Life's Force =

Studio album by Ahmed Abdullah
- Released: 1979
- Studio: Blue Rock Studio, New York City
- Genre: Jazz
- Label: About Time; AT-1001

Ahmed Abdullah chronology
Life's Force (1979)	Live at Ali's Alley (1980)

Life's Force is an album by trumpeter Ahmed Abdullah, listed simply as "Abdullah" on the cover. His debut as a leader, it was recorded at Blue Rock Studio in New York City, and was issued in 1979 by About Time Records as the label's inaugural release. On the album, Abdullah is joined by hornist Vincent Chancey, cellist Muneer Abdul Fatah, vibraphonist Jay Hoggard, bassist Jerome Hunter, and drummer Rashied Sinan.

In 1979, while Abdullah was music director of her dance company, "Life's Force" was choreographed by Dianne McIntyre, and the work was premiered at the Carver Center in San Antonio, Texas. McIntyre described it as "a dance music collaboration" in which "dancers become part of the band." She commented: "Ahmed Abdullah... developed the dance together along with the people in the company. For him 'Life's Force' celebrates the energy that takes people to higher consciousness. It's the inner spirit. There is a rhythmical source that keeps on throughout the whole piece. The pulse is still going even when the piece finishes." Following a performance of the work in New York City, Jennifer Dunning of The New York Times stated that it "stole the show," calling the music "vibrant" and "hard-pushing," and the choreography "full of invention."

== Reception ==
Professional ratings
Review scores
Source	Rating
AllMusic	4.5/5 stars
The Virgin Encyclopedia of Jazz	3/5 stars
The Encyclopedia of Popular Music	3/5 stars

In a review for AllMusic, Scott Yanow called the album a "stimulating release," and praised Abdullah's "appealing tone" and "adventurous style." He wrote: "The unusual blend of colorful instruments is the prime reason to pick up this obscure LP."

A writer for The Jazz Spot stated that the album "blends... a great amount of sophistication and harmony," and noted the "exploratory and adventurous virtues of a composer that gives great importance to the melodic aspects but also to details."

== Track listing ==
"Assunta" composed by Cal Massey. Remaining tracks composed by Ahmed Abdullah.

1. "Eternal Spiraling Spirit" – 9:55
2. "Assunta" – 6:02
3. "Qhude" – 4:58
4. "Song of Tenderness" – 6:10
5. "A Long Time Black" – 10:23
6. "Life's Force" – 8:04

== Personnel ==
- Ahmed Abdullah – trumpet
- Vincent Chancey – French horn
- Muneer Abdul Fatah – cello
- Jay Hoggard – vibraphone
- Jerome Hunter – bass
- Rashied Sinan – drums
