= Jazzonia =

Studio album of cover songs by Bill Laswell
- Released: August 25, 1998
- Recorded: Orange Music (West Orange, N.J.)
- Genre: Jazz, hip hop
- Length: 54:09
- Label: Douglas
- Producer: Alan Douglas, Bill Laswell

Bill Laswell chronology
Oscillations 2 (1997)	Jazzonia (1998)	Nagual Site (1998)

Professional ratings
Review scores
Source	Rating
Allmusic	4/5 stars
Allmusic	3.5/5 stars

Jazzonia is a cover album by American composer Bill Laswell, released on August 25, 1998, by Douglas Music.

== Track listing ==
No.	Title	Writer(s)	Length
1.	"Moody's Mood for Love"	James Moody	6:15
2.	"Little Boy Don't Get Scared"	Stan Getz, Jon Hendricks	7:55
3.	"Swan Blues"	Richard Carpenter	6:13
4.	"I'm Gone"	Quincy Jones, King Pleasure	5:41
5.	"Blue"	Joni Mitchell	6:20
6.	"Cotton Tail"	Duke Ellington	8:36
7.	"Angel Eyes"	Earl Brent, Matt Dennis	5:57
8.	"Twisted"	Wardell Gray, Annie Ross	5:25
9.	"Fade"	Bill Laswell	1:47

== Personnel ==
Adapted from the Jazzonia liner notes.

Musicians

- Asante – vocals (1, 2, 3, 4, 6, 7, 8)
- Karl Berger – vibraphone (1, 2, 3, 7), piano (3, 5), synthesizer and keyboard bass (5, 7), musical arrangements (1, 2, 5, 7)
- Dana Bryant – vocals (1, 4)
- Bootsy Collins – vocals (6)
- Grand Mixer DXT – turntables (5, 6)
- Graham Haynes – cornet (4, 5, 6), flugelhorn (7)
- Byard Lancaster – alto saxophone (1, 4), tenor saxophone (2, 8, 9), flute (8, 9)
- Bill Laswell – bass guitar (1, 2, 3, 4, 6, 8, 9), percussion (1, 2, 3, 4, 8, 9), turntables (1, 2, 8, 9), effects (5), drum programming (5)
- Melle Mel – vocals (4, 8)
- Amina Claudine Myers – Hammond organ and electric piano (4, 6, 8, 9), voice (7)
- Roc Raida – turntables (3, 4)
- Alicia Renee – vocals (1, 3, 8)
- Brandon Ross – guitar (1, 2, 8, 9)
- Nicky Skopelitis – guitar (7)

Technical personnel

- Alan Douglas – producer
- Joe Gastwirt – mastering
- Robert Musso – engineering

== Release history ==
Region	Date	Label	Format	Catalog
United States	1998	Douglas	CD	ADC18
United States	2006	Douglas	CD	AD-12
