= Restoration Ruin =

Studio album by Keith Jarrett
- Released: 1968
- Recorded: March 12, 1968
- Studio: Atlantic, New York City, US
- Genre: Folk rock
- Length: 29:33
- Label: Vortex Records
- Producer: George Avakian

Keith Jarrett chronology
Life Between the Exit Signs (1968)	Restoration Ruin (1968)	Somewhere Before (1969)

Restoration Ruin is an album by Keith Jarrett on which he performs multiple instruments (including piano, organ, guitar, soprano saxophone, harmonica, recorder, bass guitar, drums, tambourine and sistrum), and sings his own lyrics. Recorded and released on the Atlantic Records subsidiary Vortex in 1968, the album remains unique in Jarrett's catalogue, displaying a sound largely influenced by folk and progressive rock. It can be seen as the first part of an experimental period which explored neither traditional jazz nor classical music. Here Jarrett overdubs himself on various instruments, similar to the tribal Spirits (1985) or especially the free funk No End (2013, recorded in 1986). "Sioux City Sue New" was released as a 45 rpm single, backed with "You're Fortunate." In 1999, Collectables Records reissued the album paired with the Art Ensemble of Chicago's Bap-Tizum.

== Reception ==
Professional ratings
Review scores
Source	Rating
AllMusic	2.5/5 stars
The Penguin Guide to Jazz	3/4 stars
Encyclopedia of Popular Music	2/5 stars

In his quite enthusiastic Jarrett's biography Ian Carr states:

As a bit of juvenilia, this is an impressive achievement in terms of instrumental competence, but as art it is disastrous. Although Jarrett has perfect pitch, he could not at this point sing very well at all and the lyrics—written by him—are often ludicrously banal. George Avakian, the producer of this album, says that it was Jarrett's idea, not his, and comments: "I was so embarrassed about it and that's one of the reasons Nesuhi [Ertegun] didn't want to keep Keith—because he hated that album."

The AllMusic review by Richie Unterberger awarded the album 2½ stars, and states, "Restoration Ruin is a real oddity in the Jarrett catalog: a vocal album on which he plays all the instruments. And not a jazz vocal album, either, but a folk-rock one in which he alternates—quite literally, track to track—between sub-Dylan outings and more folk-Baroque ones that echo the late-'60s work of artists like Love and Tim Buckley". The authors of the Penguin Guide to Jazz Recordings commented: "The pieces are all very short, sometimes almost perfunctory, but there is no mistaking Jarrett's gifts and, as an exercise in instrumental eclecticism, it is a much more appealing and convincing performance than the later Spirits."

== Track listing ==
All compositions are by Keith Jarrett.

1. "Restoration Ruin" – 2:20
2. "All Right" – 2:47
3. "For You and Me" – 2:40
4. "Have a Real Time" – 2:51
5. "Sioux City Sue New" – 2:50
6. "You're Fortunate" – 2:21
7. "Fire and Rain" – 2:50
8. "Now He Knows Better" – 2:58
9. "Wonders" – 4:02
10. "Where Are You Going?" – 3:53

== Personnel ==
- Keith Jarrett – vocals, guitar, harmonica, soprano saxophone, recorder, piano, organ, electric bass, drums, tambourine, sistrum
- Unidentified string quartet (tracks 1,3,5,9)
