= Live at Macalester College =

Live album by The J. R. Mitchell Byard Lancaster Experience
- Released: 1972
- Recorded: 1970–73
- Venue: Boston, MA and Macalester College, Saint Paul, MN
- Genre: Jazz
- Length: 61:09 CD release with additional tracks
- Label: Dogtown

Byard Lancaster chronology
It's Not Up to Us (1968)	Live at Macalester College (1972)	Us (1974)

Live at Macalester College is a live album by saxophonist/flautist Byard Lancaster and drummer J. R. Mitchell originally released in 1972 on the Dogtown label and rereleased in 2008 on CD by Porter Records.

== Reception ==
Professional ratings
Review scores
Source	Rating
AllMusic	4/5 stars
All About Jazz	3/5 stars

The AllMusic review by Thom Jurek stated "This is an incredible document of post-Coltrane free jazz". On All About Jazz, Hrayr Attarian noted "Despite the virtuosic musical ideas flowing out of everyone's instrument the recording itself fails to stand as a single multifaceted unit, but instead has the feel of a hodge-podge of different sounds, ideas and styles".

== Track listing ==
All compositions by Byard Lancaster

1. "1324" – 16:29
2. "Last Summer" – 3:25
3. "War World" – 6:35
4. "Live at Macalester" – 10:38
5. "World in Me" – 9:01 Additional track on CD reissue
6. "Thought" – 15:01 Additional track on CD reissue

== Personnel ==
- Byard Lancaster – soprano saxophone, alto saxophone, tenor saxophone, flute, bass clarinet, trumpet
- J. R. Mitchell – percussion
- Sid Simmons – piano (tracks 2–4)
- Lance Gunderson – guitar (track 6)
- Calvin Hill – bass (tracks 1, 5 & 6)
- Jerome Hunter (tracks 2–4), Paul Morrison (track 1) – electric bass
- Lester Lumley – congas, percussion (track 1)
