= Outland 3 =

Studio album by Pete Namlook & Bill Laswell
- Released: April 20, 1998
- Studio: Klanglabor (Frankfurt, Germany)
- Genre: Ambient, electronic
- Length: 54:31
- Label: FAX +49-69/450464
- Producer: Pete Namlook

Bill Laswell chronology
Oscillations Remixes (1997)	Outland 3 (1998)	Oscillations 2 (1998)

Professional ratings
Review scores
Source	Rating
Allmusic	3/5 stars

Outland 3 is a collaborative album by Bill Laswell and Pete Namlook, released on April 20, 1998, by FAX +49-69/450464.

Several tracks appear to contain samples from an episode of the TV Drama The Outer Limits titled Specimen: Unknown.

== Track listing ==
All music is composed by Bill Laswell and Pete Namlook.

No.	Title	Length
1.	"Definition of Life"	14:13
2.	"The Question of Containment"	20:44
3.	"Keeper of the Purple Twilight"	11:47
4.	"DSTC"	7:47

== Personnel ==
Adapted from the Outland 3 liner notes.

- Bill Laswell – electronics, cover art
- Pete Namlook – electronics, producer

== Release history ==
Region	Date	Label	Format	Catalog
Germany	1998	FAX +49-69/450464	CD	PW 37
Germany	2003	Ambient World	CD	aw 027
