= Life Between the Exit Signs =

Studio album by Keith Jarrett
- Released: April 1968
- Recorded: May 4, 1967
- Studio: Atlantic, New York City, US
- Genre: Avant-garde jazz
- Length: 43:18
- Label: Vortex Records
- Producer: George Avakian

Keith Jarrett chronology
Life Between the Exit Signs (1968)	Restoration Ruin (1968)

Keith Jarrett American Group (first trio) chronology
Life Between the Exit Signs (1967)	Somewhere Before (1968)

Life Between the Exit Signs is the first jazz album by pianist Keith Jarrett as a leader. It was recorded on May 4, 1967 at Atlantic Recording Studios, in New York City and released on April 1, 1968, under the record label Vortex, a subsidiary label of Atlantic Records. It is the first session featuring Jarrett, bassist Charlie Haden and drummer Paul Motian together. In 1999, Collectables Records reissued the album paired with Jarrett's El Juicio (The Judgement), and in 2004 Atlantic Records reissued it along with extensive liner notes by Professor Bill Dobbins.

The tracks are quite influenced by the music of Ornette Coleman and Bill Evans, Jarrett having long been an admirer of both, Haden having played with Coleman (1959–60) and Motian having played with Evans (1959–64). "Margot" is an homage to Jarrett's wife.

== Background and making of ==
As stated by Bill Dobbins on the 2004 reissue liner notes:

"The Charles Lloyd Quartet was being managed at the time by George Avakian, an experienced producer and A&R man who had worked for Columbia Records and signed such jazz legends as Louis Armstrong, Duke Ellington, and Miles Davis to their roster. In spite of the group's success, Atlantic Records still had reservations about Jarrett's first featured recording and assigned him to their subsidiary Vortex label. However, Avakian did secure him the luxury of engaging any musicians with whom he wanted to record. After deciding on the piano-trio format, it took a bit of time and thought to make the final choice of teammates.
( .. ) The combination of Charlie Haden and Paul Motian probably seemed incongruous to most musicians before they actually heard the musical results of the session, but it points to one of the important aspects of Jarrett's uncanny creative intuition. He had always been open to the expressive powers of all kinds of music, whereas many players tended to have strong stylistic prejudices, both in terms of listening to and playing music. Unfortunately, most people who really love Bill Evan's music are not so fond of Coleman's stylings, and vice versa. Jarrett had a strong affection for both and realized that aspects of their musical attitudes could not only work compatibly with each other but could also result in an entirely different kind of trio. Only he himself could act as the catalyst. He observed that, at this point in his musical development, he was more interested in exploring than in swinging. Although this trio didn't romp in the more traditional manner of the Lloyd group when it had a full head of steam going, their music certainly managed to swing in its own way. And it had a wide-open, searching quality as a result of the courageous assemblage of a band whose members played quite differently from one another but shared more than enough common ground to enable the music to cohere convincingly."

== Original Liner notes (1968) ==
Excerpts from Jarrett's notes on the original Vortex 1968 issue include:

"I have been asked to say something about the music in this album. I would like very much to do so; however, if there were words to express it, there would be no need for the music. I can speak for Paul, Charlie and myself on an extra-musical level (or a human one). The music is, after all, sincere, so do not question its meaning. What you feel or experience from it is what it is. It is no more and no less than that."

"The exits involved are those which everyone is capable of utilizing. I hope they can be glimpsed through our music."

"I must add a word about the recording session. It was done without any restrictions whatsoever on the music. Mr. Avakian (man of many worlds) supervised the recording but not one alteration in the music was made. I am extremely grateful for this."

== Reception ==
Professional ratings
Review scores
Source	Rating
AllMusic	4.5/5 stars
Encyclopedia of Popular Music	2/5 stars
All About Jazz	4/5 stars

John Kelman at All About Jazz stated that Life Between the Exit Signs is a "straightforward session that (..) ultimately succeeds as a consistent document of where Jarrett came from and who he was ultimately to become (..) a remarkable first outing from a pianist who has inarguably become as important as his sources, moving the tradition forward while at the same time maintaining a clear reverence for it."

In a review for AllMusic, Jim Todd wrote: "Haden rumbles, throbs, and drones, marvelously lost in bass reverie. Motian has begun to transcend traditional ideas about tempo and to extract absolutely remarkable sounds from his kit. With brushes alone, his sonic palette includes frantic, flapping, prehistoric birds caught in drain pipes and 60-pound bags of sand pelting into banks of fresh snow. In a program of originals and one standard, Jarrett feeds off his partners with strategies informed by key influences from Bill Evans to Cecil Taylor."

The authors of the Penguin Guide to Jazz Recordings stated that, in comparison with Jarrett's later "Standards Trio" recordings, "it is immediately apparent how much more straightforwardly rhythmic Jarrett sounds in 1967, but as yet how uncomfortably co-ordinated he is with the group." They continued: "'Lisbon Stomp' is a cracking opener. The two tunes called 'Love No. 1 and No. 2' are extremely individual and 'Life..." itself has the distinctive jazz/pop/country feel one associates with Jarrett. What is as yet unformed is his ability to shape a group as if it were a single instrument compounded of different personalities."

Writing for London Jazz News, Mike Collins commented: "Listening to the first notes of 'Lisbon Stomp'... is startling. The... track seems now like quintessential Jarrett with a hint of a boppish turn in the melodic phrase, an exuberant rocky flourish to resolve the harmony and slivery, fluid runs launching the improvisation. Somehow, the sound from a slightly dead sounding piano is unmistakably his. It's as if he emerged fully formed with a distinct voice at the very beginning of his long career."

== Track listing ==
All songs written by Keith Jarrett, unless otherwise noted.

1. "Lisbon Stomp" - 6:06
2. "Love No. 1" - 6:17
3. "Love No. 2" - 4:32
4. "Everything I Love" (Cole Porter) - 4:33
5. "Margot" - 3:45
6. "Long Time Gone (But Not Withdrawn)" - 4:55
7. "Life Between the Exit Signs" - 6:53
8. "Church Dreams" - 6:17

== Personnel ==
- Keith Jarrett - piano
- Charlie Haden - double-bass
- Paul Motian - drums
