= Guitar (Sonny Sharrock album) =

Studio album by Sonny Sharrock
- Released: 1986
- Studio: RPM Sound (New York)
- Genre: Avant-garde jazz; jazz fusion; heavy metal
- Length: 37:25
- Label: Enemy
- Producer: Bill Laswell; Sonny Sharrock

Sonny Sharrock chronology
Dance with Me Montana (1982)	Guitar (1986)	Seize the Rainbow (1987)

Guitar is a 1986 studio album by American jazz guitarist Sonny Sharrock. He recorded the album with producer Bill Laswell at RPM Sound Studios in New York City. As the project's sole instrumentalist, Sharrock performed and overdubbed his guitar improvisations onto other sections of a song he had recorded beforehand.

Guitar was released by Enemy Records to positive reviews from critics, who praised Sharrock's compositions, playing, and use of distortion. The album was named the eighth best of 1986 by rock critic Robert Christgau, while jazz writer Ian Carr said it epitomized the electric guitar's range as an instrument.

== Composition and recording ==
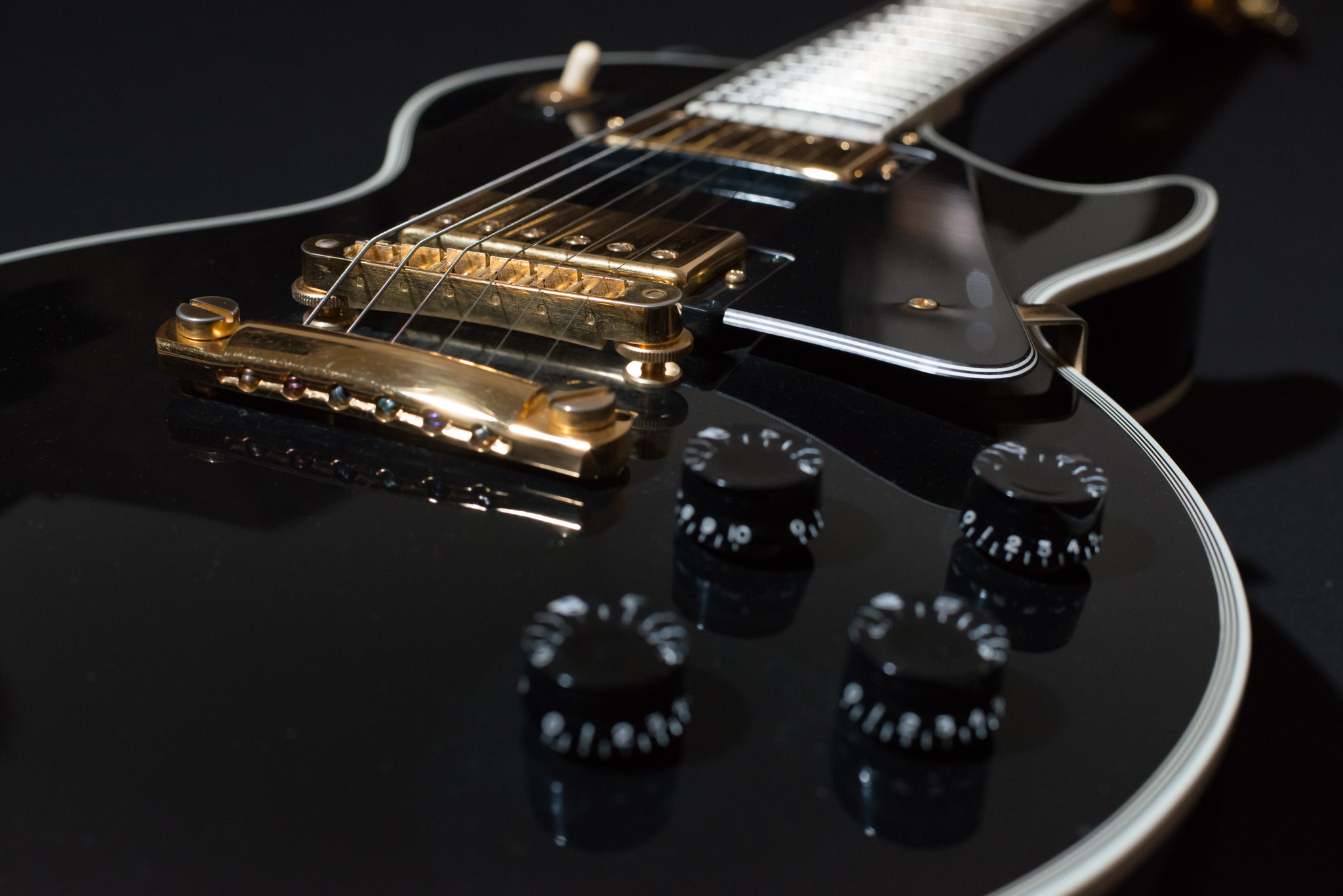
A Gibson Les Paul Custom, as played by Sharrock on the album

Guitar was viewed by Sharrock as the culmination of a period in his career spent developing his sense of composition. After releasing his first record, Black Woman, in 1969, he experimented with different influences during the 1970s. When he recorded "Dance with Me Montana" in 1982, the song's chord progression changed his perspective on composing and inspired him to pursue more melodic ideas. "You listen to [it], and it's like a blind man struggling to get out of a room", Sharrock recalled. "Guitar was a crystallization of all of the things that I had discovered in that song."

In the early 1980s, Sharrock had also worked on projects with Material, an experimental band fronted by Bill Laswell, who had convinced Sharrock to return to music in 1981. With Laswell, Sharrock would also form the band Last Exit during this period and depart from the lyrical jazz guitar he had played with a Gibson L-5 in favor of more heavy metal– and shred–influenced playing using a Gibson Les Paul Custom. According to Reverb.com writer Jay Laughton, Guitar is the first in a series of "metal–inflected jazz albums" by Sharrock.

Sharrock recorded Guitar at RPM Sound Studios in New York City, with Laswell helping produce. As the sole instrumentalist for the project, Sharrock first recorded his performance of a song's introductory passage and chord statement before overdubbing his improvisations onto the finished recording. His compositions on the album included a blues piece called "Black Bottom", the berceuse "Broken Toys", "Devils Doll Baby"—which featured Sharrock's frenzied slide guitar playing—and "Princess Sonata", a suite showcasing a range of techniques. Sharrock cited Guitar as the first time he was able to play both powerfully and melodically in the same way saxophonists John Coltrane and Albert Ayler had late in their careers.

== Release and reception ==
Professional ratings
Review scores
Source	Rating
AllMusic	4.5/5 stars
Hi-Fi News & Record Review	A
MusicHound Jazz	5/5
The Penguin Guide to Jazz	4/4 stars
Spin Alternative Record Guide	10/10
The Village Voice	A

Guitar was released in 1986 by Enemy Records. Reviewing for The Village Voice in September of that year, Robert Christgau found Sharrock's avant-garde jazz playing "funky and beautiful" but also daring sonically. He said his songs feature expressive melodies, relaxed tempos, and definite song structures, which are sometimes "either counterpointed or strung together in a suite". Ken Hyder from Hi-Fi News & Record Review appreciated how Sharrock had abandoned the rhythmic strumming style of his past work in favor of "a post-Hendrix feedback electric guitar sound" in an elaborate overdubbing process that sustained his well–defined guitar lines. Hyder recommended the album to listeners of all genres and said Sharrock's playing recalled blues, R&B, and folk melodies. "Throughout all the distortion he avoids the one-dimensional emotion trap and comes up with something intensely warm and human." At the end of 1986, Christgau named it the year's eighth best record in his list for the Pazz & Jop critics poll, and later wrote that both Guitar and Sharrock's next album—Seize the Rainbow (1987)—could restore any listener's interest in jazz fusion.

In a retrospective review for the Chicago Tribune, Greg Kot believed that as a showcase for a solo guitarist, Guitar was "bloodied and beautiful", while AllMusic's Sean Westergaard called it "a beautiful statement by one of jazz music's most unique voices" in Sharrock, whose unadulterated timbre sounded both "powerful and beautiful". Jazz critic John Fordham said the album was a "sensational, terrifying exercise in abstract sounds, fragmented blues, feedback and slide-guitar splinterings," but also "one of the most effective antidotes to the prim and studiedly dramatic conventional jazz-guitar performances on the circuit" at the time. In the Spin Alternative Record Guide (1995), Guitar was ranked 86th on a list of the "Top 100 Alternative Albums". According to The Absolute Sound, Laswell helped produce Sharrock's playing within a glossy, expansive sound that offered both an intimate jazz feel and an intense rock quality, which in the process helped "shine a light into Sharrock's spiritual depths". In The Rough Guide to Jazz (2004), Ian Carr felt Guitar epitomized the breadth of the electric instrument, "ranging from impressionistic sound poetry to abstract-expressionist blitzkrieg".

== Track listing ==
All music is composed by Sonny Sharrock.

No.	Title	Length
1.	"Blind Willie"	4:41
2.	"Devils Doll Baby"	4:07
3.	"Broken Toys"	6:38
4.	"Black Bottom"	3:55
5.	"Kula-Mae"	5:07
6.	"Princess Sonata": I. "Princess and the Magician"; II. "Like Voices of Sleeping Birds"; III. "Flowers Laugh"; IV. "They Enter the Dream"	13:00

== Personnel ==
Credits are adapted from the album's liner notes.

- Mike Krowiak – recording, mixing
- Bill Laswell – production
- Jeff Lippay – assistant engineering
- Sonny Sharrock – electric guitar, production
