= Faith Moves =

Studio album by Nicky Skopelitis and Sonny Sharrock
- Released: 1991
- Recorded: BC Studio in Brooklyn, New York
- Genre: Jazz fusion
- Length: 39:17
- Label: CMP
- Producer: Bill Laswell, Nicky Skopelitis

Nicky Skopelitis chronology
Next to Nothing (1989)	Faith Moves (1991)	Ekstasis (1993)

Sonny Sharrock chronology
Highlife (1990)	Faith Moves (1991)	Ask the Ages (1991)

Faith Moves is a collaborative album by Nicky Skopelitis and Sonny Sharrock, released in 1991 through CMP Records.

== Reception ==
Professional ratings
Review scores
Source	Rating
AllMusic	4/5 stars
Rolling Stone	4/5 stars

Steve Huey, writing for AllMusic, stated: "These are frequently fascinating explorations that illuminate a neglected facet of Sharrock's singular style." In an article for The Washington Post, Geoffrey Himes commented: "There's plenty of tension in the duets -- especially when Sharrock adds barbed-wire to his tone and counterpoint to his harmonies -- but there is so much openness and melodicism in the arrangements to make this free jazz at its loveliest."

== Track listing ==
All music is composed by Sonny Sharrock and Nicky Skopelitis, except "Venus" by Pharoah Sanders.

No.	Title	Length
1.	"Who Are You"	5:27
2.	"Becoming"	2:34
3.	"Mescalito"	3:28
4.	"Venus"	5:48
5.	"In the Flesh"	3:05
6.	"Sacrifice"	4:43
7.	"First of Equals"	5:11
8.	"The Pyre"	6:06
9.	"Uncle Herbie's Dance"	2:55

== Personnel ==
Musicians

- Sonny Sharrock – electric guitar
- Nicky Skopelitis – electric guitar, acoustic guitar, bağlama, Coral sitar, tar, bass guitar, production

Production and additional personnel

- Paul Berry – engineering
- Martin Bisi – engineering
- Bruce Calder – engineering
- Jason Corsaro – mixing
- Oz Fritz – engineering
- Bill Laswell – production
- Robert Musso – engineering
- Howie Weinberg – mastering
