= Unreleased (Columbia University 1973) =

Live album by Sounds of Liberation
- Released: 2018
- Recorded: 1973
- Venue: Columbia University, New York City
- Genre: Free jazz, funk, spiritual jazz
- Length: 30:58
- Label: Dogtown Records; DGTWN-002

Sounds of Liberation chronology
New Horizons (1972)	Unreleased (Columbia University 1973) (2018)

Unreleased (Columbia University 1973) is a live album by the Philadelphia-based jazz collective Sounds of Liberation. It was recorded during 1973 at Columbia University in New York City, and was initially released in 2018 in very limited quantities by Dogtown Records in conjunction with the Brewerytown Beats record store, after which it was made available with broader distribution the following year by both Dogtown and the Corbett vs. Dempsey label. The recording, which was thought to have been lost, features vibraphonist and band leader Khan Jamal, saxophonist Byard Lancaster, guitarist Monnette Sudler, electric bassist Billy Mills, drummer Dwight James, conga player Rashid Salim, and percussionist Omar Hill.

Unreleased was the group's second album, issued 46 years after the 1972 release of New Horizons. On June 13, 2019, the surviving members of Sounds of Liberation reunited for a concert/release party at Philadelphia's Union Transfer, sharing the bill with the Sun Ra Arkestra.

== Reception ==
Professional ratings
Review scores
Source	Rating
The Vinyl District	A−
Tom Hull – on the Web	B+

In a review for JazzTimes, David Whiteis wrote: "The overall mood here is of youthful idealism and optimism, tempered by a startlingly mature aesthetic vision and well-honed musical acumen." The New York City Jazz Record's Pierre Crépon noted that "the group's approach here is firmly centered on the groove," and is marked by "dense rhythmic layers," and suggested that the album finds the band "at their most compact and provides a much welcome occasion to look back at the group."

Ed Hazell of Point of Departure called the album "a real gem, full of fire and funk, and uncompromising in both its commitment to the groove and to jazz soloing." Writing for NPR, Tom Moon included the album in his list of "Best Reissues and Archival Albums of 2019," describing it as "a high-speed portal back to the early '70s and the moment when jazz musicians went headfirst into groove music with a spiritual dimension and/or 'message'."

In an article for Stereogum, Phil Freeman wrote: "when the band digs into a groove, they can get into a zone somewhere between the Art Ensemble of Chicago and the earliest Earth, Wind & Fire recordings." The Vinyl District's Joseph Neff called the album "an enlightening pleasure for the ears," and stated: "it always registers as natural rather than as a strained attempt at commercial viability stemming from frustration and/or desperation." Bruce Lee Gallanter of the Downtown Music Gallery commented: "Music like this makes me feel good to be alive!"

== Track listing ==
1. "Thoughts" (Monnette Sudler) – 4:01
2. "Keno" (Byard Lancaster) – 3:50
3. "Sweet Evil Mist (Rib Crib)" (Byard Lancaster) – 7:08
4. "Badi" (Khan Jamal) – 5:17
5. "New Horizon (Back Streets of Heaven)" (Khan Jamal) – 10:43

== Personnel ==
- Byard Lancaster – alto saxophone
- Monnette Sudler – guitar
- Khan Jamal – vibraphone
- Billy Mills – electric bass
- Dwight James – drums
- Rashid Salim – congas
- Omar Hill – percussion
