= The Saxophone Shop =

Studio album by The Odean Pope Saxophone Choir
- Released: 1985
- Recorded: September 30 and October 1, 1985
- Genre: Jazz
- Length: 34:46
- Label: Soul Note
- Producer: Giovanni Bonandrini

Odean Pope chronology
Almost Like Me (1982)	The Saxophone Shop (1985)	The Ponderer (1990)

The Saxophone Shop is an album by the American jazz saxophonist Odean Pope, recorded in 1985 and released on the Italian Soul Note label.

== Reception ==
The AllMusic review by Scott Yanow stated: "Odean Pope's "Saxophone Choir" is well-titled. The tenor saxophonist is joined by three altos and three tenors (along with a standard rhythm section) for six of his originals and two other songs that he arranged. The saxophonists primarily function as "background singers," making their voices heard mostly as accompanists for the leader. It's an interesting concept".

Professional ratings
Review scores
Source	Rating
AllMusic	4.5/5 stars
Tom Hull	B+
The Penguin Guide to Jazz Recordings	3.5/4 stars

== Track listing ==
All compositions by Odean Pope except as indicated

1. "The Saxophone Shop" - 3:54
2. "Heavenly" (Eddie Green) - 2:52
3. "Cis" - 6:34
4. "Almost Like Me Part 2" - 2:34
5. "Prince la Sha" - 3:40
6. "Muntu Chant" - 4:32
7. "Doug's Prelude" (Clifford Jordan) - 4:14
8. "Elixir" - 6:26

- Recorded at Platinum Factory, Inc. in Brooklyn, New York on September 30 and October 1, 1985

== Personnel ==
- Odean Pope, Arthur Daniel, Bootsie Barnes, Bob Howell – tenor saxophone
- Julian Pressley, Sam Reed, Robert Landham - alto saxophone
- Joe Sudler - baritone saxophone
- Eddie Green – piano
- Gerald Veasley – bass
- Dave Gibson – drums
