= Oscillations Remixes =

Remix album by Bill Laswell
- Released: October 14, 1997
- Studio: Greenpoint (Brooklyn)
- Genre: Drum and bass
- Length: 52:04
- Label: Sub Rosa

Bill Laswell chronology
Chapter Two (1997)	Oscillations Remixes (1997)	Outland 3 (1998)

Professional ratings
Review scores
Source	Rating
Allmusic	(unrated)

Oscillations Remixes is a remix album by American composer Bill Laswell, released on October 14, 1997, by Sub Rosa. It comprises remixed versions of recordings taken from Laswell's first Oscillations album.

== Track listing ==
All music is composed by Bill Laswell.

No.	Title	Remixer	Length
1.	"Oscillations Remix"	Endemic Void	6:10
2.	"Live Pop Mix"	Vedic Sound	5:56
3.	"Low Membrane Mix"	Scanner	5:10
4.	"Oscillations Remix"	Nico	8:23
5.	"Digital Cut-up"	Atom Heart	5:56
6.	"Oscillations Remix"	Bisk	4:43
7.	"Milky Remix"	DJ Grazzhoppa	4:21
8.	"Very Optimistic Dog Mix"	Ui	7:06
9.	"D Mix"	Soul Static Sound	4:19

== Personnel ==
Adapted from the Oscillations Remixes liner notes.

- Duke Brussels – mastering
- Bill Laswell – bass guitar, drum programming, effects

== Release history ==
Region	Date	Label	Format	Catalog
Belgium	1997	Sub Rosa	CD, LP	SR122
