= Somewhere Before =

Live album by Keith Jarrett
- Released: May 1969
- Recorded: August 30–31, 1968
- Venue: Shelly's Manne-Hole in Hollywood, California (USA)
- Genre: Jazz
- Length: 38:30
- Label: Vortex Records
- Producer: George Avakian

Keith Jarrett chronology
Restoration Ruin (1968)	Somewhere Before (1969)	Gary Burton & Keith Jarrett (1971)

Keith Jarrett American Group (first trio) chronology
Life Between the Exit Signs (1967)	Somewhere Before (1969)	The Mourning of a Star (1971)

Somewhere Before is a live album by pianist Keith Jarrett recorded on August 30 and 31, 1968, at Shelly's Manne-Hole in Hollywood, California with his first trio, composed of Charlie Haden (bass) and Paul Motian (drums).

== Reception ==
Professional ratings
Review scores
Source	Rating
AllMusic	4/5 stars
The Penguin Guide to Jazz	2.5/4 stars
The Rolling Stone Jazz Record Guide	4/5 stars

The AllMusic review by Richard S. Ginell awarded the album 4 stars, stating, "As an example of early, unfocused Jarrett, this is fascinating material.". The authors of the Penguin Guide to Jazz Recordings commented: "Heavily rock-influenced and reminiscent of the methodology of the Charles Lloyd Quartet and the Miles Davis group, of which Jarrett was still a member... it has a freshness of approach that Jarrett quickly lost and was slow to regain." Pianist / composer Ethan Iverson singled out "My Back Pages" for praise, stating: "Dylan recorded it as a waltz, but this backbeat 4/4 rendition emulates the hit version by The Byrds. Jarrett's control of light and shade, both in the melody and the accompaniment, gives his pianism a kind of glamour that can reach out and touch listeners from any background."

== Track listing ==
All compositions by Keith Jarrett except as indicated

1. "My Back Pages" (Bob Dylan) - 5:24
2. "Pretty Ballad" - 3:30
3. "Moving Soon" - 4:24
4. "Somewhere Before" - 6:50
5. "New Rag" - 5:40
6. "A Moment for Tears" - 3:07
7. "Pouts' Over (And the Day's Not Through)" - 4:35
8. "Dedicated to You" (Sammy Cahn, Saul Chaplin, Hy Zaret) - 5:00
9. "Old Rag" - 2:37

== Personnel ==
- Keith Jarrett - piano
- Charlie Haden - double-bass
- Paul Motian - drums
