= Sounds of Liberation =

American jazz ensemble

- Origin: Philadelphia, Pennsylvania, U.S.
- Genres: Jazz
- Years active: 1970s
- Labels: Dogtown, Brewerytown Beats

Sounds of Liberation was an American jazz collective formed in Philadelphia, Pennsylvania, in the early 1970s. They got their start in the progressive neighborhood of Germantown, Philadelphia. The band had close ties to the Black Arts Movement of the time, using their music to help spark social activism, with tremendous impact on the African American and jazz community in Philadelphia.

The band had seven members: Byard Lancaster, Monnette Sudler, Rashid Salim, Omar Hill, Khan Jamal, Bill Mills, and Dwight James. Their studio album, New Horizons, was released in 1972. Although it received critical acclaim, the album was only moderately successful commercially. The band also recorded a live session at Columbia University in 1973 which was only recently recovered. Sounds of Liberation saxophonist and flute player Byard Lancaster died in 2012.

Sounds of Liberation played a sound that mixed jazz, funk, free jazz and spiritual jazz. They owe much of their inspiration to jazz legends such as Pharoah Sanders, and funk artists like Curtis Mayfield. The band once performed alongside Kool & The Gang at the 1974 Miss Black America pageant.

A limited release of their 1973 Live Recording was remastered and made available by Dogtown Records in 2019. The LP features cover art from the original group artist Leroy Butler, who also made cover art for experimental Jazz artist / Afrofuturist Sun Ra. Similar to Sixto Rodriguez, the band's fame and cult following grew long after they played together.

== Discography ==
Title	Year	Label
New Horizons	1972	Dogtown
Unreleased (Columbia University 1973) (Live)	1973	Brewerytown Beats
