= Sonny Sharrock =

American guitarist (1940–1994)

Background information
- Born: Warren Harding Sharrock; August 27, 1940; Ossining, New York, U.S.
- Died: May 25, 1994 (aged 53) Ossining, New York, U.S.
- Genres: Free jazz; avant-garde jazz; punk jazz; experimental rock; no wave
- Occupation: Musician
- Instrument: Guitar
- Years active: 1966–1994

Warren Harding "Sonny" Sharrock (August 27, 1940 – May 25, 1994) was an American jazz guitarist. His first wife was singer Linda Sharrock, with whom he recorded and performed.

One of only a few prominent guitarists who participated in the first wave of free jazz during the 1960s, Sharrock was known for his heavily chorded attack, use of feedback, and distorted saxophone-like lines. His early work also features creative use of slide guitar.

== Biography ==
=== Early life and career ===
Sonny Sharrock was born Warren Harding Sharrock on August 27, 1940, in Ossining, New York. He began his musical career singing doo-wop in his teen years. He collaborated with Pharoah Sanders and Byard Lancaster in the late 1960s, first appearing on Sanders's 1967 album Tauhid. He made several appearances with flautist Herbie Mann and an uncredited appearance on Miles Davis's A Tribute to Jack Johnson.

Sharrock first wanted to play tenor saxophone after hearing John Coltrane on Davis' Kind of Blue at age 19, but his asthma prevented this. However, he considered himself "a horn player with a really fucked up axe."

Three albums under Sharrock's name were released from the late 1960s to the mid-1970s: Black Woman, Monkey-Pockie-Boo, and Paradise (which he later disavowed).

=== Career revival ===
After the release of Paradise, Sharrock semi-retired for much of the 1970s and early 1980s. Undergoing a divorce from his wife and collaborator Linda in 1978, he worked as a chauffeur and a caretaker for mentally challenged children. At bassist and producer Bill Laswell’s urging, Sharrock came out of retirement to appear on Material's 1981 album Memory Serves. Starting in 1986, Sharrock was a member of Last Exit with Laswell, saxophonist Peter Brötzmann, and drummer Ronald Shannon Jackson. During the late 1980s, he performed extensively with the New York-based band Machine Gun and led his own band. Sharrock flourished with Laswell's help, noting in a 1991 interview that "the last five years have been pretty strange for me, because I went twelve years without making a record at all, and then in the last five years, I've made seven records under my own name. That's pretty strange."

Laswell produced most of Sharrock's later recordings, including the entirely solo Guitar, the "metal-influenced" Seize the Rainbow, and Highlife. Sharrock's band at the time featured Abe Speller on percussion, Lance Carter on drums, Charles Baldwin on bass, and David Snider on keyboards. These albums were followed by Ask the Ages in 1991, which featured Pharoah Sanders and drummer Elvin Jones. One writer described Ask the Ages as "hands down, Sharrock's finest hour, and the ideal album to play for those who claim to hate jazz guitar." Sharrock recorded music, including the opening and ending themes, for Cartoon Network's Space Ghost Coast to Coast with drummer Lance Carter; this was one of the last projects he completed in the studio before his death. The Space Ghost Coast to Coast episode "Sharrock" carried a dedication to him at the end, and previously unheard music that he had recorded for the show was featured throughout most of the episode.

=== Death ===
On May 25, 1994, as he was on the verge of signing his first major label contract, Sharrock died of a heart attack in Ossining. He was 53 years old. He is survived by his second wife, Dannette Hill, and their daughter Jasmyn.

== Tributes ==
French guitarist Noël Akchoté's 2004 album Sonny II features tracks written, performed, and inspired by Sharrock.

In August 2010, S. Malcolm Street in Ossining was officially renamed "Sonny Sharrock Way". A sign was erected on Saturday, October 2, 2010. Sharrock was also inducted into Ossining High School's Hall of Fame.

== Discography ==
=== As leader or co-leader ===
- Black Woman (Vortex, 1969)
- Monkey-Pockie-Boo (BYG Actuel, 1970)
- Paradise (Atco, 1975)
- Dance with Me, Montana (Marge, 1982)
- Guitar (Enemy, 1986)
- Seize the Rainbow (Enemy, 1987)
- Live in New York (Enemy, 1989)
- Highlife (Enemy, 1990)
- Faith Moves with Nicky Skopelitis (CMP, 1991)
- Ask the Ages (Axiom, 1991)
- Space Ghost Coast to Coast soundtrack (Cartoon Network, 1996)
- Fragments (Okka Disc, 2003)
- Whatthefuckdoyouwant with Peter Brötzmann (Trost, 2014)

With Last Exit

- Last Exit (Enemy, 1986)
- The Noise of Trouble (Enemy, 1986)
- Cassette Recordings '87 (Enemy, 1987)
- Iron Path (Venture, 1988)
- Köln (ITM, 1990)
- Headfirst into the Flames: Live in Europe (MuWorks, 1993)

=== As sideman ===
With Pheeroan akLaff

- Sonogram (Mu Works, 1989)

With Roy Ayers

- Daddy Bug (Atlantic, 1969)

With Ginger Baker

- No Material (ITM, 1989)

With Brute Force

- Brute Force (Embryo, 1970)

With Don Cherry

- Eternal Rhythm (MPS, 1968)

With Miles Davis

- A Tribute to Jack Johnson (Columbia, 1970)
- The Complete Jack Johnson Sessions (Columbia, 1970 [2003])

With Green Line

- Green Line (Nivico, 1970) with Steve Marcus, Miroslav Vitous and Daniel Humair

With Byard Lancaster

- It's Not Up to Us (Vortex, 1966 [1968])

With F. Robert Lloyd

- Think About Brooklyn (Delabel DE 391 382, 1993)

With Machine Gun

- Machine Gun (Mu, 1988)
- Open Fire (Mu, 1989)

With Herbie Mann

- Windows Opened (Atlantic, 1968)
- The Inspiration I Feel (Atlantic, 1968)
- Memphis Underground (Atlantic, 1969)
- Concerto Grosso in D Blues (Atlantic, 1969)
- Live at the Whisky a Go Go (Atlantic, 1969)
- Stone Flute (Embryo, 1970)
- Memphis Two-Step (Embro, 1970)
- Herbie Mann '71 (Embryo, 1971)
- Hold On, I'm Comin' (Atlantic, 1973)

With Material

- Memory Serves (Celluloid, 1981)

With Niù Abdominaux Dangereux

- Ghosts (Heron Music, 1989)

With Pharoah Sanders

- Tauhid (Impulse!, 1966)
- Izipho Zam (My Gifts) (Strata-East, 1973)

With Wayne Shorter

- Super Nova (Blue Note, 1969)

With The Stalin

- Fish Inn (1986 Mix) (Tokuma Onkou, 1986)

With Marzette Watts

- Marzette Watts and Company (ESP-Disk, 1966)
