= Highlife (Sonny Sharrock album) =

Studio album by Sonny Sharrock Band
- Released: 1990
- Recorded: October 1990
- Studio: Quantum Sound Studio in Jersey City
- Genre: Jazz fusion, pop, rock
- Length: 44:18
- Label: Enemy
- Producer: Sonny Sharrock, Francis Manzella

Sonny Sharrock chronology
Live in New York (1989)	Highlife (1990)	Faith Moves (1991)

Highlife is a studio album by American jazz guitarist Sonny Sharrock. It was recorded at Jersey City's Quantum Sound Studio in October 1990 and released later that same year by Enemy Records.

== Critical reception ==
In a contemporary review for The Village Voice, Robert Christgau gave Highlife an "A" and called it a "gorgeously straightforward guitar record" from someone whose musical principles reflect "a genius son" of Jimmy Smith and Jimi Hendrix. He said Sharrock expresses his themes in a dignified manner, with variation in timbre more so than in harmony, while committing to both cacophony and melody in his exploration of jazz and rock traditions. Christgau named it the sixth best album of the year in his list for the Pazz & Jop critics poll. In The Philadelphia Inquirer, jazz critic Francis Davis hailed Highlife as "instrumental-pop at its most energetic and uncontrived". She felt the "vivacious" record was more "pop" than "jazz" but nonetheless a "persuasive argument for the advantages of maturity" in which Sharrock embraced "simplicity and directness, qualities you'd never have expected from him twenty-five years ago".

In The Penguin Guide to Jazz (1992), Richard Cook and Brian Morton gave Highlife three out of four stars and found it more polished than Sharrock's previous records but with "bass-heavy" jazz fusion exercises that showed potential for more in the future. AllMusic's Steve Huey was less enthusiastic, deeming it "something of a transitional album, catching Sharrock in the midst of figuring out where to take his music next, yet that searching quality makes it a compelling listen for fans".

== Track listing ==
All music is composed by Sonny Sharrock, except "All My Trials" and "Highlife" which are Traditional arranged by Sharrock, "Venus/Upper Egypt" by Pharoah Sanders, "Giant Steps" by John Coltrane, and "Kate", which was written by Sharrock and inspired by "Wuthering Heights" by Kate Bush.

No.	Title	Length
1.	"No More Tears"	5:38
2.	"All My Trials"	8:01
3.	"Chumpy"	5:40
4.	"Highlife"	4:14
5.	"Kate (Variations on a Theme by Kate Bush)"	5:51
6.	"Venus/Upper Egypt"	8:38
7.	"Your Eyes"	5:38
8.	"Giant Steps"	0:38

== Personnel ==
Credits are adapted from the album's liner notes.

- Charles Baldwin – bass guitar
- Lance Carter, Abe Speller – drums
- Francis Manzella – recording, mixing and co-producer
- Michael Knuth – executive producer
- Sonny Sharrock – guitar, production
- Dave Snider – Korg M1, Korg Wavestation
