= Oscillations 2 =

Studio album by Bill Laswell
- Released: June 1, 1998
- Recorded: 1997
- Studio: Orange Music (West Orange, N.J.)
- Genre: Ambient, drum and bass
- Length: 48:23
- Label: Sub Rosa
- Producer: Bill Laswell

Bill Laswell chronology
Outland 3 (1998)	Oscillations 2 (1998)	Jazzonia (1998)

Professional ratings
Review scores
Source	Rating
Allmusic	3/5 stars

Oscillations 2 is the seventh solo album by American composer Bill Laswell, released on June 1, 1998, by Sub Rosa.

== Track listing ==
All music is composed by Bill Laswell.

No.	Title	Length
1.	"Virus"	7:37
2.	"Autopia"	8:25
3.	"El Hombre Invisible" (for William S. Burroughs)	16:10
4.	"Red Night"	16:11

== Personnel ==
Adapted from the Oscillations 2 liner notes.

Musicians

- Bill Laswell – bass guitar, drum programming, effects, producer

Technical personnel

- Abdul Malik Mansur – cover art
- Robert Musso – engineering

== Release history ==
Region	Date	Label	Format	Catalog
Belgium	1998	Sub Rosa	CD, LP	SR133
