= Epitome (album) =

Studio album by Odean Pope Saxophone Choir
- Released: 1994
- Recorded: October 4–14, 1993
- Genre: Jazz
- Length: 59:01
- Label: Soul Note
- Producer: Giovanni Bonandrini

Odean Pope chronology
Out for a Walk (1990)	Epitome (1994)	Ninety Six (1996)

Epitome is an album by the American jazz saxophonist Odean Pope recorded in 1993 and released on the Italian Soul Note label.

== Reception ==
The Allmusic review by Al Campbell awarded the album 4 stars stating "This is a truly unique and moving ensemble, making any of their discs recommended".

Professional ratings
Review scores
Source	Rating
Allmusic	4/5 stars
The Penguin Guide to Jazz Recordings	3/4 stars

== Track listing ==
All compositions by Odean Pope except as indicated

1. "Epitome" - 9:56
2. "In and Out" (Eddie Green) - 3:06
3. "Brisa" (Tyrone Brown) - 6:02
4. "Trilogy" (Brown, Pope) - 8:42
5. "Coltrane Time" (John Coltrane) - 5:34
6. "Lift Every Voice" (James Weldon Johnson, John Rosamond Johnson) - 5:04
7. "Improvo" - 3:12
8. "Gray Hair" - 4:10
9. "Terrestrial" - 7:35
10. "Zanzibar Blue" (Dave Burrell) - 5:40
  - Recorded at Morning Star Studio in Spring House, Pennsylvania on October 4–14, 1993

== Personnel ==
- Odean Pope, Glenn Guidone, Middy Middleton, Bootsie Barnes, Bob Howell – tenor saxophone
- Julian Pressley, Sam Reed, Robert Landham - alto saxophone
- Joe Sudler - baritone saxophone
- Dave Burrell, Eddie Green – piano
- Gerald Veasley – electric bass
- Tyrone Brown – bass
- Craig McIver – drums
