= Ekstasis (Nicky Skopelitis album) =

Studio album by Nicky Skopelitis
- Released: April 20, 1993
- Studio: BC Studio, Greenpoint Studios and Platinum Island Studios in New York
- Genre: Jazz fusion
- Length: 56:34
- Label: Axiom
- Producer: Bill Laswell, Nicky Skopelitis

Nicky Skopelitis chronology
Faith Moves (1991)	Ekstasis (1993)	Wake Up and Dream (1998)

Professional ratings
Review scores
Source	Rating
Allmusic	4/5 stars
Q	3/5 stars

Ekstasis is the second studio album by Nicky Skopelitis, released on 1993 through Axiom.

== Track listing ==
No.	Title	Music	Length
1.	"Tarab"	Bill Laswell, Nicky Skopelitis, Jah Wobble	7:19
2.	"Meet Your Makers"	Nicky Skopelitis	5:57
3.	"Ghost of a Chance"	Nicky Skopelitis	5:06
4.	"Proud Flesh"	Nicky Skopelitis	4:48
5.	"Sanctuary"	Bachir Attar, Bill Laswell, Nicky Skopelitis	5:57
6.	"One Eye Open"	Bill Laswell, Nicky Skopelitis	4:41
7.	"Heresy"	Nicky Skopelitis, Foday Musa Suso, Jah Wobble	5:36
8.	"Jubilee"	Nicky Skopelitis, Foday Musa Suso, Jah Wobble	4:39
9.	"Witness"	Simon Shaheen, Nicky Skopelitis, Jah Wobble	7:34
10.	"Telling Time"	Nicky Skopelitis	4:57

== Personnel ==
Musicians

- Bachir Attar – flute (2), ghaita (5)
- Aïyb Dieng – ghaṭam (3, 6), talking drum (5, 8)
- Guilherme Franco – cuíca (2, 3), electric berimbau (3, 6), whistle (2), cowbell (3), tambourine (4), congas (10)
- Zakir Hussain – tabla (1)
- Bill Laswell – bass guitar (2, 3, 6, 10), production
- Jaki Liebezeit – drums (2, 4, 5, 7–9)
- Ziggy Modeliste – drums (1, 3, 6, 10)
- Amina Claudine Myers – Hammond B-3 (2, 3, 5, 6, 8, 10)
- Simon Shaheen – violin (1, 2, 4, 6, 9), Oud (2)
- Nicky Skopelitis – electric guitar, twelve-string guitar, bağlama (3, 9), Coral sitar (6), Dobro (9), production
- Foday Musa Suso – harp (1, 8, 9), kora (4, 7)
- Jah Wobble – bass guitar (1, 4, 5, 7–9)

Production and additional personnel

- Martin Bisi – engineering
- Bruce Calder – engineering
- Ira Cohen – photography
- Chris Flam – assistant engineering
- Oz Fritz – engineering, mixing
- James Koehnline – cover art
- Imad Mansour – assistant engineering
- Robert Musso – engineering
- Aldo Sampieri – design
- Howie Weinberg – mastering
