= Drum Dance to the Motherland =

Live album by Khan Jamal Creative Art Ensemble
- Released: 1973
- Recorded: October 7, 1972
- Venue: Catacombs Club, Philadelphia
- Genre: Free jazz
- Length: 43:15
- Label: Dogtown Records; Eremite MTE-50 / MTE-69
- Producer: Khan Jamal; Michael Ehlers (reissue)

Khan Jamal chronology
Drum Dance to the Motherland (1973)	Give the Vibes Some (1974)

Eremite reissue cover

Drum Dance to the Motherland (also referred to as Drumdance to the Motherland) is a live album by jazz vibraphonist and marimba player Khan Jamal, his debut as a leader. It was recorded on October 7, 1972, at the Catacombs Club in Philadelphia, and was initially released on LP by Dogtown Records in 1973. It was reissued on CD in remastered form by Eremite Records in 2006, and on LP in 2017. On the album, Jamal is joined by members of his Creative Art Ensemble: guitarist Monnette Sudler, bassist Billy Mills, percussionists Dwight James and Alex Ellison, and electronic musician Mario Falgna.

== Reception ==
Professional ratings
Review scores
Source	Rating
The Penguin Guide to Jazz	3/4 stars
All About Jazz	3.5/5 stars
Pitchfork	7.3/10 stars
The Vinyl District	A

In a review for AllMusic, Anthony Tognazzini wrote: "At once fractured, fluid, and expressionistic, with a strong tribal element... the transcendent intentions of Jamal's musical universe are clear... The lengthy, abstract, fusion-oriented jams should appeal to fans of Bitches Brew and other avant jazz outings of the era."

The authors of The Penguin Guide to Jazz Recordings stated that although the album is "inevitably time-lined by its murky sound," "these are nonetheless adventurous and mostly successful tracks... Jamal is subtle enough to overcome any reservations."

Francis Lo Kee of All About Jazz commented: "Jamal is a sincere, exciting player whose music has elements of melody, harmony and rhythm that communicate over and above any roadblocks that a cynical society (or record label) can put up... this is very much a psychedelic '60s recording, made to be heard as a record, even though it's from a 1972 performance in Philadelphia... there is great improvising from all members of the band."

Writing for JazzTimes, Scott Verrastro remarked: "this recording reveals a completely fresh approach to free improvisation in the jazz idiom, undoubtedly influenced by the innovations of '60s psychedelic rock and dub trickery... Very rarely has an album straddled the line between primal and technological with such grace and sensibility."

In an article for Dusted Magazine, Bill Meyer wrote: "Much of this record's appeal resides in the way that assimilated elements... draw you in only to turn you adrift in a sea of wondrous cosmic confusion."

Fact Magazine's Jon Dale stated: "Jamal's vibraphone and marimba lighten the air of the performances, which makes it all the more startling when the clarinets scream in, with acid tang, on the title track. It's one of those heart-stopping moments that albums like these offer – the in-the-moment inspiration of live performance pushing the players to new intensities."

Daniel Martin-McCormick of Pitchfork described the album as "a marvelously trippy journey through the spacier, smokier corners of jazz psychedelia," and commented: "It's a lovely record: deep, adventurous, and soulful. Taken at face value, Drum Dance is a precious stone, a joy to discover, and a worthy addition to the catalogue. The open, unhurried dynamic and expressive atmosphere remain as rich and communicative as it was when it was recorded, over four decades ago. It doesn't need to be anything more."

In a review for The Vinyl District, Joseph Neff called the album "a core document of its era's underground fringe," and remarked: "Had the Khan Jamal Creative Arts Ensemble managed to get heard by more than a few while extant, they would've been a major deal. This LP is anything but an oddball prologue to Jamal's subsequent career."

Nilan Perera of Exclaim! wrote: "Psychedelia, smooth groove jazz and Afro-futurism, there's lot to like here and a lot to consider how far ahead the community was back then."

A writer for Doom and Gloom from the Tomb stated: "Drum Dance to the Motherland... is some kinda unclassifiable spiritual-avant-jazz-dub brew that boils and bubbles, writhes and resonates. An intense, immersive listen — highly recommended."

== Track listing ==
1. "Cosmic Echos" (Jamal) - 5:05
2. "Drum Dance to the Motherland" (Jamal) - 13:46
3. "Inner Peace" (Sudler) - 15:58
4. "Breath of Life" (Sudler) - 7:56

== Personnel ==
- Khan Jamal – vibraphone, marimba, clarinet
- Monnette Sudler – guitar, percussion
- Billy Mills – bass
- Dwight James – drums, glockenspiel, clarinet
- Alex Ellison – drums, percussion
- Mario Falana – sound effects
