= Seize the Rainbow =

Studio album by Sonny Sharrock Band
- Released: 1987
- Recorded: May 1987
- Studio: Electric Lady, New York City
- Genre: Jazz-rock, jazz fusion
- Length: 44:26
- Label: Enemy
- Producer: Bill Laswell, Sonny Sharrock

Sonny Sharrock chronology
Guitar (1986)	Seize the Rainbow (1987)	Live in New York (1989)

Seize the Rainbow is an album by American jazz guitarist Sonny Sharrock, recorded in 1987 and released on the Enemy label.

== Critical reception ==
Professional ratings
Review scores
Source	Rating
AllMusic	4/5 stars
New Musical Express	7/10

Cadence gave Seize the Rainbow a positive review, finding Sharrock to be in exceptionally melodic form and finally accompanied by sidemen who are just as good on a record that may be his "most accessible effort yet", even though some of Sharrock's more experimental solos also work well with his band. In The Village Voice, Robert Christgau said he continues to develop as a gifted melodist with music that is "as accessible as good jazz-rock gets" despite some moments of "signature chaos". He gave the record an "A" and deemed it "uncommonly beautiful and direct without flirting with the saccharine or the simplistic". In his list for the Pazz & Jop critics poll, Christgau named it the tenth best album of the year.

In a retrospective four-star review, AllMusic editor Steve Huey said, "Even if it isn't quite as evocative as the solo sound paintings of Guitar, Seize the Rainbow does place Sharrock's playing in one of its most accessible settings, and it's perhaps the best starting point for rock fans wondering what the fuss is about".

== Track listing ==
All music is composed by Sonny Sharrock.

No.	Title	Length
1.	"Dick Dogs"	5:14
2.	"My Song"	6:29
3.	"Fourteen"	10:00
4.	"J.D. Schaa"	5:37
5.	"Seize the Rainbow"	4:34
6.	"The Past Adventures of Zydeco Honey Cup"	8:24
7.	"Sheraserhead's Hightop Sneakers"	4:08

== Personnel ==
Adapted from the Seize the Rainbow liner notes.

Musicians

- Pheeroan akLaff – drums
- Melvin Gibbs – bass guitar
- Sonny Sharrock – guitar, production
- Abe Speller – percussion, drums

Production and additional personnel

- Bill Laswell – co-producer, 6-string bass (7)
- Robert Musso – mixing
