= Live at Ali's Alley =

Live album by Ahmed Abdullah
- Released: 1980
- Recorded: April 24, 1978
- Venue: Ali's Alley, New York City
- Genre: Jazz
- Label: Cadence; CJR 1000
- Producer: Bob Rusch, TeaEl Productions

Ahmed Abdullah chronology
| Life's Force (1979) | Live at Ali's Alley (1980) | Liquid Magic (1987) |

Live at Ali's Alley is a live album by trumpeter Ahmed Abdullah, listed simply as "Abdullah" on the cover. It was recorded on April 24, 1978, at New York City's Ali's Alley, and released on vinyl in 1980 by Cadence Jazz Records as the label's inaugural release. On the album, Abdullah is joined by saxophonist Chico Freeman, hornist Vincent Chancey, cellist Muneer Abdul Fatah, bassist Jerome Hunter, and drummer Rashied Sinan.

== Reception ==
Professional ratings
Review scores
| Source | Rating |
|---|---|
| AllMusic | 4.5/5 stars |
| The Virgin Encyclopedia of Jazz | 3/5 stars |
| The Encyclopedia of Popular Music | 3/5 stars |
| MusicHound Jazz: The Essential Album Guide | 4/5 stars |

A reviewer for AllMusic stated that the album is "symbolic of the decade's 'loft' jazz, a free-wheeling date with uneven but often compelling solos, as well as periods of rambling, unproductive, and ragged ensemble work. Freeman's blistering tenor sax is uniformly inspired, while Abdullah's solos are also aggressive and energetic."

The authors of MusicHound Jazz: The Essential Album Guide called the recording "a loft-jazz classic with an unusual instrumentation including French horn and cello plus tenor saxophonist Chico Freeman in an inspired, fiery mood."

== Track listing ==
Side A

1. "Happiness is Forever" (Ahmed Abdullah) – 27:42

Side B

1. "Self Portrait in Three Colors" (Charles Mingus) – 3:46
2. "The Inch Worm Part I" (Frank Loesser) – 10:45
3. "The Inch Worm Part II" (Frank Loesser) – 9:29

== Personnel ==
- Ahmed Abdullah – trumpet
- Chico Freeman – tenor saxophone, flute
- Vincent Chancey – French horn
- Muneer Abdul Fatah – cello
- Jerome Hunter – bass
- Rashied Sinan – drums
