= The Ponderer =

Studio album by The Odean Pope Saxophone Choir
- Released: 1990
- Recorded: March 12, 1990
- Genre: Jazz
- Length: 45:43
- Label: Soul Note
- Producer: Giovanni Bonandrini

Odean Pope chronology
The Saxophone Shop (1985)	The Ponderer (1990)	Out for a Walk (1990)

The Ponderer is an album by the American jazz saxophonist Odean Pope recorded in 1990 and released on the Italian Soul Note label.

== Reception ==
The Allmusic review awarded the album 4½ stars.

Professional ratings
Review scores
Source	Rating
Allmusic	4.5/5 stars
The Penguin Guide to Jazz Recordings	4/4 stars

== Track listing ==
All compositions by Odean Pope except as indicated

1. "Overture" - 6:10
2. "I Wish I Knew" (Mack Gordon, Harry Warren) - 1:56
3. "Out for a Walk Part 1" - 3:34
4. "Out for a Walk Part 2" - 3:43
5. "The Ponderer" - 9:11
6. "Little M's Lady" (Eddie Green) - 5:32
7. "Phrygian Love Theme" - 10:21
8. "One for Bubba" (Green) - 5:16

- Recorded at Platinum Factory, Inc. in Brooklyn, New York on March 12, 1990

== Personnel ==
- Odean Pope, Glenn Guidone, Middy Middleton, John Simon, Bob Howell – tenor saxophone
- Julian Pressley, Sam Reed, Byard Lancaster – alto saxophone
- Joe Sudler – baritone saxophone
- Eddie Green – piano
- Gerald Veasley – electric bass
- Tyrone Brown – bass
- Cornell Rochester – drums
