= Vortex Records =

American jazz subsidiary of Atlantic Records

Vortex Records was a jazz subsidiary of Atlantic Records that released 14 albums between 1968 and 1970, including the debut albums by Keith Jarrett, Chick Corea, and Sonny Sharrock.

== Discography ==
Catalog	Artist	Album
2001	Steve Marcus	Tomorrow Never Knows
2002	Joe Zawinul	The Rise and Fall of the Third Stream
2003	Byard Lancaster	It's Not Up to Us
2004	Chick Corea	Tones for Joan's Bones
2005	Robin Kenyatta	Until
2006	Keith Jarrett	Life Between the Exit Signs
2007	Dave Pike	The Doors of Perception
2008	Keith Jarrett	Restoration Ruin
2009	Steve Marcus	Count's Rock Band
2010	Clifford Jordan	Soul Fountain
2011	Leo Wright	Soul Talk
2012	Keith Jarrett	Somewhere Before
2013	Steve Marcus	The Lord's Prayer
2014	Sonny Sharrock	Black Woman
