= Dorothy Donegan =

American jazz pianist and vocalist (1922–1998)

- Born: April 6, 1922; Chicago, Illinois, U.S.
- Died: May 19, 1998 (aged 76) Los Angeles, California, U.S.
- Genres: Jazz; blues; classical; boogie-woogie
- Occupation: Musician
- Instruments: Piano; vibraphone; vocals
- Years active: 1936–1998
- Labels: MGM; Capitol

Dorothy Donegan (April 6, 1922 – May 19, 1998) was an American classically trained jazz pianist and occasional vocalist, primarily known for performing stride and boogie-woogie, as well as bebop, swing, and classical.

== Biography ==
=== Early life, family and education ===
Donegan was born and raised in Chicago, Illinois, and began studying piano in 1928. She took her first lessons from Alfred N. Simms, a West Indian pianist who also taught Cleo Brown. Donegan graduated from DuSable High School, where she studied with Walter Dyett, a teacher who also worked with Dinah Washington, Johnny Griffin, Gene Ammons, and Von Freeman. She also studied music at the Chicago Musical College and the University of Southern California.

=== Career ===
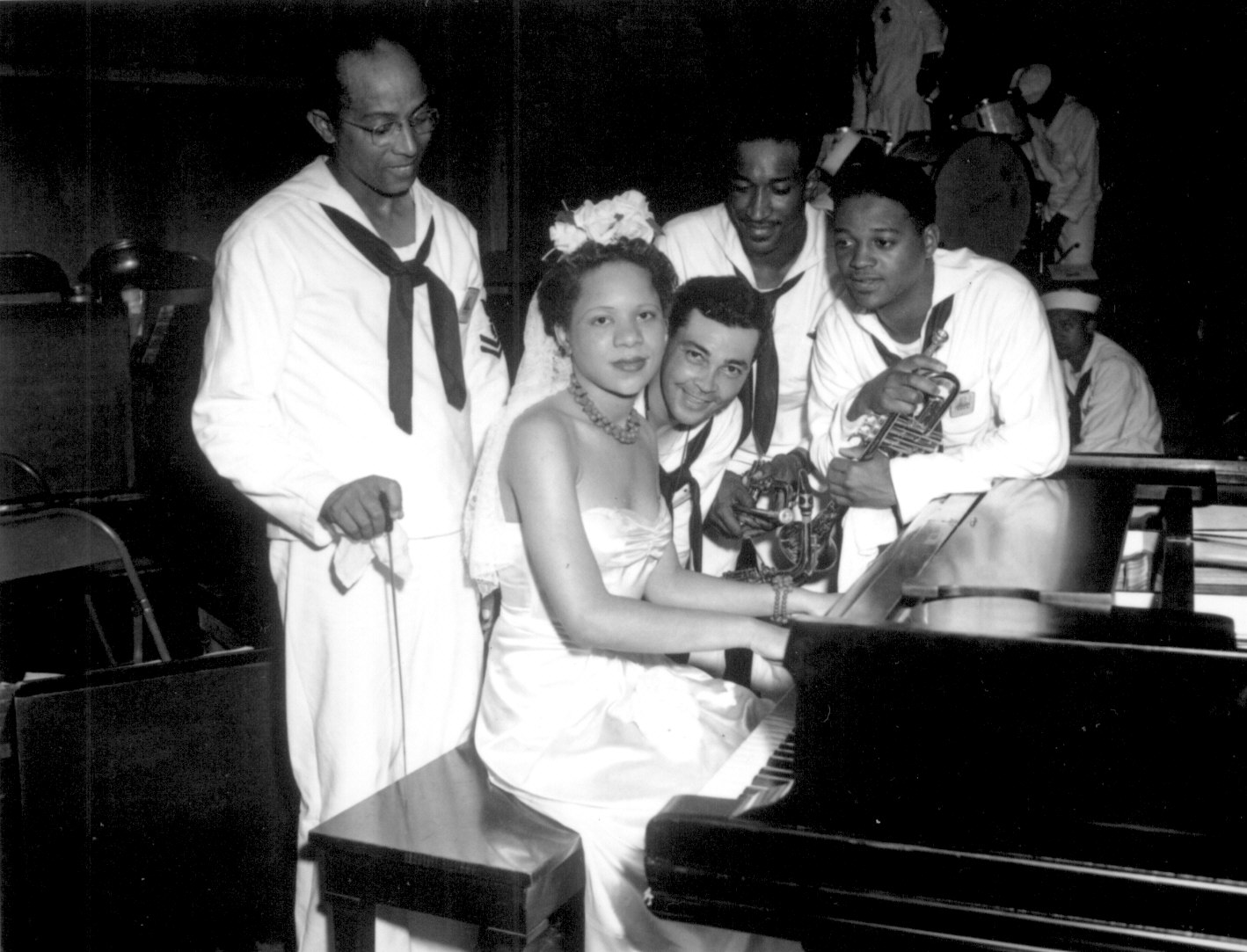
Donegan performing with American sailors at Camp Robert Smalls within Naval Training Station, Great Lakes, 1943

Donegan was known for her work in Chicago nightclubs. In 1942 she made her recording debut. She appeared in Sensations of 1945 with Cab Calloway, Gene Rodgers, and W. C. Fields. She was a protege of Art Tatum, who called her "the only woman who can make me practice". (She said that Tatum "was supposed to be blind...I know he could see women.") In 1943, Donegan became the first African American to perform at Chicago's Orchestra Hall. She later said of this pathbreaking performance:

In the first half I played Rachmaninoff and Grieg and in the second I drug it through the swamp – played jazz. Claudia Cassidy reviewed the concert on the first page of the Chicago Tribune. She said I had a terrific technique and I looked like a Toulouse-Lautrec lithograph.

In May 1983, Donegan, along with Billy Taylor, Milt Hinton, Art Blakey, Maxine Sullivan, Jaki Byard, and Eddie Locke, performed at a memorial service for Earl Hines, held at St. Peter's Evangelical Lutheran Church in New York City. Her first six albums proved to be obscure compared to her successes in performance. It was not until the 1980s that her work gained notice in the jazz world. In particular, a recorded appearance at the 1987 Montreux Jazz Festival and her live albums from 1991 were met with acclaim. Even so, she remained best known for her live performances. She drew crowds with her eclectic mixture of styles and her flamboyant personality. Ben Ratliff argued in The New York Times that "her flamboyance helped her find work in a field that was largely hostile to women. To a certain extent, it was also her downfall; her concerts were often criticized for having an excess of personality." In 1992, Donegan received an "American Jazz Master" fellowship from the National Endowment for the Arts, and in 1994, an honorary doctorate from Roosevelt University.

=== Personal life and death ===
Donegan was outspoken about her view that sexism, along with her insistence on being paid the same rates as male musicians, had limited her career. Donegan died of cancer in 1998, aged 76, in Los Angeles, California.

== Discography ==
=== As leader ===
Year recorded	Title	Label	Notes
1946?	September Song	Jubilee	
1954?	Dorothy Donegan Piano	MGM	
1955?	Dorothy Donegan	Jubilee	
1957?	Dorothy Donegan at the Embers	Roulette	
1959	Dorothy Donegan Live!	Capitol	Album liner notes claim this trio recording was made at "The Embers on Manhattan's elegant East Side."
1959?	Donnybrook with Dorothy	Capitol	
1961	It Happened One Night	Roulette	
1963?	Swingin' Jazz in Hi Fi	Regina	
1975	The Many Faces of Dorothy Donegan	Mahogany	Trio, with Arvell Shaw (bass), Panama Francis (drums); reissued by Storyville with trio tracks from 1961
1975	Dorothy Donegan	Four Leaf Clover (Sweden)	Trio, with Red Mitchell (bass), Lars Beijbom (drums); some tracks add Jan Allan (trumpet) - recorded live at "The Best of Harlem" in Stockholm, Sweden; expanded CD re-issue released in 1994 adds 3 tracks
1978	Live at the King of France Tavern	LiSem	released 2015
1979?	Makin' Whoopie	Black & Blue	
1980?	Sophisticated Lady	Ornament	
1980	Live in Copenhagen 1980	Storyville	Trio, with Mads Vinding (bass), Ed Thigpen (drums); in concert
1980?	Live!	CNR	
1981	The Explosive Dorothy Donegan	Progressive	Trio, with Jerome Hunter (bass), Ray Mosca (drums)
1986	Live at the Widder Bar	Timeless	
1990	Live at the 1990 Floating Jazz Festival	Chiaroscuro	Trio, with Jon Burr (bass), Ray Mosca (drums); in concert
1991	The Incredible Dorothy Donegan Trio	Chiaroscuro	Most tracks trio, with Jon Burr (bass), Ray Mosca (drums); some tracks quartet, with Dizzy Gillespie (trumpet) added; in concert
1992	Dorothy Donegan Trio with Clark Terry	Chiaroscuro	Most tracks trio, with Jon Burr (bass), Ray Mosca (drums); some tracks quartet, with Clark Terry (trumpet) added; in concert
1995?	I Just Want To Sing	Audiophile	

== Filmography ==
- 1944: Sensations of 1945 – musical performer, United Artists
- 1980: North Sea Jazz Classics 1980 – live performance registration by NOS/NPO
- 1995: Jazz at Newport '95 – featured performer, concert for PBS
- 2008: Dorothy Donegan: Pandemonium
