= Ask the Ages =

Studio album by Sonny Sharrock
- Released: 1991
- Genre: Jazz; jazz fusion
- Length: 45:18
- Label: Axiom
- Producer: Bill Laswell, Sonny Sharrock

Sonny Sharrock chronology
Faith Moves (1991)	Ask the Ages (1991)	Space Ghost Coast to Coast (1996)

Ask the Ages is the final album by American jazz guitarist Sonny Sharrock, released in 1991 (though other material recorded earlier would be issued posthumously). It was produced by Bill Laswell and released on his Axiom Records label. It features saxophonist Pharoah Sanders, bassist Charnett Moffett, and drummer Elvin Jones.

== Critical reception ==
Professional ratings
Review scores
Source	Rating
AllMusic	5/5 stars
Chicago Tribune	4/4 stars
MusicHound Rock: The Essential Album Guide	5/5 stars
The Penguin Guide to Jazz	4/4 stars
Pitchfork	9.5/10
Q	3/5 stars
Rolling Stone	4/5 stars
Spin Alternative Record Guide	10/10

In a contemporary review for the Chicago Tribune, Greg Kot said Ask the Ages was a thrilling and essential album for fans of the guitar: "Despite the volcanic power of his playing, Sharrock's majesty is in the lyricism and warmth he finds in even the most abrasive alleyways." Rolling Stone magazine said it sounded like a "classic free-blowing jazz album from the Sixties had been recorded with the clarity and punch of today's rock". In The Village Voice, Robert Christgau gave it an "honorable mention" and described it as "Bill and Elvin's excellent jazz record". He singled out "Little Rock" as the highlight. In The Village Voice's annual Pazz & Jop poll of American music critics, Ask the Ages was voted the 15th best album of 1991.

In a retrospective review, AllMusic's Steve Huey cited Ask the Ages as Sharrock's best work: "the most challenging jazz work he recorded as a leader, and it's the clearest expression of his roots as a jazz player, drawing heavily on [John] Coltrane's modal post-bop and concepts of freedom." In the Spin Alternative Record Guide (1995), the record was ranked 88th on a list of the "Top 100 Alternative Albums".

== Track listing ==
All tracks are written by Sonny Sharrock.

1. "Promises Kept" – 9:43
2. "Who Does She Hope to Be?" – 4:41
3. "Little Rock" – 7:12
4. "As We Used to Sing" – 7:45
5. "Many Mansions" – 9:31
6. "Once Upon a Time" – 6:26

== Personnel ==
- Sonny Sharrock – electric guitar
- Pharoah Sanders – tenor and soprano saxophones
- Elvin Jones – drums
- Charnett Moffett – double bass
- Bill Laswell – producer
