= Monkey-Pockie-Boo =

Studio album by Sonny Sharrock
- Released: 1970
- Recorded: June 22, 1970
- Studio: Studio Saravah, Paris
- Genre: Jazz
- Length: 33:50
- Label: BYG Actuel; 529.337
- Producer: Jean Georgakarakos, Jean-Luc Young

Sonny Sharrock chronology
Black Woman (1969)	Monkey-Pockie-Boo (1970)	Paradise (1975)

Monkey-Pockie-Boo is the second album by American jazz guitarist Sonny Sharrock, recorded in 1970 in Paris and released on the BYG Actuel label.

== Reception ==
Professional ratings
Review scores
Source	Rating
AllMusic	2.5/5 stars

AllMusic awarded the album 2½ stars, stating, "It is an album one wants to like, but it is as difficult to like as the losers at cheerleader tryouts. Not all the problems can be blamed on Big Sonny, but he does decide to lay out on guitar for nearly half of the first side's 17-minute opus... in the end it subtracts from, not adds to, the pleasure of enjoying Sharrock's playing. Of course, there are moments of quality guitar skronking."

== Track listing ==
All compositions by Sonny Sharrock except as indicated

1. "27th Day" – 16:55
2. "Soon" (Linda Sharrock) – 8:00
3. "Monkey-Pockie-Boo" – 8:55

== Personnel ==
- Sonny Sharrock – guitar, slide whistle, vocals
- Beb Guérin – bass
- Jacques Thollot – drums
- Linda Sharrock – vocals
