= Odean Pope =

American jazz saxophonist (born 1938)

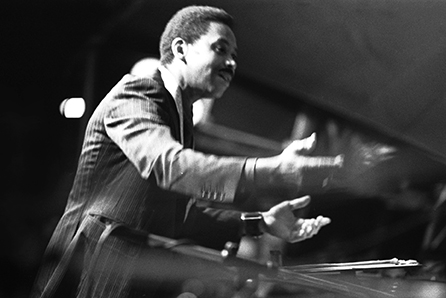
- Pope in 1980

Background information
- Born: October 24, 1938 (age 87); Ninety Six, South Carolina, U.S.
- Genres: Jazz
- Occupation: Musician
- Instrument: Tenor saxophone
- Labels: MoersCIMP; Soul Note; Porter; In+Out
- Formerly of: Catalyst
- Website: www.odeanpope.com

Odean Pope (born October 24, 1938) is an American jazz tenor saxophonist.

== Biography ==
Pope was born in Ninety Six, South Carolina, to musical parents and moved to North Philadelphia at the age of 10, where he was taught by pianist Ray Bryant. His talent at the Granoff School of Music and Benjamin Franklin High School caught the attention of fellow North Philadelphia resident and jazz saxophonist John Coltrane, who offered him his first job in music at age 17. Coltrane had called Pope to inform him that he was leaving to join Miles Davis and asked him to take his place and play with Jimmy Smith. Pope hesitated, expressing his youth and doubt, to which Coltrane responded, "Never say that. Always say you can do something."

Early in his career, at Philadelphia's Uptown Theater, Pope played behind a number of noted rhythm and blues artists including James Brown, Marvin Gaye, and Stevie Wonder.

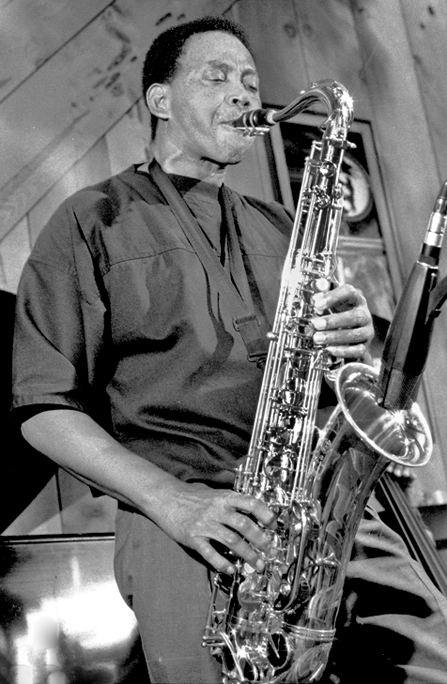
Pope at Bach Dancing & Dynamite Society, Half Moon Bay, California, 1988

He played briefly in the 1960s with Jimmy McGriff, and late in the 1960s, he began working with Max Roach, including on tours of Europe in 1967–68. He was a member of Philadelphia group Catalyst in the early and mid-1970s, and assembled the Saxophone Choir, consisting of nine saxophones and a rhythm section (piano, bass, and drums), in 1977. He became a regular member of Roach's quartet in 1979 and recorded extensively with him, in addition to numerous releases as a leader.

Pope founded the jazz studies program at Settlement Music School and offers master classes within the School District of Philadelphia. He was a 1992 Pew Fellow and, in 2018, was awarded a Pew Center Project grant to create Sounds of the Circle, an evening-length suite reflecting the distinctive sound of North Philadelphia and the mid-20th-century innovators who shaped the city's jazz legacy. He has received awards and fellowships from the Rockefeller Foundation, North Sea Jazz Festival, and the Afro-American Historical and Genealogical Society, and was honored with the Living Legacy Jazz Award from the Mid Atlantic Arts Foundation in 2017.

Pope has publicly spoken about his bipolar disorder, which he has had for over 30 years.

Pope was quoted in 2001 as saying, "Every time I pick that horn up there's always something that I discover I can do differently if I really seek. If you were on planet Earth for, like, 2 billion years, I feel as though there's always something new that you can find to do. There's no end."

== Discography ==
=== As leader ===
- Almost Like Me (Moers, 1982)
- The Saxophone Shop (Soul Note, 1985)
- The Ponderer (Soul Note, 1990)
- Out for a Walk (Moers, 1990)
- Epitome (Soul Note, 1993)
- Ninety Six (Enja, 1996)
- Collective Voices (CIMP, 1996)
- Ebioto (Knitting Factory, 1999)
- Changes & Changes (CIMP, 1999)
- Philadelphia Spirit in New York, (CIMP, 2001)
- Nothing Is Wrong (CIMP, 2004)
- Two Dreams (CIMP, 2004)
- Mystery of Prince Lasha (CIMP, 2005)
- Locked & Loaded: Live at the Blue Note (Half Note, 2006)
- To the Roach (CIMP, 2007)
- What Went Before, Vol. 1 (Porter, 2008)
- Plant Life (Porter, 2008)
- The Misled Children Meet Odean Pope (2008)
- Universal Sounds (Porter, 2011)
- Odean's List (In+Out, 2010)
- Odean's Three (In+Out, 2012)
- In This Moment (CIMP, 2016)

=== As sideman ===
With Max Roach

- Pictures in a Frame (Soul Note, 1979)
- In the Light (Soul Note, 1982)
- It's Christmas Again (Soul Note, 1984)
- Scott Free (1984)
- Easy Winners (Soul Note, 1985)
- Bright Moments (Soul Note, 1986)
- To the Max! (Enja, 1992)
- Live in Berlin (2010)

With Catalyst

- 1972 Perception
- 1974 Unity
- 1999 The Funkiest Band You Never Heard
- 2010 The Complete Recordings, Vol. 1
- 2010 The Complete Recordings, Vol. 2

With others

- 1965: Metaphysics: The Lost Atlantic Album, Hasaan Ibn Ali
- 1972: Catalyst, Eddie Green
- 1986: Music World, Jamaaladeen Tacuma
- 1992: Seeking Spirit, Bobby Zankel
- 1996: 13 Steps on Glass, Sunny Murray
- 2001: Philadelphia Spirit in New York, Byard Lancaster
- 2002: Stepping Around the Giant, Carl Grubbs
- 2006: A Horse of a Different Rhythm, Craig McIver
- 2008: Let the Rhythm Take You, Monnette Sudler
- 2009: Blueprints of Jazz, Vol. 3, Donald Bailey
- 2009: Brownswood Bubblers Four, Gilles Peterson
- 2009: Impressions of Coltrane, Khan Jamal
- 2012: Matt Covington, Matt Covington
