= No End (album) =

Studio album by Keith Jarrett
- Released: November 15, 2013
- Recorded: 1986
- Studio: Cavelight Studio; Oxford Township, New Jersey
- Genre: Jazz, jazz-rock, jazz-funk, avant-garde
- Length: 1:32:53
- Label: ECM 2361/62
- Producer: Keith Jarrett (1986), Manfred Eicher (ex.) (2013)

Keith Jarrett chronology
Sleeper (2012)	No End (2013)	Last Dance (2014)

Professional ratings
Aggregate scores
Source	Rating
Metacritic	49/100
Review scores
Source	Rating
AllMusic	3/5 stars
All About Jazz	4/5 stars

No End is solo album by American pianist and composer Keith Jarrett, credited to "Solo/Band," recorded in 1986 at his home studio in New Jersey and released on ECM in November 2013.

== Background and recording ==
Jarrett performs all the parts through overdubbing between "two Tandberg cassette recorders". Due to its way of recording and musical style it can be seen as part of his “experimental circle” (which is neither jazz nor classical music), along with the early folk rock Restoration Ruin (1968) or the tribal Spirits (1986).

As usual with his solo albums, Jarrett improvised all tracks, but unusually, he mainly used electric guitars (including a "deep red Gibson solid-body"), Fender bass guitar, tablas, drums and assorted percussion; he also includes some voice (wordless chanting on tracks "V" and "XVI"), and his primary instrument, piano (although on track "X" only).

Commenting on the quarter-century delay in release, Jarrett concluding his liner notes on, "How could I have left it in a drawer all these years?"

== Reception ==
In a review for AllMusic, Thom Jurek wrote: "No End proves that Jarrett loved rock & roll, blues, and funk as much as anything else at one time, and was a true son of the '60s and all they entailed... This loose, groove-centric music is (mostly) interesting on two levels: one, because it's Jarrett playing it, but also because it contains its own charm. When these experiments don't work, it's more a lack of virtuoso guitar chops than ideas... He's good at the instrument, just not great. These 20 numbered pieces range in length from just under three minutes to over seven. These ideas develop according to the many faces of rhythm itself, not harmonic forethought. All the instruments are played with deep inner attention paid to them... those who've closely observed his processes and evolution will likely embrace it, as will fans of experimental guitar-based rock... it makes for a welcome addition to the catalog of one of the most mercurial musicians to emerge from the last century."

Writing for All About Jazz, John Kelman commented: "there's something intrinsically charming about being a fly on the wall of Jarrett's home studio, where he plays music for nobody but himself, and explores avenues that are about as far away as can be imagined from the music that's garnered him his reputation as one of the most significant jazz pianists of the past half century... No End may well not be Jarrett at his best... but it is proof positive that assumptions—even those with solid empirical support—are rarely complete truths. Jarrett may have spent the better part of his long career honing the possibilities of a single instrument within a largely singular genre, but his interests clearly reach farther afield. Hard though it may be to believe, nestled within Jarrett the jazz interpreter and spontaneous composer is Jarrett the rock-edged instigator, polyrhythmic explorer and folkloric investigator... No End is a decidedly and surprisingly lo-fi recording from the normally pristine ECM. But for the window that these 92 minutes open into what were, at the time, some of Jarrett's private inspirations, No End may not be a great record, but it is an important one."

Tyran Grillo, in an article for Between Sound and Space, stated: "What's most delightful to hear in this recording is the foundational emphasis on rhythm. Jarrett has always had a flair for syncopation, and here we can experience that impetus in all its naked precision, conveyed by means less mitigated that we're used to hearing... Girded by a refreshing sense of freedom, an inexhaustible creativity that simply must manifest at the intersection of body and instruments, it spins the wheel consistently and spontaneously... The beauty of No End is its possibility. It could soundtrack a spy film, for at times its motives seem playfully clandestine. It could just easily stand alone, as here: a valuable experience for the Jarrett enthusiast. The free-flowing jam aesthetic and nostalgic patina of the home recording are in full effect. Tape hiss and distorted max-outs emphasize the fact that this music has come to us out of time and context, wearing the clothing in which it was buried and which it wears under the spotlight of this new millennium... As Jarrett avers in his liner notes, 'Music is the strongest medicine I know,' thereby dismantling any critical ammunition for what ultimately amounts to an honest slice of sonic pie from one of the greatest musical minds of our time."

== Track listing ==
All tracks are written by Keith Jarrett.

Disc one
No.	Title	Length
1.	"I"	7:22
2.	"II"	3:37
3.	"III"	5:39
4.	"IV"	5:25
5.	"V"	3:39
6.	"VI"	5:36
7.	"VII"	4:06
8.	"VIII"	3:57
9.	"IX"	4:47
10.	"X"	2:33
Total length:		46:47

Disc two
No.	Title	Length
1.	"XI"	4:05
2.	"XII"	6:14
3.	"XIII"	3:48
4.	"XIV"	4:55
5.	"XV"	4:28
6.	"XVI"	2:46
7.	"XVII"	3:40
8.	"XVIII"	5:48
9.	"XIX"	7:12
10.	"XX"	3:04
Total length:		46:06
