= Khan Jamal =

American jazz vibraphone and marimba player (1946–2022)

- Born: Warren Robert Cheeseboro; July 23, 1946; Jacksonville, Florida, U.S.
- Died: January 10, 2022 (aged 75) Philadelphia, Pennsylvania, U.S.
- Genres: Jazz
- Instruments: vibraphone, marimba, percussion
- Years active: 1960s–2022
- Label: SteepleChase

Khan Jamal (July 23, 1946 – January 10, 2022), born Warren Robert Cheeseboro, was an American jazz vibraphone and marimba player. He founded the band Sounds of Liberation in 1970. He was described by Ron Wynn as "a proficient soloist when playing free material, jazz-rock and fusion, hard bop, or bluesy fare."

== Early life ==
Warren Robert Cheeseboro was born in Jacksonville, Florida, on July 23, 1946. His father, Henry McCloud, worked as an entrepreneur; his mother, Willa Mae Cheeseboro, was a stride pianist. He was raised in Philadelphia, and began playing the vibraphone during the later part of his teenage years in the mid-1960s. Jamal attended the Granoff School of Music and the Combs College of Music.

== Career ==
Jamal first played for a group called Cosmic Forces during the later part of the 1960s. He also played with The Sun Ra Arkestra. After leaving the group, he teamed up with several other of its former members to play with Sunny Murray's group Untouchable Factor.

Jamal later co-founded Sounds of Liberation with Byard Lancaster in 1970. Its members included Monnette Sudler (guitar), Billy Mills (bass), Dwight James (drums), and Omar Hill and Rashid Salim (percussion). The band released its only album, titled New Horizons, two years later on its own record label Dogtown. However, it gained little impact outside Philadelphia at the time. The album was eventually reissued on Porter Records in 2010. This gave the group a new lease on life, culminating in the re-emergence of a recording made at Columbia University in 1973. It was ultimately issued in 2019 as Unreleased on Dogtown/Brewerytown.

In addition to leading his own groups, Jamal performed with Ronald Shannon Jackson's Decoding Society in the 1980s, Joe Bonner, Billy Bang, Charles Tyler and others. His first solo album was Drum Dance to the Motherland, a live recording that was held in a small café in his hometown and first released in 1973. It was reissued by Eremite Records in 2006, with the label describing it as "the most legendary private press underground jazz album of the 1970s". Another solo album by Jamal, Infinity (1984), was reissued by Jazz Room in 2021 and dubbed spiritual jazz by WBGO.

Jamal's style connected the two contrasting forms of free jazz and jazz fusion. He was also known for his skill of shifting modes and moods, as well as his versatile way towards music. He was a frequent performer at the Vision Festival.

== Personal life ==
Jamal had two sons: Khan II and Tahir. He died on January 10, 2022, at the Chestnut Hill Hospital in Philadelphia. He was 75, and suffered kidney failure prior to his death.

== Discography ==
=== As leader ===
Name	Year	Label
Drum Dance to the Motherland	1972	Dogtown
Give the Vibes Some	1974	Palm 10
The River	1978	Philly Jazz 1002, with Bill Lewis
Infinity	1984	Con'brio 001; Stash 278; Jambrio 1001; Jazz Room 006
Dark Warrior	1984	SteepleChase
Three	1985	SteepleChase with Pierre Dørge, Johnny Dyani
The Traveller	1985	SteepleChase
Thinking of You	1986	Storyville 4138
Speak Easy	1988	Gazell 4001
Don't Take No!	1989	Stash ST-CD-20
Percussion & Strings	1997	CIMP
Cubano Chant	2000	Jambrio 1002
Balafon Dance	2002	CIMP
Cool	2002	Jambrio 1008
Nothing Is Wrong	2003	CIMP with Odean Pope
Black Awareness	2005	CIMP
Return from Exile	2005	Discograph 6124582
Fire and Water	2007	CIMP with Dylan Taylor-bass
Impressions of Coltrane	2009	SteepleChase

=== As sideman ===
Artist	Name	Year	Label
Sounds of Liberation	New Horizons	1972	Dogtown
Ted Daniel	Tapestry	1974	Sun
Monnette Sudler	Brighter Days for You	1978	Steeplechase
Ronald Shannon Jackson & the Decoding Society	Nasty	1981	Moers
Dwight James	Inner Heat	1983	Cadence
Jemeel Moondoc	Konstanze's Delight	1983	Soul Note
Billy Bang	Outline No. 12	1983	Celluloid
Joe Bonner	Suite for Chocolate	1985	SteepleChase
Omar Hill and Art Webb	Caribbean Breeze	1986	Gaslight
Dan Fogel	Naked Flowers	1986	Laughing Waters
Sunny Murray	Change of the Century Orchestra	1999	JAS
Omar Hill	Tribes of the Future	2000	Afrotex
Jemeel Moondoc	Revolt of the Negro Lawn Jockeys	2001	Eremite
Roy Campbell Jr.	It's Krunch Time	2001	Thirsty Ear
Antipop Consortium and Matthew Shipp	Antipop vs. Matthew Shipp	2003	Thirsty Ear
Matthew Shipp	Equilibrium	2003	Thirsty Ear
Thunderbird Service	Soul Unity	2006	Heavenly Sweetness
DJ Spooky	The Secret Song	2009	Thirsty Ear
Scanner with the Post Modern Jazz Quartet	Blink of an Eye	2010	Thirsty Ear
Sounds of Liberation	Unreleased (Columbia University 1973)	2018	Dogtown
