= Black Woman (album) =

Studio album by Sonny Sharrock
- Released: December 1969
- Recorded: May 1969
- Studios: Apostolic Recording Studios and A&R Recording Studio, New York City
- Genres: Free jazz; spiritual jazz
- Length: 31:20
- Labels: Vortex; 2014
- Producer: Herbie Mann

Sonny Sharrock chronology
Black Woman (1969)	Monkey-Pockie-Boo (1970)

Black Woman is the debut album by American jazz guitarist Sonny Sharrock, recorded in 1969 and released on the Vortex label. In 2000, it was reissued by the Collectables label, paired with the Wayne Henderson album People Get Ready.

The album was produced by flutist Herbie Mann, with whom Sharrock recorded nine albums. When asked about his fondness for Sharrock's playing, Mann commented: "Lots of people say they can't understand how Sonny Sharrock can be in my band. The only reason for them saying that is: possibly they think that when you're a bandleader you expect all your children to be brought up in your exact image. Which just shows that people and critics don't know anything about individuals."

== Reception ==
Professional ratings
Review scores
Source	Rating
AllMusic	3.5/5 stars

In a review for AllMusic, Wilson McCloy stated: "Black Woman marks an early opportunity for Sharrock's own voice to be heard... This album is not for everyone, even Sonny Sharrock fans may find the music beyond their wildest expectations."

In The Quietus, Stewart Smith called the album "a stone cold classic" and "an extraordinary piece of energy music that goes way beyond jazz," and praised Linda Sharrock's singing: "She sounds not unlike Albert Ayler, speaking in tongues and summoning the Holy Ghost".

In naming it the 290th best 'heavy metal' album up to 1991, Chuck Eddy wrote of Black Woman: "It's ghostly blues, with wife Linda caterwauling mysicatal moans rooted in religion (and X-rated movies) as much as the chitlin circuit, and in the monastic Middle Ages and even Islam as much as in any strain of Aframerican Protestantism, though she touches every base I've listed."

In Trouser Press, Matthew Sumera called the album "a vital item in Sharrock’s catalogue," and wrote: "Sonny and crew whip up a hell of a maelstrom. Sharrock's most obviously avant-garde statement, the album also contains a kind of theme song in 'Blind Willy,' here played solo... What is striking about this version... ostensibly a tribute to Blind Willie Johnson but perhaps also to Blind Willie McTell, is Sharrock's audible breathing throughout the piece, pacing his phrases as a reed player would. The effect is intimate (and mildly unsettling) but entirely part of Sharrock's conception and approach to his instrument."

In 2020, Marcus J. Moore of The New York Times included the album's title track on his 2020 list of "15 Essential Black Liberation Jazz Tracks," writing that it "was meant to convey the paralyzing stress felt by black women every day in this country. For much of the song, Sharrock's wife... emits primal screams, as the intensity of Sonny's rapid guitar chords grows more riotous. The track might be jarring, but it effectively captures the pain of being treated as subhuman."

== Track listing ==
All compositions by Sonny Sharrock, except as indicated.

1. "Black Woman" - 5:16
2. "Peanut" - 9:16
3. "Bialero" (Traditional) - 4:52
4. "Blind Willy" - 3:22
5. "Portrait of Linda in Three Colors, All Black" - 8:34

== Personnel ==
- Sonny Sharrock - electric guitar, acoustic guitar
- Dave Burrell - piano
- Norris Jones - double bass
- Milford Graves - drums
- Linda Sharrock - vocals
- Ted Daniel - trumpet (tracks 3–5)
- Richard Pierce - bass (tracks 3–5)
- Gary Sharrock - bells (track 1)
