= Byard Lancaster =

American jazz musician (1942–2012)

- Born: William Byard Lancaster; August 6, 1942; Philadelphia, Pennsylvania, U.S.
- Died: August 23, 2012 (aged 70) Wyndmoor, Pennsylvania
- Genres: Jazz, avant-garde, free jazz
- Occupation: Musician
- Instruments: Alto saxophone, flute
- Years active: 1960s—2012
- Labels: Vortex, Palm, Philly Jazz, CIMP
- Formerly of: Sun Ra, McCoy Tyner

Byard Lancaster (August 6, 1942 – August 23, 2012) was an American avant-garde jazz saxophonist and flutist.

== Early life and education ==
He attended two colleges, one for music, before attending the Berklee College of Music. He moved to New York City and participated in jam sessions which included saxophonist Archie Shepp and drummer Elvin Jones.

== Career ==
In 1965, he recorded Sunny Murray Quintet with the album's eponymous musician in New York, performed in the Parisian Actuel festival with him in 1969, and continued to work in the drummer's groups throughout his career. By the 1970s, Lancaster had played with musicians such as McCoy Tyner, Khan Jamal, and Sun Ra, as well as some outside of jazz, such as blues pianist Memphis Slim and blues guitarist Johnny Copeland.

Near the end of his life he performed regularly with cellist David Eyges and recorded as a leader and sideman for the record label Creative Improvised Music Projects. He died of pancreatic cancer on August 23, 2012.

== Discography ==
=== As leader / co-leader ===
- 1968: It's Not Up to Us (Vortex)
- 1972: Live at Macalester College (Dogtown) as the J. R. Mitchell/Byard Lancaster Experience
- 1974: Us (Palm) with Steve McCall, Sylvain Marc
- 1974: Mother Africa (Palm) with Clint Jackson III
- 1974: Exactement (Palm) with Keno Speller
- 1977: Exodus (Philly Jazz)
- 1977: Wildflowers: The New York Loft Jazz Sessions (Vol 2) (Casablanca/Douglas, Knit Classics) as Flight To Sanity
- 1979: Funny Funky Rib Crib (Vendémiaire/Palm)
- 1979: Documentation: The End of a Decade (Bellows)
- 1979: Personal Testimony (Then and Now) (Concert Artists)
- 1988: Lightnin' Strikes! (Black And Blue) with David Eyges
- 1992: My Pure Joy (Black Fire)
- 1993: Worlds (Gazell)
- 2000: Byard Lancaster Trio (Soultrane)
- 2001: Philadelphia Spirit in New York (CIMP) with Odean Pope, Ed Crockett, J.R. Mitchell
- 2003: The Out Cry (Lancaster) as Crockett, Mitchell & Lancaster
- 2005: "A" Heavenly Sweetness (Isma'a, Discograph)
- 2005: Pam Africa (Spirit Room)
- 2006: Soul Unity (Heavenly Sweetness) as Thunderbird Service
- 2006: Ancestral Link Hotel (Spirit Room)

=== As sideman ===
With Arcana

- Arc of the Testimony (Axiom, 1997)

With Big Youth

- A Luta Continua (Heartbeat, 1988)

With Change of the Century Orchestra

- Change of the Century Orchestra (JAS, 1999)

With Cool Waters

- Cool Waters (NCM, 1993)

With Johnny Copeland

- Copeland Special (Rounder, 1981)
- Jungle Swing (Verve, 1995)
- Texas Party (DeAgostini, 1996)
- Honky Tonkin' (Bullseye, 1999)

With Bill Dixon

- Intents and Purposes (RCA Victor, 1967)

With David Eyges

- The Arrow (Music Unlimited, 1981)
- Crossroads (Music Unlimited, 1982)

With fONKSQUISh

- Useless Education (Promo Preview, 2008)

With Doug Hammond

- Folks (Idibib, 1980)

With Kip Hanrahan

- Coup de tête (American Clavé, 1981)

With Ronald Shannon Jackson

- Eye on You (About Time Records, 1980)
- Nasty (Moers Music, 1981)

With Khan Jamal

- Infinity (Stash 278, 1984)
- Cubano Chant (Jambrio, 2000)
- Black Awareness (CIMP, 2005)
- Impressions of Coltrane (SteepleChase, 2009)

With Dwight James

- Inner Heat (Cadence, 1983)

With Bill Laswell

- Jazzonia (Douglas, 1998)
- Moody's Mood for Love (Douglas, 1998)
- Sacred System - Nagual Site (Wicklow/BMG, 1998)
- Operazone - The Redesign (Knitting Factory, 2000)
- Method of Defiance - Inamorata (Ohm Resistance, 2007)

With Garrett List

- American Images (Horo, 1978)
- Fire & Ice (Lovely Music, 1982)
- The New York Takes (Carbon 7, 1998)

With Geoff Leigh and Frank Wuyts

- From Here to Drums (No Man's Land, 1988)

With Byron Morris and Gerald Wise

- Unity (EPI, 1972; Eremite, 2017)

With Sunny Murray

- Sunny Murray (ESP Disk, 1966)
- An Even Break (Never Give a Sucker) (BYG, 1970)
- Charred Earth (Kharma, 1977)
- Wildflowers: The New York Loft Jazz Sessions (Vols 1 and 5) (Casablanca/Douglas, 1977; Knit Classics, 1999)

With Robert Musso

- Innermedium (1999, DIW Records)

With Errol Parker

- Graffiti (Sahara, 1980)

With Odean Pope

- The Ponderer (Soul Note, 1990)

With Vito Ricci

- Postones (Creation Production Company, 1983)

With Sounds of Liberation

- New Horizons (Dogtown, 1972)
- Unreleased (Columbia University 1973) (Dogtown, 2018)

With Pierre Van Dormael, David Linx and James Baldwin

- A Lover's Question (Label Bleu, 1999)

With Marzette Watts

- Marzette Watts and Company (ESP-Disk, 1966)

With Larry Young

- Heaven on Earth (Blue Note, 1968)
