= Ambient Compendium =

Compilation album by Bill Laswell
- Released: August 27, 1996
- Recorded: 1993–1996
- Studio: Greenpoint, Brooklyn
- Genre: Ambient
- Length: 131:56
- Label: M.I.L. Multimedia
- Producer: Bill Laswell

Bill Laswell chronology
Chapter One: Book of Entrance (1996)	Ambient Compendium (1996)	Oscillations (1996)

Professional ratings
Review scores
Source	Rating
Allmusic	4.5/5 stars

Ambient Compendium is a compilation album by American composer Bill Laswell, released on August 27, 1996, by M.I.L. Multimedia.

== Track listing ==
Disc one (Dark Massive)
No.	Title	Writer(s)	Artist (date)	Length
1.	"Descent" (from Akasha)	Laswell	Divination (1995)	6:04
2.	"Maps of Impossible Worlds" (from Dreamatorium)	Buckethead, Laswell	Death Cube K (1994)	5:50
3.	"Angel Tech" (from Psychonavigation)	Laswell, Namlook	Bill Laswell & Pete Namlook (1994)	7:00
4.	"Aion" (from Visitation)	Laswell, Sharp	Jonah Sharp/Bill Laswell (1994)	6:46
5.	"Monochrome Existence (Part 6)" (from Cymatic Scan)	Inoue, Laswell	Bill Laswell/Tetsu Inoue (1994)	11:02
6.	"Open Url" (from Web)	Laswell, Thaemlitz	Bill Laswell & Terre Thaemlitz (1995)	10:19
7.	"Distal Sonority" (from Somnific Flux)	Harris, Laswell	M.J. Harris & Bill Laswell (1995)	11:18
8.	"Broken Dream" (previously unreleased)	Laswell	Bill Laswell (1996)	7:29

Disc two (Disengage)
No.	Title	Writer(s)	Original artist (date)	Length
1.	"Tangier Space Draft" (from Akasha)	Laswell	Divination (1995)	7:04
2.	"Black Dawn" (from Psychonavigation)	Laswell, Namlook	Bill Laswell & Pete Namlook (1994)	7:20
3.	"Evil Eye" (from Ambient Dub Vol. II)	Laswell	Divination (1993)	7:49
4.	"Port of Entry (The Future Is With Control)" (from Jihad)	Laswell	Automaton (1994)	11:40
5.	"Ancient Evenings" (from Light in Extension)	Laswell	Divination (1994)	7:44
6.	"Zurvan Akarana" (from Visitation)	Laswell, Sharp	Jonah Sharp/Bill Laswell (1994)	8:56
7.	"Asiyah Dub (Blinding the Starry Eyes of God)" (from Dub Terror Exhaust)	Katz, Laswell	Automaton (1994)	9:10
8.	"White Lies" (previously unreleased)	Laswell	Bill Laswell (1996)	6:25

== Personnel ==
- Bill Laswell – bass guitar, producer

== Release history ==
Region	Date	Label	Format	Catalog
United States	1996	M.I.L. Multimedia	CD	ESP 8508
