= ROIR Dub Sessions =

Compilation album by Bill Laswell
- Released: November 18, 2003
- Recorded: Greenpoint Studio, Brooklyn, NY; Orange Music, West Orange, NJ
- Genre: Ambient dub
- Length: 46:14
- Label: ROIR
- Producer: Bill Laswell

Bill Laswell chronology
Final Oscillations (2003)	ROIR Dub Sessions (2003)	Buck Jam Tonic (2003)

Professional ratings
Review scores
Source	Rating
Allmusic	4/5 stars

ROIR Dub Sessions is a compilation album by American composer Bill Laswell, released on November 18, 2003 by ROIR.

== Track listing ==
No.	Title	Writer(s)	Album (date)	Length
1.	"Dread Internal"	Bill Laswell	Chapter One (1996)	9:21
2.	"Thunupa"	Bill Laswell	Chapter Two (1997)	13:35
3.	"Cybotron"	Bill Laswell, Jah Wobble	Dub Chamber 3 (2000)	9:28
4.	"Ethiopia/The Lower Ground"	Bill Laswell, Ejigayehu Shibabaw	Dub Chamber 4 (2002)	13:50

== Personnel ==
Adapted from the ROIR Dub Sessions liner notes.

- Bill Buchen – percussion (2)
- Aïyb Dieng – percussion (4)
- Gigi – vocals (4)
- Graham Haynes – cornet (2)
- Karsh Kale – percussion (4)
- Bill Laswell – bass guitar, drum programming, keyboards, effects, musical arrangements, producer
- Robert Musso – programming (1)
- Style Scott – drum programming (2)
- Nicky Skopelitis – guitar (2, 3)
- Jah Wobble – bass guitar (3)

== Release history ==
Region	Date	Label	Format	Catalog
United States	2003	ROIR	CD	RSCD 9500
