= Subharmonic (record label) =

American independent record label

- Founded: 1993
- Founder: Bill Laswell; John Matarazzo; Robert Soares
- Status: Defunct
- Genre: Ambient, dub
- Country of origin: U.S.
- Location: New York City

Subharmonic was an independent record label based in New York City. It primarily issued music with strong ambient and dub music influence. Its sub-label was Strata Records, which issued all its albums in an opaque black container. The label was founded in 1993 by music producers Bill Laswell, John Matarazzo and Robert Soares. A falling-out with Matarazzo occurred during the mid-nineties, effectively ending the label's activities.

== List of releases ==
=== Main discography ===
No.	Year	Artist	Title	Format
001	1993	Divination	Ambient Dub Volume I	CD, CS
002	1993	Praxis	Sacrifist	CD
003	1993	Divination	Ambient Dub Volume II	CD, CS
004	1993	Chaos Face	Doom Ride	CD
005	1994	Pete Namlook & Bill Laswell	Psychonavigation	CD
006	1994	Jonah Sharp/Bill Laswell	Visitation	CD
007	1994	Praxis	Metatron	CD
008	1994	Painkiller	Execution Ground	CD
009	1994	Bill Laswell/Tetsu Inoue	Cymatic Scan	CD
010	1995	Bill Laswell & Terre Thaemlitz	Web	CD
011	1995	Divination	Akasha	CD
012	1995	M.J. Harris & Bill Laswell	Somnific Flux	CD
013	1995	Lull	Cold Summer	CD
014	1995	Final	One	CD
017	1995	Cypher 7	Security	CD
021	1997	Aïyb Dieng	Rhythmagick	CD

=== Strata discography ===
No.	Year	Artist	Title	Format
0001	1994	Death Cube K	Dreamatorium	CD
0002	1994	Azonic	Halo	CD
0003	1994	Cypher 7	Decoder	CD
0004	1994	Automaton	Dub Terror Exhaust	CD
0005	1994	Automaton	Jihad (Points of Order)	CD
