= Final Oscillations =

Compilation album by Bill Laswell
- Released: May 5, 2003
- Recorded: Greenpoint Studio, Brooklyn, NY; Orange Music, West Orange, NJ
- Genre: Ambient, drum and bass
- Length: 135:50
- Label: Quatermass
- Producer: Bill Laswell

Bill Laswell chronology
Book of Exit: Dub Chamber 4 (2002)	Final Oscillations (2003)	ROIR Dub Sessions (2003)

Final Oscillations is a compilation album by American composer Bill Laswell, released on May 5, 2003 by Quatermass Records. It comprises Oscillations and Oscillations 2 in their entirety in addition to several tracks taken from Oscillations Remixes.

== Track listing ==
All music is composed by Bill Laswell, except where noted.

Disc one
No.	Title	Writer(s)	Length
1.	"Digitaria"	DJ Ninj, Bill Laswell	6:21
2.	"Faktura"		6:11
3.	"Dislocation"		8:01
4.	"Extinguisher"	Robert Musso	7:48
5.	"Third Stage Navigator"		9:00
6.	"Wird"		8:32
7.	"Oscillations Remix" (Nico mix)		8:23
8.	"Digital Cut-up" (Atom Heart mix)		5:55
9.	"Milky Remix" (DJ Grazzhoppa mix)		4:21
10.	"Répercussions" (Spectre mix)		4:50

Disc two
No.	Title	Length
1.	"Virus"	7:36
2.	"Autopia"	8:22
3.	"El Hombre Invisible" (for William S. Burroughs)	16:08
4.	"Red Night"	16:14
5.	"Very Optimistic Dog Mix" (Ui mix)	7:03
6.	"Live Pop Mix" (Vedic Sound mix)	5:56
7.	"Low Membrane Mix" (Scanner mix)	5:09

== Personnel ==
Adapted from the Final Oscillations liner notes.

- Bill Laswell – bass guitar, drum programming, effects, producer
- Robert Musso – engineering

== Release history ==
Region	Date	Label	Format	Catalog
Belgium	2003	Quatermass	CD, LP	QS 137
