= Interpieces Organization =

Studio album by Haruomi Hosono & Bill Laswell
- Released: February 21, 1996
- Studios: Quiet Lodge (Tokyo); Greenpoint (Brooklyn)
- Genres: Ambient; ambient house
- Length: 56:37
- Label: Baidis
- Producers: Haruomi Hosono, Bill Laswell

Bill Laswell chronology
Distill (1996)	Interpieces Organization (1996)	Outland 2 (1996)

Interpieces Organization is a collaborative studio album by Haruomi Hosono and Bill Laswell. It was released on February 21, 1996, by Baidis.

== Track listing ==
All music is composed by Haruomi Hosono and Bill Laswell, except "Bush" by Haruomi Hosono.

No.	Title	Length
1.	"Unfinished Screams"	9:03
2.	"Interpieces"	6:34
3.	"Coiled"	10:49
4.	"Jeephead Shaman"	5:25
5.	"Wakare Michi"	9:08
6.	"Y.S. Tangled In Tokyo"	7:52
7.	"Bush"	8:41

== Personnel ==
Adapted from the Interpieces Organization liner notes.

Musicians

- Haruomi Hosono – effects, producer (1–3, 7)
- Tetsu Inoue – electronics (1, 3, 4, 6)
- Miharu Koshi – voice (1, 4)
- Bill Laswell – effects, producer (1–3)
- Terre Thaemlitz – Remix (5)

Technical

- Bobby Hata – mastering
- Akira Kitajima – cover art
- Robert Musso – engineering (1–3)

== Release history ==
Region	Date	Label	Format	Catalog
Japan	1996	Baidis	CD	TECN-30336
