= Distill (album) =

Studio album by Divination
- Released: February 20, 1996
- Studios: Greenpoint Studio, Brooklyn, NY
- Genre: Ambient
- Length: 102:34
- Label: Sub Meta
- Producers: Anton Fier, Mick Harris, Haruomi Hosono, Tetsu Inoue, Thomas Köner, Bill Laswell, Pete Namlook, Paul Schütze

Divination chronology
Akasha (1995)	Distill (1996)	Sacrifice (1998)

Bill Laswell chronology
Off World One (1996)	Distill (1996)	Interpieces Organization (1996)

Professional ratings
Review scores
Source	Rating
AllMusic	3/5 stars
Alternative Press	3/5 stars

Distill is the fourth album by American composer Bill Laswell released under the moniker Divination. It was released in 1996 by Sub Meta.

== Track listing ==
Disc one
No.	Title	Writer(s)	Artist	Length
1.	"Green Evil"	Schütze	Paul Schütze	11:39
2.	"Subharmonic Invocation of the Dark Spirits"	Namlook	Pete Namlook	12:49
3.	"Ether Vibes"	Hosono, Koshi	Haruomi Hosono	7:54
4.	"There"	Harris	Mick Harris	9:35

Disc two
No.	Title	Writer(s)	Artist	Length
1.	"Zone"	Köner	Thomas Köner	12:01
2.	"Blue Filter"	Fier	Anton Fier	8:25
3.	"Interlink"	Inoue	Tetsu Inoue	10:28
4.	"Black Dangers"	Laswell	Bill Laswell	29:51

== Personnel ==
Adapted from the Distill liner notes.

Musicians

- Knox Chandler – guitar (2.2)
- Anton Fier – instruments and producer (2.2), mastering
- Mick Harris – instruments and producer (1.4)
- Haruomi Hosono – instruments and producer (1.3)
- Tetsu Inoue – instruments and producer (2.3)
- Thomas Köner – instruments and producer (2.1)
- Bill Laswell – instruments and producer (2.4)
- Pete Namlook – instruments and producer (1.2)
- Paul Schütze – instruments and producer (1.1)

Technical

- Bruce Calder – engineering (2.2)
- Robert Musso – engineering (2.4), mastering
- Aldo Sampieri – design

== Release history ==
Region	Date	Label	Format	Catalog
United States	1996	Sub Meta	CD	SM 9803-2
