= City of Light (album) =

City Of Light

Studio album by Bill Laswell
- Released: July 29, 1997
- Studio: Benares, India; Greenpoint (Brooklyn)
- Genre: Ambient
- Length: 44:47
- Label: Sub Rosa
- Producer: Bill Laswell

Bill Laswell chronology
Psychonavigation 3 (1997)	City Of Light (1997)	Dub Meltdown (1997)

Professional ratings
Review scores
Source	Rating
Allmusic	3/5 stars

City Of Light is the sixth solo album by American composer Bill Laswell, released on July 29, 1997, by Sub Rosa.

== Track listing ==
All lyrics are written by Lori Carson.

No.	Title	Music	Length
1.	"Nothing"	Bill Laswell	13:03
2.	"Kála"	John Balance, Peter Christopherson	13:06
3.	"Káshí"	Tetsu Inoue	7:19
4.	"Above The Earth"	Bill Laswell	11:19

== Personnel ==
Adapted from the City Of Light liner notes.

Musicians

- John Balance — sound collage (2)
- Lori Carson — vocals
- Peter Christopherson — sound collage (2)
- Trilok Gurtu — tabla (1)
- Tetsu Inoue — sound collage (3)
- Bill Laswell — sound collage (1, 4), producer, recording

Technical personnel

- Robert Musso — engineering

== Release history ==
Region	Date	Label	Format	Catalog
Belgium	1997	Sub Rosa	CD	SR 114
