= Off World One =

Studio album by Possession
- Released: January 30, 1996
- Studio: Greenpoint Studio, Brooklyn, NY
- Genre: Ambient dub
- Length: 45:33
- Label: Sub Meta
- Producer: Bill Laswell

Bill Laswell chronology
Russian Chants «Parastas» (1995)	Off World One (1996)	Distill (1996)

Off World One is an album by American composer Bill Laswell, issued under the moniker Possession. It was released on January 30, 1996, by Sub Meta.

== Track listing ==
No.	Title	Writer(s)	Length
1.	"Echo"	Bill Laswell, Foday Musa Suso	13:24
2.	"Rainfall"	Bill Laswell, Fousseny Kouyate	10:09
3.	"Shadow Crossing"	Bill Laswell, Foday Musa Suso	12:38
4.	"Ascending"	Fousseny Kouyate	9:20

== Personnel ==
Adapted from the Off World One liner notes.

Musicians

- Aïyb Dieng – percussion
- Fousseny Kouyate – kora
- Bill Laswell – bass guitar, drum programming, effects, musical arrangements, producer
- Foday Musa Suso – balafon

Technical

- Dave McKean – cover art
- Robert Musso – engineering
- Aldo Sampieri – design

== Release history ==
Region	Date	Label	Format	Catalog
United States	1996	Sub Meta	CD	SM 9801-2
