= Outland (Pete Namlook and Bill Laswell album) =

Studio album by Pete Namlook & Bill Laswell
- Released: February 20, 1994
- Recorded: Klanglabor (Frankfurt, Germany)
- Genre: Ambient, drone, electronic
- Length: 62:00
- Label: FAX +49-69/450464
- Producer: Pete Namlook

Bill Laswell chronology
Light in Extension (1994)	Outland (1994)	Psychonavigation (1994)

Professional ratings
Review scores
Source	Rating
Allmusic	2.5/5 stars

Outland is the first collaborative album by Bill Laswell and Pete Namlook, released on February 2, 1994, by FAX +49-69/450464. The album consists of a single track lasting around 62 minutes in length.

== Track listing ==
No.	Title	Writer(s)	Length
1.	"From the Earth to the Ceiling" (Parts I-XII)	Bill Laswell and Pete Namlook	62:00

== Personnel ==
Adapted from the Outland liner notes.

Musicians

- Bill Laswell – electronics
- Pete Namlook – electronics, producer

Technical personnel

- Oz Fritz – recording
- Thi-Linh Le – cover art
- Nicky Skopelitis – recording

== Release history ==
Region	Date	Label	Format	Catalog
Germany	1994	FAX +49-69/450464	CD	PW 19
Germany	1999	Ambient World	CD	aw 022
