= Psychonavigation 2 =

Studio album by Pete Namlook & Bill Laswell
- Released: December 5, 1995
- Studio: Greenpoint (Brooklyn)
- Genre: Ambient, electronic
- Length: 54:39
- Label: FAX +49-69/450464
- Producer: Bill Laswell, Pete Namlook

Bill Laswell chronology
Silent Recoil (1995)	Psychonavigation 2 (1995)	Russian Chants «Parastas» (1995)

Professional ratings
Review scores
Source	Rating
Allmusic	4.5/5 stars

Psychonavigation 2 is a collaborative album by Bill Laswell and Pete Namlook, released on December 5, 1995, by FAX +49-69/450464.

== Track listing ==
All music is composed by Bill Laswell and Pete Namlook.

No.	Title	Length
1.	"Under Heaven"	15:56
2.	"Blue Shift"	13:13
3.	"The Fate of Energy"	9:29
4.	"The Hell of the Same"	14:14
5.	"Infinum"	1:47

== Personnel ==
Adapted from the Psychonavigation 2 liner notes.

Musicians

- Bill Laswell – electronics, producer
- Pete Namlook – electronics, producer

Technical personnel

- Anton Fier – recording
- Thi-Linh Le – cover art
- Robert Musso – recording

== Release history ==
Region	Date	Label	Format	Catalog
Germany	1995	FAX +49-69/450464	CD	PW 24
Germany	2004	Ambient World	CD	aw 037
