= Psychonavigation 3 =

Studio album by Pete Namlook & Bill Laswell
- Released: February 17, 1997
- Recorded: Klanglabor Frankfurt, Germany
- Genre: Ambient, electronic
- Length: 63:46
- Label: FAX +49-69/450464
- Producer: Pete Namlook

Bill Laswell chronology
Mysteries of Creation (1996)	Psychonavigation 3 (1997)	City of Light (1997)

Professional ratings
Review scores
Source	Rating
Allmusic	4/5 stars

Psychonavigation 3 is a collaborative album by Bill Laswell and Pete Namlook, released on February 17, 1997, by FAX +49-69/450464.

== Track listing ==
All music is composed by Bill Laswell and Pete Namlook.

No.	Title	Length
1.	"Telepathy I"	15:31
2.	"Trautoniolo"	4:02
3.	"Mind Transference Control"	16:24
4.	"Mind Over Energy"	12:56
5.	"Vocal Psi"	2:56
6.	"Telepathy II"	4:52
7.	"Lights Out"	7:05

== Personnel ==
Adapted from the Psychonavigation 3 liner notes.

- Bill Laswell – bass guitar, electronics
- Pete Namlook – trautonium, electronics, producer, cover art

== Release history ==
Region	Date	Label	Format	Catalog
Germany	1997	FAX +49-69/450464	CD	PW 33
Germany	2005	Ambient World	CD	aw 038
