= Psychonavigation 4 =

Studio album by Pete Namlook & Bill Laswell
- Released: April 6, 1999
- Recorded: Klanglabor and Hödeshof, Germany
- Genre: Ambient, electronic
- Length: 55:08
- Label: FAX +49-69/450464
- Producer: Pete Namlook

Bill Laswell chronology
Invisible Design (1999)	Psychonavigation 4 (1999)	The End of Law (1999)

Professional ratings
Review scores
Source	Rating
Allmusic	3/5 stars

Psychonavigation 4 is a studio album by the electronic artists Bill Laswell and Pete Namlook. It was released in 1999 through FAX +49-69/450464.

== Track listing ==
All music is composed by Bill Laswell and Pete Namlook.

No.	Title	Length
1.	"Arena"	12:29
2.	"Samira"	7:39
3.	"ENTIB 2060"	17:26
4.	"Good and Bad"	17:34

== Personnel ==
Adapted from the Psychonavigation 4 liner notes.

- Bill Laswell – bass guitar, electronics
- Pete Namlook – electronics, producer, cover art

== Release history ==
Region	Date	Label	Format	Catalog
Germany	1999	FAX +49-69/450464	CD	PW 40
Germany	2006	Ambient World	CD	aw 041
