= Emit Ecaps =

Studio album by Spacetime Continuum

Studio album by Spacetime Continuum
- Released: 6 February 1996
- Studio: Room 202
- Genre: Techno; ambient; jungle; breakbeat; electronica
- Length: 63:30
- Label: Reflective Records; Astralwerks
- Producer: Jonah Sharp

Spacetime Continuum chronology
Sea Biscuit (1994)	Emit Ecaps (1996)	Remit Recaps (1996)

Emit Ecaps is the third album by English techno producer Jonah Sharp under his pseudonym Spacetime Continuum. It was released in February 1996 on Reflective Records in the United Kingdom and on Astralwerks in the United States. After establishing himself as a techno producer but then moving to an ambient style on his previous album Sea Biscuit (1994), Sharp's music on Emit Ecaps balances his techno and ambient styles with influences of drum and bass and jungle music. The name of the album reverses the term 'space time'. Emit Ecaps was a radio success and received acclaim from music journalists who praised Sharp's change in direction. The album was followed in November 1996 by Remit Recaps, a remix album of material from Emit Ecaps, created with the involvement of several producers.

== Background and production ==
Edinburgh-born Jonah Sharp (Spacetime Continuum) began his career as a professional jazz drummer before moving to the United States in 1992. In his home city San Francisco, he established his Reflective Records and recorded the majority of his ensuing work. He signed a record deal with Astralwerks in 1992, who released his techno-styled live debut album Alien Dreamtime in 1992 and the ambient music-styled follow-up Sea Biscuit in 1994, The latter album was released in Europe via Fax Records. Emit Ecaps was the follow-up to Sea Biscuit, and was recorded and produced by Sharp at Room 202. The album was mastered at The Compound, San Francisco, with Mixture 151 credited for providing mastering assistance. Sharp wrote the entire album alone.

== Composition ==
"Emit Ecaps is all about what happens between the beats-or about beats so numerous and varied and highly varied they'll sweep you stop in an ion storm before you can say 4/4."

—Will Hermes, Spin

Emit Ecaps moves Sharp away from ambient music and returns him to his dance music roots, incorporating styles of techno, house and jungle. Kurt B. Reighley of Trouser Press writes that, although still "perfectly suitable as listening music," Emit Ecaps is Spacetime Continuum's first album "that actually invites the listener to dance." He considers Emit Ecaps to move Sharp away from the "intersection of ambient and techno" and instead experiment with the rhythms of drum and bass and jungle. The techno and drum and bass grooves are treated with jazz-styled tension that Prasad Bidaye of Exclaim! considered to better resemble "the feeling of hard bop" than acid jazz.

Sharp's previous ambient style is nonetheless represented on Emit Ecaps via its atmospheric backdrops, unusually clipped waveforms, "3-D mixing" and "the way he can make a hi-hat sizzle 50 different ways in the space of a single song," according to Will Hermes of Spin magazine. The producer's extensive sound palette on the album incorporates juxtaposed timbres and rhythms, applying light breakbeats to slower-moving ambient textures. The album's "elemental electronica" style also incorporates syncopated elements and unusual noises. The resulting musical style has been described as "cyber-step" and "[j]azzed-up breakbeat." Writer Tim Barr writes that some tracks, like "Iform", provide "relatively straight" extrapolations of 'midwest techno', whereas others like "Simm City" and "Movement #2" resemble "peak-era Derrick May vibing out on ambience."

Opening track "Iform" starts the album in a slow fashion until the emergence of a funky bassline after two minutes. "Kairo" begins with elements of ambient music before moving into trip hop territory and then incorporating an acoustic bass line and abstract keyboard work, followed by techno blips. Reighley says that the musical elements on the track slowly move around each other, citing the "jazz bass, staccato keyboard blips, a smidgen of banjo, the fluttering of double-time programmed drums." According to Hermes, the track is closer to acid jazz as a term than musicians working in the genre. The track shares its "devastating beat work" and elements of jungle and electro with "Funkyar," which contains "deftly serene symphonics." "Twister", meanwhile, features different sounds spiralling around space music beats and heavy, thunderous basslines.

== Release and reception ==
Professional ratings
Review scores
Source	Rating
AllMusic	4.5/5 stars
Muzik	4.5/5 stars
Select	4/5 stars
Spin	6/10

Released on 6 February 1996, Emit Ecaps was issued via Reflective Records in the United Kingdom, and via Astralwerks in the United States. The name Emit Ecaps is "space time" backwards. The British version of the record features a hologram sleeve. A radio success, the album reached number one on the CMJ Dance top 25 chart, compiled from weekly reports from an array of radio reporters. The album was promoted with the release of the Kairo EP by Reflective Records; this release also contained the track "Room Kick".

In a contemporary review, Will Hermes of Spin felt that "Kairo" was the album's best track, describing it as a "brilliant seduction" and "among the most visionary 'club' singles of the past year or two." He felt that the rest of the album "still pushes the idea of an electronic music as propulsive and articulate as rock, that speaks in the open codes of improv and looks beyond the limits of sequencers to see what's going on in the rest of the world." Emma Warren of Select noted the warmth and "sense of geographical dislocation" that runs through the album, feeling that the record has a "heart-rendering" core beneath its "strange noises and syncopations." She concluded that "Reflective never tire of turning electronic music as we know it on its head."

John Bush of AllMusic retrospectively named Emit Ecaps an "Album Pick" and wrote that it retains much of the "atmospheric beauty" of Sea Biscuit, but added that "the material usually works only as an introduction to devastating beat work on tracks like 'Kairo' and 'Funkyar,' both of which recall the chunkier side of jungle and electro quite convincingly." He concluded that the album "is a fascinating fusion of hard and soft." Kurt B. Reighley of Trouser Press said that Emit Ecaps finds Sharp "experimenting successfully with the rhythms of jungle/drum and bass culture." Prasad Bidaye of Exclaim! consider the album to be "a colourful offering of optimistic drum & bass and techno grooves."

Charles Aaron of Spin wrote in late 1996 that Emit Ecaps was among several electronic albums that bore "mystifying creativity" from the previous few years. In his book Techno: The Rough Guide, Tim Barr considers the album to be a "solid follow-up to Sea Biscuit." He wrote that although Emit Ecaps was "[l]ess unrelentingly strange than [Sharp's project] Reagenz, it nevertheless boasted some star-tlingly original moments." He also described "Movement #2" as "gorgeous". Corey Moss of MTV News writes that Emit Ecaps is "considered a landmark of organic ambient electronic music." Writer Paul Morley included the album in a list of 100 great albums "that map out the universe as it is because of Kraftwerk." The album was followed-up with a remix album of its material, Remit Recaps, featuring remixes from producers including Autechre and Plaid. It was released on 7 November 1996 as a CD and two separate twelve-inch singles. Option called Emit Ecaps a "pretty outstanding established template" for the remix album.

== Track listing ==
All tracks written by Jonah Sharp.

1. "Iform" – 6:42
2. "Kairo" – 11:48
3. "Simm City" – 2:51
4. "Funkyar" – 2:46
5. "Swing Fantasy" – 6:58
6. "Out Here" – 4:39
7. "Vertigo" – 7:29
8. "Twister" – 4:19
9. "Pod" – 6:26
10. "String of Pearls" – 6:42

== Personnel ==
- Jonah Sharp – producer, writer
- Mixture 151 – mastering assistance
