= Outland 2 =

Studio album by Pete Namlook & Bill Laswell
- Released: April 9, 1996
- Studio: Klanglabor (Frankfurt, Germany)
- Genre: Ambient, electronic
- Length: 59:18
- Label: FAX +49-69/450464
- Producer: Pete Namlook

Bill Laswell chronology
Interpieces Organization (1996)	Outland 2 (1996)	Chapter One: Book of Entrance (1996)

Professional ratings
Review scores
Source	Rating
Allmusic	4.5/5 stars

Outland 2 is a collaborative album by Bill Laswell and Pete Namlook, released on April 9, 1996, by FAX +49-69/450464.

== Track listing ==
All music is composed by Bill Laswell and Pete Namlook.

No.	Title	Length
1.	"African Virus: Electronic Sonata With a Cold Loved by Nature" (Part I)	9:30
2.	"African Virus: Electronic Sonata With a Cold Loved by Nature" (Part II)	9:28
3.	"African Virus: Electronic Sonata With a Cold Loved by Nature" (Part III)	18:09
4.	"African Virus: Electronic Sonata With a Cold Loved by Nature" (Part IV)	5:48
5.	"African Virus: Electronic Sonata With a Cold Loved by Nature" (Part V)	6:08
6.	"African Virus: Electronic Sonata With a Cold Loved by Nature" (Part VI)	10:15

== Personnel ==
Adapted from the Outland 2 liner notes.

Musicians

- Bill Laswell – electronics
- Pete Namlook – electronics, producer

Technical personnel

- Oz Fritz – recording
- Thi-Linh Le – cover art

== Release history ==
Region	Date	Label	Format	Catalog
Germany	1996	FAX +49-69/450464	CD	PW 28
