= Nagual Site =

Studio album by Sacred System
- Released: August 25, 1998
- Studio: Orange Music (West Orange, N.J.)
- Genre: Ambient dub
- Length: 45:48
- Label: Wicklow
- Producer: Bill Laswell

Sacred System chronology
Chapter Two (1997)	Nagual Site (1998)	Book of Exit: Dub Chamber 4 (2002)

Bill Laswell chronology
Jazzonia (1998)	Nagual Site (1998)	Sacrifice (1998)

Professional ratings
Review scores
Source	Rating
Allmusic	4.5/5 stars

Nagual Site is the third album by American composer Bill Laswell issued under the moniker Sacred System. It was released on August 25, 1998, by Wicklow.

== Track listing ==
No.	Title	Writer(s)	Length
1.	"Raag Sohni"	Bill Buchen, Gulam Mohamed Khan	5:55
2.	"Black Lotus"	Bill Laswell	10:13
3.	"X-Zibit-I"	Graham Haynes, Bill Laswell	7:45
4.	"Dèrive"	Byard Lancaster, Bill Laswell	5:24
5.	"Saiya Nikasegaye"	Bill Buchen, Gulam Mohamed Khan	6:13
6.	"Driftwork"	Clive Bell, Bill Laswell, Jah Wobble	8:53
7.	"Aab Yaad Kar Tu"	Bill Buchen, Gulam Mohamed Khan	7:38

== Personnel ==
Adapted from the Nagual Site liner notes. Musicians

- Clive Bell – khene, shakuhachi
- Bill Buchen – slit drum, tablas, ektārā, musical arrangements (1, 5, 8)
- Sussan Deyhim – voice
- Aïyb Dieng – bells, chatan pot drums
- Hamid Drake – drums, frame drum
- Craig Harris – trombone
- Graham Haynes – cornet
- Zakir Hussain – tabla
- Gulam Mohamed Khan – harmonium, voice, musical arrangements (1, 5, 8)
- Bill Laswell – bass guitar, keyboards, percussion, musical arrangements, producer
- Byard Lancaster – soprano saxophone
- David Liebman – soprano saxophone
- Badal Roy – tabla, voice
- Nicky Skopelitis – six-string guitar, twelve-string guitar
- Jah Wobble – bass guitar
- Bernie Worrell – electric piano, organ

Technical

- Michael Fossenkemper – mastering
- James Koehnline – illustrations
- Robert Musso – engineering

== Release history ==
Region	Date	Label	Format	Catalog
United States	1998	BMG Classics, Wicklow	CD	09026 63263 2
