= Charles Uzzell-Edwards =

Welsh graffiti artist

Charles Uzzell-Edwards "Pure Evil"
- Born: Charles Uzzell-Edwards; 1968 (age 56–57)
- Style: Street art
- Movement: Graffiti
- Father: John Uzzell Edwards
- Website: Charles Uzzell-Edwards on Instagram

Charles Uzzell-Edwards (born 1968) is a Welsh graffiti artist known by the moniker "Pure Evil". He is the son of painter John Uzzell Edwards.

== Career ==
In the early 1990s, Uzzell-Edwards was one of the designers for Anarchic Adjustment with Alan Brown and Nick Philip and released electronic ambient music on Pete Namlook's FAX label, recording "Octopus" 1, 2 & 3 and "Dada" (under the pseudonym Drum Machine Circle) solo, producing "A New Consciousness" and "Create" 1 & 2 with Pete Namlook, recording "Supergroup" with Thomas Bullock, and "Audio" with Tetsu Inoue and Daimon Beail. He runs the Pure Evil Gallery in Shoreditch, London.

In 2011, Uzzell-Edwards created a special edition of prints to raise money for the victims of the 2011 Tōhoku earthquake and tsunami.

In the spring of 2016, Uzzell-Edwards served as artist-in-residence of the Quin Arts program at the Quin Hotel in New York City. His solo exhibit, curated by DK Johnston, channeled Andy Warhol, creating a body of work rooted in repetition art.
