= Second Nature (Atom Heart, Tetsu Inoue and Bill Laswell album) =

Studio album by Atom Heart/Tetsu Inoue/Bill Laswell
- Released: August 14, 1995
- Studio: Greenpoint (Brooklyn)
- Genre: Ambient
- Length: 68:35
- Label: FAX +49-69/450464
- Producer: Atom Heart, Tetsu Inoue, Bill Laswell

Bill Laswell chronology
Funkcronomicon (1995)	Second Nature (1995)	Silent Recoil (1995)

Professional ratings
Review scores
Source	Rating
Allmusic	2.5/5 stars

Second Nature is a collaborative album by Atom Heart, Tetsu Inoue and Bill Laswell. It was released on August 14, 1995, by FAX +49-69/450464.

== Track listing ==
All music is composed by Atom Heart, Tetsu Inoue and Bill Laswell.

No.	Title	Length
1.	"Synthetic Forest"	28:42
2.	"Green Paste"	16:59
3.	"Artificial Seaside"	16:29
4.	"Landing Circle"	6:25

== Personnel ==
Adapted from the Second Nature liner notes.

Musicians

- Atom Heart – effects, producer
- Tetsu Inoue – effects, producer
- Bill Laswell – effects, producer

Technical personnel

- Layng Martine – assistant engineer, editing
- Dave McKean – cover art
- Robert Musso – engineering
- Aldo Sampieri – design

== Release history ==
Region	Date	Label	Format	Catalog
Germany	1995	FAX +49-69/450464	CD	PS 08/78
United States	1996	Sub Meta	CD	SM-9802-2
