= Ambiant Otaku =

Studio album by Tetsu Inoue
- Released: March 28, 1994
- Genre: Ambient
- Label: FAX +49-69/450464
- Producer: Tetsu Inoue

Tetsu Inoue chronology
| Shades of Orion (1993) | Ambiant Otaku (1994) | 2350 Broadway II (1994) |

Professional ratings
Review scores
| Source | Rating |
|---|---|
| Allmusic | 4/5 stars |

Ambiant Otaku (Note: [sic] The title is spelt using the French Ambiant instead of the English spelling of Ambient.) is the debut studio album by Japanese ambient artist Tetsu Inoue, released on 28 March 1994. The album consists of five long ambient songs. Like many FAX +49-69/450464 releases, it was released not under the artist's name, but under a pseudonym matching the album title.

== Track listing ==
All tracks are written by Tetsu Inoue.

| No. | Title | Length |
|---|---|---|
| 1. | "Karmic Light" | 17:04 |
| 2. | "Low of Vibration" | 11:11 |
| 3. | "Ambiant Otaku" | 10:49 |
| 4. | "Holy Dance" | 15:36 |
| 5. | "Magnetic Field" | 17:48 |
| Total length: | | 72:27 |
