= Psychonavigation 5 =

Studio album by Pete Namlook & Bill Laswell
- Released: March 13, 2002
- Recorded: Klanglabor and Hödeshof, Germany
- Genre: Ambient, electronic
- Length: 51:47
- Label: FAX +49-69/450464
- Producer: Pete Namlook

Bill Laswell chronology
Points of Order (2001)	Psychonavigation 5 (2002)	Book of Exit (2002)

Professional ratings
Review scores
Source	Rating
Allmusic	4/5 stars

Psychonavigation 5 is a collaborative album by Bill Laswell and Pete Namlook, released on March 13, 2002, by FAX +49-69/450464.

== Track listing ==
All music is composed by Bill Laswell and Pete Namlook.

No.	Title	Length
1.	"The Catalyst"	7:23
2.	"Cryosleep" (Part I: Preparation)	10:33
3.	"Cryosleep" (Part II: Running into a Dream)	5:39
4.	"Cryosleep" (Part III: Holy Man)	8:50
5.	"Cryosleep" (Part IV: Alien Particles)	7:39
6.	"Life Eternal"	11:43

== Personnel ==
Adapted from the Psychonavigation 5 liner notes.

- Bill Laswell – bass guitar, drum programming, electronics
- Pete Namlook – electronics, synthesizer, trautonium, producer
- Andre Ruello – cover art

== Release history ==
Region	Date	Label	Format	Catalog
Germany	2002	FAX +49-69/450464	CD	PW 45
