= Reflective Records =

American electronic music record label

Reflective Records is an independent San Francisco-based record label for electronic music, operated by Jonah Sharp and his wife. The first release was the Fluorescence 12" EP by Spacetime Continuum, which was released in August 1993 with an initial pressing of 500 copies. In the mid-1990s, Reflective's releases were known for featuring holograms on the CD or record cover, as well as on the label in the middle of the record.

Artists that have released on Reflective:

- Blaktronics
- Kid Spatula (real name: Mike Paradinas, also known as μ-ziq)
- Me-Sheen
- MLO (members: Jonathon Tye and Peter Smith)
- Move D (real name: David Moufang)
- Single Cell Orchestra (real name: Miguel Angelo Fierro)
- Spacetime Continuum (real name: Jonah Sharp)
- Subtropic (real name: Jake Smith)
- Velocette (real name: Jason Williams)
- Vulva (members: Tom Melchior and Tim Hutton)

== See also ==
- List of record labels
