= Outland IV =

Studio album by Pete Namlook & Bill Laswell
- Released: February 5, 2000
- Recorded: Klanglabor Frankfurt & Traben-Trarbach, Germany
- Genre: Ambient, electronic
- Length: 50:25
- Label: FAX +49-69/450464
- Producer: Pete Namlook

Bill Laswell chronology
Permutation (1999)	Outland IV (2000)	Emerald Aether: Shape Shifting (2000)

Professional ratings
Review scores
Source	Rating
Allmusic	4/5 stars

Outland IV is a collaborative album by Bill Laswell and Pete Namlook, released on February 5, 2000 by FAX +49-69/450464.

== Track listing ==
All music is composed by Bill Laswell and Pete Namlook.

No.	Title	Length
1.	"The Old World"	5:15
2.	"East Meets West"	2:57
3.	"Our Small Blue World"	4:52
4.	"Bella Prime"	4:55
5.	"Physical Transformation"	4:40
6.	"African Dub"	9:14
7.	"East Leaves West"	6:26
8.	"DSPill"	12:06

== Personnel ==
Adapted from the Outland IV liner notes.

- Bill Laswell – electronics
- Pete Namlook – electronics, producer
- Andre Ruello – cover art

== Release history ==
Region	Date	Label	Format	Catalog
Germany	2000	FAX +49-69/450464	CD	PW 43
Germany	2004	Ambient World	CD	aw 036
