= Invisible Design =

Studio album by Bill Laswell
- Released: March 23, 1999
- Recorded: Orange Music, West Orange, NJ
- Genre: Ambient
- Length: 46:52
- Label: Tzadik
- Producer: Bill Laswell

Bill Laswell chronology
Sacrifice (1998)	Invisible Design (1999)	Psychonavigation 4 (1999)

Professional ratings
Review scores
Source	Rating
AllMusic	4.5/5 stars
The Encyclopedia of Popular Music	3/5 stars
Pitchfork Media	9.5/10

Invisible Design is the eighth solo album by the American composer Bill Laswell, released on March 23, 1999, by Tzadik Records.

== Track listing ==
All music is composed by Bill Laswell.

No.	Title	Length
1.	"Black Aether"	4:19
2.	"Commander Guevara"	7:02
3.	"Oceans of Borrowed Money"	5:10
4.	"Aisha"	5:41
5.	"Night Air & Low Frequency"	9:15
6.	"White Arc Spiral"	5:38
7.	"Aghora"	9:47

== Personnel ==
Adapted from the Invisible Design liner notes.

Musicians

- Bill Laswell – bass guitar, drum programming, effects, producer

Technical personnel

- Ikue Mori – design
- Robert Musso – engineering
- Allan Tucker – mastering

== Release history ==
Region	Date	Label	Format	Catalog
United States	1999	Tzadik	CD	TZ 7044
