= Andrew Deutsch =

American sound artist

Andrew Deutsch (born 1968) is a sound artist who also teaches at the New York State College of Ceramics at Alfred University. Deutsch is a member of the Institute for Electronic Art at Alfred University and the Pauline Oliveros Foundation Board of Advisors.

== Life and work ==
Deutsch was born in Keene, New Hampshire, and received his BFA in Video Art and Printmaking from Alfred University in 1990. He obtained his MFA in Integrated Electronic Art from Rensselaer Polytechnic Institute in 1994. Since 1998 Deutsch has released over 14 CDRs of solo electronic music on his Magic If Recordings label. Each Magic If edition showcases his experimental music and graphic art and is distributed exclusively in the United States by Anomalous Records.

Deutsch has collaborated with various artists, including: Harald Bode (posthumously), Tetsu Inoue, Pauline Oliveros, Ann Hamilton, Joseph Nechvatal, Tony Conrad and Stephen Vitiello. His collaborative piece Empty Words 4 with John Cage and Yvar Mikshoff has been accepted into the limited archives of the John Cage Trust. There are re-mixes of Deutsch's CD Garden Music on Oval’s OvalProcess, and Microstoria’s Improvisers. Deutsch is a former member of the Pauline Oliveros Foundation Board of Directors (1999 - 2001).

In 1998 Deutsch formed Carrier Band with Peer Bode and Pauline Oliveros, producing the recordings Carrier and Automatic Inscription of Speech Melody. Deutsch is also a regular collaborator with Peer Bode and Jessie Shefrin on both sound and video projects. Deutsch is the recipient of an Artists Fellowship in Video Art (1997) from the New York Foundation for the Arts and a Special Opportunity Stipend from the New York Foundation for the Arts (1999).

Deutsch has also made video work at the Experimental Television Center in Owego, New York. Deutsch's The Sun was listed as "best of 2005 in music" by Artforum Magazine. He has audio work released by Anomalous Records, Institute for Electronic Arts, and Deep Listening, all of which can be found at Forced Exposure.

Since 2010 Deutsch has produced 3 hours of sound/video works with Keith Rowe, CDs with Yuya Ota, Stephen Vitiello, Emil Schult of Kraftwerk, Don Metz and Rebekkah Palov. His video collaborations include "Yu are the Magic" at City Place - Culture Lab, Palm Beach Florida, The Everson Museum, Syracuse New York, and the Burchfield Penny Art Center. He created electronic music and video projections for Ed Sanders' opera Cassandra.

== See also ==
- Ambient Music
- Minimal music
- Electronic Music
- Noise Music
- Chip music
- Circuit bending
- Sonic artifact
