= Doom Ride =

Studio album by Chaos Face
- Released: July 8, 1994
- Recorded: Greenpoint Studio, Brooklyn, NY
- Genre: Hardcore, ambient, electronic
- Length: 44:07
- Label: Subharmonic
- Producer: Bill Laswell

Bill Laswell chronology
Psychonavigation (1994)	Doom Ride (1994)	Cymatic Scan (1994)

Professional ratings
Review scores
Source	Rating
Allmusic	3/5 stars

Doom Ride is an album by American composer Bill Laswell, released under the moniker Chaos Face. It was released on July 8, 1994, by Subharmonic.

== Track listing ==
All music is composed by Bill Laswell.

No.	Title	Length
1.	"Subhuman"	11:38
2.	"Crash"	9:13
3.	"Scanner"	12:21
4.	"Body Hammer"	4:27
5.	"Flatland"	6:28

== Personnel ==
Adapted from the Doom Ride liner notes.

Musicians

- Mick Harris – voice (1)
- Bill Laswell – bass guitar, drum programming, loops, effects, producer
- Shin Terai – voice (2, 4)

Technical personnel

- Thi-Linh Le – photography
- Layng Martine – assistant engineer
- Robert Musso – engineering, editing, programming
- Aldo Sampieri – design
- Howie Weinberg – mastering
- Peter Wetherbee – recording (5), photography

== Release history ==
Region	Date	Label	Format	Catalog
Germany	1994	Subharmonic	CD	SD 7004-2
Japan	1994	Toy's Factory	CD	TFCK-88713
