= Buck Jam Tonic =

Studio album by John Zorn, Bill Laswell & Tatsuya Nakamura
- Released: 2003
- Recorded: December 6, 2002, Victor Studio, Tokyo
- Genre: Avant-garde
- Length: 100:48
- Label: WildDisk WDD-004/005
- Producer: Tsutomu Fujii

John Zorn chronology
The Unknown Masada (2003)	Buck Jam Tonic (2003)	Filmworks XIV: Hiding and Seeking (2003)

Bill Laswell chronology
ROIR Dub Sessions (2003)	Buck Jam Tonic (2003)	AFTERMATHematics (2003)

Buck Jam Tonic is a double album of improvised music by John Zorn, Bill Laswell & Tatsuya Nakamura released on the Japanese WildDisk label in 2003 and consists of one disc mixed in Tokyo and another mixed in New York City. A vinyl edition was also released containing only the Tokyo mix.

== Track listing ==
All compositions by Nakamura/Laswell/Zorn

- Disc one: Tokyo mix
1. "Old Dragon" - 4:53
2. "Lobo" - 7:18
3. "Matagi" - 5:39
4. "Toccata for Coyote" - 10:20
5. "Nu" - 4:53
- Disc two: NY mix
1. "Tzu" - 23:29
2. "Second Sight" - 28:37
3. "Panepha" - 15:39

== Personnel ==
Adapted from the Buck Jam Tonic liner notes.

- John Zorn – alto saxophone, soprano saxophone
- Bill Laswell – bass
- Tatsuya Nakamura – drums
