= Yellow Fever! =

Studio album by Señor Coconut
- Released: June 20, 2006
- Genre: Latin Dance, Electronic
- Label: Essay Recordings
- Producer: Jean Trouillet

Señor Coconut chronology
Fiesta Songs (2003)	Yellow Fever! (2006)

Professional ratings
Review scores
Source	Rating
Allmusic	4/5 stars
Stylus Magazine	(B)

Yellow Fever! is a 2006 tribute album by Señor Coconut Y Su Conjunto (Uwe Schmidt). It is an album of covers done in a Latin American style.

It is a tribute album dedicated to the Yellow Magic Orchestra, and is similar to his earlier Kraftwerk tribute album released in 2000. The three original members of the Yellow Magic Orchestra (Ryuichi Sakamoto, Haruomi Hosono, and Yukihiro Takahashi) appear on this album as well as Towa Tei and Mouse on Mars.

Between each cover song, there are small original interludes by Senor Coconut.

== Track listing ==
1. "My Name Is Coco (Introduction)" – 0:20
2. "Yellow Magic (Tong Poo)" [Rumba]
3. "Coco Agogo" – 0:36
4. "Limbo" [Mambo] – 3:21
5. "What Is a Coconut? (Interlude)"
6. "Behind the Mask" – 3:22
7. "El Coco Rallado (Retro Interlude)" – 0:25
8. "Pure Jam" [Mambo]
9. "Mambo Numerique"
10. "Simoon" [Bolero] – 6:48
11. "El Coco Loco" – 0:18
12. "The Madmen" [Mambo] – 3:51
13. "What Is Coconut? (Interlude)" – 0:32
14. "Music Plans" – 4:36
15. "Breaking Music (Interlude)"
16. "Rydeen" [Merengue] – 4:26
17. "El Coco Roto (Interlude "Cabezón" Style)" – 0:19
18. "Ongaku" – 3:19
19. "What Is Coconut?" – 0:33
20. "Firecracker" [Merengue] – 5:32
21. "Señor Coconut And His Orchestra" – 0:06
