= Stephen Vitiello =

Visual and sound artist (born 1964)

Stephen Vitiello (born 1964 in New York City) is an American visual and sound artist who has released numerous ambient minimal noise electronic audio albums throughout the past three decades. Originally a punk guitarist, Vitiello was early on influenced towards art by working for video artist Nam June Paik whom he met in 1991. In order to transform incidental atmospheric noises into mesmerizing soundscapes that alter our perception of the surrounding environment, he frequently works with Moog Music ring modulators, hard disk recorders, Schoeps CMXY stereo [condenser] microphones and Sennheiser MKH short shotgun microphones.

Vitiello has had solo exhibitions of sound installations, photographs and drawings at museums and galleries including The Project in New York City, MASS MoCA, the High Line, Museum 52 in Los Angeles and Galerie Almine Rech in Paris. Group exhibitions include Soundings: A Contemporary Score at the Museum of Modern Art, the 2002 Whitney Biennial, the 2006 Sydney Biennale and Ce qui arrive (Unknown Quantity) curated by Paul Virilio at the Cartier Foundation in Paris.

CD and LP releases include Captiva with Taylor Deupree (12k), The Sound of Red Earth (Kaldor Public Art Projects), Box Music with Machinefabriek (12k), Listening to Donald Judd (Sub Rosa), The Gorilla Variations (12k), Buffalo Bass Delay (Hallwalls) and Second, with Brendan Canty and Hahn Rowe (Balmat).

Vitiello is currently a professor in the Kinetic Imaging department at Virginia Commonwealth University and lives in Richmond, Virginia.

== Residencies ==
Vitiello was a resident artist at the World Trade Center in 1999 where he recorded sounds from the 91st floor using home-built contact microphones, as well as photocells and used that material in his Bright and Dusty Things album (New Albion Records) as well as in an installation environment, World Trade Center Recordings: Winds After Hurricane Floyd. Other residencies include the Robert Rauschenberg Residency in Captiva, Florida, the Sirius Art Centre in the Cobh-Glanmire municipal district of east Cork Ireland and at Massachusetts Institute of Technology in Boston.

== Collaborations ==
Vitiello has collaborated with Pauline Oliveros, Robin Rimbaud (aka Scanner), Eighth Blackbird, Andrew Deutsch, Steve Roden and Frances-Marie Uitti; as well as visual artists Julie Mehretu, Tony Oursler and Joan Jonas. Vitiello has also collaborated with Harald Bode (posthumously), Nam June Paik, Taylor Deupree, Lawrence English, Ryuichi Sakamoto, Brendan Canty and Jem Cohen among others.

== Awards ==
Vitiello has received several awards, including a Guggenheim Fellowship for Fine Arts in 2011, Creative Capital's Emerging Fields, and an Alpert/Ucross Award for Music.

== See also ==
- Ambient Music
- Minimal music
- Electronic Music
- Noise Music
- Chip music
- Circuit bending
- Sonic artifact
