= Silent Recoil: Dub System One =

Studio album by Bill Laswell
- Released: September 27, 1995
- Studio: Greenpoint (Brooklyn)
- Genre: Downtempo
- Length: 54:21
- Label: Low
- Producer: Bill Laswell

Bill Laswell chronology
Second Nature (1995)	Silent Recoil: Dub System One (1995)	Psychonavigation 2 (1995)

Professional ratings
Review scores
Source	Rating
AllMusic	2/5 stars
Muzik	2.5/5 stars

Silent Recoil: Dub System One is the fourth solo album by American composer Bill Laswell. It was released on September 27, 1995, by Low.

== Track listing ==
All music is composed by Bill Laswell.

No.	Title	Length
1.	"Amphora"	10:29
2.	"Sombre Stream"	15:17
3.	"Undercurrent (Endless Light in the Nameless Land)"	28:35

== Personnel ==
Adapted from the Silent Recoil: Dub System One liner notes.

- Bill Laswell – bass guitar, drum programming, effects, producer
- Edgard Moscatelli – cover art
- Robert Musso – engineering

== Release history ==
Region	Date	Label	Format	Catalog
United States	1995	Low	CD	LW 001
