= Web (album) =

Studio album by Bill Laswell & Terre Thaemlitz
- Released: January 24, 1995
- Studio: Greenpoint and Meow (New York)
- Genre: Ambient
- Length: 50:47
- Label: Subharmonic
- Producer: Bill Laswell, Terre Thaemlitz

Bill Laswell chronology
Outer Dark (1994)	Web (1995)	Somnific Flux (1995)

Professional ratings
Review scores
Source	Rating
Allmusic	3/5 stars

Web is a collaborative album by Bill Laswell and Terre Thaemlitz, released on January 24, 1995, by Subharmonic.

== Track listing ==
All music is composed by Bill Laswell and Terre Thaemlitz.

No.	Title	Length
1.	"Open URL"	16:15
2.	"Insectoidal Regression"	17:07
3.	"Transfer Complete"	17:25

== Personnel ==
Adapted from the Web liner notes.

Musicians

- Bill Laswell – instruments, musical arrangements, producer
- Terre Thaemlitz – instruments, musical arrangements, producer

Technical

- Layng Martine – assistant engineer
- Robert Musso – engineering

== Release history ==
Region	Date	Label	Format	Catalog
United States	1995	Subharmonic	CD	SD 7010-2
