= Pop Artificielle =

Studio album by lb
- Released: 1998
- Recorded: 1998
- Genre: Electronic
- Length: 39:39
- Label: KK
- Producer: Uwe Schmidt (lb)

Professional ratings
Review scores
Source	Rating
Allmusic	link

Pop Artificielle is a 1998 album by "lb" (which refers to "Lassigue Bendthaus", one of the many aliases of musician Uwe Schmidt). All of the songs are covers of pop songs from the 1960s, 70s, and 80s. The entire album, as the title implies, is designed to sound very synthetic, incorporating special vocal processing and elements of glitch music.

It was originally released on KK Records in Belgium in 1998 (cat. no. KK 141); it was licensed to various companies. The album was released in the U.S. by Shadow Records in 2000 and peaked at #32 on the CMJ RPM Charts.

== Track listing ==
1. "Superbad" (Soul Substitute) – 3:18
2. "Be Near Me" (Backup Read Error) – 3:50
3. "Sunshine Superman" (Stereo Phase Update) – 3:45
4. "The Future" (Spiritual Surface Noise) – 4:14
5. "Jealous Guy" (Poeme Syncope) – 4:19
6. "You Are in My System" (Funky Linear) – 4:31
7. "Ashes to Ashes" (Digital Spacepop Replicant) – 4:34
8. "Thatness and Thereness" (Mental Organic) – 3:17
9. "Angie" (Miniature Numerique) – 4:18
10. "Silence is Golden" (Moral Morph) – 3:29

== Personnel ==
- Uwe Schmidt (lb) – Programming, arrangement, vocals, vocal raw material, Raw software development
- Raw software – Vocals
- Lisa Carbon – Moog solo on "Superbad", backing vocals on "Silence is Golden"
- S3200 – Datadump noises, fills, breaks
- MPC3000 – Rhythm

== Notes ==
Songwriting credits for the songs, followed by the group that performed them (if different):

1. "Superbad" (James Brown); 1970
2. "Be Near Me" (Mark White / Martin Fry); ABC; 1985
3. "Sunshine Superman" (Donovan); 1965
4. "The Future" (Prince); 1989
5. "Jealous Guy" (John Lennon); 1971
6. "You Are in My System" (Mic Murphy / David Frank); The System; 1982
7. "Ashes to Ashes" (David Bowie); 1980
8. "Thatness and Thereness" (Ryuichi Sakamoto); 1980
9. "Angie" (Mick Jagger / Keith Richards); The Rolling Stones; 1973
10. "Silence is Golden" (Bob Crewe / Bob Gaudio); The Four Seasons; 1964

Recorded at Sel I/S/C (Frankfurt) and Mira Musica (Santiago de Chile).

== Additional information ==
Schmidt designed and programmed the software (called "Raw") that creates the unique vocal effect heard on the album. From the liner notes: "Raw does vocal simulation based on vocal resynthesis generated from original vocal raw material."
