= John Uzzell Edwards =

Welsh painter (1934–2014)

- Born: 10 October 1934; Deri, Wales.
- Died: 5 March 2014 (aged 79); Rhiwfawr, Wales.
- Known for: Painting
- Movement: Pure painting
- Awards: Granada Arts Fellowship, York University. . British Prix de Rome, British School in Rome. Images of Wales, National Eisteddfod of Wales. Portraits of Welsh People, National Eisteddfod of Wales. Artist in Residence, Glynn Vivian Art Gallery. Honorary member of York University. Welsh Arts Council travel scholarship.

John Uzzell Edwards (10 October 1934 – 5 March 2014) was a Welsh painter. He was also the father of artist Charles Uzzell Edwards.

== Early life ==
Uzzell Edwards was born in 1934, in Deri; a coal-mining village in the Rhymney Valley. He attended Bargoed Grammar School and later took a series of jobs, where he was made redundant but made enough money to be able to move to Paris in 1956, where he could pursue his interest in painting, visiting galleries and museums in the French capital. However, he later returned to Wales, where he worked in Pembrokeshire and exhibited in Tenby.

== Art-work ==
Uzzell Edwards was inspired by Welsh and Celtic art and craft, including Welsh quilts, Celtic crosses and stone inscriptions, mediaeval tiles and ancient manuscripts. He describes his technique as being concerned with pure painting, rather than picture making. He exhibited widely across the UK and internationally including the Inter-Celtic festival at L'Orient, Brittany.
In 1996 he was commissioned by the Shakespeare Institute of the University of Birmingham to paint any Shakespearean character. He chose Owain Glyndŵr.

== Later life ==
Uzzell Edwards lived and worked in Rhiwfawr and Tenby. In 1998 he formed Ysbryd – Spirit Wales, exhibiting with other Welsh painters including Brendan Stuart Burns and Martyn Jones. He died in March 2014.

== Awards ==
- 1966: Awarded the Granada Arts Fellowship by York University.
- 1968: Received the British Prix de Rome at the British School in Rome.
- 1972: Images of Wales winner at the National Eisteddfod of Wales.
- 1973: Portraits of Welsh People winner at the National Eisteddfod of Wales.
- 1986: Made '’Artist in Residence'’ at the Glynn Vivian Art Gallery, Swansea.
- 1986: Made an honorary member of York University.
- 1988: Received a Welsh Arts Council Travel scholarship to study Celtic art in Europe.

== Selected exhibitions ==
- 2013: "A Welsh Journey", Saint David's Hall Exhibition Space, Cardiff.
- 2004: Museum of Modern Art Wales, Machynlleth.
- 2003: The National Museum and Gallery of Wales, Cardiff.
- 2001: The Mall Galleries, London.
- 2000: Tenby Museum and Art Gallery.
- 1999: The Humphries Gallery, San Francisco.
