= Cymatic Scan =

Studio album by Bill Laswell/Tetsu Inoue
- Released: July 11, 1994
- Studio: Greenpoint Studios, Brooklyn, NY
- Genre: Dark ambient, electronic
- Length: 62:09
- Label: FAX +49-69/450464

Bill Laswell chronology
Doom Ride (1994)	Cymatic Scan (1994)	Dub Terror Exhaust (1994)

Tetsu Inoue chronology
2350 Broadway II (1994)	Cymatic Scan (1994)	Organic Cloud (1995)

Professional ratings
Review scores
Source	Rating
AllMusic	3/5 stars

Cymatic Scan is a collaborative album by Bill Laswell and Tetsu Inoue. It was released on July 11, 1994, by FAX +49-69/450464.

== Track listing ==
All music is composed by Tetsu Inoue and Bill Laswell.

No.	Title	Length
1.	"Monochrome Existence" (part 1)	10:00
2.	"Monochrome Existence" (part 2)	10:00
3.	"Monochrome Existence" (part 3)	9:59
4.	"Monochrome Existence" (part 4)	10:00
5.	"Monochrome Existence" (part 5)	10:00
6.	"Monochrome Existence" (part 6)	11:12

== Personnel ==
Adapted from the Cymatic Scan liner notes.

Musicians

- Tetsu Inoue – musical arrangements
- Bill Laswell – musical arrangements

Technical

- Ernst Haas – photography
- Layng Martine – assistant engineer
- Robert Musso – engineering, programming

== Release history ==
Region	Date	Label	Format	Catalog
Germany	1994	FAX +49-69/450464	CD	PS 08/50
United States	1995	Subharmonic	CD	SD 7009-2
