= Mysteries of Creation =

Compilation album by Axiom Dub
- Released: October 22, 1996
- Studio: Greenpoint (Brooklyn)
- Genre: Ambient
- Length: 116:42
- Label: Axiom
- Producer: Bill Laswell

Bill Laswell chronology
| Oscillations (1996) | Mysteries of Creation (1996) | Psychonavigation 3 (1997) |

Professional ratings
Review scores
| Source | Rating |
|---|---|
| AllMusic | 4.5/5 stars |
| Entertainment Weekly | B+ |

Mysteries of Creation is a musical compilation, released on October 22, 1996, by the Axiom record label.

== Track listing ==
Disc one
| No. | Title | Writer(s) | Artist | Length |
|---|---|---|---|---|
| 1. | "Maroon Rebellion" | DJ Ninj, Laswell | DJ Ninj/Bill Laswell | 5:55 |
| 2. | "Return to the Bass and Trouble" | Dunbar, Shakespeare | Sly and Robbie | 7:00 |
| 3. | "Revolution" | Mesinai, Ward | Sub Dub | 6:59 |
| 4. | "Cocksville U.S.A." | Burton, Hughes, Needs, Paterson, Phillips | The Orb | 10:32 |
| 5. | "Illbient" | Asch, Panciera, Platas | We feat. DJ Olive, Lloop and Once11 | 8:08 |
| 6. | "Ghost Light/Dread Recall" | Laswell | Material | 14:17 |
| 7. | "Dungeon of Dub" | Fernando | Wordsound I-Powa | 5:33 |

Disc two
| No. | Title | Writer(s) | Artist | Length |
|---|---|---|---|---|
| 1. | "Ariwa Dub Club" | Fraser | Mad Professor | 5:06 |
| 2. | "Beat One/Assyrian Dub" | Katz, Laswell, Wobble | Automaton | 11:22 |
| 3. | "Gun Too Hot" | McDonald, Scott, Sherwood | Dub Syndicate | 4:41 |
| 4. | "Nev 12" | Murray, Wobble | Jah Wobble with Jaki Liebezeit and Neville Murray | 6:08 |
| 5. | "Cyborg Dread" | Bennett, Broadrick, Martin | Techno Animal | 5:39 |
| 6. | "Black Falcon Dub" | Furlow, Harding, Laws | New Kingdom | 6:06 |
| 7. | "Fall of the Towers of Convention" | Fernando, Gari | Scarab | 7:39 |
| 8. | "Anansi Abstrakt" | Miller | DJ Spooky | 11:37 |

== Release history ==
| Region | Date | Label | Format | Catalog |
|---|---|---|---|---|
| United States | 1996 | Axiom | Compact disc (CD) | 162-531 070-2 |
