= Book of Exit: Dub Chamber 4 =

Studio album by Sacred System
- Released: October 29, 2002
- Recorded: Orange Music, West Orange, NJ
- Genre: Ambient dub
- Length: 48:24
- Label: ROIR
- Producer: Bill Laswell

Sacred System chronology
Nagual Site (1998)	Book of Exit: Dub Chamber 4 (2002)

Bill Laswell chronology
Psychonavigation 5 (2002)	Book of Exit: Dub Chamber 4 (2002)	Final Oscillations (2003)

Professional ratings
Review scores
Source	Rating
Allmusic	4/5 stars
Pitchfork Media	(6.8/10)
PopMatters	(positive)

Book of Exit: Dub Chamber 4 is the fourth album by American composer Bill Laswell issued under the moniker Sacred System. It was released on October 29, 2002 by ROIR.

== Track listing ==
No.	Title	Writer(s)	Length
1.	"Ethiopa"	Bill Laswell, Ejigayehu "Gigi" Shibabaw	6:14
2.	"The Lower Ground"	Bill Laswell	7:35
3.	"Shashamani"	Bill Laswell	7:30
4.	"Bati"	Bill Laswell, Ejigayehu "Gigi" Shibabaw	7:49
5.	"Land of Look Behind"	Bill Laswell	6:46
6.	"Jerusalem"	Bill Laswell, Ejigayehu "Gigi" Shibabaw	12:30

== Personnel ==
Adapted from the Book of Exit: Dub Chamber 4 liner notes.

Musicians

- Aïyb Dieng – percussion
- Karsh Kale – drums, tabla
- Bill Laswell – bass guitar, guitar, keyboards, musical arrangements, producer
- Ejigayehu "Gigi" Shibabaw – vocals

Technical personnel

- John Brown – cover art
- James Dellatacoma – assistant engineer
- Robert Musso – engineering, programming

== Release history ==
Region	Date	Label	Format	Catalog
United States	2002	ROIR	CD, LP	RUS 8280
