= Midtown 120 Blues =

Studio album by DJ Sprinkles
- Released: August 9, 2008
- Genre: Deep house
- Length: 79:46
- Label: Mule Musiq
- Producer: Terre Thaemlitz

Professional ratings
Review scores
Source	Rating
Allmusic	4/5 stars
Pitchfork Media	(8.5/10)
Resident Advisor	4.5/5 stars

Midtown 120 Blues is an album by Terre Thaemlitz, and the debut album under the name DJ Sprinkles. It was released under Mule Musiq on August 9, 2008. It was reissued in 2014 by Thaemlitz's Comatonse Recordings.

== Themes ==
Midtown 120 Blues is a treatise on deep house's origins and its erasure by mainstream culture. Track one, "Midtown 120 Intro", begins with a voiceover from Thaemlitz laying out these themes.

There must be a hundred records with voice-overs asking, "What is house?" The answer is always some greeting card bullshit about "life, love, happiness...." … House is not universal. House is hyper-specific … The contexts from which the deep house sound emerged are forgotten: sexual and gender crises, transgender sex work, black market hormones, drug and alcohol addiction, loneliness, racism, HIV, ACT UP, Tompkins Square Park, police brutality, queer-bashing, underpayment, unemployment and censorship — all at 120 beats per minute.

Track three, "Ball'r (Madonna Free Zone)," ends with a speech detailing Thaemlitz' frustration with the Madonna song "Vogue," which Thaemlitz felt erased the context of the vogue dance that emerged from the largely queer, black, and Latino-oriented Harlem ballroom scene.

When Madonna came out with her hit Vogue I knew it was over. She had taken a very specifically queer, transgender, Latino and African-American phenomenon and totally erased that context with her lyrics, "it makes no difference if you're black or white, if you're a boy or a girl." Madonna was taking in tons of money, while the Queen who actually taught her how to vogue sat before me in the club, strung out, depressed and broke. So if anybody requested Vogue or any other Madonna track, I told them, no, this is a Madonna-free zone! And as long as I'm DJing, you will not be allowed to vogue to the decontextualized, reified, corporatized, liberalized, neutralized, asexualized, re-genderized pop reflection of this dance floor's reality!

== Reception ==
Midtown 120 Blues is widely regarded as an exemplary contemporary deep house album. Resident Advisor, who named it their #1 album of 2009, called it "a classic in the deep house canon." Pitchfork Media's Andrew Gaerig gave the 2014 Comatonse reissue "Best New Reissue," saying that "at its best, Midtown 120 Blues simultaneously acts as a corrective to house's ahistorical narrative and reminds us just how potent and beautiful New York deep house can be."

== Track listing ==
No.	Title	Length
1.	"Midtown 120 Intro"	2:48
2.	"Midtown 120 Blues"	8:08
3.	"Ball'r (Madonna-Free Zone)"	8:20
4.	"Brenda's $20 Dilemma"	7:48
5.	"House Music Is Controllable Desire You Can Own"	7:11
6.	"Sister, I Don't Know What This World Is Coming To"	10:48
7.	"Reverse Rotation"	7:21
8.	"Grand Central – Part 1 (Deep Into the Bowel of House)"	12:10
9.	"Grand Central – Part 2 (72 Hrs. By Rail From Missouri)"	8:26
10.	"The Occasional Feel-Good"	6:40
Total length:		79:46
