= Jihad (Points of Order) =

Studio album by Automaton
- Released: August 12, 1994
- Studio: Greenpoint (Brooklyn)
- Genre: Ambient dub
- Length: 46:56
- Label: Strata
- Producer: Bill Laswell

Automaton chronology
Dub Terror Exhaust (1994)	Jihad (Points of Order) (1994)

Bill Laswell chronology
Visitation (1994)	Jihad (Points of Order) (1994)	Lost in the Translation (1994)

Jihad (Points of Order) is an album by American composer Bill Laswell, issued under the moniker Automaton. It was released on October 11, 1994, by Strata. Lisa Carr of the music journal Option favored Jihad over Automaton's previous release, saying it "deftly balances the cool, ambient sheen of Tetsu Inoue's electronics with the warm textures of Nicky Skopelitis' guitar and the unexpected pleasures of violinist Lili Haydn."

== Track listing ==
All music is composed by Bill Laswell.

No.	Title	Length
1.	"Port of Entry (The Future Is With Control)"	23:49
2.	"Intersection Point Between Empty Deserts and Written Deserts"	23:07

== Personnel ==
Adapted from the Jihad (Points of Order) liner notes.

Musicians

- Lili Haydn – violin
- Tetsu Inoue – electronics
- Bill Laswell – bass guitar, programming, producer
- Nicky Skopelitis – guitar, effects

Technical

- Layng Martine – assistant engineer
- Robert Musso – engineering, effects

== Release history ==
Region	Date	Label	Format	Catalog
United States	1994	Strata	CD	0005-2
