= The End of Law =

Studio album by Hashisheen
- Released: May 25, 1999
- Genre: Electronic, dub
- Length: 47:53
- Label: Sub Rosa
- Producer: Peter Becker, Janet Rienstra

Bill Laswell chronology
| Psychonavigation 4 (1999) | The End of Law (1999) | Charged (1999) |

Professional ratings
Review scores
| Source | Rating |
|---|---|
| Allmusic | 4.5/5 stars |

Hashisheen: The End of Law is an album by American composer Bill Laswell. It was released on May 25, 1999, by Sub Rosa.

The album features spoken-word recordings about Order of Assassins, also known as the Hashisheen, an Islamic sect founded by Hasan-i Sabbah, which are backed by Laswell's typical fusion of ambient music and groove-oriented dub reggae influences.

== Track listing ==
| No. | Title | Length |
|---|---|---|
| 1. | "First Reading" | 0:30 |
| 2. | "The Old Man of the Mountain" | 3:12 |
| 3. | "The Western Lands" | 6:12 |
| 4. | "The Spilled Cup" | 1:47 |
| 5. | "Marco Polo's Tale" | 1:43 |
| 6. | "Pilgrimage to Cairo" | 1:50 |
| 7. | "Freya Stark at Alamut" | 0:20 |
| 8. | "Castles" | 0:57 |
| 9. | "Hashish Poem" | 2:52 |
| 10. | "Sinan's Post" | 1:56 |
| 11. | "Assassinations" | 0:33 |
| 12. | "The Mongols Destroy Alamut" | 1:14 |
| 13. | "The Divine Self" | 5:09 |
| 14. | "Morning High" | 3:03 |
| 15. | "A Quick Trip to Alamut" | 3:41 |
| 16. | "Slogans" | 0:47 |
| 17. | "Book of the Highest Initiation" | 2:41 |
| 18. | "The Lord of the Resurrection" | 0:52 |
| 19. | "Assassinations" | 0:52 |
| 20. | "Tale of the Caliph Hakem" | 5:00 |
| 21. | "The Assassins" | 2:05 |
| 22. | "Last Reading" | 0:37 |

== Personnel ==
Adapted from the Hashisheen: The End of Law liner notes.

Spoken word artists

- Hakim Bey – spoken word (5, 6, 21)
- Nicole Blackman – spoken word (7, 9, 11, 19)
- William S. Burroughs – spoken word (3)
- Anne Clark – spoken word (20)
- Ira Cohen – spoken word (10)
- Lizzy Mercier Descloux – spoken word (14)
- Sussan Deyhim – spoken word (1, 4, 22)
- Umar Bin Hassan – spoken word (18)
- Percy Howard – spoken word (2, 8, 12)
- Genesis P-Orridge – spoken word (2, 16, 17, 20)
- Iggy Pop – spoken word (3, 15)
- Patti Smith – spoken word (14)
- Jah Wobble – bass guitar, keyboards and spoken word (13)

Musicians

- Helios Creed – guitar and effects (16, 17)
- Anton Fier – drums (7, 8, 11, 19)
- Bill Laswell – bass guitar and effects (16, 17), musical arrangements
- Jaki Liebezeit – drums (13)
- Neville Murray – bendir and congas (13)
- Oliver Ray – guitar (14)
- Paul Schütze – instruments (12, 15)
- Nicky Skopelitis – guitar (5, 14)
- Techno Animal – instruments (3)

Technical

- Peter Becker – producer, engineering
- Mark Ferda – engineering, mixing
- Janet Rienstra – producer, musical arrangements
- Hugo Scholten – engineering

== Release history ==
| Region | Date | Label | Format | Catalog |
|---|---|---|---|---|
| United States | 1999 | Sub Rosa | CD | SR154 |
