= Russian Chants «Parastas» =

Remix album by Boris Feoktistov/Bill Laswell
- Released: 1995
- Recorded: Greenpoint Studios, Brooklyn, NY
- Genre: Ambient
- Length: 49:53
- Label: Meldac
- Producer: Hisao Hirata

Bill Laswell chronology
Psychonavigation 2 (1995)	Russian Chants «Parastas» (1995)	Off World One (1996)

Russian Chants «Parastas» is an album by Russian composer Boris Feoktistov and American composer Bill Laswell. It was released in 1995 by Meldac. The album comprises ambient soundscapes created by Laswell structured around Russian orthodox liturgical chants authored by Boris Feoktistov.

== Track listing ==
All music is composed by Boris Feoktistov and Bill Laswell.

No.	Title	Length
1.	"Cold Chamber" (The Great Litany/Alleluia, Tone 8 Troparion, The 1st, The 2nd/The Beginning: "Bless Be, O Lord", Troparion: "Give Repose, O Lord"/The Small Litany/"Repose, Our Saviour")	16:42
2.	"Four Sided Vortex" ("Repose, Our Saviour"/"The Only Immortal"/The Small Litany)	16:27
3.	"Relative Motion" ("I Cry And Sob"/"With the Spirits of the Just"/The Insistent Litany)	16:43

== Personnel ==
Adapted from the Russian Chants «Parastas» liner notes.

Musicians

- Bill Laswell – bass guitar, drum programming, effects, mixing

Technical personnel

- Hisao Hirata – producer
- Akira Kitajima – cover art
- Layng Martine – assistant engineer
- Robert Musso – engineering, guitar
- Masayo Takise – mastering

== Release history ==
Region	Date	Label	Format	Catalog
Japan	1995	Meldac	CD	MECI 26001
Germany	1996	99	CD	LC 6383 2150
