= Sacrifice (Divination album) =

Studio album by Divination
- Released: October 13, 1998
- Studio: Orange Music (West Orange, N.J.)
- Genre: Ambient
- Length: 48:04
- Label: Meta
- Producer: Bill Laswell

Divination chronology
Distill (1996)	Sacrifice (1998)

Bill Laswell chronology
Nagual Site (1998)	Sacrifice (1998)	Invisible Design (1999)

Professional ratings
Review scores
Source	Rating
Allmusic	2.5/5 stars

Sacrifice is the fifth album by American composer Bill Laswell to be issued under the moniker Divination. It was released on October 13, 1998, by Meta Records.

== Track listing ==
No.	Title	Writer(s)	Length
1.	"Reflection"	Laraaji, Bill Laswell	16:13
2.	"Waterbass"	Bill Laswell	8:54
3.	"Still"	Laraaji, Bill Laswell	16:09
4.	"Airbass"	Bill Laswell	6:48

== Personnel ==
Adapted from the Sacrifice liner notes.

- Laraaji – electric zither
- Bill Laswell – bass guitar, effects, producer
- Brijbass – cover art
- Michael Fossenkemper – mastering
- Robert Musso – engineering

== Release history ==
Region	Date	Label	Format	Catalog
United States	1998	Meta	CD	MT-002
