= Fiesta Songs =

Studio album by Señor Coconut
- Released: July 29, 2003
- Genre: Latin Dance, Electronic
- Label: Emperor Norton
- Producer: Atom Heart

Señor Coconut chronology
| El Baile Alemán (2000) | Fiesta Songs (2003) | Yellow Fever! (2006) |

Professional ratings
Review scores
| Source | Rating |
|---|---|
| Allmusic | link |
| Rolling Stone | (RS 929, August 21, 2003) |

Fiesta Songs is a 2003 album by Señor Coconut Y Su Conjunto (Uwe Schmidt). It is an album of covers done in a Latin American style. Like its predecessor, it is a tribute album, and includes covers of Deep Purple, The Doors, Michael Jackson, Sade, and Jean Michel Jarre.

== Track listing ==
1. "Smoke on the Water" [Cha-Cha-Cha] – 4:49
2. "Negra Mi Cha Cha Cha" [Cha-Cha-Cha] – 3:22
3. "Riders on the Storm" [Merengue] – 5:05
4. "Smooth Operator" [Mambo Cha-Cha-Cha] – 4:04
5. "El Rey de las Galletas" [Guaguanco] – 3:27
6. "Oxygène, Pt. 2" [Mambo Cha-Cha-Cha] – 3:36
7. "Blue Eyes" [Bolero] – 3:57
8. "Las Marcas de Machin" [Cha-Cha-Cha] – 3:02
9. "Beat It" [Merengue] – 3:55
10. "Electrolatino" [Mambo Cha-Cha-Cha] – 4:06
11. untitled [Humo en el Agua (Spanish version of "Smoke on the Water")] – 4:46

== Personnel ==
- Lars Vissing - Trumpet, Flugelhorn
- Cecilia Aguayo - Voices
- August Engkilde - Bass (Upright), Horn Arrangements, Score
- Thomas Hass - Sax (Baritone), Sax (Tenor)
- Argenis Brito - Percussion, Vocals
- Linger Decoree - Sampling, Design, Typography
- Morten Gronvad - Percussion, Vibraphone
- Peter Kibsgaard - Percussion
- Klaus Löhr - Trombone, Trombone (Bass)
- Carsten Skov - Marimba
