= Dub Meltdown =

Studio album by Bill Laswell and Style Scott
- Released: August 12, 1997
- Studio: Greenpoint (Brooklyn)
- Genre: Ambient
- Length: 59:57
- Label: WordSound
- Producer: Bill Laswell

Bill Laswell chronology
City of Light (1997)	Dub Meltdown (1997)	Chapter Two (1997)

Professional ratings
Review scores
Source	Rating
Allmusic	2.5/5 stars

Dub Meltdown is a collaborative album by Bill Laswell and Style Scott, released on August 12, 1997, by WordSound.

== Track listing ==
All music is composed by Bill Laswell and Style Scott.

No.	Title	Length
1.	"Crooklyn Dub Syndicate"	8:05
2.	"Fourth Column"	8:15
3.	"Aeon"	8:09
4.	"Emergency at the Plant"	4:46
5.	"Radioactive Dub"	7:36
6.	"Fallout"	7:58
7.	"A Greater Source of Power"	7:45
8.	"Melting Pot"	7:23

== Personnel ==
Adapted from the Dub Meltdown liner notes.

Musicians

- Capt. Kowatchi – percussion
- The Eye – effects, mixing (1, 4, 5, 7, 8)
- Bill Laswell – bass guitar, loops, effects, producer, mixing (2, 6)
- Style Scott – drums
- Professor Shehab – sampler, mixing (3)

Technical personnel

- Robert Musso – engineering

== Release history ==
Region	Date	Label	Format	Catalog
United States	1997	WordSound	CD, LP	WS021
