= Emerald Aether: Shape Shifting =

Remix album by Bill Laswell
- Released: March 14, 2000
- Recorded: Orange Music, West Orange, NJ
- Genre: Downtempo
- Length: 49:30
- Label: Shanachie
- Producer: Bill Laswell

Bill Laswell chronology
| Outland IV (2000) | Emerald Aether: Shape Shifting (2000) | Dub Chamber 3 (2000) |

Professional ratings
Review scores
| Source | Rating |
|---|---|
| Allmusic | 2.5/5 stars |

Emerald Aether: Shape Shifting is a remix album by American composer Bill Laswell, released on March 14, 2000 by Shanachie Records.

== Track listing ==
| No. | Title | Artist | Length |
|---|---|---|---|
| 1. | "The Wayfaring Stranger" | Jerry O'Sullivan | 2:49 |
| 2. | "The Stride Set" | Solas | 6:45 |
| 3. | "The Lavouring Man's Daughter" | Karan Casey | 5:07 |
| 4. | "We Dreamed Our Dreams" | Cathie Ryan | 0:48 |
| 5. | "Wendel's Wedding" | Jerry O'Sullivan | 3:15 |
| 6. | "The Gray Selchie" | Solas | 2:12 |
| 7. | "Dark Green" | Bill Laswell | 3:59 |
| 8. | "Wind Chimes and Nursery Rhymes" | Jerry O'Sullivan | 2:49 |
| 9. | "One, I Love" | Karan Casey | 4:44 |
| 10. | "La Bruxa" | Solas | 4:34 |
| 11. | "The Hare in the Heather" | Matt Molloy | 2:32 |
| 12. | "Coaineadh Na Dtri Muire (Lament of the Three Marys)" | Cathie Ryan | 3:37 |
| 13. | "Slieve Russell, Jimmy Wards J.G." | Matt Molloy | 2:00 |
| 14. | "The Beauty Spot" | Solas | 4:19 |

== Personnel ==
Adapted from the Emerald Aether: Shape Shifting liner notes.

- Michael Fossenkemper – mastering
- James Koehnline – cover art
- Bill Laswell – producer, mixing
- Robert Musso – engineering

== Release history ==
| Region | Date | Label | Format | Catalog |
|---|---|---|---|---|
| United States | 2000 | Shanachie | CD | SHA 78035 |
