= Visitation (Jonah Sharp and Bill Laswell album) =

Studio album by Jonah Sharp/Bill Laswell
- Released: August 12, 1994
- Studio: Greenpoint (Brooklyn)
- Genre: Ambient dub
- Length: 62:09
- Label: Subharmonic
- Producer: Bill Laswell, Jonah Sharp

Bill Laswell chronology
Dub Terror Exhaust (1994)	Visitation (1994)	Jihad (Points of Order) (1994)

Professional ratings
Review scores
Source	Rating
Allmusic	2.5/5 stars

Visitation is a collaborative album by Bill Laswell and Jonah Sharp. It was released on August 12, 1994, by Subharmonic.

== Track listing ==
No.	Title	Writer(s)	Length
1.	"Zurvan Akara"	Bill Laswell, Jonah Sharp	31:54
2.	"Aion"	Bill Laswell	30:15

== Personnel ==
Adapted from the Visitation liner notes.

Musicians

- Bill Laswell – musical arrangements, producer, photography
- Jonah Sharp – musical arrangements, producer

Technical

- Layng Martine – assistant engineer
- Robert Musso – engineering, programming
- Aldo Sampieri – design

== Release history ==
Region	Date	Label	Format	Catalog
United States	1994	Subharmonic	CD	SD 7006-2
