= Boris Feoktistov =

Russian classical composer

Boris Feoktistov is a composer and conductor of Russian Orthodox liturgical chants. He has written musical compositions for piano, vocalists, for orchestra and has scored films. He began his musical studies at a young age, learning the violin while in school. He later attended a school for music, but was drafted into the army and did not graduate. In the 1970s, he was blessed by Philaret (Vakhromeyev), becoming a precentor at Trinity Lavra of St. Sergius. In 1993, Feoktistov was invited to an exhibition to conduct a choir in dedication of the 75th anniversary of the murder of the Imperial family. In 1995, American composer Bill Laswell remixed Feoktistov's Parastas, adding ambient music soundscapes, and released the tracks on Russian Chants «Parastas».

== Discography ==
- Parastas: Great Funeral Service, Op. 40 (1994)
- Russian Chants «Parastas» (1995)
