= Psychonavigation =

Studio album by Pete Namlook & Bill Laswell
- Released: April 25, 1994
- Recorded: Greenpoint (Brooklyn, N.Y.)
- Genre: Ambient, ambient dub, electronic
- Length: 70:19
- Label: FAX +49-69/450464

Bill Laswell chronology
Outland (1994)	Psychonavigation (1994)	Doom Ride (1994)

Professional ratings
Review scores
Source	Rating
Allmusic	4.5/5 stars

Psychonavigation is a collaborative album by Bill Laswell and Pete Namlook, released on April 25, 1994, by FAX +49-69/450464.

== Track listing ==
All music is composed by Bill Laswell and Pete Namlook.

No.	Title	Length
1.	"Psychic and U.F.O. Revelations in the Last Days"	38:46
2.	"Angel Tech"	10:17
3.	"Black Dawn"	21:16

== Personnel ==
Adapted from the Psychonavigation liner notes.

Musicians

- Bill Laswell – bass guitar, electronics, musical arrangements
- Pete Namlook – electronics, musical arrangements

Technical personnel

- Thi-Linh Le – cover art
- Robert Musso – engineering

== Release history ==
Region	Date	Label	Format	Catalog
Germany	1994	FAX +49-69/450464	CD	PW 13
United States	1994	Subharmonic	CD	SD 7005-2
