= El Baile Alemán =

Studio album by Señor Coconut y Su Conjunto
- Released: July 4, 2000
- Recorded: December 1999 at Mira, Musica!, Santiago de Chile
- Genre: Latin dance, electronic
- Label: Emperor Norton
- Producer: Atom Heart

Señor Coconut y Su Conjunto chronology
El Gran Baile (1997)	El Baile Alemán (2000)	Fiesta Songs (2003)

Professional ratings
Review scores
Source	Rating
AllMusic	link
The Guardian	link
The Metro Times	link
Pitchfork	(6.0/10)link

El Baile Alemán ("The German Dance" in Spanish) is a cover album by Señor Coconut y Su Conjunto, it consists of Kraftwerk covers done in a Latin American style.

Although mostly note-for-note covers, some tracks add embellishments such as "cha-cha-chas", or minor changes to the song, like incorporating Latin Radio into the radio transmission in "Autobahn". The song "Home Computer" also has some lyrics from "It's More Fun to Compute" from the album Computer World.

"Tour de France" was released as a remixed single. The single release also includes vocal and instrumental cover versions of "Expo 2000", which are not included on the album.

Early copies of the album opened with "Showroom Dummies" and included a cover of "Radioactivity" as the second track. At the request of the original songwriters, "Radioactivity" was taken off the album. All subsequent issues of the album were resequenced, placing "Showroom Dummies" as the second track and inserting a spoken track "Introducción" at the start of the album.

== Track listing ==
Adapted from CD liner notes.

No.	Title	Writer(s)	Length
1.	"Introducción"	Señor Coconut Y Su Conjunto	1:15
2.	"Showroom Dummies (Cha-Cha-Cha)"	Ralf Hütter	5:26
3.	"Trans-Europe Express (Cumbia)"	Hütter, Emil Schult	5:55
4.	"The Robots (Cha-Cha-Cha)"	Karl Bartos, Hütter, Florian Schneider	5:07
5.	"Neon Lights (Cha-Cha-Cha)"	Bartos, Hütter, Schneider	4:52
6.	"Autobahn (Cumbia Merengue)"	Hütter, Schneider, Schult	6:32
7.	"Homecomputer (Merengue)"	Bartos, Hütter, Schneider	3:50
8.	"Tour de France (Merengue)"	Bartos, Hütter, Maxime Schmitt, Schneider	4:31
9.	"The Man-Machine (Baklàn)"	Bartos, Hütter, Schneider	4:26
10.	"Music Non Stop (Cumbia)"	Bartos, Hütter, Schneider, Schult	4:48
Total length:			46:42

2007 Japan CD bonus tracks
No.	Title	Writer(s)	Length
11.	"Electrolatino (Main Mix)"	Atom Heart	4:09
12.	"Expo 2000 (Mambo)"	Fritz Hilpert, Hütter, Schneider	3:56
13.	"Tour De France (Radio Edit)"	Bartos, Hütter, Schmitt, Schneider	3:46
14.	"Expo 2000 (Mambo Instrumental)"	Hilpert, Hütter, Schneider	3:24
15.	"Electrolatino (Short Mix)"	Atom Heart	2:49
Total length:			1:04:46

== Singles ==
Tour de France (Multicolor Recordings / EFA | EFA 56007-6 / MCR 107.3):
Tour de France (Radio Edit & Album Version)/ EXPO2000/ EXPO2000 (Instrumental)

Tour de France / Showroom Dummies (Multicolor Recordings / New State Recordings | NSERCD001):
Tour de France (Radio Edit & "Good Grooves' 501 Vocal Mix" & Video)/ Showroom Dummies (Radio Edit)

== Personnel ==
- Jorge González – vocals
- Lisa Carbon – background vocals
- Atom Heart – keyboards, producer
- Argenis Brito – vocals
- Ricardito Tambo – shaker, MIDI
