= Rhythmagick =

Studio album by Aïyb Dieng
- Released: 1995
- Recorded: Greenpoint Studios, Brooklyn, NY
- Genre: Afro-jazz
- Length: 50:12
- Label: P-Vine
- Producer: Aïyb Dieng, Bill Laswell

Aïyb Dieng chronology
Rythmes Africains (1978)	Rhythmagick (1995)

Professional ratings
Review scores
Source	Rating
Allmusic	1.5/5 stars

Rhythmagick is the debut solo album by percussionist Aïyb Dieng, it was released in 1995 by P-Vine Records.

== Track listing ==
No.	Title	Writer(s)	Length
1.	"Rhythmagick"	Aïyb Dieng, Umar Bin Hassan, Pharoah Sanders	4:04
2.	"Sabar"	Aïyb Dieng, Bill Laswell	6:12
3.	"Takou"	Aïyb Dieng, Trilok Gurtu	3:53
4.	"Darésalam"	Aïyb Dieng, Pharoah Sanders	6:25
5.	"Bôka Devotion"	Aïyb Dieng, Bill Laswell	6:10
6.	"Soweto Funk"	Aïyb Dieng, Bill Laswell	9:12
7.	"Touba"	Aïyb Dieng, Trilok Gurtu	7:40
8.	"Dungal Dub"	Aïyb Dieng, Bill Laswell	6:36

== Personnel ==
Musicians

- Bootsy Collins – bass guitar, guitar
- Carlos Cordova – batá
- Aïyb Dieng – bass drum, batá, chatan, congas, talking drum, producer
- Trilok Gurtu – drums, tabla
- Umar Bin Hassan – voice
- Bill Laswell – bass guitar, sampler, producer
- Daniel Ponce – batá, congas
- Pharoah Sanders – tenor saxophone, flute
- Nicky Skopelitis – six-string guitar, twelve-string guitar
- Bernie Worrell – Hammond organ, clavinet

Technical personnel

- Mati Klarwein – cover art
- Thi-Linh Le – photography
- Layng Martine – assistant engineer
- Robert Musso – engineering
- Aldo Sampieri – design

== Release history ==
Region	Date	Label	Format	Catalog
Japan	1995	P-Vine	CD	PCD-5801
United States	1997	Subharmonic	CD	SD-7021-2
Germany	1999	Masterplan	CD	MP 42006
