= Akasha (album) =

Studio album by Divination
- Released: March 28, 1995
- Studio: Greenpoint Studio, Brooklyn, NY
- Genre: Dark ambient
- Length: 88:20
- Label: Subharmonic
- Producer: Anton Fier, Mick Harris, Bill Laswell

Divination chronology
Light in Extension (1994)	Akasha (1995)	Distill (1996)

Bill Laswell chronology
Somnific Flux (1995)	Akasha (1995)	Subsonic 2: Bass Terror (1995)

Professional ratings
Review scores
Source	Rating
Allmusic	3/5 stars

Akasha is the third album by American composer Bill Laswell to be issued under the moniker Divination. It was released on March 28, 1995, by Subharmonic.

== Track listing ==
Disc one (Ambient)
No.	Title	Writer(s)	Artist	Length
1.	"Descent"	Laswell	Bill Laswell	14:55
2.	"Rain Dream"	Hosono	Haruomi Hosono	5:49
3.	"Ascesis"	Fier	Anton Fier with Lydia Kavanaugh	10:06
4.	"Stir"	Harris	Mick Harris	11:17

Disc two (Rhythm)
No.	Title	Writer(s)	Artist	Length
1.	"Tangier Space Draft"	Laswell	Bill Laswell with DXT	15:21
2.	"Navigations"	Hosono, Shimizu	Haruomi Hosono and Yasuaki Shimizu	14:41
3.	"Illuminoid Assassin"	Laswell	Bill Laswell with DXT	16:11

== Personnel ==
Adapted from the Akasha liner notes.

Musicians

- Anton Fier – effects and producer (1.3)
- Grand Mixer DXT – turntables (2.1, 2.3)
- Mick Harris – effects and producer(1.4)
- Haruomi Hosono – drum programming and effects (1.2, 2.2)
- Lydia Kavanaugh – vocals (1.3)
- Bill Laswell – bass, effects, drum programming, producer and mixing (1.1, 1.2, 2.1–2.3), editing

Technical

- Layng Martine – assistant engineer and editing (1.1, 1.2, 2.1–2.3)
- Magno – cover art
- Robert Musso – engineering and programming (1.1, 1.2, 2.1–2.3)

== Release history ==
Region	Date	Label	Format	Catalog
United States	1995	Subharmonic	CD	SD 7011-2
