= Somnific Flux =

Studio album by M.J. Harris & Bill Laswell
- Released: March 7, 1995
- Recorded: November 1994; December 1994
- Studio: Wall of Silence (Birmingham, England); Greenpoint (Brooklyn)
- Genre: Dark ambient
- Length: 65:55
- Label: Subharmonic
- Producer: Mick Harris, Bill Laswell

Bill Laswell chronology
| Web (1995) | Somnific Flux (1995) | Akasha (1995) |

Professional ratings
Review scores
| Source | Rating |
|---|---|
| Allmusic | 3/5 stars |

Somnific Flux is a collaborative album by Mick Harris and Bill Laswell, released on March 7, 1995, by Subharmonic.

== Track listing ==
All music is composed by Mick Harris and Bill Laswell.

| No. | Title | Length |
|---|---|---|
| 1. | "Distal Sonority" | 35:10 |
| 2. | "Capacious" | 30:45 |

== Personnel ==
Adapted from the Somnific Flux liner notes.

Musicians

- Mick Harris – effects, recording, photography
- Bill Laswell – effects, recording, mixing

Technical

- Layng Martine – assistant engineer
- Robert Musso – engineering

== Release history ==
| Region | Date | Label | Format | Catalog |
|---|---|---|---|---|
| United States | 1995 | Subharmonic | CD | SD 7012-2 |
| United Kingdom | 1995 | Sentrax | CD | SNTX 2080 |
