= Chapter One: Book of Entrance =

Studio album by Sacred System
- Released: May 14, 1996
- Recorded: Greenpoint (Brooklyn)
- Genre: Ambient dub
- Length: 46:40
- Label: ROIR
- Producer: Bill Laswell

Sacred System chronology
Chapter One: Book of Entrance (1996)	Chapter Two (1997)

Bill Laswell chronology
Outland 2 (1996)	Chapter One: Book of Entrance (1996)	Ambient Compendium (1996)

Professional ratings
Review scores
Source	Rating
Allmusic	3/5 stars

Chapter One: Book of Entrance is the first album by American composer Bill Laswell issued under the moniker Sacred System. It was released on May 14, 1996, by ROIR.

== Track listing ==
All music is composed by Bill Laswell.

No.	Title	Length
1.	"Babylon Ghost"	6:00
2.	"Dread Internal"	9:19
3.	"Cyborg Assault"	5:37
4.	"Galactic Zone"	9:31
5.	"Sub Terrain"	16:13

== Personnel ==
Adapted from the Chapter One: Book of Entrance liner notes.

produced and arranged by Bill Laswell

Musicians

- Bill Laswell – bass guitar, drum programming, keyboards, musical arrangements, producer

Technical personnel

- Anton Fier – technician
- Robert Musso – engineering, programming
- Sneak Attack – cover art

mastered by Michael Fossenkemper at Turtle Tone Studio, NYC

== Release history ==
Region	Date	Label	Format	Catalog
United States	1996	ROIR	CD	RUSCD 8225
United States	2004	ROIR	LP	RUSLP 8225
