= Oscillations (album) =

Studio album by Bill Laswell
- Released: September 16, 1996
- Recorded: Greenpoint Studios, Brooklyn, NY
- Genre: Drum and bass
- Length: 45:51
- Label: Sub Rosa
- Producer: Bill Laswell

Bill Laswell chronology
Ambient Compendium (1996)	Oscillations (1996)	Mysteries of Creation (1996)

Professional ratings
Review scores
Source	Rating
Allmusic	4/5 stars

Oscillations is the fifth studio album by the jazz artist Bill Laswell. It was released in 1996 through Sub Rosa.

== Track listing ==
No.	Title	Writer(s)	Length
1.	"Digitaria"	DJ Ninj, Bill Laswell	6:21
2.	"Faktura"	Bill Laswell	6:11
3.	"Dislocation"	Bill Laswell	8:00
4.	"Extinguisher"	Robert Musso	7:49
5.	"Third Stage Navigator"	Bill Laswell	9:00
6.	"Wird"	Bill Laswell	8:30

== Personnel ==
Adapted from the Oscillations liner notes.

Musicians

- DJ Ninj – drum programming and effects (1)
- Bill Laswell – bass guitar, drum programming, effects, producer

Technical personnel

- Ira Cohen – photography
- Robert Musso – engineering, guitar (4), effects (4), producer (4)

== Release history ==
Region	Date	Label	Format	Catalog
Belgium	1996	Sub Rosa	CD, LP	SR109
