= Dub Terror Exhaust =

Studio album by Automaton
- Released: August 12, 1994
- Studio: Greenpoint (Brooklyn)
- Genre: Ambient dub
- Length: 46:54
- Label: Strata
- Producer: Bill Laswell

Automaton chronology
Dub Terror Exhaust (1994)	Jihad (Points of Order) (1994)

Bill Laswell chronology
Cymatic Scan (1994)	Dub Terror Exhaust (1994)	Visitation (1994)

Professional ratings
Review scores
Source	Rating
AllMusic	4.5/5 stars

Dub Terror Exhaust is an album by American composer Bill Laswell, issued under the moniker Automaton. It was released on August 12, 1994, by Strata.

== Track listing ==
No.	Title	Writer(s)	Length
1.	"Astral Altar (The Gateway of Legba)"	Bill Laswell	11:46
2.	"Asiyah Dub (Blinding the Starry Eyes of God)"	Gabriel Katz, Bill Laswell	11:12
3.	"The Terran Invasion of Alpha Centauri Year 2794"	DJ Spooky	11:44
4.	"The Black Meat (Deconstruction of the Bebel-Tower of Reason)"	Gabriel Katz, Bill Laswell	12:12

== Personnel ==
Adapted from the Dub Terror Exhaust liner notes.

Musicians

- DJ Spooky – turntables
- Sly Dunbar – drums, percussion
- Gabriel Katz – bass guitar, effects
- Bill Laswell – bass guitar, effects, producer

Technical

- Layng Martine – assistant engineer
- Robert Musso – engineering, programming

== Release history ==
Region	Date	Label	Format	Catalog
United States	1994	Strata	CD	0004-2
