= Dub Chamber 3 =

Studio album by Bill Laswell
- Released: April 25, 2000
- Recorded: Orange Music, West Orange, NJ
- Genre: Ambient dub
- Length: 48:02
- Label: ROIR
- Producer: Bill Laswell

Bill Laswell chronology
Emerald Aether: Shape Shifting (2000)	Dub Chamber 3 (2000)	The Redesign (2000)

Professional ratings
Review scores
Source	Rating
AllMusic	4/5 stars
The Encyclopedia of Popular Music	3/5 stars
Q	3/5 stars

Dub Chamber 3 is the eleventh solo album by American composer Bill Laswell, released on April 25, 2000, by ROIR.

== Track listing ==
No.	Title	Writer(s)	Length
1.	"Beyond the Zero"	Bill Laswell, Nils Petter Molvær	9:09
2.	"Cybotron"	Bill Laswell, Jah Wobble	9:26
3.	"Devil Syndrome"	Bill Laswell, Nils Petter Molvær	11:53
4.	"A Screaming Comes Across the Sky"	Bill Laswell, Nicky Skopelitis	17:34

== Personnel ==
Adapted from the Dub Chamber 3 liner notes.

Musicians

- Karsh Kale – tabla and drums (1)
- Bill Laswell – bass guitar, keyboards, drum programming, producer
- Nils Petter Molvær – trumpet and effects (3)
- Nicky Skopelitis – six-string guitar, twelve-string guitar, drum programming, effects
- Craig Taborn – electric piano (1, 3, 4)
- Jah Wobble – bass guitar (4)

Technical personnel

- John Brown – photography, design
- Michael Fossenkemper – mastering
- Robert Musso – engineering

== Release history ==
Region	Date	Label	Format	Catalog
United States	2000	ROIR	CD, LP	RUS 8263
