= Uwe Schmidt =

German composer, musician and producer

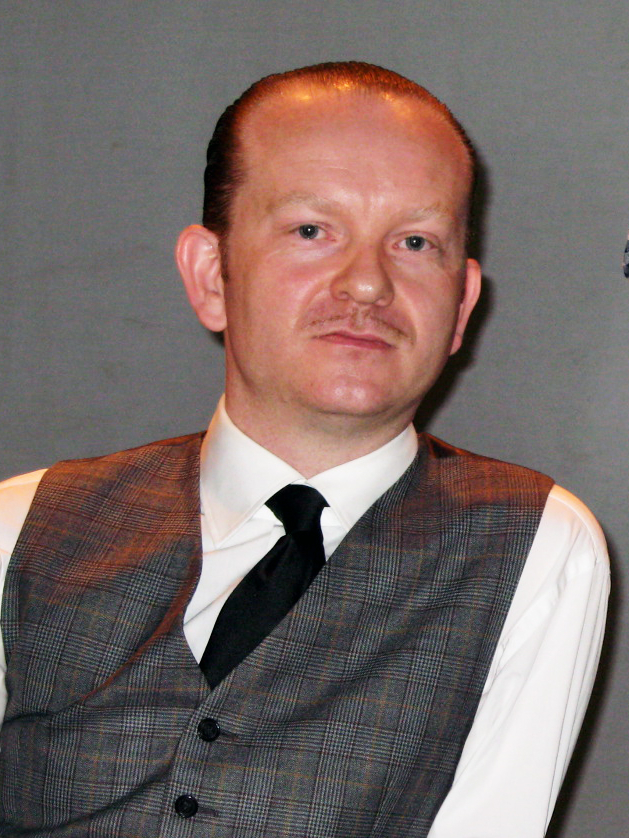
- Schmidt at MUTEK10, Montreal in 2009

Background information
- Also known as: Atom™, Atom Heart, Señor Coconut, Lassigue Bendthaus
- Born: Uwe H. Schmidt; 27 August 1968 (age 58); Frankfurt am Main, West Germany
- Genres: Electronic music, postmodern music, glitch, IDM, Latin dance, techno, experimental, easy listening
- Occupations: Composer, programmer, musician, producer, graphic designer
- Years active: 1990–present
- Labels: Rather Interesting; Raster-Noton; Nacional Records; Fax Label; Contempo
- Website: www.atom-tm.com www.senor-coconut.com

Uwe H. Schmidt (born 27 August 1968), also known as Atom™, Atom Heart, or Señor Coconut, is a German composer, musician and producer of electronic music. He was active in the development of electrolatino, electrogospel, and aciton music. In the 1990’s, Schmidt moved to Chile and developed part of his career there, adopting the alias Señor Coconut.

== Biography ==
=== 1983–1990 ===
Uwe Schmidt was born in Frankfurt. He began making music in the early 1980s, first playing drums, then switching to programming a drum computer after he had heard a Linn Drum on the radio. In 1986, he co-founded the cassette label N.G. Medien, on which various tapes were released, featuring international artists such as Canadian electronic body music act Front Line Assembly, as well as his own first musical work as Lassigue Bendthaus, entitled The Engineer's Love.

Soon after, he started to work on what would become his first official Lassigue Bendthaus record release, the album Matter. The recordings and production for Matter began in 1986 and took almost four years, until the album finally came out in 1991 on the German Parade Amoureuse label. Matter as well as its related singles and maxi-singles were recorded and mixed by Tobias Freund (Pink Elln). That same year, he released his debut dancefloor track, 'Whitehouse'. More releases followed on labels like Cyclotron, Rising High, and Pod Communications, for which (as Atom Heart) he co-created with Ata and Heiko the 12" vinyl Mihon.

Lassigue Bendthaus, until that point, was musically categorized as EBM, even though part of the success of Matter may have been the fact that it did not quite fit the category and already incorporated musical elements of the 1990s. Uwe Schmidt played his first live show as Lassigue Bendthaus as the opening act for the British group Meat Beat Manifesto at the Frankfurt Batschkapp in 1989.

=== 1991–1994 ===
Still living in Frankfurt, Uwe Schmidt was directly influenced by the emerging "pre-techno" movement of the late 1980s known as house and acid house. A sub-label of Parade Amoureuse released some of Schmidt's dance floor oriented productions under the alias Atom Heart which he adopted as his main artist name from then on. The early 1990s saw a series of 12-inch vinyl productions, mainly aimed at the dance floor, which were released under a variety of different project titles such as Atom Heart, Slot, etc.

In 1992, he was in charge of producing a series of tracks for the yet to be widely known DJs Pascal F.E.O.S. (Resistance D), Ata and Heiko M/S/O (Ongaku). Uwe Schmidt produced and co-wrote titles such as "Ongaku" and "Cosmic Love", which became successful prototypes for the appearing trance movement. His activities as a music producer continued with the Austrian multimedia artists Station Rose whom had just moved from Vienna to Frankfurt in 1992. The 12-inch "Digit Eyes" was produced by Schmidt and Station Rose the same year. During the production of "Digit Eyes" he was introduced to Tetsu Inoue, a New York-based Japanese electronic music producer, with whom he founded the Datacide project in 1993.

Out of the N.G. Medien nucleus the record label POD Communication was founded in 1992. After the bankruptcy of Parade Amoureuse and its sub-labels in 1992, Schmidt moved his activities to POD Communication on which he released a series of 12-inches and albums under the guises of Atom Heart, Lisa Carbon and Atomu Shinzo. Also releasing on POD Communication was the German artist Pete Namlook whom Uwe Schmidt first met at the POD office in Frankfurt. Due to his releases on Parade Amoureuse and POD Communication and his successful production works, Schmidt had quickly obtained a reputation that let him play live concerts all around the world. Together with Tobias Freund, who by then used the Pink Elln pseudonym, Schmidt played a live show at one of the first rave parties ever in Finland in 1992. The live concert was recorded and released on Ongaku Music in 1992, known as "Elektronikkaa – Atom Heart & Pink Elln live in Montreux and Helsinki".

A vast amount of productions were released worldwide due to the licensing activities of POD Communication, Ongaku Music and a variety of other Frankfurt-based record companies. After Parade Amoureuse closed down in 1992, his first album Matter was re-released by the Italian record label Contempo Records from Florence.

In 1993, Schmidt released the follow-up album to Matter: Lassigue Bendthaus' Cloned. Cloned was produced and licensed to Contempo Records together with a sample CD titled Cloned:Binary which contained the sounds used on the original album. Contempo Records went bankrupt in 1993.

Due to open payments by those labels, lack of a recording studio and unresolved recording contracts, Schmidt decided to take some months off and lived for half a year in Costa Rica (end of 1992 until early 1993). On the way back from Costa Rica, he stopped over in New York City, where he visited Tetsu Inoue to record the first Datacide album. Back home in Frankfurt, his interest in Latin Music started to grow and in fact the birth of the Señor Coconut moniker can be located somewhere around that time. Even though Lassigue Bendthaus had not brought him much luck until then, he decided to start recording his third album during 1993 entitled Render. Because of the stagnation and inherent ignorance of the techno movement that surrounded Schmidt's work, he soon began to distance from this musical format and scene. He also felt that the DJ and the dance floor were limiting targets for his musical output and that many of his musical ideas would not be compatible with it. As a consequence he founded his own record label Rather Interesting in 1994.

By this time, Pete Namlook had founded his FAX +49-69/450464 label and a new scene of musical styles appeared, such as ambient, jungle, IDM and others. Schmidt collaborated with Namlook under the names Millenium (for Pod) and as Subsequence (for FAX).

Uwe Schmidt, apart from his monthly release on Rather Interesting, continued recording with Tetsu Inoue (Datacide), Pete Namlook (Jet Chamber) and Victor Sol (+N) during 1994. That same year, the Lassigue Bendthaus albums Render, Render Audible (U.S. Remixes), Matter (second re-release), Cloned (first re-release) and the 12-inch "Overflow" were released by the Belgian KK Records, a label that would officially declare bankruptcy in 2000. Right after the release and re-release of the Lassigue Bendthaus albums, Schmidt began to work on the last album to be released under that project name called Pop Artificielle.

=== 1995–1998 ===
In 1995, Uwe Schmidt collaborated with Bill Laswell and Tetsu Inoue on the Fax release Second Nature, which was recorded at Laswell's studio in Brooklyn. Toward the end of 1995, another collaboration was concretized in Tokyo where Schmidt, Inoue, and Yellow Magic Orchestra founder Haruomi Hosono recorded the first HAT album, which was released on Schmidt's Rather Interesting label and Haruomi Hosono's Daisy World Discs. In an effort to escape the German winter, Schmidt spent the ends of 1994 and 1995 in Australia. A man with the same idea was the German music producer Bernd Friedmann, whom he met in Melbourne in 1995.

Two more +N and Datacide albums were produced between 1993 and 1996 as well as one album each month on Rather Interesting, all of them under different names that Schmidt later refers to as working titles, headlines, or simply "words that label a musical idea" rather than being aliases or projects in the traditional sense. Logically all works of Uwe Schmidt would later be summarized under just one name: Atom™. With a lot of traveling, playing live shows worldwide, such as the Love Parade in 1994 and Sonar Barcelona in 1994, as well as the stagnation to be felt in his European surroundings, Schmidt prepared for his departure from the old continent. Together with Dandy Jack, with whom he formed the project Gon, two live shows were played in Santiago de Chile in March and October 1996. Schmidt and the Chilean Dandy Jack, who lived all his life in Germany and Spain, on their way back from Chile, decided to try to relocate to Santiago in 1997.

1996 finally saw Schmidt's Señor Coconut idea come to realization. After a couple of unsuccessful attempts during 1993–1995, still living in Frankfurt, he recorded eight tracks in the later declared electrolatino style. In a fever dream, the name Señor Coconut, placed on top of a coconut texture, a design that would become the artwork of the first Señor Coconut album, appeared to him. Even though Schmidt tried to complete the album in Frankfurt, the preparations for his move to Chile prevented this. In March 1997, Schmidt, together with his colleague Dandy Jack, moved to Santiago de Chile, where they shared a rented house and installed their studios. During March and April, he finished the El Gran Baile album, which would be the first work bearing the name of Señor Coconut.

Uwe Schmidt continued releasing one album per month on his Rather Interesting label, although due to the difficulties of adaptation in Chile, decided to reduce his output. Akashic Records, a Tokyo-based label owned by Tōwa Tei, licensed El Gran Baile for the territory of Japan. Tōwa Tei further requested a remix by Uwe Schmidt. By the end of 1997 Uwe Schmidt and Dandy Jack's ways split and Uwe moved out of the shared house (while Dandy Jack moved back to Germany one year later).

During 1998, Tetsu Inoue and Haruomi Hosono visited Uwe in Santiago. The second HAT album was recorded. Toward the end of 1998, on his way back from Australia to Germany, Bernd Friedmann stopped over in Santiago and together with Uwe Schmidt they recorded their first Flanger album called Templates, which was recorded in a programming tour de force of one week at Uwe's Mira, Musica! studio and released in 1999 on the British Ninja Tune label.

=== 1999–2003 ===
Lassigue Bendthaus' last album, Pop Artificielle, was finally finished and released in 1999. Due to a record company decision the album was released under the name of LB. Pop Artificielle caused quite a media reaction worldwide, due to the fact that the album contained electronic cover versions of famous pop and rock songs. Pop Artificielle stylistically may be considered as being one of the first productions that merged song structures with sounds coming from a '90s techno background, and an initial point for the development of the glitch genre.

During the production process of Pop Artificielle, the idea was born to cover the German electronic pioneers Kraftwerk in a yet-to-be-defined style and as a different production. Meant to be rough sketches, Uwe Schmidt started to program a couple of Kraftwerk cover versions in traditional cha-cha-cha arrangement and decided to make this the second Señor Coconut album. Entertained by the result of the first programmings, he produced a total of 4 songs which he sent to some record companies. One of those companies, Tōwa Tei's Akashic Records, immediately licensed the album, entitled El Baile Alemán, releasing it upon completion of the production in 2000. Uwe Schmidt obtained official permission by Kraftwerk themselves to release El Baile Alemán, though had to remove his version of "Radioactivity". European and North American record companies remained uninterested until triggered by the hype El Baile Alemán had caused in Japan. Soon a European, North American, Mexican, Hong Kong and a Russian release followed and the title "Showroom Dummies" was featured in the Mexican movie Y Tu Mamá También.

Señor Coconut's first European tour started on 19 August 2000 in Germany. A US headlining tour was scheduled, but had to be canceled because of visa problems of one of the 7 Chilean musicians that accompanied Schmidt. In parallel to Señor Coconut project, Schmidt continued working on rather obscure ideas, some for Rather Interesting, some that were released on other labels, such as the Geeez 'n' Gosh (2000 and 2002) albums which musically merge abstract electronic programmings and gospel vocals. Geeez 'n' Gosh was released on the German Mille Plateaux label, which went bankrupt in 2004, leaving Schmidt as well as many fellow musicians, unpaid. The Flanger project was also continued, Friedman and Schmidt recording the Inner Space/Outer Space album in Santiago de Chile, which was then released in 2001.

=== 2004–2008 ===
Apart from his own productions and various collaborations he was solicited to remix artists such as Depeche Mode, Martin L. Gore, Air, Cesária Évora, Juan García Esquivel, Sketch Show, Tōwa Tei, Moreno Veloso, Merzbow and many others. An exclusive track entitled "White Car" was produced for and released on the Japanese anime movie, Appleseed. Still, Uwe Schmidt spent most of the time touring with his Señor Coconut moniker, which had grown to a full 9-man orchestra. The Señor Coconut album Yellow Fever! was released in 2006. The album contained cover versions of Yellow Magic Orchestra songs and became a very successful release in Japan. Amongst the YMO members themselves (Haruomi Hosono, Ryuichi Sakamoto and Yukihiro Takahashi) a large number of musicians appeared on this album such as Mouse on Mars, Akufen, Jorge González and others. Yellow Fever! was performed live at Sónar Sound Tokyo the same year, with both Haruomi Hosono and Yukihiro Takahashi performing each one song with the full orchestra on stage. The Señor Coconut album Around the World was released. It contains guest participations of Stephan Remmler (Trio) and the Austrian crooner Louie Austen.

=== 2009–present ===
Uwe Schmidt's Rather Interesting label remains his largest unified body of work. To date, R.I. alone has over 46 full-length releases under numerous aliases and styles, of which most of them are written, recorded, mixed and mastered by Schmidt himself. Additionally, Schmidt handles all the label management and most all of the album artwork and design.

Remixes for Les, Pérez Prado, Jamie Lidell, Plaid and Japanese superstar Kumi Koda have been continuing to garner attention for Uwe Schmidt. The collaboration Surtek Collective with Vicente Sanfuentes, invented yet another musical style called aciton, a blend of acid and reggaeton. Surtek Collective mainly tours Latin America, playing shows in Mexico, Venezuela, Brasil, Argentina and Chile.

The Flanger album Spirituals was released in 2005 on Bernd Friedmann's label Nonplace and the HEADZ label for the Japanese territory. A couple of years later songs from Spirituals got licensed for the Hungarian movie Bibliotheque Pascal.

From 2007 until 2010, collaborating with Japanese composer Masaki Sakamoto, he produces the album Alien Symphony and the modified (online) version of it, called Meteor Shower which was released in 2010. The same year sees Atom™ acting a mini-role in the Mexican movie Orol. By the end of 2010 a short South American tour is played with the Sr. Coconut project.

Atom™, in collaboration with Japanese musician Toshiyuki Yasuda produces a cover version of the Brazilian Bossa Nova classic "Aguas de Março", pre-released on the compilation Red Hot 2 in June 2011. The vocals on this song are performed by Fernanda Takai and Moreno Veloso.

A photo exhibition called Winterreise was unveiled in Tokyo in May 2011, accompanied by a Playbutton release. Atom™ performances at the Lincoln Center in New York City, Communikey Festival in Boulder, the Raster-Noton/Mute festival at the Roundhouse in London, Labyrinth Festival in Japan plus many others. Exclusive contributions to Ryuichi Sakamoto's Kizunaworld project and Tōwa Tei's Mach online platform.

A second Winterreise exhibition was held in Frankfurt (Germany) in October 2011 as well as the Winterreise soundtrack was released in May 2012 through Raster-Noton. atom-tm.com was launched in July 2012 and serves as Atom™'s official news platform and archive. As a result of the Winterreise release, Atom™ received an invitation from Richie Hawtin to play an ambient set at his club in Ibiza. The invitation was accepted and the then entitled Alpha txt ambient set created, which was then again performed, opening the Labyrinth festival in September the same year. An initially abandoned album, which in 2005 carried the working title Hard Disc Rock (as a self-reference to the 1997 Atom™ title with the same name), resurfaced as HD, after some of the unfinished tracks raised interest at the Raster-Noton label. The album was finished during the second half of 2012, and mixed down during January 2013. The release of HD was then scheduled for March 2013. In the middle of the HD production, the terrible news of Pete Namlook's sudden death reach Schmidt. Months later, as a practical consequence of Namlook's passing away, the Rather Interesting label, which both Pete and Atom ran together since 1994, was shut down forever. Early 2013 sees Atom™ playing various live shows, such as the double opening feature at Berlin's CTM.13, where he first performs Bauteile with colleague Marc Behrens, and later on, together with Material Object, plays a three-hour Alpha txt set. Extensive promotional activities for HD, which, amongst other results, bring Atom™ on the front page of Germany's De:bug magazine and the preparation for the HD and Ground Loop live sets keep Atom™ busy during the first couple of months of 2013.

English electronic band OMD declared themselves "big fans" of Atom™. He worked with the band on their 2023 track, "Healing".

In July 2024, he was criticised for headlining the Outline festival in Russia during the country's war against Ukraine. He argued that the criticism was a "smear campaign" against him. Ukrainian activist Maya Baklanova countered that "All western artists who perform there are normalising the war and the Russian regime".

== Partial discography ==
AAA	Date	Release	Credited artist	Notes
n/a	1988	The Engineers Love	Lassigue Bendthaus	
001	1991-01-15	Matter	Lassigue Bendthaus	
002	1991	Whitehouse	Atom Heart	
008	1992	Cloned	Lassigue Bendthaus	
n/a	1992	Cloned:Binary	Lassigue Bendthaus	
n/a	1993-02-20	Datacide I	Datacide	
014	1993-03-21	Act	Atomu Shinzo	
013	1993-06-10	Stereococktail	Lisa Carbon and Friends	Released in the US as Experimental Post Techno Swing.
n/a	1993	Elektroniikkaa	Atom Heart & Pink Elln	
021	1993-10-10	Coeur Atomique	Coeur Atomique	
025	1993	EX.S	+N	With Victor Sol & Alain "Stocha" Baumann.
035	1994	Render	Lassigue Bendthaus	#15 on CMJ RPM Charts
047	1994	"Overflow"	Lassigue Bendthaus	
026	1994-02-07	Orange (Monochrome Stills)	Atom Heart	
027	1994	Live at SEL/I/S/C	Atom Heart	
038	1994-10-15	Dots	Dots	
055	1996-04-08	Second Nature	Second Nature	With Tetsu Inoue & Bill Laswell.

- Render (U.S. Remixes) (1994)
- plane (1994) (with Victor Sol, credited as +N)
- Softcore (1994)
- Aerial Service Area (1994; with Victor Sol and Niko Heyduck, credited as Aerial Service Area)
- DATacide II (1994)
- VSVN (1995; credited as VSVN)
- Mu (1995; credited as Masters of Psychedelic Ambience)
- Semiacoustic Nature (1995; credited as Semiacoustic Nature)
- Silver Sound 60 (1995; credited as Silver Sound)
- Binary Amplified Super Stereo (1995; credited as BASS)
- Real Intelligence (1995)
- Polyester (1995)
- Flowerhead (1995)
- Machine Paisley (1996; credited as Machine Paisley)
- Tokyo – Frankfurt – New York (1996; with Haruomi Hosono and Tetsu Inoue, credited as HAT)
- Brown (1996; credited as Brown)
- Apart (1996)
- Real Intelligence II (1996)
- built. (1996; Victor Sol, credited as +N)
- Ondas (1996)
- Digital Superimposing (1997; credited as Superficial Depth)
- Trio de Janeiro (1997)
- El Gran Baile (1997)
- Schnittstelle (1998; credited as Schnittstelle)
- DSP-Holiday (1998; with Haruomi Hosono and Tetsu Inoue, credited as HAT)
- Real Intelligence III (1998)
- Pop Artificielle (2000; credited as LB)
- My Life with Jesus (2000)
- Stoffwechsel (2000)
- El Baile Alemán (2000)
- [k] (2001)
- 14 Footballers in Milkchocolate (2001)
- Real Intelligence IV (2002)
- Nobody knows (2002)
- :) (2002)
- Standards (2003)
- Fiesta Songs (2003)
- CMYK (2005)
- iMix (2005)
- Speed-Merengue Mega-Mix 2005 (2005)
- Re-invents the Wheel (2006)
- Yellow Fever! (2006)
- Son of a Glitch (2007)
- The Birth of Acitón (2007)
- Around the World with Señor Coconut (2008)
- Liedgut (2009)
- Muster (2009)
- Music Is Better Than Pussy (2010)
- Winterreise (2012)
- HD (2013)
- Bauteile (2014) (with Marc Behrens)
- Early Reflections (2014) (with Material Object, credited as No. Inc.)
- Human After All (2014) (tribute of the remix from Daft Punk)
- Texturen I (2015) (No.)
- Texturen II (2016) (No.)

== See also ==
- List of ambient music artists
