= Chapter Two (Sacred System album) =

Studio album by Sacred System
- Released: September 16, 1997
- Recorded: Orange Music, West Orange, NJ
- Genre: Ambient dub
- Length: 51:05
- Label: ROIR
- Producer: Bill Laswell

Sacred System chronology
Chapter One: Book of Entrance (1996)	Chapter Two (1997)	Nagual Site (1998)

Bill Laswell chronology
Dub Meltdown (1997)	Chapter Two (1997)	Oscillations Remixes (1997)

Professional ratings
Review scores
Source	Rating
Allmusic	4/5 stars

Chapter Two is the second album by American composer Bill Laswell issued under the moniker Sacred System. It was released on September 16, 1997, by ROIR.

== Track listing ==
All music is composed by Bill Laswell.

No.	Title	Length
1.	"Thunupa"	13:34
2.	"Anubis"	12:36
3.	"Purana"	13:19
4.	"Akapana"	11:36

== Personnel ==
Adapted from the Chapter Two liner notes.

Musicians

- Bill Buchen – gamelan, slit drum, tablas, water drums
- Graham Haynes – flugelhorn, cornet
- Bill Laswell – bass guitar, effects, producer
- Style Scott – drum programming
- Nicky Skopelitis – six-string guitar, twelve-string guitar, sitar

Technical personnel

- Michael Fossenkemper – mastering
- Abdul Malik Mansur – illustrations
- Robert Musso – recording, engineering

== Release history ==
Region	Date	Label	Format	Catalog
United States	1997	ROIR	CD, LP	RUS 8233
