= David Moufang =

German ambient techno musician (born 1966)

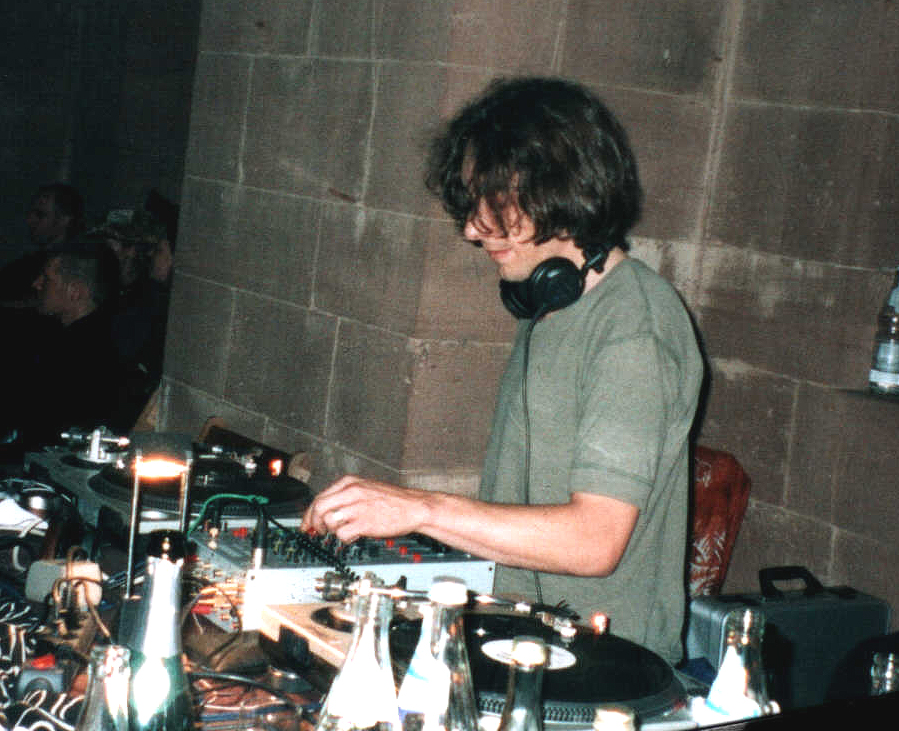
Move D live (2001)

David Moufang (born 1966, in Heidelberg, West Germany) is a German deep house musician. He records with his partner, Jonas Grossmann as Deep Space Network project and his solo releases as Move D. His other projects include Earth to Infinity, Reagenz, Koolfang, and Conjoint.

== Biography ==
Moufang's early influences were space, technology, and, of course, music. After becoming proficient in percussion and guitar, he ventured into the world of early electronic music. In 1989, he was introduced to techno; he spent time in clubs that played ambient techno, and before too long ventured out into production and mixing. Moufang has continued making music into the present day, releasing a number of albums, EPs, and singles, both under the Deep Space Network Moniker as well as his solo name, Move D.

== Discography ==
=== Full-length albums ===
- Deep Space Network - Big Rooms, Source Records, 1993
- Deep Space Network - Earth to Infinity, Source Records, 1993
- Earth to Infinity - Earth to Infinity, Silent Records, 1994
- Deep Space Network - Big Rooms, Instinct Records, 1994
- Reagenz (with Jonah Sharp) - Reagenz, Source Records, 1994
- Reagenz (with Jonah Sharp) - Reagenz, Reflective Records, 1994
- Dr. Atmo & Deep Space Network - i.f., FAX Records, 1994
- Dr. Atmo & Deep Space Network - i.f. 2, FAX Records, 1994
- Koolfang (with Pete Namlook)- Jambient, FAX Records, 1995
- Koolfang (with Pete Namlook)- Gig In the Sky, FAX Records, 1995
- David Moufang - Solitaire, FAX Records, 1995
- Move D - Kunststoff, Source Records, 1995
- Deep Space Network - Traffic, km 20, km2001, 1996
- Move D & Pete Namlook - Exploring the Psychedelic Landscape, FAX Records, 1996
- Move D - Cymbelin, Warp Records, 1996
- Deep Space Network Meets Higher Intelligence Agency, Source Records, 1997
- Move D & Pete Namlook - A Day In the Live!, FAX Records, 1997
- Deep Space Network - Traffic / dsn live '95, mp3.com, 1999
- Move D & Thomas Meinecke - Tomboy / Freud's Baby, Intermedium Recordings/Indigo, 1999
- Move D & Pete Namlook - The Retro Rocket, FAX Records, 1999
- Conjoint - Earprints, Source Records, 2000
- Move D & Pete Namlook - Wired, FAX Records, 2001
- Move D & Pete Namlook - Live In Heidelberg 2001, FAX Records, 2001
- Move D & Benjamin Brunn - Songs from the Beehive, Smallville, 2008
- Move D - Namlook XXIII: Stranger III, FAX Records, 2010
- Move D - fabric 74: Move D, Fabric Records, 2014
- Move D - The Silent Orbiter, ...txt, 2014
- Move D - Building Bridges, Aus Music, 2019

=== EPs ===
- Move D - Silk and Schmoove EP, Compost Records, 2006

=== Singles ===
- Dan Jordan - Slamdunk / Michigan Flake 12", United States of Mars
- d-man / move d - homeworks vol.1 12", Source Records, 1995
- move d - homeworks vol.2 12", Source Records
- robert gordon & david moufang - view to view 12", Source Records
- deep space network - heavy days 12", Source Records
- jonah sharp & david moufang - reagenz 12", Source Records
- ro 70 meets move d 12", Source Records, ?
- move d & ro 70 ii 12", Source Records, ?
- Move D - Hurt Me 12", Compost, ?
- Move D - "Eine kleine Nachtmusik" 12", Fifth Freedom/Soma, ?
- Move D / Sutekh - "Split 10"" 12", Plug Research,
