= Pete Namlook =

German music producer and composer (1960–2012)

Background information
- Born: Peter Kuhlmann; 25 November 1960
- Origin: Frankfurt, West Germany
- Died: 8 November 2012 (aged 51)
- Genres: Ambient, electronic, techno
- Occupations: Producer, Composer
- Labels: FAX +49-69/450464

Peter Kuhlmann [ˈkuːlmaːn] (25 November 1960 – 8 November 2012), known professionally as Pete Namlook ("Namlook" is "Koolman", a phonetic rendering of his real name spelled backwards) was a German ambient and electronic music producer and composer. One music commentator noted that Namlook was "... comfortably the most prolific and arguably the best of the new wave of ambient/house artists of the early 1990s". Namlook himself noted, "I think it's very important to enhance the notion of a global ambient movement, and to realize that a lot of music - which we didn't expect to be ambient is in fact very, very ambient. When you examine other cultures you discover that what we recognize as a very new movement is in fact incredibly ancient".

== Life and career ==
He was born in Frankfurt, West Germany. In 1992, he founded the German record label FAX +49-69/450464, which he oversaw. He was inspired by the music of Eberhard Weber, Miles Davis, Antonio Carlos Jobim, Chopin, Wendy Carlos, Tangerine Dream and Pink Floyd, and most importantly Klaus Schulze.

Namlook released many solo albums, as well as collaboration albums with notable artists such as Klaus Schulze, Bill Laswell, Geir Jenssen (Biosphere), Gaudi, Richie Hawtin, Tetsu Inoue, Uwe Schmidt (Atom), Amir Abadi (Dr. Atmo), and David Moufang (Move D). By August 2005, Namlook and collaborators had released 135 albums (excluding re-releases, vinyl singles, compilations of existing material, and FAX releases beginning with PS, in which he personally was not involved in the music making).

Kuhlmann died on 8 November 2012, at the age of 51, after suffering a heart attack.

== Projects ==
These are all of Namlook's project series on the FAX label, with the number of albums in each series. For one-shot albums, the title is given without a number after it.

(Note: These are only the CD releases. Vinyl singles and EPs are not included. There are no full-length LPs on FAX.)

Solo

- 4Voice (Three releases; 4Voice with Maik Maurice as "arrangement assistant" on two tracks; 4Voice III with Marc Romboy on one track)
- Air (Five releases)
- Atom
- Electronic Music Center
- Music for Ballet
- Namlook (25 releases)
- Season's Greetings (Four releases; one compilation titled The Four Seasons)
- Silence (Three releases of five in total; first two were with Dr. Atmo)
- Syn (Two releases)
- Music for Babies

with Dr. Atmo

- Escape
- Silence (Two releases of five in total; the latter three were Namlook solo)

with Atom Heart

- Jet Chamber (Five releases)

with Karl Berger

- Polytime

with Dandy Jack

- Amp (Two releases)
- Silent Music

with Gaudi

- Re:sonate

with DJ Brainwave

- Limelight

with DJ Criss

- Deltraxx
- Sequential (one track is Namlook with Tetsu Inoue, not DJ Criss)

with DJ Dag

- Adlernebel

with Pascal F.E.O.S.

- Hearts of Space
- Minimalistic Source

with Rob Gordon

- Ozoona

with Robert Görl

- Elektro (Two releases)

with Richie Hawtin

- From Within (Three releases)

with Hubertus Held

- Pete Namlook/Hubertus Held

with Higher Intelligence Agency

- S.H.A.D.O (Two releases)

with Tetsu Inoue

- 62 Eulengasse
- 2350 Broadway (Four releases)
- Sequential (Only one track)
- Shades of Orion (Three releases)
- Time²

with Geir Jenssen

- The Fires of Ork (Two releases)

with Bill Laswell

- The Dark Side of the Moog (appears on four releases of 11 in total, also with Klaus Schulze—the other seven are only Namlook and Schulze)
- Outland Series: 1, 2, 3, IV, 5
- Psychonavigation Series: 1, 2, 3, 4, 5

with Mixmaster Morris

- Dreamfish (Two releases)

with David Moufang

- Koolfang (Three releases)
- Move D / Namlook (23 releases)

with New Composers

- Planetarium (Two releases)
- Russian Spring

with Burhan Öçal

- Sultan (Three releases)

with Jochem Paap

- pp-nmlk

with Peter Prochir

- Miles Apart
- Possible Gardens

with Ludwig Rehberg

- The Putney (Two releases)

with Robert Sattler

- Kooler

with Klaus Schulze

- The Dark Side of the Moog (11 releases)

with Jonah Sharp

- Alien Community (Two releases)
- Wechselspannung (Two releases)

with Wolfram Spyra

- Virtual Vices (Six releases)

with Steve Stoll

- Hemisphere

with Charles Uzzell-Edwards

- A New Consciousness (Two releases)
- Create (Two releases)

with Lorenzo Montanà

- Labyrinth (Five releases)

=== Yesterday & Tomorrow ===
This was a short-lived sub-label of FAX that was created to showcase a more classical side of ambient music. On these releases he goes by Peter Kuhlmann, his real name, rather than Pete Namlook.

- Passion, with Jürgen Rehberg
- Wandering Soul, with Alban Gerhardt
- The Sunken Road, with Jürgen Rehberg and Lucia Mense

== See also ==
- List of ambient music artists
