= Aïyb Dieng =

Senegalese drummer and percussionist

- Born: October 11, 1947; Senegal, West Africa
- Died: July 13, 2025
- Genres: Jazz; world music
- Occupation: Musician
- Instruments: Drums, percussion
- Years active: 1975–2025
- Label: Subharmonic

Aïyb Dieng (b. October 11, 1947) was a Senegalese drummer and percussionist specializing in hand drums. He has recorded two solo albums, including Rhythmagick (1995), and has worked with a wide range of musicians, including as a regular collaborator of bassist/producer Bill Laswell.

== Biography ==
He was born and raised in Senegal, West Africa. By the age of 14 he was playing professionally in a band that consisted of nine relatives.

Dieng received his first album credit on Brian Eno and Jon Hassell's 1980 Fourth World, Vol. 1: Possible Musics, playing percussion on conga drums and a clay drum called a ghatam. Soon after, he worked with jazz pianist Masabumi Kikuchi on Susto. Dieng also played on Mick Jagger's solo project, She's the Boss. Other noteworthy credits include work with Yoko Ono (singer/composer/artist), Bill Laswell (producer/bassist/guitarist), William S. Burroughs (beatnik author), Haruomi Hosono, Bob Marley (reggae singer), Ginger Baker, Collin Walcott, Ed Blackwell, Naná Vasconcelos, Pharoah Sanders, Trilok Gurtu, Umar Bin Hassan, Bernie Worrell, and Bootsy Collins. In 1981 he performed at the Woodstock Jazz Festival, held in celebration of the tenth anniversary of the Creative Music Studio.

In his early years in the U.S., Dieng taught African drumming at the Creative Music Studio in Woodstock, New York. He went on to perform with Karl Berger at Carnegie Hall and Avery Fisher Hall. The chatan was introduced by Dieng. It was played on Herbie Hancock's 1984 album Sound-System. His debut solo album, Rhythmagick, was released in 1995 by Bill Laswell's record label Subharmonic.

Dieng was a featured musician on Ejigayehu "Gigi" Shibawbaw's 2010 album, Mesgana Ethiopia.

Dieng died on July 13, 2025, at the age of 77.

== Personal life ==
Dieng was married to Janet L. Dieng (née Maple), and he had a one child. The family lived in Southwest Florida.

== Discography ==
- Rythmes Africains (1978, Auvidis)
- A-Train - Elephant Dance (Free The World) (1992, Jimco Records – JICK-89180)
- Rhythmagick (1995, Subharmonic)
