= Jonah Sharp =

Scottish electronic musician

Jonah Sharp (alias Spacetime Continuum) is a Scottish electronic musician and producer. Sharp was born in Edinburgh. After starting his musical career as a jazz drummer in London, U.K., he moved to San Francisco, U.S. During the 1990s Sharp released a series of albums on the Astralwerks record label. The first of these, entitled Alien Dreamtime, featured a live recording of ethnobotanist, writer and psychedelic researcher Terence McKenna delivering a series of lectures to the accompaniment of Spacetime Continuum music. Sharp's subsequent albums combined experimental electronic music with subtle jazz elements and elaborate rhythm structures. His work has had a clear influence on contemporary psybient artists, such as Shpongle and others.

Jonah Sharp has also released collaborations with Tetsu Inoue, Bill Laswell, Mixmaster Morris, Pete Namlook, David Moufang, and Plaid. He has remixed songs from Nine Inch Nails, Meat Beat Manifesto, Ponga, Teknostep, Susumu Yokota, and Matt Herbert. He has produced songs for Ursula Rucker and Paradise Boys.

== Discography (as Spacetime Continuum) ==
- Fluresence E.P. (1993)
- Alien Dreamtime (with Terence McKenna) (1993)
- Sea Biscuit (1994)
- Emit Ecaps (1996)
- Remit Recaps (remixes) (1996)
- Real Time (1997)
- Double Fine Zone (1999)
