= Terre Thaemlitz =

American musical artist

- Also known as: Miss Take; DJ Sprinkles; K-S.H.E
- Born: 1968 (age 57–58); Minnesota, U.S.
- Genres: Ambient; Avant-garde; Glitch; House; Jazz
- Occupations: Musician; Artist; Queer philosopher
- Labels: Comatonse Recordings; Mille Plateaux; Instinct
- Website: Terre Thaemlitz

Terre Thaemlitz is an American musician, composer, owner of the record label Comatonse Recordings, and a public speaker. Thaemlitz's work critically combines themes of identity politics — including gender, sexuality, class, linguistics, ethnicity and race — with an ongoing critique of the socio-economics of commercial media production. This diversity of themes is matched by Thaemlitz's wide range of production styles, which include electroacoustic computer music, club-oriented deep house, digital jazz, ambient, and computer-composed neo-expressionist piano solos. Graphic design, photography, illustration, text and video also play a part in Thaemlitz's projects.

== Activism ==
As a speaker and educator on issues of non-essentialist transgender, pansexual and queer sexuality, Thaemlitz has participated in panel discussions throughout Europe and Japan, as well as held numerous cross-cultural sensitivity workshops at Tokyo's Uplink Factory near Thaemlitz's current residence in Kawasaki, Japan.

Terre Thaemlitz's Soil and Tranquilizer releases in the early and mid-1990s served to introduce a "political" form of ambient music, continued in later releases such as Couture Cosmetique and Means from an End, which aim to recast the usually passive artist-listener-environment equation. Thaemlitz's colleagues in the political ambient music front include the sound activist group Ultra-red. Following their remixes of Thaemlitz's Still Life with Numerical Analysis in 1998, Ultra-red joined Thaemlitz on the German label Mille Plateaux for their first two albums: Second Nature: An Electroacoustic Pastoral (1999) and Structural Adjustments (2000).

Terre Thaemlitz published the essay collection Nuisance in 2015, which contained essays on identity and music written between 1996 and its year of publication. In the introduction, which was originally written in 2006, Thaemlitz writes, "My intention is to write in defense of pessimism, and to critically reject the incessant optimism lurking at the core of virtually all media, conferences, concerts, events and symposia – "critical media" or not."

== Discography ==
=== Albums ===
- Tranquilizer, Instinct Ambient, 1994, EX-283-2
- Soil, Instinct Ambient, 1995, AMB:007-2
- Die Roboter Rubato, Mille Plateaux, 1997, MP34
- Couture Cosmetique, Caipirinha Productions, 1997 (US); Daisyworld Records, 1997 (Japan)
- G.R.R.L., Comatonse Recordings, 1997, C.003
- Means From An End, Mille Plateaux, 1999, MPCD53
- Love For Sale, Mille Plateaux, 1999, MPCD53
- Replicas Rubato, Mille Plateaux, 1999, MPCD71 and MPLP71
- Fagjazz, Comatonse Recordings, 2000, C.007
- Interstices, Mille Plateaux, 2000, MP94
- Oh, No! It's Rubato, Mille Plateaux, 2001, MPCD103/MPLP103
- Lovebomb / Ai No Bakudan, Mille Plateaux, 2003, MP117
- Lovebomb / Ai No Bakudan, double disc DVD & audio CD re-issue, Comatonse Recordings, 2005, D.001
- Trans-Sister Radio, Grain of Sound/Base Recordings, 2005, GOS018/BRCD00505
- K-S.H.E (Kami-Sakunobe House Explosion): Routes Not Roots / Ruutsu De Ha Naku Ruuto, Comatonse Recordings, 2006, C.013.CD
- Terre Thaemlitz presents... You? Again?, Mule Electronic, 2006, MED05
- DJ Sprinkles: Midtown 120 Blues, Mule Musiq, 2008, MMD7
- Terre Thaemlitz: Soulnessless, 2012
- Where Dancefloors Stand Still, Mule Musiq, 2013, MMCD41

=== 12" EPs ===
- Comatonse.000, Comatonse Recordings, 1993, C.000 (contains "Raw Through A Straw" and "Tranquilizer")
- Comatonse.000.R1, Comatonse Recordings, 1997, C.000.R1 (translucent vinyl re-issue of C.000 with previously unreleased outro "Pretty Mouth (He's Got One)")
- Terre's Neu Wuss Fusion: She's Hard, Comatonse Recordings, 1998, C.004
- DJ Sprinkles: Sloppy 42nds, Comatonse Recordings, 1998, C.006
- DJ Sprinkles: Bassline.89, Comatonse Recordings, 2001, C.008
- Social Material: Class/Consciousness, Comatonse Recordings, 2001, C.009
- Terre's Neu Wuss Fusion: A Crippled Left Wing Soars With The Right, Comatonse Recordings, 2002, C.010
- Teriko: Hystoric Trace ("Fake"), Hysteric Trace, 2003, INEX-002
- The Opposite Of Genius Or Chance, EN/OF, 2003, EN/OF 013
- Comatonse.000.R2, Comatonse Recordings, 2004, C.000.R2
- K-S.H.E (Kami-Sakunobe House Explosion): Route 1 EP, Comatonse Recordings, 2006, C.013.EP1
- K-S.H.E (Kami-Sakunobe House Explosion): Route 2 EP, Comatonse Recordings, 2006, C.013.EP2
- K-S.H.E (Kami-Sakunobe House Explosion): Route 3 EP, Comatonse Recordings, 2006, C.013.EP3
- You? Again? 1, Mule Electronic, 2006, M019
- You? Again? 2, Mule Electronic, 2006, M020
- You? Again? 3, Mule Electronic, 2006, M025
- Terre's Neu Wuss Fusion: She's Hard Remixes, Mule Musiq, 2007, MM019
- DJ Sprinkles: Grand Central, Pt. I, Mule Musiq, 2008, MM033
- DJ Sprinkles: Brenda's $20 Dilemma (Kuniyuki Remix), Mule Musiq, 2009, MM034
- DJ Sprinkles: Grand Central (Motor City Drum Ensemble Remixes), Mule Musiq, 2009

=== 7" singles ===
- A-MUSAK, Germany: A-Musik, 1999, A-14
- Selling, Netherlands: Bottrop-Boy, 2000, B-BOY 003
- Chugga: A Big 7-Inch, Austria: Klanggallerie, 2003, GG73

=== DJ mixes ===
- DJ Sprinkles: DEEPERAMA (Module Party 5), Japan: Comatonse Recordings, 2003, DCM5
- DJ Sprinkles' DEEPERAMA (Module Party 8), Japan: Comatonse Recordings, 2004, DCM8
- PASTIME PARADISE, Japan: Comatonse Recordings, 2004, DPP1
- DJ Sprinkles' DEEPERAMA (Module Party 9), Japan: Comatonse Recordings, 2004, DCM9
- DJ Sprinkles' DEEPERAMA (Module Party 10), Japan: Comatonse Recordings, 2004, DCM10
- DJ Sprinkles' DEEPERAMA (Module Party 14), Japan: Comatonse Recordings, 2005, DCM14

=== Collaborations ===
- Web, Subharmonic, 1995 (with Bill Laswell)
- Institutional Collaborative, Mille Plateaux, 1995 (with Jane Dowe)
- Yesterday's Heroes: 1979 (with Haco), France: La Louche qui Fait déborder le Vase, 2004, LOUCH 001
- Complete Spiral 12", Comatonse Recordings, 2012 (with Mark Fell)
- Fresh Insights 12", Comatonse Recordings, 2015 (with Mark Fell)

=== Internet-only releases ===
- Below Code, Comatonse Recordings, 2006, C.012

To celebrate the 10th anniversary of Comatonse Records, Thaemlitz released a free best-of compilation CD. Physical copies are no longer in print, but MP3s are available for free (along with a bonus track that did not fit on the original release) through Comatonse.

=== Radio dramas ===
- Trans-Sister Radio – Germany: Hessischer Rundfunk Radio, Channel HR2, Frankfurt M, 2004. Premier airdate November 17, 2004. Hörspiel, Redaktion: Manfred Hess. Also released on CD (Portugal: Grain of Sound/Base Recordings, 2005, GOS018/BRCD00505).
- The Laurence Rassel Show (with Laurence Rassel) – Germany: Hessischer Rundfunk Radio, Channel HR2, Frankfurt M, 2006. Premier airdate April, 2006. Hörspiel, Redaktion: Manfred Hess.

== Filmography ==
- ffwd_mag (DVD + magazine)

Italy: .::invernomuto::., 2005, Issue 3. Audio and photography.

- Lovebomb / Ai No Bakudan (full-length film/music videos)

Written, directed, filmed and edited by Terre Thaemlitz. Originally released on VHS (Japan: Comatonse Recordings, 2003, V.002). In English and Japanese. Japan: Comatonse Recordings, 2005/2003, D.001.NTSC | D.001.PAL.

- Interstices (short film/music videos)

Written, directed, filmed and edited by Terre Thaemlitz. Commissioned by Lovebytes and funded by the Arts Council of England. Released with "Silent Passability" on DVD (Japan: Comatonse Recordings, 2005, D.000.NTSC). Originally released on VHS (Japan: Comatonse Recordings, 2001, V.001) and DVD ("Volatile Media," UK: Lovebytes, 2002, DSP2). Japan: Comatonse Recordings, 2005/2001, D.000.NTSC.

- Silent Passability (Ride to the Countryside) (music video)

Written, directed, filmed and edited by Terre Thaemlitz. Released with Interstices on DVD (Japan: Comatonse Recordings, 2005, D.000.NTSC). Originally released on VHS (US: Comatonse Recordings, 1997, V.000). Japan: Comatonse Recordings, 2005/1997, D.000.NTSC.

- Modulations (documentary)

Directed by Iara Lee, produced by George Gund III, (US: Caipirinha Productions, 1998). Interview.

- Neue Kraft, Neues Werk (Transcodeur Express) (documentary)

Directed by Ninon Liotet and Olivier Schulbaum, (Germany: ZDF 2002). Interview and music.

- Synthetic Pleasures (documentary)

Directed by Iara Lee, produced by George Gund, (US: Caipirinha Productions, 1995). Three tracks featured on soundtrack. Sound engineering for trailer.

== Awards ==
- Album of the Year 2009, for DJ Sprinkles – Midtown 120 Blues, Resident Advisor
- Honorable Mention In Digital Musics, 1999 ORF Prix Ars Electronica
- Best Ambient/Experimental Artist 1997, 1997 Readers' Poll results in URB Magazine (US: March/April 1998)
- Best DJ 1991, Underground Grammy Award from the House of Magic, Midtown Manhattan drag circuit
