= Tetsu Inoue =

Tetsu Inoue 井上徹
- Born: Japan
- Origin: U.S.
- Genres: Ambient, electronic
- Years active: 1993–2007
- Labels: FAX; Instinct

Tetsu Inoue (井上徹) is a former electronic music producer from Japan. He primarily made various types of ambient music, such as ambient techno & lowercase, particularly on the label FAX. He has lived in Japan, San Francisco, and New York and collaborated with musicians such as Pete Namlook, Bill Laswell, Andrew Deutsch, Carl Stone, Terre Thaemlitz, Jonah Sharp, Taylor Deupree, and Uwe Schmidt. After the release of his last album Inland in 2007, Inoue completely disappeared from the public eye.

== Discography ==
=== Albums and collaborations ===
- Shades of Orion (with Pete Namlook) (1993, reissued 2000)
- 2350 Broadway (with Pete Namlook) (1993, reissued 1996)
- DATacide (with Uwe Schmidt as DATacide) (1993)
- Ambiant Otaku (1994, reissued 2000)
- Zenith (as Zenith) (1994)
- Electro Harmonix (with Jonah Sharp) (1994)
- 2350 Broadway Vol. 2 (with Pete Namlook) (1994)
- Cymatic Scan (with Bill Laswell) (1995)
- Flowerhead (with Uwe Schmidt as DATacide) (1995)
- Mu (with Uwe Schmidt as Masters Of Psychedelic Ambiance) (1995)
- Organic Cloud (1995, reissued 2003)
- Slow And Low (1995)
- Second Nature (with Uwe Schmidt and Bill Laswell) (1995)
- Shades of Orion 2 (with Pete Namlook) (1995)
- 62 Eulengasse (with Pete Namlook) (1995)
- Tokyo - Frankfurt - New York (with Haruomi Hosono and Uwe Schmidt as HAT) (1996)
- World Receiver (1996, reissued 2006)
- Shades of Orion 3 (with Pete Namlook) (1996)
- 2350 Broadway Vol. 3 (with Pete Namlook) (1996)
- Waterloo Terminal (1998)
- Psycho-Acoustic (1998)
- Active/Freeze (with Taylor Deupree) (2000)
- Audio (with Charles Uzzell-Edwards and Daimon Beail) (2000)
- Fragment Dots (2000)
- Field Tracker (with Andrew Deutsch) (2001)
- Pict. Soul (with Carl Stone) (2001)
- Yolo (2005)
- Inland (May 2007)
- 2350 Broadway Vol. 4 (with Pete Namlook) (2007)

== See also ==
- Ambient house
- List of ambient music artists
- List of people who disappeared mysteriously (2000–present)
- Yellow Magic Orchestra
