= FAX +49-69/450464 =

German record label

- Founded: 1992
- Founder: Peter Kuhlmann
- Defunct: 2012
- Status: Inactive
- Genre: Ambient, Techno, Trance
- Country of origin: Germany
- Location: Traben-Trarbach

FAX +49-69/450464 (also known as simply Fax or Fax Label) was a German record label founded in Frankfurt in 1992 by ambient musician Peter Kuhlmann (who recorded as Pete Namlook, a phonetic inversion of his surname). It was originally devoted to Namlook's collaborations with other German electronic artists, primarily in hard trance and hardcore styles, but soon expanded with the debut of the ambient Silence and Air projects; consequently, ambient and downtempo music became the predominant focus of the label.

The label's full logo

== Recordings ==
=== Main label ===
The main label had three principal subdivisions, indicated by the first two letters of a given record's catalog number.

• PK was typically for Namlook's solo releases.

• PW (Peter's World) was for collaborations with international artists – including Turkish folk musician Burhan Öçal as Sultan, English DJ Mixmaster Morris as Dreamfish and Japanese ambient artist Tetsu Inoue as Shades of Orion, 2350 Broadway and 62 Eulengasse.

• PS (Peter's Sub-label) released records by other artists—without Namlook—of diverse nationalities and idioms, including US guitarist Robert Musso, bassist Bill Laswell, German techno producer David Moufang (a.k.a. Move D), and Canadian sound artist Chris Meloche.

• PI (Peter's iTunes) released exclusives for iTunes, such as Music for Babies.

=== Sub-labels ===
In addition to these divisions, there were three sub-labels: Yesterday & Tomorrow (YT), Ambient World (AW) and Rather Interesting (RI).

• The Yesterday & Tomorrow sub-label issued a series of albums juxtaposing ambient and the "ambient side" of classical chamber music (which was unofficially discontinued in 1995).
• Ambient World was dedicated to the re-issuing of otherwise out-of-print Fax discs, particularly those from the 1990s.
• Rather Interesting was a label maintained by German IDM musician Uwe Schmidt, with the vast majority of its catalog being his solo material, issued under a multitude of aliases.

== Further details ==
Until the creation of the Ambient World sub-label and the subsequent release of its discography on the iTunes Store, all FAX records were issued in extremely limited quantities, with typically 500–1,000 pressings, depending on the project. This resulted in FAX originals fetching high prices on eBay and other online auction Web sites.

Label founder Pete Namlook died of a heart attack on 8 November 2012. No official statement regarding the label's future was ever made.

== See also ==
- List of electronic music record labels
- Krautrock
- Kosmische
- Music of Germany
- 1992 in music
