= Andy Hawkins discography =

- Studio albums: 6
- Singles: 1

This article presents the complete discography of American guitarist and music producer Andy Hawkins, including his work as a band member and as a collaborating artist. He is most recognized as the guitarist and primary composer for the instrumental post-hardcore outfit Blind Idiot God. He released his debut solo album, titled Halo, under the moniker Azonic.

== As a Solo artist ==
Title	Album details
Halo	Released: July 1, 1994; Label: Strata; Format: CD
Skinner's Black Laboratories (with Justin Broadrick)	Released: August 29, 1995; Label: Sub Rosa; Format: CD

== With Blind Idiot God ==
=== Studio albums ===
Title	Album details
Blind Idiot God	Released: 1987; Label: SST; Format: CD, CS, LP
Undertow	Released: 1988; Label: Enemy; Format: CD, LP
Cyclotron	Released: 1992; Label: Avant; Format: CD
Before Ever After	Released: February 24, 2015; Label: Indivisible; Format: CD, LP

=== Singles ===
Year	Title	Album
1989	Sawtooth	Undertow

== Compilation appearances ==
Year	Song	Album	Label
2006	"River Blindness"	An Anthology of Noise & Electronic Music: Fourth A-Chronology 1937-2005	Sub Rosa

== Other credits ==
Year	Artist	Release	Role(s)	Song(s)
1989	John Zorn	Bandes originales du journal de Spirou	Electric guitar	"Nuit blanche pour les gorilles", "Spirou et Fantasio a New York"
1993	Praxis	Sacrifist	Electric guitar	—
1998	Die Haut	Springer	Remixing	"At First... But Then"
