= Thorr's Hammer =

American-Norwegian band

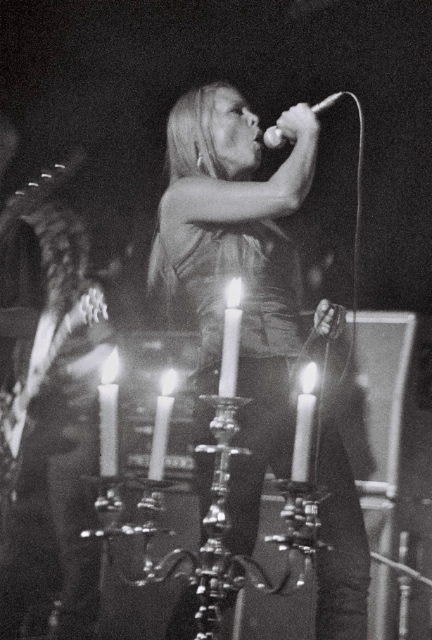

Background information
- Origin: Ballard, Seattle, Washington, U.S.
- Genre: Death-doom
- Years active: 1994−1995, 2009, 2010
- Label: Southern Lord
- Members: Runhild Gammelsæter Greg Anderson Stephen O'Malley James Hale Jamie Sykes

Thorr's Hammer was an American-Norwegian death-doom band.

== History ==
Thorr's Hammer was formed in Ballard, Seattle, Washington by Greg Anderson and Stephen O'Malley during winter 1994–1995. Norwegian exchange student Runhild Gammelsæter joined the band as vocalist/lyricist. Jamie Sykes and James Hale completed the lineup. The band was active for six weeks, during which it played two shows and recorded a demo and the EP Dommedagsnatt. In 1997, the song "Troll" from their EP Dommedagsnatt was released on The Awakening - Females in Extreme Music, a compilation album from Dwell Records.

The band disbanded after Gammelsæter returned to Oslo. Burning Witch was an offshoot of Thorr's Hammer. Gammelsæter and James Plotkin (Khanate) formed Khlyst. Khlyst released the album Chaos Is My Name in 2006, and the live album Chaos Live in 2008.

Thorr's Hammer reunited in 2009 to play at the Supersonic Festival in Birmingham, England, and in 2010 for The Roadburn Festival in Tilburg, Netherlands. In an interview with Rock-A-Rolla magazine, Gammelsæter said the band "might make some new music" in the future.

== Line-up ==
- Runhild Gammelsæter (a.k.a. Ozma) – vocals and lyrics
- Greg Anderson – guitar ("drones and sunns")
- Stephen O'Malley – guitar ("crust and earth")
- James Hale – bass guitar ("subsonic attack") (replaced by Guy Pinhas at the 2009 & 2010 reunion shows)
- Jamie Sykes – drums ("battledrums")

== Discography ==
- Sannhet i Blodet (demo 1995)
- Dommedagsnatt (cassette 1996, CD 1998, CD reissue 2004, picture disc 2004)
- Only Death Is Real – Live by Command of Tom G. Warrior (LP 2019, recorded live at Roadburn 2010)
- Awakening – Females in Extreme Music (CD 1997)
