= Runhild Gammelsæter =

Norwegian singer and biologist

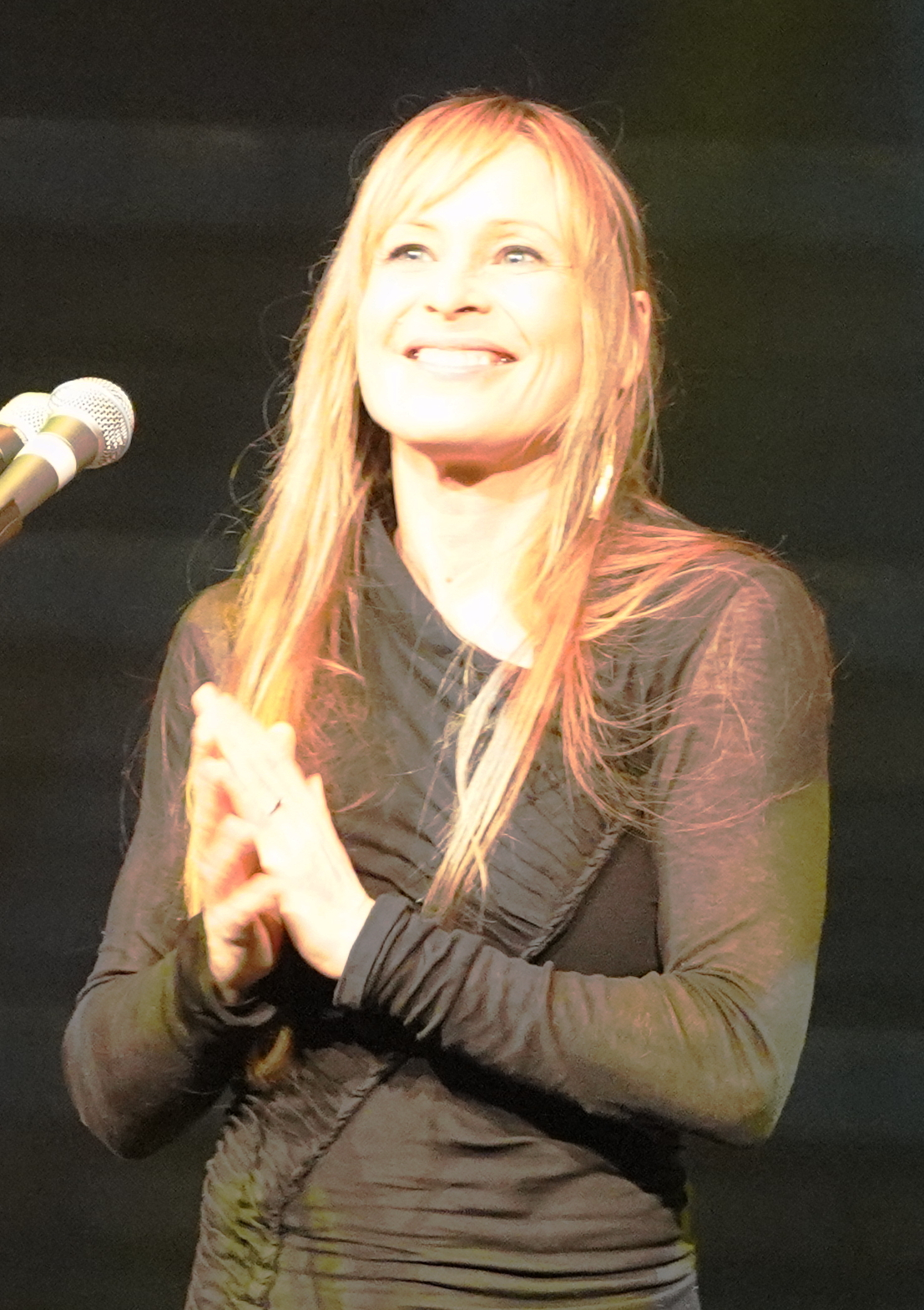
- Gammelsæter in 2025

Background information
- Also known as: Ozma
- Born: 1976
- Origin: Holmestrand, Norway
- Genres: Doom metal, drone doom, dark ambient, noise
- Occupations: Vocalist, lyricist
- Instrument: Vocals
- Years active: 1994 - Present
- Labels: Southern Lord Records; Hydra Head Records; Utech Records

Runhild Gammelsæter is a Norwegian musician notable for being the vocalist for the American bands Thorr's Hammer and Khlyst. She also works as a professional biologist and holds a Ph.D. in cell physiology.

== Biography ==
Runhild Gammelsæter was a 17-year-old foreign exchange student from Norway when she joined Thorr's Hammer along with Stephen O'Malley and Greg Anderson. After six weeks, which was the time it took to release Sannhet i Blodet and record Dommedagsnatt, the band split up due to Runhild returning to Oslo, Norway. Dommedagsnatt was released soon afterwards in 1996 via Southern Lord Records. The four other members of Thorr's Hammer went on to form the band Burning Witch.

In 2006, she helped form the band Khlyst along with James Plotkin and Tim Wyskida. The album Chaos is My Name was released the same year, which also featured two painted portraits by Runhild herself.

On June 28, 2008, her debut solo album, Amplicon, was released through Utech Records.

On December 13, 2014, she released a collaboration album with a renowned Norwegian noise musician Lasse Marhaug, Quantum Entanglement.

Runhild Gammelsæter has a PhD in cell physiology from the Faculty of Medicine of the University of Oslo. She is also a Fulbright Scholar, and is currently serving on the Board of Directors of Norwegian biotechnology company Regenics A.S.

== Discography ==
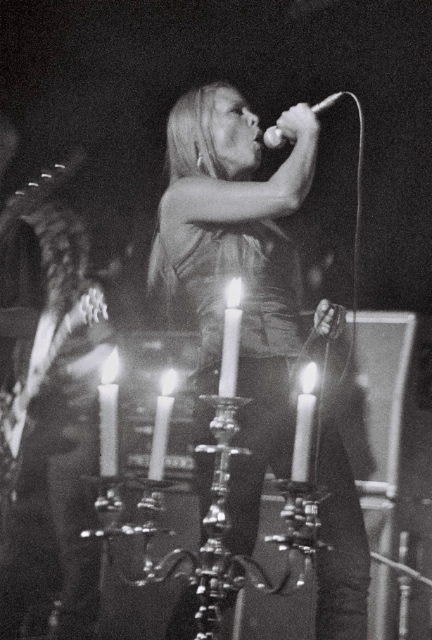
Gammelsæter performing during the 2009 Supersonic Festival at the Custard Factory in Birmingham, England.

=== With Thorr's Hammer ===
- Sannhet i Blodet (demo, 1995)
- Dommedagsnatt (EP, 1996)

=== With Khlyst ===
- Chaos is My Name (full-length, 2006)
- Chaos Live (DVD, 2008)

=== Solo ===
- Amplicon (full-length, 2008)

=== With Lasse Marhaug ===
- Quantum Entanglement (full-length, 2014)
- Higgs Boson (full-length, 2022)

=== As a guest or session musician ===
- White1 - Sunn O))) (full-length, 2003) lyrics and vocals for the song "The Gates of Ballard"
- Ingentes Atque Decorii Vexilliferi Apokalypsis - Fleurety (7-inch EP, 2009) vocals on the song "Descent Into Darkness"
