= Khlyst (band) =

American drone doom band

- Origin: New York City
- Genres: Doom metal, drone doom
- Years active: 2006 -
- Labels: Hydra Head Records
- Members: Runhild Gammelsæter; James Plotkin; Tim Wyskida

Khlyst is an American drone doom band, formed in 2006.

In Russian, the word means "switch", "whip", or "scourge".

== Biography ==
Khlyst is a drone doom project that features guitarist James Plotkin (Khanate, Phantomsmasher, OLD), vocalist Runhild Gammelsæter (Thorr's Hammer), and drummer Tim Wyskida (Khanate, Blind Idiot God).

The band's debut album, Chaos Is My Name, was reviewed by Max Deneau of Exclaim!, who stated, "There's plenty of buried melody to be found, and the disc is overall deceptively mellow, once you're desensitized to the vocal presence."

== Line-up ==
- Runhild Gammelsæter - vocals, text
- James Plotkin - Electric guitar, laptop
- Tim Wyskida - drums, gong

== Discography ==
- Chaos Is My Name (CD, Hydra Head Records, 2006)
- Chaos Live (DVD, Hydra Head Records, 2008) Limited to 500 copies, worldwide. Recorded November 2, 2006 in New York City.
