= Before Ever After =

- CD edition cover

Studio album by Blind Idiot God
- Released: Vinyl: February 24, 2015; CD: April 6, 2015
- Recorded: 2008 – 2010
- Studio: The Barber Shop, NJ; Orange Sound Studios, NY
- Genre: Noise rock, math rock, dub
- Length: 75:24
- Label: Indivisible
- Producer: Andy Hawkins, Bill Laswell

Blind Idiot God chronology
Cyclotron (1992)	Before Ever After (2015)

Before Ever After is the fourth studio album by Blind Idiot God, released by Indivisible Records on February 24, 2015. It marks the first album of new studio material by the band since Cyclotron, released twenty-two years prior. Produced by guitarist Andy Hawkins with composer Bill Laswell, the album was first issued on double LP, then on CD and finally as a digital download. Laswell has described Before Ever After as the band's apex.

== Background ==
When drummer Ted Epstein left the band in 1996, guitarist Andy Hawkins and Gabriel Katz placed Blind Idiot God on indefinite hiatus while they searched for his replacement. Tim Wyskida, formerly of Khanate, joined them on drums in 2001 and Blind Idiot God began recording new material, with more emphasis placed on improvisation. In 2006 the band returned to the stage and performed a series of shows around New York City. Gabriel Katz, who had previously delayed band activities after developing tendinitis and hearing problems, finally left the band and was replaced by Will Dahl in 2012.

News of Before Ever After's release was first announced through the band's Facebook page on June 4, 2014. The album comprises music composed over a ten year period from when the band first reunited in 2001. In 2013, three tracks recorded for the album titled "Barrage", "Shutdown" and "High and Mighty" appeared in the HBO documentary Downloaded, a film by Alex Winter examining the history of Napster. A new piece titled "Voice of the Structure", a solo recording by Andy Hawkins, was released on August 6 on Azonic's Bandcamp website and is set to appear on the album.

The artwork for Before Ever After was created by Seldon Hunt, known for his work with Earth, Neurosis, and the Melvins.

== Track listing ==
All tracks are written by Blind Idiot God.

Side one
No.	Title	Length
1.	"Twenty Four Hour Dawn"	8:53
2.	"Night Driver"	6:27
3.	"Antiquity"	3:42

Side two
No.	Title	Length
1.	"Earthmover"	6:23
2.	"FUB"	6:46
3.	"Barrage"	5:45

Side three
No.	Title	Length
1.	"High and Mighty"	5:53
2.	"Voice of the Structure"	4:37
3.	"Under the Weight"	4:00
4.	"Ramshackle"	4:36

Side four
No.	Title	Length
1.	"Wheels of Progress"	7:55
2.	"Strung"	6:18
3.	"Shutdown"	4:33

CD edition track listing
No.	Title	Length
1.	"Twenty Four Hour Dawn"	8:50
2.	"High and Mighty"	5:50
3.	"Antiquity"	3:39
4.	"Earthmover"	6:21
5.	"Night Driver"	6:25
6.	"Wheels of Progress"	7:53
7.	"Ramshackle"	4:34
8.	"Voice of the Structure"	4:36
9.	"Under the Weight"	3:57
10.	"FUB"	6:44
11.	"Barrage"	5:42
12.	"Strung"	6:15
13.	"Shutdown"	4:32

== Personnel ==
Adapted from the Before Ever After liner notes.

Blind Idiot God

- Andy Hawkins – electric guitar, 7-string guitar, production, mixing
- Gabriel Katz – 5-string fretted bass, 5-string fretless bass
- Tim Wyskida – drums

Production and design

- Jason Corsaro – engineering
- James Dellatacoma – engineering, mixing
- Alex DeTurk – mastering
- Michael Fossenkemper – mastering
- Seldon Hunt – illustrations, design
- Bill Laswell – production, mixing
- Robert Musso – engineering

== Release history ==
Region	Date	Label	Format	Catalog
United States	2015	Indivisible	CD, LP	0001.1
