= Gnaw =

- Origin: New York CIty, United States
- Genres: Noise, experimental metal
- Years active: 2006–present
- Labels: Translation Loss; Sleeping Giant Glossolali; Seventh Rule Recordings; Conspiracy Records
- Members: Alan Dubin; Brian Beatrice; Carter Thornton; Dana Schechter; Robin Fowler; Jun Mizumachi; Adam Morosky
- Past members: Jamie Sykes Eric Neuser

Gnaw is a New York City noise band founded in 2006 by Alan Dubin (of OLD, Khanate), Carter Thornton (of Enos Slaughter and others), Jun Mizumachi (a former live member of Ike Yard) and drummer Jamie Sykes (of Burning Witch). Guitarist/sound designer Brian Beatrice and drummer Eric Neuser later joined the group. The current lineup consists of Dubin, Thornton, Brian Beatrice, Dana Schechter (Insect Ark, Angels of Light, Swans), Robin Fowler (Pants Exploder, Drownyard), and Adam Morosky (Time Ghost). Founding member Mizumachi, while no longer touring, is still a contributing member.

== Style ==
In addition to the traditional 4 piece rock format and string and wind instruments, Gnaw utilizes synthesis modulation, found sound and manipulated recordings. In issue 302, The Wire magazine called Gnaw "a terrifying rock sextet whose blackened vision has enough dark energy to blot out the sun". The publication described Gnaw's debut album, This Face, as "unsettling but vital listening".

== History ==
Gnaw's debut album, This Face, was named number 17 of the year in Rock-A-Rolla magazine and Fact went on to post it as number 23 on its list of best "post-metal" albums ever made.

In 2013, Gnaw signed with Seventh Rule Recordings who released their second album, Horrible Chamber, on October 15. "Horrible Chamber" was reviewed positively by most publications including Pitchfork, Wire and Dusted, who said, "Gnaw’s combination of murderous riffs, sludgy bass, dark ambience and soulless electronica is mastered expertly on Horrible Chamber, resulting in a seven-song suite that pulls in all directions whilst staying wholly cohesive." WIRE said, "Horrible Chamber raises goosebumps, instils despair, and suggests fruitful future paths for metal in the process".

After Mizumachi's return to Japan in 2016, Dana Schechter of Insect Ark began performing live with the band and, after contributing to recordings, joined the band full time in January, 2017. The band's third album, Cutting Pieces, was released to wide acclaim on October 27, 2017.

With Schecter's increased commitment to Insect Ark and Swans, Morosky began filling in on live dates in September 2019 before joining as a full time contributing member. Gnaw's Barking Orders EP was released in January 2020 on Sleeping Giant Glossolali and they are currently composing a full length follow up to Cutting Pieces. Initial tracks were recorded in July 2019 at Menegroth The Thousand Caves Recording Studios with Colin Marston.

== Members ==
- Alan Dubin (vocals, synthesizing, processing)
- Brian Beatrice (guitar, bass, studio production, manipulation and processing)
- Carter Thornton (guitar, bass, multi-instrumentalist, sound recordings and manipulation)
- Adam Morosky (synthesis, sound effects, noise contraptions)
- Jun Mizumachi (synthesis, recording and studio manipulation)
- Robin Fowler (drums)
- Past members: Jamie Sykes (drums), Eric Neuser (drums), Dana Schechter (lap steel)

== Discography ==
- This Face (Conspiracy Records, 2009)
- Horrible Chamber (Seventh Rule Recordings, 2013)
- Cutting Pieces (Translation Loss, 2017)
- Barking Orders (Sleeping Giant Glossolalia, 2020)
