= Oxbow (band) =

American experimental rock band

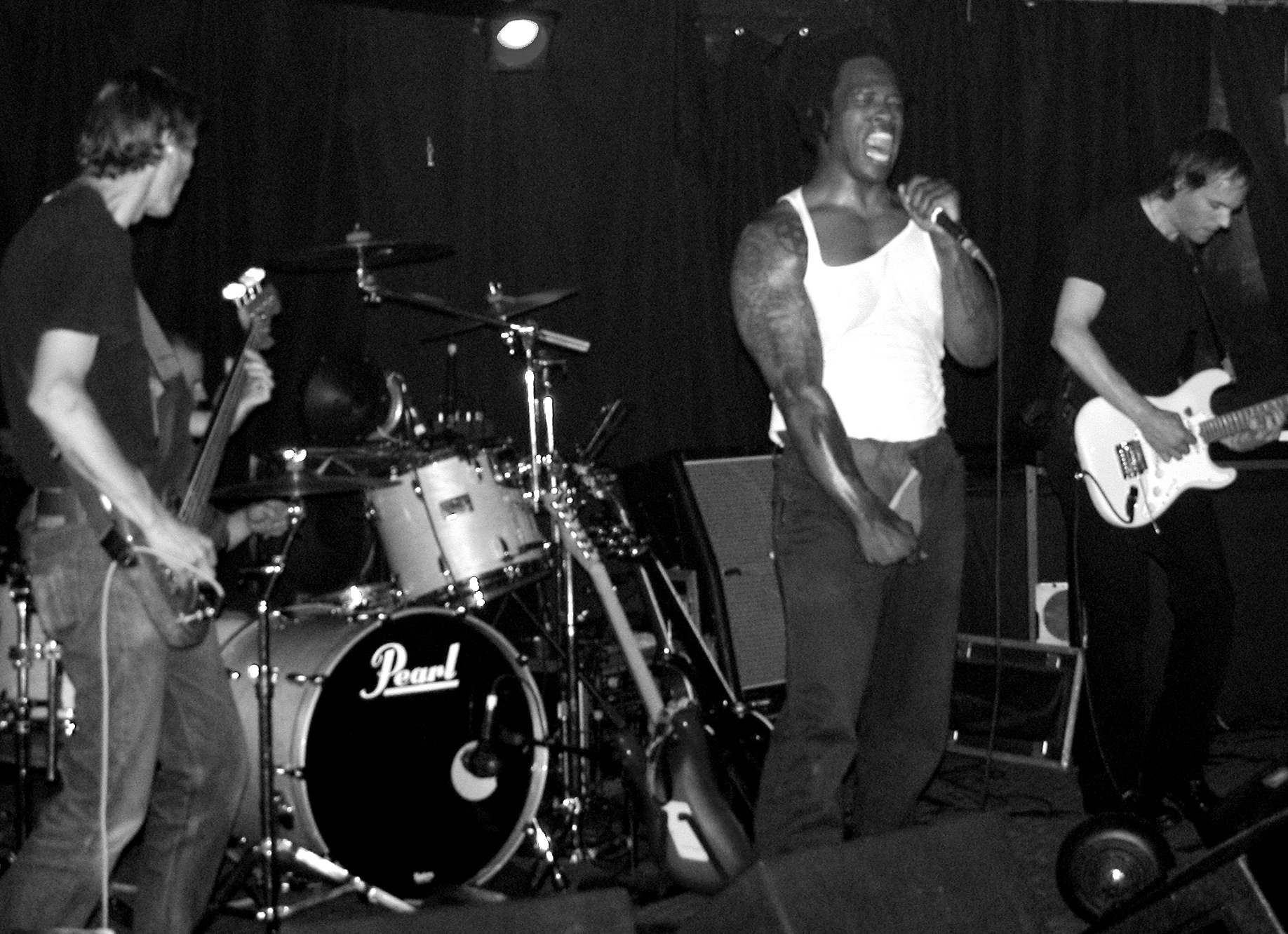
- The band on stage in 2004

Background information
- Also known as: Ox Bow (1988–1991)
- Origin: San Francisco, California
- Genres: Experimental rock, noise rock
- Years active: 1988–2024
- Labels: Hydra Head, Neurot Recordings, Ipecac Recordings, SST Records, Brinkman Records, Crippled Dick Hot Wax Records, CFY Records
- Past members: Dan Adams; Greg Davis; Tom Dobrov; Eugene S. Robinson; Niko Wenner

Oxbow was an American experimental rock band from San Francisco, California. Founded in 1988, the band released eight studio albums, disbanding in 2024.

== History ==
Oxbow began as a recording project. In 1988 Eugene Robinson (vocals, lyrics) and Niko Wenner (guitar, bass, keyboards, producer, music) wrote songs with an approach decidedly different from Whipping Boy, their band at the time. Recruiting their former Whipping Boy bandmate Bart Thurber as sound engineer, recording commenced after Robinson’s attempt at a solo album failed and was abandoned due to his “zero musical skills.”

Wenner concocted an underlying musical architecture for his abrasive-then-plangent music, through use of arch form and musical palindromes unusual in the noise music genre the band was often placed. This organizing structure later grew to encompass the second Oxbow recording as well, and drew relationships between the two. For his part Robinson changed his vocal approach to include in-the-studio improvisations and extensive vocal multi-tracking. This first record, titled Fuckfest has drumming split evenly between Greg Davis and Tom Dobrov. The record received positive response, so they decided to continue. Dan Adams (bass in Oxbow, drums in Whipping Boy) joined immediately on completion of the first recording. All but Davis were at various times members of Whipping Boy, Wenner and Dobrov had been bandmates in the hardcore band Grim Reality Dobrov departed amicably after the band's 1995 European tour, but performed as guest second-drummer, with Davis, for the studio recording of "Shine (Glimmer)" on the 2002 album An Evil Heat.

The first album from Oxbow, Fuckfest, was released in 1989. It was described as "one of the most unique first statements in modern avant-rock" by Rock-A-Rolla magazine, "staggeringly eclectic" by Simon Reynolds, and "a fierce, rigorous album that challenges almost every preconception rock listeners might have" by Allmusic. Fuckfest was followed by King of the Jews (1991) and then by two Steve Albini-recorded albums: Let Me Be a Woman (1995) and Serenade in Red (1996–97), the latter featuring guest vocals from Marianne Faithfull. An Evil Heat followed in 2002 on Neurosis' Neurot Recordings label. Oxbow's 2007 album The Narcotic Story was named the number one album in the "Best of 2007" by Rock-A-Rolla magazine, and was listed with three other bands' albums in the nomination of Joe Chiccarelli as 'Producer of the Year' at the 50th Grammy Awards.

In May 2017 Oxbow released Thin Black Duke their seventh full-length album, like The Narcotic Story produced by Joe Chiccarelli and Niko Wenner and again on Hydra Head Records, to universal critical acclaim.

They returned in 2023 with Love’s Holiday, again produced by Joe Chiccarelli and Niko Wenner, released July 21 that year on Ipecac Recordings, again to universal critical acclaim.

On July 7, 2024, Robinson announced his departure from the band. On July 11, guitarist Niko Wenner said that an unresolved allegation made against him led to the cancellation of the tour, and that Oxbow as a band "no longer exists".

== Musical style ==
Oxbow's material is musically varied and has been compared both to bands such as Neurosis and The Birthday Party, and modern classical composers such as Penderecki and John Luther Adams. Elements of blues, noise rock, heavy metal, jazz, and contemporary classical music are consistently mentioned. Allmusic writer Jason Ankeny identified elements of free jazz and musique concrète.

== Members ==
=== Final line-up ===
- Dan Adams – bass guitar (1990–2024)
- Greg Davis – drums, percussion (1989–2024)
- Eugene S. Robinson – vocals, lyrics (1988–2024), bass guitar, drums (1988)
- Niko Wenner – guitars, keyboards, music (1988–2024), bass guitar studio only (1988–1992), vocals (2017–2024)

=== Former members ===
- Tom Dobrov – drums, percussion (1989–1995)

=== Timeline ===
==== Dan Adams: Bass Guitar ====
Dan Adams, multi-instrumentalist, engineer who worked on animatronics in films such as Free Willie and Anaconda, and award-winning jazz drummer also used to drum for North Carolina's hardcore punk band the Ugly Americans.

==== Eugene S. Robinson: Vocals ====
On Fuckfest "Robinson howls in a high-pitched, anguished voice somewhere between Robert Plant and Birthday Party-era Nick Cave", although his lyrics sound incomprehensible.

Robinson has provided guest vocals for several bands, including Soothsayer, Xiu Xiu, Black Sun, Old Man Gloom, DJ /Rupture, Ultraphallus, Dead Kennedys, and his notable side project Buñuel, among others.

Vocalist Robinson, also an amateur fighter and a black belt in Brazilian Jiu Jitsu under Leopoldo Serao, has on several occasions dealt with misbehaving audience members with physical force. He is also known for shedding his clothes on stage. Robinson is the author of the books "Paternostra", "Les sons inimitables de l'amour: un plan à trois en quatre actes", A Long Slow Screw and Fight: Everything You Ever Wanted to Know About Ass-Kicking but Were Afraid You'd Get Your Ass Kicked for Asking, and worked as an Editor-at-Large at OZY OZY.com, in addition to being a video host of the now-defunct Knuckle Up and his own The Eugene S. Robinson Show Stomper, as well as The Care/Don't Care Preview on Bloody Elbow and a regular contributor to Vice magazine. He has a blog called Look What You Made Me Do. He has also had his written work appear in the Los Angeles Times, GQ, the New York Times, the LA Weekly, Ad Age, The Quietus, PC Gamer, Hustler, Code, Revolver, Decibel and The Wire, among others. His infrequent film and television work has also seen him appearing in Leonard Part 6 with Bill Cosby, NBC's Midnight Caller, ABC's King of Love, MTV's Liquid Television's Las Apassionadas, and commercials most notably one directed by Gus Van Sant for Miller Genuine Draft, along with winning an Online Journalism Award for Online Commentary, Small Newsroom.

In 2026, Robinson suffered a stroke, causing him to lose the ability to read, speak and write.

==== Niko Wenner: Guitars, Keyboards ====
Oxbow composer, arranger, and producer Wenner "a master of sculpting noise and tone" has also toured and recorded as part of the bands God, Swell, Celan, and Jellyfish.

Wenner has engineered recordings for Oxbow and others, composed and performed music for contemporary dance, and appeared performing in an Academy Award nominee for best short film.

== Discography ==
=== Albums ===
Year	Title	Label
1989	Fuckfest	CFY Records / Pathological Records / Hydra Head Records
1991	King of the Jews	CFY Records / Pathological Records / Hydra Head Records
1995	Let Me Be a Woman	Brinkman Records / Crippled Dick Hot Wax Records
1996	Serenade in Red	Crippled Dick Hot Wax Records / SST Records
2002	An Evil Heat	Neurot Recordings / Concrete Lo Fi Records
2007	The Narcotic Story	Hydra Head Records
2017	Thin Black Duke	Hydra Head Records
2023	Love's Holiday	Ipecac Records

=== EPs ===
1996	Insylum/The Stabbing Hand (with Marianne Faithfull / Kathy Acker)	Crippled Dick Hot Wax Records	Limited Release Picture Disc EP
2009	Songs for the French	Hydra Head Records	Limited Release Vinyl EP

=== Compilations ===
1992	The Balls in the Great Meat Grinder Collection CD (compiles the albums King of the Jews and Fuckfest on a single CD, in that order)	Pathological Records
1997	Fuckfest/King of the Jews 2CD (compiles the albums Fuckfest and King of the Jews in a two CD package)	Crippled Dick Hot Wax Records
2006	Love That's Last CD/DVD (CD includes new, and previously released songs; DVD includes two live performances, a documentary, two 5.1 surround re-mixes, etc., see "DVD" below)	Hydra Head Records
2007	Remixed & Covered CD (Two CD package of remixes/covers of the band Xiu Xiu; Oxbow acoustic duo perform "Saturn.")	5 Rue Christine

=== Live albums ===
2008	Oxbow presents: Love's Holiday Orchestra Oxbow duo live at Supersonic 2007 (featuring Justin Broadrick and Stephen O'Malley) (12" vinyl only)	Capsule Records
2008	Fuckfest/12 Galaxies (12 Galaxies: Oxbow acoustic quartet recorded live at 12 Galaxies club, San Francisco, 2008) (limited, hand signed two-cd package)	Hydra Head Records
2009	Songs for the French (Side "There" live recordings, Europe, 2008) (12" vinyl only)	Hydra Head Records
2011	: : stone & towering edifice : LIVE at the BAM (Oxbow acoustic quartet live at UC Berkeley Art Museum, Berkeley, 2010) (CD only)	Hydra Head Records
2022	An Eternal Reminder Of Not Today - Live at Moers (Oxbow & Peter Brötzmann live at Moers Festival, Moers, Germany, 2018)	Trost Records / SGG

=== Splits ===
1999	Oxbow meet White Tornado	Wallace Records
2011	Oxbow / Kill Kill Kill (Oxbow song is previously unreleased alternate version of "Daughter" from 1991 LP, King of the Jews. Mastered 1991/2011 Golden Mastering / Kill Kill Kill song recorded at Paul Terrace, Los Angeles, CA, 2011) (Vinyl 7")	Hydra Head Records

=== Music videos ===
2006	S Bar X (video + 5.1 audio mix on Love That's Last DVD, song from An Evil Heat (2002))	Hydra Head Records
2017	Cold & Well-Lit Place (song from Thin Black Duke (2017))	Hydra Head Records
2017	Other People (song from Thin Black Duke)	Hydra Head Records
2017	Host (song from Thin Black Duke)	Hydra Head Records
2023	1000 Hours (song from Love's Holiday (2023))	Ipecac Recordings
2023	Icy White & Crystalline (song from Love's Holiday)	Ipecac Recordings
2023	Dead Ahead (song from Love's Holiday)	Ipecac Recordings
2023	Lovely Murk (ft. Kristin Hayter/Lingua Ignota (song from Love's Holiday)	Ipecac Recordings
2023	The Night The Room Started Burning (song from Love's Holiday)	Ipecac Recordings
2023	[INTERSTITIAL] (song from Love's Holiday)	Ipecac Recordings
2023	Gunwale (song from Love's Holiday)	Ipecac Recordings
2024	Million Dollar Weekend (song from Love's Holiday)	Ipecac Recordings
2024	Second Talk (song from Love's Holiday)	Ipecac Recordings
2024	All Gone (song from Love's Holiday)	Ipecac Recordings

=== DVDs ===
2006	Love That's Last: A Wholly Hypnographic and Disturbing Work Regarding Oxbow	Hydra Head Records

DVD included in the CD/DVD compilation Love That's Last: A Wholly Hypnographic and Disturbing Work Regarding Oxbow. There are six selections included on the DVD:

1. Music For Adults (documentary film)
2. Music For Adults (outtakes)
3. Oxbow live in Diksmuide, Belgium, Muziekclub 4AD May 19, 2002
4. Oxbow live in San Francisco, USA, Great American Music Hall November 14, 2004
5. S Bar X (video + 5.1 audio mix)
6. The Snake &... (5.1 audio mix)

2011	The Luxury of Empire	Flowerskull

DVD based on Oxbow's 2009 European tour. Contains three selections:

1. "The Luxury of Empire" by Mariexxme (documentary film)
2. "Still Before" by Manuel Liebeskind (documentary film)
3. Oxbow live in Paris, France, La Maroquinerie November 8, 2009

2012	oxbow in camera	Hydra Head Records

16mm film, multi-camera, three selections are performed live, one selection is performed to the studio recording. There are 4 selections included on the DVD:

1. The Snake...
2. She's a Find
3. Ecce Homo
4. Bomb
