= Clean Hands Go Foul =

2009 album by Khanate

Studio album by Khanate
- Released: May 26, 2009
- Recorded: 2005, 2006, 2008
- Studio: Seizures Palace
- Genre: Drone metal, doom metal
- Length: 60:09
- Label: Hydra Head
- Producer: James Plotkin

Khanate chronology
Capture & Release (2005)	Clean Hands Go Foul (2009)	To Be Cruel (2023)

Professional ratings
Review scores
Source	Rating
About.com	3/5 stars
AllMusic	3.5/5 stars
Pitchfork	(7.6/10)
Rock Sound	9/10 stars

Clean Hands Go Foul is the fourth studio album by American drone metal band Khanate. It was released in May 26, 2009 on Hydra Head Records.

== Track listing ==
All music is composed by Khanate. All lyrics by Alan Dubin.

No.	Title	Length
1.	"Wings from Spine"	6:48
2.	"In That Corner"	9:19
3.	"Clean My Heart"	11:10
4.	"Every God Damn Thing"	32:52
Total length:		60:09

== Personnel ==
- Alan Dubin – vocals
- Stephen O'Malley – guitars
- James Plotkin – bass
- Tim Wyskida – drums
