= Crippled Lucifer =

Studio album by Burning Witch
- Released: 1998
- Recorded: 1996–97
- Studio: Robert Lang (Shoreline, Washington)
- Genres: Doom metal; sludge metal; drone metal
- Length: 63:30 (1998 edition); 95:54 (2008 2CD edition); 165:22 (3CD edition)
- Label: Southern Lord Records (SUNN02)

Burning Witch chronology
Towers... (1998)	Crippled Lucifer (1998)	Goatsnake/Burning Witch (2000)

Professional ratings
Review scores
Source	Rating
AllMusic	4/5 stars
Revolver	4/5 stars

Crippled Lucifer is the only album by Burning Witch which is a compilation album of EP tracks. Its complete title is Crippled Lucifer (Seven Psalms for Our Lord of Light).

It consists of three tracks taken from their Rift.Canyon.Dreams release ("Warning Signs", "Stillborn" and "History of Hell") and four tracks from their Towers... release ("Sacred Predictions", "Country Doctor", "Tower Place" and "Sea Hag").

It was first released on CD in 1998 on Southern Lord Records and Bad Acid Records. Bad Acid released the European digipack version of which only 2000 were made. Southern Lord handled the American release of which there were effectively three presses. The first pressing's cover was incorrectly printed so it was repressed. Then, it was pressed for a third time, this time with a different cover altogether. In 1999, it was released on cassette by Mystic Production.

In 2008, Southern Lord reissued the album as a double-disc set, restoring the one missing track from Rift.Canyon.Dreams, and two tracks from splits that also got excluded from the single-disc version, as well as the original track order. This re-issue was renamed Crippled Lucifer (Ten Psalms for Our Lord of Light) due to the extra tracks.

In this reissue, disc one, tracks 1–4 are the Towers EP, disc one, track five is from the split with Goatsnake, disc two, tracks one through four are the Rift.Canyon.Dreams EP, and disc two, track five is from the split with Asva. Also, for the limited edition mailorder version (which is 2000 numbered copies), there is a dropcard which allows the owner to download a rare live show (with an unreleased song "Jubilex") as well as the unreleased demo. These six tracks were also released as the third disc of the Japanese edition.

== Track listing ==
All tracks are written by Burning Witch.

No.	Title	Length
1.	"Warning Signs"	8:22
2.	"Stillborn"	11:57
3.	"History of Hell"	6:03
4.	"Sacred Predictions"	7:05
5.	"Country Doctor"	10:20
6.	"Tower Place"	5:25
7.	"Sea Hag"	14:18

=== 2008 reissue ===
All tracks are written by Burning Witch.

Disc one
No.	Title	Length
1.	"Sacred Predictions"	7:03
2.	"Country Doctor"	10:19
3.	"Tower Place"	5:24
4.	"Sea Hag"	14:20
5.	"The Bleeder"	9:57

Disc two
No.	Title	Length
1.	"Warning Signs"	8:22
2.	"Stillborn"	11:57
3.	"History of Hell (Crippled Lucifer)"	6:02
4.	"Communion"	9:25
5.	"Rift.Canyon.Dreams"	13:08

Disc three (Japan only)
No.	Title	Length
1.	"The Country Doctor"	9:43
2.	"Tower Place / The Sea Hag"	19:41
3.	"Sea Hag (live)"	9:55
4.	"Country Doctor (live)"	9:31
5.	"Bleeder (live)"	10:02
6.	"Jubilex (live)"	10:36
