= Archdimension Now =

Studio album by Mr. Peter Hayden
- Released: 11 April 2014
- Genre: Post-rock; post-metal
- Length: 125:46
- Label: Kauriala Society

Mr. Peter Hayden chronology
Born A Trip (2012)	Archdimension Now (2014)	Eternal Hayden (2017)

Professional ratings
Review scores
Source	Rating
Soundi	4/5 stars
Inferno Magazine	4/5 stars

Archdimension Now is the third album by Finnish heavy psychedelic group Mr. Peter Hayden and was released in spring 2014. This is the third and final part of an album trilogy formed with the band's two earlier releases Faster Than Speed (2010) and Born A Trip (2012). Continuing the growth in track length, Archdimension Now consists of only one track that spans over two hours. On this release, their sound and composition was considered somewhat unique to the genres they are considered to represent. Deeper analysis on the album was given by David Bowes on Rock-A-Rolla issue #49

”Archdimension Now is a triumph as wide as a galaxy, a starfire of light and hallucinatory visions across a backdrop as dark as the void. Split across two, hour-long compositions, there is a certain degree of effort involved in appreciating what’s on offer, but that’s the point. The massive scope allows for complete immersion, for listeners to cocoon themselves in sheer walls of drone and fractured samples, and for the pulsation and sonar synth to pierce the synapses with their sharp, unforgiving presence. This is less an album than a microcosm, a dimension mapped on plastic and transmitted through light, sound and grinning, endless otherness.”

== Track listing ==
=== Digital ===
No.	Title	Length
1.	"Archdimension Now"	125:46
Total length:		125:46

=== Double CD ===
Disc one

No.	Title	Length
1.	"Archdimension Now (Disc 1)"	67:47
Total length:		67:47

Disc two

No.	Title	Length
1.	"Archdimension Now (Disc 2)"	57:58
Total length:		57:58

== Personnel ==
- V. Ajomo – synthesizers
- L. Kivelä – bass
- JP Koivisto – guitars
- S. Kuosmanen – synthesizers
- T. Santamaa – drums
- V. Vatanen – guitars
