= Thin Black Duke =

Studio album by Oxbow
- Released: May 5, 2017
- Studio: Various: 25th Street Recording; (Oakland, California) Sunset Sound Recorders; (Hollywood, California); Ruminator Audio; (San Francisco, California)
- Genre: Art rock; post-hardcore
- Length: 38:59
- Label: Hydra Head
- Producer: Joe Chiccarelli; Niko Wenner

Oxbow chronology
The Narcotic Story (2007)	Thin Black Duke (2017)	An Eternal Reminder of Not Today - Live at Moers (2022)

Thin Black Duke is the seventh studio album by American experimental rock band Oxbow. It was released on May 5, 2017 through Hydra Head Records.

== Background and composition ==
According to Pitchfork writer Zoe Camp, the album "envision[s] a world domineered by disorder, a carnivalesque arena where music's most intimidating, grandiose genres (free jazz, high-concept chamber pop, noise, neoclassical, metal) can duke it out like gladiators one minute, and come together for a grotesque group hug the next."

== Critical reception ==
Professional ratings
Aggregate scores
Source	Rating
Metacritic	87/100
Review scores
Source	Rating
Drowned in Sound	9/10
The Line of Best Fit	8/10
Louder Sound	4/5 stars
Mojo	4/5 stars
musicOMH	5/5 stars
Ox-Fanzine	4.5/5 stars
Pitchfork	7.3/10
Record Collector	5/5 stars
Tiny Mix Tapes	4.5/5 stars

Thin Black Duke was met with critical acclaim. The album received an average score of 87/100 from 9 reviews on Metacritic, indicating "universal acclaim". In a positive review with The Quietus, Sean Guthrie wrote, "By rights no group should be peaking after 30 years of making music together, yet that is the situation in which Oxbow find themselves. Will they ever transcend Thin Black Duke? Such are the ideas and attention to detail on this record, only a fool would bet against them." Zoe Camp of Pitchfork was positive on the album, but she did not see Thin Black Duke as Oxbow's "definitive show of force".

=== Accolades ===
Year	Publication	Country	Accolade	Rank
2017	Rolling Stone	United States	"20 Best Metal Albums of 2017"	7
2017	The Quietus	United Kingdom	"Albums of the Year, 2017"	10
2017	Decibel	United States	"Top 40 Albums of 2017"	30
2017	musicOMH	United Kingdom	"Top 50 Albums of 2017"	20
2017	Louder Than War	United Kingdom	"Top 100 Albums of 2017"	66
2017	The Observer	United Kingdom	"Observer readers' hidden musical gems of 2017"	-

== Track listing ==
All tracks are written by Oxbow.

No.	Title	Length
1.	"Cold & Well-Lit Place"	4:32
2.	"Ecce Homo"	4:17
3.	"A Gentleman's Gentleman"	3:24
4.	"Letter of Note"	6:17
5.	"Host"	5:23
6.	"The Upper"	4:32
7.	"Other People"	4:03
8.	"The Finished Line"	6:27
Total length:		38:59

== Personnel ==
Credits adapted from liner notes.

Oxbow

- Dan Adams – bass
- Greg Davis – drums, percussion
- Eugene Robinson – vocals
- Niko Wenner – guitars, vocals, keyboards, composition, arrangement, production

Additional musicians

- Philippe Thiphaine – additional guitars (1, 2)
- Kyle Bruckmann – oboe (4, 7, and 8)
- Oxbow Orchestra Eternal – 16-part brass and strings ensemble
- Marco d'Ambrosio – orchestra conductor

Technical personnel

- Aaron Turner – artwork, design
- Joe Chiccarelli – engineering, mixing, production
- Scott Bergstrom – second engineer
- Monte Vallier (with Ruminator Audio) – additional engineering, song arrangement consultation
- John Golden (with Golden Mastering) – vinyl mastering
- Emily Lazar (with The Lodge) – digital mastering
