= Balls in the Great Meat Grinder Collection =

The Balls in the Great Meat Grinder Collection

Compilation album by Oxbow
- Released: 1992
- Genre: Noise rock
- Length: 73:55
- Label: Pathological
- Producer: Oxbow

Oxbow chronology
King of the Jews (1991)	The Balls in the Great Meat Grinder Collection (1992)	Let Me Be a Woman (1995)

Professional ratings
Review scores
Source	Rating
Allmusic	2.5/5 stars

The Balls in the Great Meat Grinder Collection is an anthology by Oxbow, released in 1992 through Pathological Records. It collects the band's first two LPs, Fuckfest and King of the Jews, on a single CD.

== Track listing ==
All tracks are written by Oxbow.

No.	Title	Length
1.	"Daughter"	4:52
2.	"Bomb"	7:43
3.	"Angel"	8:38
4.	"Cat and Mouse"	6:13
5.	"Burn"	6:09
6.	"Woe"	5:54
7.	"Curse"	5:50
8.	"30 Miles"	5:47
9.	"The Valley"	5:50
10.	"Bull's Eye"	4:03
11.	"Yoke"	6:12
12.	"Hunger"	6:44

== Personnel ==
Musicians

- Dan Adams – bass guitar
- Greg Davis – drums, percussion
- Tom Dobrov – drums, percussion
- Eugene S. Robinson – vocals
- Niko Wenner – guitars, piano, bass guitar, production, arrangements

Recording

- Bart Thurber – recording
