= Raze =

Raze may refer to:

- Demolition
  - Slighting
- Raze, Haute-Saône, a town in France
- Raze (Underworld), a fictional character in the Underworld films
- Raze (magazine), a videogame magazine published by Newsfield Publications from 1990-1991
- Raze (film), a 2013 exploitation film
- "Raze", a character from 2020 videogame Valorant
- Raze (comics), a Marvel Comics character and Brotherhood of Mutants member

== Music ==
- Raze (house-music group)
- Raze (Christian pop group)
- "Raze", a song by Andy Hawkins from Halo, 1994
