= The Narcotic Story =

Studio album by Oxbow
- Released: June 19, 2007
- Studios: Record Plant (Sausalito, CA); San Francisco Soundworks (San Francisco, CA)
- Genres: Experimental rock; noise rock; art rock; blues rock
- Length: 45:35
- Label: Hydra Head
- Producers: Joe Chiccarelli, Niko Wenner

Oxbow chronology
| An Evil Heat (2002) | The Narcotic Story (2007) | Thin Black Duke (2017) |

The Narcotic Story is the sixth studio album by American experimental rock band Oxbow. It was their first to be released through Hydra Head Records and would be their last full-length album until Thin Black Duke, released a decade later. Co-produced by Joe Chiccarelli and band co-founder Niko Wenner, the album incorporates influences from blues rock and features orchestral music, arranged by Wenner.

== Content ==
Chris Morgan of Treble describes the album as "a post-modernist blues record. The music is complex and unpredictable at times but the direct emotional rawness of the most acid-tongued bluesmen is intact and very plainly laid bare like a dumped corpse on a dirt road. It’s hushed and thin but can fill the biggest space with claustrophobic dread in no time." The blues influence is also noted by Brain Howe of Pitchfork: "The Narcotic Story fully embraces a sort of slow-burning, infernal blues. It's a malign transmission, sparser than Oxbow's more metallic styles, and, paradoxically, much heavier." The "musical subtleties" of the album were highlighted by a Drowned in Sound critic: "Strings spill, weeping barroom pianos plink dolefully and the noise of Neurosis tuning up in Hell with razor-wire for plectrums is succeeded by a band becoming comfortable in their own skins; cohesive, essential, even accessible."

The lyrics tell the story of a character named Frank Johnson, "a downtrodden gent [...] lurching through the self-degrading shadows of life." Morgan described it as "a record of addiction and withdrawal, [...] it tells a decidedly unglamorous story of narcotics and whatever else Robinson’s characters go through." The album was initially conceived as the first part of a triptych with plans for a filmed adaptation. However, in 2017, the band stated that they had "over-promise[d]" and that the person who had been "filming some of the stuff" (who had also inspired "large portions" of the album) "just disappeared with the film."

== Release ==
The album was released through Hydra Head Records on CD and through Black Diamond on LP the following year.

== Reception ==
Professional ratings
Review scores
| Source | Rating |
|---|---|
| Alternative Press | 4/5 |
| Drowned in Sound | 9/10 |
| OndaRock | 8/10 |
| Pitchfork | 7.4/10 |
| Stylus | A− |

The album received highly positive reviews from many publications. Drowned in Sound considered it to be "2007's greatest LP". Scene Point Blank wrote that the album marked "another notch on the bedpost of the cash-burning, international horrorshow that is Oxbow, another chapter in one of modern music's most deranged and cathartic sagas." Aaron Turner (founder of Hydra Head Records and Isis front man) included the album among his "picks" and called it "a lesson in brutality, restraint, beauty and menace of endless suspense doled out in equal but unpredictable measure. While musical artists of all stripes regularly feign emotional energy through the mode of song craft, there are a slim few who have so purely channeled the human experience so tenderly and so forcefully as Oxbow have on The Narcotic Story."

=== Awards ===
Producer Joe Chiccarelli was nominated for a Grammy Award for Producer of the Year, Non-Classical for his work on The Narcotic Story alongside three other albums in 2008.

=== Accolades ===
Rock-A-Rolla magazine named it the best album of the year.

== Track listing ==
| No. | Title | Length |
|---|---|---|
| 1. | "Mr. Johnson" | 0:42 |
| 2. | "The Geometry of Business" | 4:11 |
| 3. | "Time, Gentlemen, Time" | 4:52 |
| 4. | "Down a Stair Backward" | 5:00 |
| 5. | "She's a Find" | 8:47 |
| 6. | "Frankly Frank" | 4:46 |
| 7. | "A Winner Every Time" | 4:52 |
| 8. | "Frank's Frolic" | 6:24 |
| 9. | "It's the Giving, Not the Taking" | 6:01 |
| Total length: | | 45:35 |

== Personnel ==
Adapted from Discogs.

- Art direction – Aaron Turner
- Bass – Dan Adams
- Bassoon – Jarratt Rossini
- Cello – Eric Gaenslen
- Clarinet – Leslie Tagorda
- Orchestral composition – Niko Wenner
- Conductor – Carlo Dean
- Photography direction – Gabriella Marks
- Drums, percussion – Greg Davis
- Engineering (second engineers) – Enrique Gonzales Muller, Jared Warner
- Engineering (second engineer), voice (track 1) – Loredana Crisan
- Flute – Diane Grubbe, MaryClare Brzytwa
- Guitars, keyboards, arranger, producer, additional engineering, music – Niko Wenner
- Mastering – J.J. Golden, John Golden
- Oboe – Jessica Boelter
- Oboe (oboe solos) – Kyle Bruckmann
- Other (photo locations) – Monte Vallier
- Production, mixing – Joe Chiccarelli
- Violin – Homer Hsu, Robin Sharp, Sam Smith (track 8)
- Vocals, lyrics – Eugene Robinson
