= Cyclotron (disambiguation) =

A cyclotron is a type of particle accelerator.

Cyclotron may also refer to:

- Cyclotron (album), a 1993 album by Blind Idiot God
- Cyclotron (character), two DC Comics characters
- The Cyclotron, a 2016 Canadian film
- Cyclotron, an unused 1997 Gladiators UK event
- Cyclotron (genus) an extinct arthropod belonging to Phosphatocopina

== See also ==
- List of accelerators in particle physics
- Category:Particle accelerators
