= An Evil Heat =

Studio album by Oxbow
- Released: March 19, 2002
- Recorded: 2001–2002
- Genre: Experimental rock; noise rock
- Length: 75:33
- Label: Neurot Recordings
- Producer: Gibbs Chapman, Niko Wenner

Oxbow chronology
Serenade in Red (1997)	An Evil Heat (2002)	The Narcotic Story (2007)

An Evil Heat is the fifth studio album by US experimental rock band Oxbow. Released in 2002 through Neurot Recordings, it was their first album in 5 years (the last one being Serenade in Red). The album is notable for the inclusion of "Shine (Glimmer)" which, at over 30 minutes in length, is the longest track in their discography.

== Content ==
Lyricist/vocalist Eugene S. Robinson has described the album as "a meditation on sex and power" (in comparison to Serenade in Red which he described as "a meditation on love"). Dave Pehling of SF Weekly called the album "a fever dream of sexual compulsion, pulverizing riffs, and droning feedback. Grappling with religious iconography and base desires, Robinson sings of a personal trinity ("the drunk, the reprobate, and the Holy Ghost") and then resolves to move beyond guilt: "Sorry ain't something I ever going to be sorry over/ It slows the sinning/ What with all that knee-bending."" He described the track "Shine (Glimmer)" as an "epic, near-psychedelic tune [...] Over half an hour long, the instrumental tour de force balances a pounding, Melvins-esque groove with a soothing wall of layered guitar-noise. This track features return of drummer Tom Dobrov playing with Gregg Davis in a dual drum attack." Pitchfork's Christopher Dare wrote that the track "builds in buzzing bass drones and dives back down into distortion, endlessly climaxing and clenching up and coming at you again. It's a primal jam, fueled by pure carnal libido [...]" He found many of the album's songs to be more "blues-based, at least at the beginning, as you're reeled in." William York of AllmMsic found the band's "trademark elements" to be "still in place" on the album ("the jagged-edged noise rock foundation, the bluesy/Led Zeppelin-ish overtones, and Eugene Robinson's squirming vocals (somewhere between a Baptist preacher and an unhappy two-year-old).") Roman Sokal of Exclaim! found the album to be "incredibly calculated" despite the fact that the music "may shift from music concrete to a stoner-type jam to pure insanity and madness" at "[a]ny time".

== Release ==
The album was initially issued in a Digipak with a clear tray and an 8-page booklet containing lyrics. In 2016, it was reissued in the US and Canada through the label Concrete Lo Fi Records as a double LP in two different editions: a translucent gold edition and a 180g vinyl edition.

== Reception ==
Professional ratings
Review scores
Source	Rating
AllMusic	4.5/5 stars
Pitchfork	8.1/10
Exclaim!	favorable

AllMusic wrote that "for a band who on paper might appear past their prime, it's a surprisingly good album. Actually, it's just really good, period. Compared to earlier albums like Fuckfest or King of the Jews, this album is much stronger in terms of how well the band uses dynamics and in how well the songs flow together. As a result, it stands up much better as a unified whole than those earlier releases." "In times past, Oxbow sounded somewhat like labelmates Neurosis, or a spoiled Birthday Party" writes Pitchfork, "An Evil Heat cools the fire just enough for a slower burn." They end by writing that the album "may not be for everyone, but you're going to keep an open ear-- it's been too long since you've listened to anything this hard." Exclaim! writes that the album sounds "incredibly calculated, making this bunch worthy of suspicion and wariness, which is the trait of any true artist." SF Weekly found it to be "a continuation of the band's exploration of the heart's dank tributaries."

Asked by Noisey to rank their own records, both Robinson and Wenner considered it to be their 3rd best.

=== Accolades ===
Terrorizer found it to be the 37th best album of the year.

== Track listing ==
No.	Title	Length
1.	"The Snake &..."	2:55
2.	"...The Stick"	3:37
3.	"S Bar X"	4:59
4.	"Stallkicker"	7:44
5.	"Sweetheart"	5:22
6.	"Sawmill"	5:32
7.	"Skin"	5:22
8.	"Sorry"	7:26
9.	"Shine (Glimmer)"	32:36
Total length:		75:33

== Personnel ==
- Bass, Hammond organ – Dan Adams
- Drums, percussion – Greg Davis
- Guitars, piano, reed organ, additional engineering – Niko Wenner
- Vocals – Eugene Robinson

== Credits ==
Adapted from Discogs:

- Art Direction [Uncredited] – Charles Hess
- Recording [Uncredited] – Gibbs Chapman (tracks: 1 to 8)
- Writing [Uncredited] – Oxbow
- Feature [The Choir Intransigent] [Uncredited] – Adam Cantwell, Fozzy Holdan, Joe Goldring, Monte Vallier, Tom Dobrov (track 9)
- Recording [Uncredited] – Bart Thurber (track 9)
- Feature [Uncredited] – Jarboe (track 4)
