= Tim Wyskida =

American musician

- Born: November 13, 1971 (age 54)
- Genres: Drone metal, math rock, noise rock, sludge metal
- Occupation: Musician
- Instrument: Drums
- Years active: 2000–present
- Labels: Hydra Head, Southern Lord
- Formerly of: Blind Idiot God, Jodis, Khanate, Khlyst

Tim Wyskida (born November 13, 1971) is an American drummer, most recognized for his work in the bands Khanate and Blind Idiot God.

== Biography ==
Tim Wyskida began playing drums at the age of twelve, learning jazz technique and composition.

In 2000, he joined the band Khanate, a drone metal project formed by Stephen O'Malley and James Plotkin. The same year, he joined the band Blind Idiot God, replacing Ted Epstein.

After releasing three albums Khanate disbanded in 2006, with its members pursuing separate musical endeavors. In 2009, Khanate's Clean Hands Go Foul was issued by Hydra Head.

Blind Idiot God released their fourth full-length album Before Ever After in February 2015, which comprised material recorded over the thirteen-year span since Wyskida joined.

== Discography ==
Year	Artist	Album	Label
2001	Khanate	Khanate	Southern Lord
2003	Khanate	Things Viral	Southern Lord
2005	Khanate	Capture & Release	Hydra Head
2006	Khlyst	Chaos Is My Name	Hydra Head
2009	Khanate	Clean Hands Go Foul	Hydra Head
2009	Jodis	Secret House	Hydra Head
2012	Jodis	Black Curtain	Hydra Head
2015	Blind Idiot God	Before Ever After	Invisible
2023	Khanate	To Be Cruel	Sacred Bones
