= Lo Flux Tube =

Studio album by OLD
- Released: 1991
- Genre: Industrial metal; avant-garde metal; death metal
- Length: 44:58
- Label: Earache
- Producer: James Plotkin, Steve Sisco

OLD chronology
Old Lady Drivers (1988)	Lo Flux Tube (1991)	The Musical Dimension of Sleastak (1993)

Lo Flux Tube is the second album by the band OLD. It marked a change in style for the band, abandoning their previous grindcore parody in favor of a much more industrial and experimental sound.

== Track listing ==
No.	Title	Length
1.	"Outlive"	3:49
2.	"Disconnect Self"	4:30
3.	"Citient Null"	6:06
4.	"Lo Flux Tube" (featuring John Zorn)	4:08
5.	"Vein Water"	4:24
6.	"Marzuraan"	5:04
7.	"Disassemble"	3:58
8.	"Z.U."	9:11
9.	"Outlive Again (Ganglehea Mix)"	3:48
Total length:		44:58

Japanese bonus track
No.	Title	Length
10.	"Life Improvisation/No Tech Mix"	11:00
Total length:		55:58

== Personnel ==
O.L.D.

- Alan Dubin - Vocals
- James Plotkin - Guitars, Programming
- Jason Everman - Bass

Guest musician

- John Zorn - Saxophone on "Lo Flux Tube"

Production

- Simon Curtis - Cover art
- Steve Sisco - Producer
- James Plotkin - Producer
