= Whipping Boy (American band) =

American punk/psychedelic/metal band

- Origin: Stanford, California, United States
- Genres: Hardcore Punk
- Years active: 1981–1989
- Past members: Eugene Robinson; Steve Ballinger; Adam Zimbardo; Dave Nagler; Sam Smoot; David Owens; Ron Isa; Steve Shaughnessy; Niko Wenner; Bart Thurber; Mark Nichoson; Dan Adams; Tom Dobrov

Whipping Boy was an American hardcore punk, psychedelic, and experimental metal band from Palo Alto, California, United States.

The band was created in 1981 by lead singer Eugene Robinson and guitarist Steve Ballinger, students from Stanford University, and rounded out by the rhythm section of Sam Smoot, and David Owens, also students. Their sound featured fast melodies, tight, chunky rhythms, and violently incoherent vocals. They espoused a radically anti-government view that caught the attention of the Dead Kennedys' Jello Biafra and led to his support. They were featured on a punk compilation Not So Quiet on the Western Front. Their first LP, The Sound of No Hands Clapping was produced by DK's bassist, Klaus Flouride. The band enjoyed moderate success, and national tours in 1982 and 1983 were capped by the release of the psychedelic MuruMuru in 1983. This abrupt change in style was not welcomed by Whipping Boy's fanbase. After another national tour, several personnel changes followed. In 1984, Ron Isa on bass, Steve Shaughnessy on drums, and Niko Wenner on guitar and backing vocals joined original members Robinson and Ballinger. Not long after, Ballinger left and Bart Thurber joined on guitar, though Ballinger appeared on the next LP The Third Secret of Fatima. This third record was another relative stylistic change, and also involved Fluoride. After several further lineup changes and a 7" record of a live-in-the-studio recording at radio station KFJC entitled "Crow," the band went on hiatus in 1989. Incendiary front man and lyricist Eugene Robinson, drummer Dan Adams, and guitarist Niko Wenner have shifted their focus to the avant-garde noise-rock band Oxbow.
