= The Musical Dimensions of Sleastak =

Studio album by OLD
- Released: 1993
- Genre: Industrial metal; avant-garde metal; post-metal; experimental rock
- Length: 66:24
- Label: Earache
- Producer: Jim Plotkin

OLD chronology
Lo Flux Tube (1991)	The Musical Dimensions of Sleastak (1993)	Formula (1995)

The Musical Dimensions of Sleastak is the third full-length album by the band OLD. It continues their melding of harsher industrial and experimental sounds. This is the last album of this loud, atonal style, which the band gives up on their next album, 1995's Formula. The album title is a reference to the Sleestak, the lizard-like antagonists in the 1974 TV series Land of the Lost. The single "Freak Now" was included on the soundtrack to the 1994 film Brainscan, as well as used in the movie. The tracks "A Beginning", "Two of Me (Parts One and Two)", and "Peri Cynthion" were also used in the film.

== Track listing ==
1. "A Beginning" - 2:08
2. "Two of Me (Parts One and Two)" - 8:04
3. "Freak Now" - 5:27
4. "Peri Cynthion" 10:11
5. "Happy Tantrum" - 5:30
6. "Creyap'nilla" 8:51
7. "Glitch" - 6:28
8. "Ebb" - 8:41
9. "Backwards Through the Greedo Compressor" - 11:05

== Credits ==
=== Cast of characters ===
- Alan Dubin (voice & voice effects)
- Jimmy Plotkin (guitars, keyboards, programming)
- Herschel Gaer (bass)
