= Seventh Rule Recordings =

- Founded: 2003
- Founder: Scott Flaster, Cara Flaster
- Genre: Heavy metal, experimental rock, noise rock, post-punk
- Country of origin: United States
- Location: Portland, Oregon, Chicago, Illinois
- Official website: http://www.seventhrule.com

Seventh Rule Recordings is a record label based in Portland, Oregon that formed in 2003 to release underground metal and noise rock. Founded by Scott and Cara Flaster, who still operate the label today, they have released albums by bands such as Akimbo, Buried at Sea, Indian, Author and Punisher and Sweet Cobra.

== Bands that are/have been on Seventh Rule ==
- Akimbo
- Atriarch
- Author and Punisher
- Batillus
- Buried At Sea
- Coffinworm
- Diesto
- Eight Bells
- Ephemeros
- Gnaw
- Graves at Sea
- Indian
- Light Yourself on Fire
- Lord Mantis
- Millions
- Plague Bringer
- Raise the Red Lantern
- Sheenjek
- Sweet Cobra
- The Makai
- Thoughts of Ionesco
- Wetnurse
- Wizard Rifle

== See also ==
- List of record labels
