= Blind Idiot God =

American instrumental rock band

- Also known as: B.I.G.
- Origin: St. Louis, Missouri, United States
- Genres: Noise rock, math rock, dub
- Years active: 1982–1996, 2001–present
- Labels: Avant, Enemy, Indivisible, SST
- Members: Will Dahl; Andy Hawkins; Tim Wyskida
- Past members: Ted Epstein; Gabriel Katz

Blind Idiot God is an American instrumental rock trio formed in 1982 in St. Louis, Missouri, United States, by guitarist Andy Hawkins, bassist Gabriel Katz and drummer Ted Epstein. The phrase "blind idiot god" comes from horror writer H. P. Lovecraft's description of the fictional entity Azathoth.

Their often improvisational musical style combines influences from punk rock, noise music, 20th-century classical music, heavy metal, dub, free jazz, and funk. They are based in New York City as of 2014 and have often collaborated with musicians Bill Laswell and John Zorn.

Their self-titled debut album, Blind Idiot God, was issued by SST Records in 1987 and was well received critically. Brian Olewnick described it as "an extraordinary debut [...] the three musicians exhibited startling originality and impressive technique both on their instruments and in the depth and style of their compositions". With bassist Bill Laswell handling production duties, Undertow was released in 1988 and was followed by Cyclotron in 1992. Ted Epstein left the band in 1996, and the remaining members put Blind Idiot God on hiatus as they searched for his replacement.

In 2001, Blind Idiot God reunited after roughly a decade of inactivity, with Tim Wyskida (of Khanate) replacing Epstein. Between 2008 and 2010, they recorded new material at studios in New Jersey (Barber Shop and Orange Sound), which comprised their fourth album, Before Ever After. Gabriel Katz recorded bass tracks for the album, but departed in 2012 due to hearing problems and chronic tendonitis. He was replaced by New York veteran bassist Will Dahl, making Andy Hawkins the only original member. Before Ever After was released on February 24, 2015, with the new lineup performing three live shows in New York to coincide with its release. In 2017, The band announced they would be re-issuing their back catalog on multiple formats, and were also working on a new album.

== History ==
=== Early years (1982–1986) ===
Blind Idiot God was formed in 1982 in St. Louis, Missouri when its members were teenagers. Before adopting free jazz and dub influences, they essentially played hardcore punk, with their songs being roughly one minute in length. During this time, they socialized within the St. Louis hardcore scene, including members of Drunks with Guns and Ultraman. After failing to find a vocalist that shared their musical aspirations, the band opted to continue as an instrumental outfit. Their first live performance came in September 1983 at a basement party. After playing the first song of their set, a reggae version of "Hava Nagila", they were interrupted by the police who shut the party down after receiving complaints from the neighbors. After hearing their self-produced cassette demo, Greg Ginn of Black Flag signed them to SST Records, and the band moved to Brooklyn in 1986.

=== Debut album and critical acclaim (1987–1988) ===
"Wise Man Dub" (1987)
"Wise Man Dub" (Blind Idiot God) is one of Blind Idiot God's dub influenced compositions

The band began searching for a producer who would be willing to work with their mixture of noise, dub and heavy metal. Originally, Hawkins wanted to enlist the aid of British producer Adrian Sherwood, known for his work with numerous reggae groups as well as his contributions to the industrial hip hop ensemble Tackhead. In January 1987, Blind Idiot God entered B.C. Studios to record with producer Martin Bisi, who they had met through composer Bill Laswell. Their debut album, the eponymously titled Blind Idiot God, was released on SST Records in 1987 and received critical acclaim. While generally categorized as heavy metal and noise rock, the music also hinted at free jazz and European classical music influences, with its final three tracks showing strong influence from the dub genre. The virtuosity of the band's players was praised in an article for Electronic Musician, which said "Andy Hawkins' guitar dips and swirls, chases its tail, and ultimately screams its existence, while Ted Epstein and Gabriel Katz lend form and substance on bass and drums respectively. At 19, 20, and 21, the trio is young enough to dazzle with potential. Jazz, heavy metal, reggae, art music - B.I.G. has elements of all of these, yet establishes their very own recipe."

=== Underground success and second album (1988–1992) ===
"Purged Specimen" (1988)
"Purged Specimen" (Undertow), showcases the band's mix of jazz, funk and noise rock with accompaniment by saxophonist John Zorn

The success of Blind Idiot God's first album coupled with powerful live performances earned them recognition in underground music circles. The band soon began collaborating with avant-garde composer and saxophonist John Zorn. Zorn contacted the band after attending one of their performances at CBGB's and professed his enthusiasm for their work along with his desire to collaborate with the group. The band joined him onstage on numerous occasions to perform improvised music, Zorn compositions and even in his John Coltrane cover band "Ascension" which featured infamous 2 minute versions of Coltrane compositions like A Love Supreme and Ascension.

The Blind Idiot God's second album Undertow was issued the following year by Enemy Records and produced by Bill Laswell. The style remained similar to what had been represented on the band's debut, with excursions into dub territory interposing bludgeoning noise rock. Noted musical departures included the heavy metal/funk hybrid "Alice in My Fantasies", a George Clinton cover, and "Purged Specimen", a short piece composed for them by John Zorn that also featured him on alto saxophone. Praising the Blind Idiot God's knack for memorable melodies and rapid tempo-changes combined with Laswell's production, EAR Magazine declared Undertow superior to their debut and "as addictive as a pot of strong coffee."

=== Third album and hiatus (1992–1996) ===
"Thunderhead" (1992)
30 second sample of "Thunderhead" from the band's third album Cyclotron.

Released four years later, the band's 1992 album Cyclotron was seen by some as lackluster due to the reliance on ideas previously explored and absence of distinct experimentation. In 1993, Blind Idiot God and Henry Rollins wrote and recorded the title song for the movie Freaked, marking the first and only time the band collaborated with a vocalist. The entire band performed on Praxis' album Sacrifist, released in 1993.

After Cyclotron was released, the members began pursuing their own separate musical endeavors. Andy Hawkins began a solo guitar project named Azonic, under which he released Halo in 1994 and Skinner's Black Laboratories with Justin Broadrick of Godflesh in 1995. Gabriel Katz collaborated with Bill Laswell on Dub Terror Exhaust, for which he composed music and contributed bass parts. In 1996, Ted Epstein left the band to pursue other interests. Unwilling to continue without a drummer, the remaining members placed Blind Idiot God on hiatus.

=== Return and new album (2001–present) ===
Drummer Tim Wyskida, known for his work in Khanate, joined in 2001 and Blind Idiot God began work on their fourth studio album. However, setbacks and delays occurred as Gabriel Katz encountered problems with tendinitis and hearing loss. The line-up finally began performing in a live setting in 2006, playing a series of well-received gigs in New York City. In 2012, Gabriel Katz left the band and was replaced by Will Dahl.

In 2013, three newly recorded tracks appeared in the HBO documentary Downloaded, a film by Alex Winter detailing the history of Napster. It marked the first time new material by Blind Idiot God had been made available to the public in over twenty years. The band's fourth full-length album, an accumulation of thirteen years worth of recorded material, was announced in 2014. Titled Before Ever After, it was the debut release of Indivisible Music, a label founded by Andy Hawkins. Before Ever After was issued on vinyl on February 24, 2015, followed by a Compact Disc release on April 6, 2015.

On April 13, 2016 the Blind Idiot God embarked on their "Raise the Titanic" tour, which marked the band's first live shows outside of the United States. Concurrent with their tour, Before Ever After was reissued for worldwide distribution. In 2017, the band announced the re-issue of their second album Undertow. Set to be released on October 13, the newly remastered release is to include two versions of "Freaked", a collaboration with former Black Flag vocalist Henry Rollins and Blind Idiot God's sole composition to feature vocals. They also announced plans to re-issue Cyclotron.

== Musical style ==
Though at its core heavy metal, Blind Idiot God's music is informed by punk rock, dub, and classical music composers, notably György Ligeti, Krzysztof Penderecki and Igor Stravinsky. In a 1997 Guitar Player interview, Hawkins explained one reason he drew inspiration from classical music was to use more advanced harmony: "When I listen to a lot of metal and hard rock, I think 'Great Intensity! Boring chords!'" The band's music also heavily drew from free jazz, with its members citing Cecil Taylor, Ornette Coleman and John Coltrane as being early musical influences. Former drummer Ted Epstein has also commented on the role funk music plays in his music, saying "something that has been with me since I was 15 or 16 is the idea of funk as a concept, the syncopation and the push/pull thing that exists in funk, embodied in Funkadelic, Grandmaster Flash, Sly and the Family Stone, and The Meters." Comparisons have also been made to Blue Cheer, Last Exit, the Sex Pistols, Glenn Branca and Jimi Hendrix. In reviewing the band's debut, a critic of Electronic Musician noted that "if you took original Hendrix multi-track tapes, wiped the vocals off, and handed them to Scientist, the reggae dub-mixer, the result might sound like B.l.G."

Since its inception, Blind Idiot God's music has been entirely instrumental, with its members stating their unanimous disinterest with incorporating vocals into their arrangements. Andy Hawkins has explained "when you hear a voice, it usually has such a distinct emotional quality to it. It speaks in a whole different kind of way then the music does, so it just interferes with what we are trying to do musically." However, during the early nineties the band expressed a desire to form a separate project that integrated vocals into their music.

=== Legacy ===
Filmmaker and actor Alex Winter is a long-time admirer of Blind Idiot God, having used their music in his debut feature film Freaked and again in his 2013 documentary Downloaded. In 2014 he described them as "one of the most revered and influential bands to come out of the SST era [...] they are as great and bold today, as ever." Former Black Flag vocalist Henry Rollins professed himself as being a fan of their work and felt honored in having collaborated with them.

== Band members ==
Current members

- Will Dahl – bass guitar (2012–present)
- Andy Hawkins – guitar (1982–1996, 2001–present)
- Tim Wyskida – drums (2001–present)

Former members

- Ted Epstein – drums (1982–1996)
- Gabriel Katz – bass guitar (1982–1996, 2001–2012)

Timeline

== Discography ==
Studio albums

- Blind Idiot God (SST, 1987)
- Undertow (Enemy, 1988)
- Cyclotron (Avant, 1992)
- Before Ever After (Indivisible, 2015)

EPs

- Purged Specimen (Enemy, 1989)
- Sawtooth (Enemy, 1989)
