= Rift.Canyon.Dreams =

EP by Burning Witch
- Released: 1998
- Recorded: 1997
- Studio: Robert Lang (Shoreline, Washington)
- Genre: Doom metal
- Length: 35:05
- Label: Merciless Records

Burning Witch chronology
Towers... (1998)	Rift.Canyon.Dreams (1998)	Crippled Lucifer (2001)

Rift.Canyon.Dreams is the second EP by the U.S. doom metal band Burning Witch. It was originally released in 1998 on Merciless Records, to a limited distribution of 500 copies. It is available on the compilation Crippled Lucifer (Seven Psalms for Our Lord of Light), through Southern Lord Records.

== Track listing ==
1. "Warning Signs" – 8:22
2. "Stillborn" – 11:57
3. "History of Hell (Crippled Lucifer)" – 6:03
4. "Communion" – 8:43

== Personnel ==
- Stephen O'Malley – guitar
- G. Stuart Dahlquist – bass
- B.R.A.D. – drums
- Edgy 59 – vocals
