= Not So Quiet on the Western Front (album) =

Compilation album by various artists
- Released: 1982
- Genre: Hardcore punk
- Label: Alternative Tentacles
- Producer: Various

Professional ratings
Review scores
Source	Rating
Allmusic	4/5 stars
Sounds	3/5 stars

Not So Quiet on the Western Front is a punk rock and hardcore punk compilation double LP, compiled by Maximum Rocknroll and released by Alternative Tentacles in 1982. It documented the Northern California and Nevada punk scenes. It was re-released on CD in 1999.

== Track listing ==
1. "Intensified Chaos" by Intensified Chaos (0:56)
2. "Their Mistakes" by Social Unrest (2:26)
3. "Dan with the Mellow Hair" by Naked Lady Wrestlers (2:20)
4. "Holocaust" by M.A.D. (1:03)
5. "Rich Plastic People" by Killjoy (1:44)
6. "Fun with Acid" by Fang (2:07)
7. "El Salvador" by Capitol Punishment (1:11)
8. "Collapse" by Ribsy (0:48)
9. "Annihilation" by Crucifix (1:13)
10. "I Don't Wanna Die for My Country" by Square Cools (1:30)
11. "Pay Salvation" by Los Olvidados (2:06)
12. "What Price Will You Pay?" by Code Of Honor (1:58)
13. "Fuck Your Amerika" by 7 Seconds (0:49)
14. "Race War" by Unaware(1:35)
15. "Turmoil" by Frigidettes (2:05)
16. "Don't Conform" by 5th Column (1:30)
17. "Shrunken Heads" by Ghost Dance (2:35)
18. "A Child and His Lawn Mower" by Dead Kennedys (0:55)
19. "All I Know" by Rebel Truth (1:10)
20. "Learning Process" by Pariah (2:01)
21. "Reagum" by Lennonburger (1:11)
22. "Praise the Lord & Pass The Ammunition" by (Impatient)Youth (2:27)
23. "GDMFSOB" by Bad Posture (1:31)
24. "Assassination Attempt" by Demented Youth (1:22)
25. "The Only Good Cop..." by MDC (0:58)
26. "The Few, the Proud, the Dead" by Karnage (0:40)
27. "Scare" by Domino Theory (1:20)
28. "Dead Porker" by NBJ (3:03)
29. "Human Farm" by Whipping Boy (1:07)
30. "Worker Bee" by Angst (0:54)
31. "Premature Enlistment" by Free Beer (1:57)
32. "Sacrifice" by Flipper (4:35)
33. "No One Listens" by Vengeance (2:00)
34. "S/M Nightmare" by Juvinel Justice (1:49)
35. "Fat, Drunk, & Stupid" by Section 8 (0:51)
36. "Libyan Hit Squad" by Tongue Avulsion (1:02)
37. "Off to War" by Maniax (3:31)
38. "Strike Out" by Vicious Circle (0:38)
39. "Breakout" by UXB (1:42)
40. "Shitcan" by Scapegoats (1:13)
41. "The Oven Is My Friend" by Church Police (2:40)
42. "Systems Suck" by Deadly Reign (1:31)
43. "Dead Men Tell No Tales" by No Alternative (2:03)
44. "Punk Is An Attitude" by Wrecks (1:10)
45. "SLT" by Urban Assault (1:31)
46. "No More Riots" by Bent Nails (2:49)
47. "New Left" by M.I.A. (0:44)

== See also ==
- List of punk compilation albums
