= Things Viral =

2003 album by Khanate

Studio album by Khanate
- Released: October 6, 2003
- Recorded: 2002–2003
- Genre: Drone metal
- Length: 59:41
- Label: Southern Lord Records (SUNN28)
- Producer: James Plotkin

Khanate chronology
| Khanate (2001) | Things Viral (2003) | Capture & Release (2005) |

Professional ratings
Review scores
| Source | Rating |
|---|---|
| AllMusic | link |
| Pitchfork | (8.2/10) |
| The Quietus | – |
| Visions Magazine | 9/12 stars |

Things Viral is the second album by American drone metal band Khanate, released in 2003 on the Southern Lord label.

The CD was released in two versions: a European digipack version and a U.S. jewelcase version. There was also an LP version on LOAD Records with 1000 gatefold plus 12" copies released.

A video was made for the song "Dead".

== Track listing ==
=== CD tracks ===
- All Songs Written & Arranged By Khanate. (Copyright Ideologic Organ)
1. "Commuted" – 19:13
2. "Fields" – 19:50
3. "Dead" – 9:27
4. "Too Close Enough To Touch" – 11:11

=== LP tracks ===
1. "Commuted"
2. "Fields"
3. "Too Close Enough To Touch"
4. "Commuted (coda)"

== Personnel ==
- Alan Dubin: Vocal
- Stephen O'Malley: Guitars
- James Plotkin: Bass, Keyboards, Synthesizers
- Tim Wyskida: Drums, Percussion

== Production ==
- Produced, Recorded, Engineered & Mixed By James Plotkin
