= Mr. Peter Hayden =

Finnish band

- PH monogram

Background information
- Also known as: PH (2015–2021), ENPHIN (2021–present). Less official variations include enPHin, MPH, MRPH and Mr. Peter Hayden Band.
- Origin: Kankaanpää, Finland
- Genres: Post-metal; doom metal; post-rock; psychedelic rock; space rock; synthwave
- Years active: 2000–present
- Labels: Svart Records, Pelagic Records
- Members: Jussi-Pekka Koivisto; Lauri Kivelä; Joakim Udd; Vesa Vatanen
- Past members: Simo Kuosmanen; Mikko Marjamäki; Touko Santamaa; Vesa Ajomo
- Website: www.mrph.net, www.enphin.net

Mr. Peter Hayden (or PH and later ENPHIN) is a Finnish alternative metal band often filed under post-metal, space rock or psychedelic doom. The band was formed in Kankaanpää, Finland in 2000. On their fourth album, Eternal Hayden, the band began to refer to themselves just by their logo, the PH-monogram, leading to confusion what the band should be called. Since then all variations from Mr. Peter Hayden to PH have been used, including ENPHIN (or enPHin) after release of their sixth album End Cut in 2022. The group is also part of the Wastement collective.

== History ==
The year 2006 marked the first official release in form of a 7-inch record, First Cycle Complete. Next few years were spent touring with Galacticka. This co-operation later introduced a shared release, 10-inch split record.

The debut album Faster Than Speed was released in August 2010. The two-song album was dived deep into the concept of time and personal perceptions of it. The album was praised for its boldness in dodging every established genre definition, which made the record sound unique. Two years later in May 2012, their second full-length album Born a Trip followed, this time consisting of one track clocking over an hour. Praising feedback continued and more international recognition resulted a European tour and their first visit to Roadburn Festival the following year. Next year, in 2014, Mr. Peter Hayden finished their first album trilogy by releasing giant double album, consisting of one song divided on two CDs. Archdimension Now was released in Spring 2014 and was followed by another European tour, this time with Dark Buddha Rising. Later on summer the album's release tour was completed with various appearances on major festivals in Finland, including Tuska Open Air, Provinssirock and Flow Festival. In 2014 the band released also the seven-inch vinyl We Fly High. This single did differ from the first three albums and gave an idea what would happen later on. It took almost three years of work and one-off gigs (including their second time in Roadburn Festival) before Mr. Peter Hayden released their fourth album Eternal Hayden, their first on Svart Records. The album consisted of five songs and was shorter than any of their earlier ones, but the sound was still described as unique, shoegaze, space rock, heavy psychedelia and krautrock being mentioned. On this album, the group declared that from now on they will refer to themselves only by their PH monogram insignia, leading into confusion what the band should be called. In 2017, the band toured Finland in support of album, their only international show being the Roskilde Festival in Denmark.

In August 2019 Svart Records announced that PHs's fifth album Osiris Hayden will be released on 1 November on vinyl and CD. First single Justified was released on 30 August. On 4 October second single Origo was released and previewed by Decibel Magazine: "PH take in, twist about, fold over, and plot anew jazz, rock, metal, ambient, and others as a way to map out their next steps, whether its by song, such as “Origo,” or by album, Osiris Hayden." In 2020 all tours and festival appearances supporting the album release were canceled or rescheduled and band moved back to studio to work on their next album.

In April 2021 as part of Roadburn Festival's online edition it was announced that the band would be moving on from using the PH-moniker and would begin working with Pelagic Records as enPHin. In March 2022 first piece of music under the ENPHIN moniker was released as Cut Flesh, first single from End Cut, was released on digital platforms. At the same time Pelagic Records announced that sixth album will be released in June. Two other singles were released during April and May, with latter The Non-returners accompanied with a music video. Reviews of End Cut noted groups' ongoing progress mentioning genres as experimental Rock, darksynth, electro-goth/-industria, triphop and electronic body music describing the new album. In June 2023 Pelagic Records released Re-cut a remix album based solely on End Cut material. Album featured Finnish electronic music artists, side projects and members of other Wastement-bands.

In 2024 and 2025, members of ENPHIN were involved in several other musical projects. Jussi-Pekka Koivisto released a debut album with Harhala in 2024, while Lauri Kivelä and Vesa Vatanen collaborated with JJ Koczan on Alitila's debut album Spruce (2025). In May 2025, Kivelä and Koivisto, together with former PH member Vesa Ajomo and drummer Lassi Männikkö, released Pyhä kuilu, the debut album of their avant-garde doom metal band Entheomorphosis, through Svart Records. The band made its live debut at the Sonic Rites festival in Helsinki on 23 May 2025.

== Members ==
=== Current members ===
- Lauri Kivelä – bass (2000–present), vocals (2006–2007)
- Jussi-Pekka Koivisto – guitar (2009–present), vocals (2017–present), drums (2022–present)
- Joakim Udd – synthesizer (2018–present)

=== Former members ===
- Mikko Marjamäki – drums (2000–2011)
- Simo Kuosmanen – guitar (2000–2013), vocals (2004–2007), synthesizer (2007–2013)
- Vesa Vatanen – guitar (2001–2025), vocals (2001–2009, 2013–2014, 2017–2025), piano (2001–2007), effects (2012–2025)
- Touko Santamaa – percussion (2005–2011), drums (2011–2018)
- Vesa Ajomo – synthesizer (2013–2018)

== Discography ==
=== Faster Than Speed (2010) ===
2010 CD (Winter Records), 2012 2LP (Mikrofoni)

No.	Title	Length
1.	"Smoke in Space"	33:33
2.	"Δt=0"	33:00
Total length:		66:33

=== Born a Trip (2012) ===
2012 CD (Kauriala Society), 2013 2LP (Mikrofoni)

No.	Title	Length
1.	"Born a Trip"	68:20
Total length:		68:20

=== Archdimension Now (2014) ===
2014 2CD (Kauriala Society)

Disc one

No.	Title	Length
1.	"Archdimension Now (Disc 1)"	67:47
Total length:		67:47

Disc two

No.	Title	Length
1.	"Archdimension Now (Disc 2)"	57:58
Total length:		57:58

=== Eternal Hayden (2017) ===
2017 CD/LP (Svart Records)

No.	Title	Length
1.	"Looking Back at Mr. Peter Hayden"	16:44
2.	"We Fly High"	7:13
3.	"Reach"	4:34
4.	"Higher"	3:50
5.	"Rock and Roll Future"	4:00
Total length:		36:21

=== Osiris Hayden (2019) ===
2019 CD/LP (Svart Records)

No.	Title	Length
1.	"Thr33 of Wands"
2.	"Emergence"
3.	"Justified"
4.	"Uhrilahja"
5.	"Sun Sets for One"
6.	"Origo"
7.	"Ad Coronam"
8.	"M47eria Prima"
9.	"Tachophonia"
Total length:		47:00

=== End Cut (2022) ===
2022 CD/2LP (Pelagic Records)

No.	Title	Length
1.	"An Nihilist"
2.	"Communion"
3.	"The Test View"
4.	"Perpetual Night"
5.	"Kaiverrus"
6.	"Moth"
7.	"Cut Flesh"
8.	"Dear Low Star"
9.	"Protocosmic"
10.	"Drones"
11.	"The Non-returners"
12.	"Nothing"
13.	"Sang Unity"
14.	"Raunioina"
15.	"Endling"

=== Other releases ===
- 2006 First Cycle Complete, 7" (Post-rock Cafe Hietakulma)
- 2008 Orbit:Orbit, 10" split with Galacticka (Verilinja, Waste of Space)
- 2011 This Was Mr. Peter Hayden, MC live (Rabbit Ilsn Records)
- 2014 We Fly High, 7" (Mikrofoni, Rämekuukkeli, Doognad Records)
