= Chaos Is My Name =

Chaos is My Name

Studio album by Khlyst
- Released: October 24, 2006
- Recorded: December 2004–December 2005
- Genres: Drone doom, avant-garde metal, dark ambient
- Length: 42:55
- Label: Hydra Head Records
- Producer: James Plotkin

Chaos is My Name is the debut album by the drone doom band Khlyst. Stephen Kasner did the artwork for the album.

== Track listing ==
1. "I" – 2:44
2. "II" – 7:50
3. "III" – 1:45
4. "IV" – 2:00
5. "V" – 3:53
6. "VI" – 7:13
7. "VII" – 6:16
8. "VIII" – 4:53

== Personnel ==
- Runhild Gammelsæter - voice
- James Plotkin - guitar, laptop
- Tim Wyskida - drums, gong
