= Sacrifist =

Studio album by Praxis
- Released: 1994
- Genre: Dub, avant-garde metal, noise rock, hip hop
- Length: 44:41
- Label: Subharmonic
- Producer: John T. Matarazzo on the reissue

Praxis chronology
A Taste of Mutation (1992)	Sacrifist (1994)	Metatron (1994)

Professional ratings
Review scores
Source	Rating
Allmusic	3/5 stars

Sacrifist is the second album by Bill Laswell's experimental music project Praxis, released in 1993 on Laswell's label Subharmonic. Originally, the album was intended to be a Rammellzee project, but soon was converted into the second Praxis album, after suggestions made by John Zorn.

The line-up features the core Praxis trio of Laswell, guitarist Buckethead and drummer Brain. Additionally, Bootsy Collins and Bernie Worrell (of Parliament-Funkadelic), both also featured on the debut album, return for one lengthy track each: "Deathstar" includes Collins' "free-form bass explorations" and "Crossing" features Worrell's "psychedelic improvisation on a distorted Hammond organ". Vocals are handled by Mick Harris from Napalm Death and Scorn as well as Yamatsuka Eye from Boredoms. Saxophonist John Zorn and the members of dub band Blind Idiot God are also featured.

The music on the album is a mix of noisy speed/thrash metal with short interludes of dub music and hip-hop and samples of other media, namely the 1989 Japanese horror film Tetsuo: The Iron Man.

== Different pressings ==
Some CD pressings of the album have all the songs as one track in a somewhat lower sound quality and parts of the last track are missing. This reissue can be easily identified by looking at the back cover, which has the name of producer John T. Matarazzo listed.

== Track listing ==
No.	Title	Writer(s)	Length
1.	"Stronghold"	Bill Laswell	1:34
2.	"Cold Rolled/Iron Dub"	Andy Hawkins, Bill Laswell	6:22
3.	"Suspension"	Bill Laswell	2:19
4.	"Rivet"	Buckethead, Bill Laswell	5:23
5.	"Deathstar"	Bootsy Collins	9:47
6.	"The Hook"	Bill Laswell, John Zorn	6:17
7.	"Nine Secrets"	Bill Laswell	3:16
8.	"Crossing"	Bill Laswell	9:43

== Personnel ==
- Praxis:
  - Buckethead - guitar
  - Brain - drums
  - Bootsy Collins - bass and vocals
  - Ted Epstein - drums
  - Yamatsuka Eye - vocals
  - Mick Harris - vocals
  - Andy Hawkins - guitar
  - Gabriel Katz - bass
  - Bill Laswell - bass
  - Bernie Worrell - keyboards
  - John Zorn - saxophone
