= Sweet Cobra =

American post-hardcore band from Chicago

- Origin: Chicago, Illinois, United States
- Genres: Post-hardcore, stoner rock, post-punk, alternative rock, noise-rock, post metal
- Years active: 2003-present
- Labels: Black Market Activities, Hawthorne Street Records, Seventh Rule Recordings
- Members: Timothy Botchy Remis; Robert Arthur Lanham Jr. Jason Gagovski
- Past members: Neeraj Kane; Matthew Allen Arluck

Sweet Cobra is an American post-hardcore band from Chicago, Illinois, United States.

== Members ==
- Timothy Botchy Remis – bass and vocals
- Robert Arthur Lanham Jr. – guitar
- Jason Gagovski – drums and cymbals

== Selected discography ==
=== Studio albums ===
- Praise (Seventh Rule Recordings, 2003)
- Forever (Hawthorne Street Records, 2007)
- Mercy (Black Market Activities, 2010)
- Earth (Magic Bullet Records, 2015)
- Threes (Hawthorne Street Records, 2022)

=== Splits ===
- Doomriders & Sweet Cobra: Are We Not Men? 7" (split with Doomriders) (2012, Hawthorne Street Records)
- Sweet Cobra / Get Rad 7" (split with Get Rad) (2014, Hawthorne Street, Lifeline, Underground Communique)
- Young Widows & Sweet Cobra Live at Three Floyds Brewing 12" (split with Young Widows) (2018, Hawthorne Street Records)

=== EPs ===
- Bottom Feeder (Seventh Rule Recordings, 2009)

=== Music videos ===
- "Future Ghosts" (2015)
- "Repo" (2016)
