= Akimbo (band) =

American hardcore punk band

- Origin: Seattle, Washington
- Genres: Hardcore punk
- Years active: 1998–2012
- Labels: Neurot Recordings, Alternative Tentacles, Seventh Rule Recordings
- Members: Jon Weisnewski; Nat Damm; Aaron Walters
- Past members: Kyle Iman; Jared Burke Eglington; Chuck Rowell; Dustin Brown; Demian Johnston; Patrick Cunningham; Stacy Schrag

Akimbo was an American indie band from Seattle, Washington.

The band was founded by its two original members, Jon Weisnewski (bass, vocals) and Nat Damm (drums). The two met in 1995 in a high school gym class after noticing each other's home-made punk T-shirts. They quickly became friends, sharing a love of DC hardcore and punk rock. Akimbo played its first show on Halloween of 1998.

Akimbo has had eleven guitarists over the course of its existence. The first, Kyle Iman, was featured on two albums: a split 10-inch with Seattle's Teen Cthulhu, and a 7-inch released in 1999 entitled An Army of Evil Robots Programmed for Human Destruction (Rock and Roleplay records).

Iman was replaced in 2000 by full-time guitarist Jared Burke Eglington. "Burke", as he is known by friends, served the band from 2000 to 2006, and is featured on several records. It was with him that Akimbo developed what would come to be known as their signature sound.

The constraints of Eglington's career as a financial analyst caused the band to enlist the help of several part-time guitarists to fill out their lineup for their rigorous touring schedule. Among these guitarists are Chuck Rowell, Dustin Brown (featured on City of the Stars), Demian Johnston (of Playing Enemy), Patrick Cunningham (featured on Forging Steel and Laying Stone), and Stacy Schrag (a notable fixture of the Southern Oregon hardcore scene).

In 2006, Aaron Walters was recruited to join Akimbo for a ten-day West Coast tour. Shortly thereafter, he accompanied the band on a month-long tour of the US. His collaboration with the band eventually led to his replacement of Eglington as Akimbo's sole guitarist.

In 2005, Akimbo was approached by punk artist Jello Biafra after opening for him and Melvins. The next year, they released Forging Steel and Laying Stone on Biafra's Alternative Tentacles label. In 2007, the same label released Navigating the Bronze, which was the band's first recording with Aaron Walters on guitar.

After a show with Converge and Neurosis, Akimbo was asked by members of Neurosis to join Neurot Recordings' roster. Neurot, owned by Neurosis guitarist-singer Steve Von Till, released Akimbo's most critically acclaimed album entitled Jersey Shores in October 2008.

Jersey Shores is a concept album inspired by a series of mysterious shark attacks which occurred on the beaches of New Jersey in 1916. It showed a substantial deviation in style from previous recordings, which can be attributed to the band's intentional creation of a "cohesive piece of music" as opposed to a collection of separate tracks, as well as a natural progression of their sound.

The band broke up in 2012 after the departure of guitarist Aaron Walters, with the remaining members deciding not to continue. Jon and Nat now play in Sandrider. Burke plays in X Suns. Weisnewski also hosts the podcast Tomorrow We Die, with Jeff McNulty of Bloodhag.

== Members ==
- Jon Weisnewski - Bass, Vocals
- Nat Damm - Drums
- Aaron Walters - Guitar

== Selected discography ==
- An Army of Evil Robots Programmed for Human Destruction (Rock and Roleplay records, 1999)
- Harshing Your Mellow (CD - Dopamine records / Vinyl - Seventh Rule Recordings, 2001)
- Elephantine (CD - Dopamine records / Vinyl - Seventh Rule Recordings, 2003)
- City of the Stars (Seventh Rule Recordings, 2004)
- Forging Steel and Laying Stone (Alternative Tentacles, 2006)
- Navigating the Bronze (Alternative Tentacles, 2007)
- Jersey Shores (Neurot Recordings, 2008)
- Live to Crush (Alternative Tentacles, 2013)
