= Formula (album) =

Studio album by OLD
- Released: October 24, 1995
- Genre: Industrial rock; electronic rock; experimental rock; post-rock
- Length: 50:06
- Label: Earache
- Producer: Bruce Hathaway, James Plotkin

OLD chronology
The Musical Dimension of Sleastak (1993)	Formula (1995)

Formula (released 1995) is an album by industrial/metal band OLD (Old Lady Drivers). It is their last full-length to date, and the group was condensed to a duo, with James Plotkin handling all instruments and Alan Dubin handling all vocals.

The album is a rather drastic departure from OLD's earlier works, abandoning much of their extreme metal roots to instead explore techno, IDM and electro, with Dubin's vocals processed through a Vocoder.

According to Terrorizer Magazine (article named "Lost Classics & Follies"), it is allegedly the lowest-selling album in the history of Earache Records. Though not well received at the time of its release, retrospective reviews are more positive. Allmusic referred to the album as a notable precursor of industrial techno.

Professional ratings
Review scores
Source	Rating
Allmusic	3/5 stars

== Track listing ==
All songs written and arranged by Dubin/Plotkin.

1. Last Look – 10:58
2. Break (You) – 5:57
3. Devolve – 5:53
4. Under Glass – 7:54
5. Thug – 4:59
6. Rid – 5:44
7. Amoeba – 8:17

== Personnel ==
- Alan Dubin: All vocals
- James Plotkin: Guitars, bass, keyboards, drum programming, tapes, sampler
