= Towers... =

EP by Burning Witch
- Released: 1998
- Recorded: 1996
- Studio: Robert Lang (Shoreline, Washington)
- Genre: Doom metal
- Length: 36:52
- Label: Slap-a-Ham
- Producer: Steve Albini

Burning Witch chronology
Towers... (1998)	Rift.Canyon.Dreams (1998)

Towers... is the debut EP by the band Burning Witch. It was recorded by renowned indie producer Steve Albini. It was available as a part of the compilation album Crippled Lucifer (Seven Psalms for Our Lord of Light) and has since been re-released as a 2 disc set Crippled Lucifer (Ten Psalms for Our Lord of Light), through Southern Lord Records.

== Track listing ==
1. "Sacred Predictions" – 7:01
2. "Country Doctor" – 10:16
3. "Tower Place" – 5:26
4. "Sea Hag" – 14:09

== Personnel ==
- Stephen O'Malley – guitar
- G. Stuart Dahlguist – bass
- Jamie Sykes – drums
- Edgy 59 – vocals
