= Alan Dubin =

American vocalist/singer

Alan Dubin is an American vocalist/singer most widely known for his role in drone metal band Khanate. He is noted for his tortured and distinctive vocal approach. Other bands he has been featured in include OLD and current band Gnaw.

Dubin is also a professional film/video editor with many credits in TV commercials, shows, films, music videos and more.

== Studio discography ==
=== Old ===
- Old Lady Drivers – 1988
- Lo Flux Tube – 1991
- The Musical Dimensions of Sleastak – 1993
- Hold on To Your Face – 1993
- Formula – 1995

=== Khanate ===
- Khanate – 2001
- Live WFMU 91.1 (2002, Live)
- Things Viral – 2003
- No Joy (Remix) (2003, EP)
- Let Loose The Lambs (2004, Live DVD; limited to 230 copies)
- KHNT vs. Stockholm (2004, Live)
- Live Aktion Sampler 2004 (2004, Live)
- Capture & Release – 2005
- Dead/Live Aktions (2005, DVD)
- It's Cold When Birds Fall From The Sky (2005, Live; limited to 500 copies)
- Clean Hands Go Foul – 2009
- To Be Cruel - 2023

=== Gnaw ===
- This Face – 2009
- Horrible Chamber – 2013
- Cutting Pieces – 2017
- Barking Orders – 2020

=== A Taste For Decay ===
- Beneath Black Waters (featured on the track "Approaching Fresh Throats (Of Certain Ghosts To Be)" – 2010

=== Deathstench ===
- "DEATHSTENCH / Trepaneringsritualen" (featured on the track "Temples of Dust") – 2013
- XI-XVII-MMXV (Live album)- 2018

=== ÄÄNIPÄÄ ===
- Through A Pre-Memory (featured on the tracks "Muse", "Watch Over Stillness / Matters Principle") – 2013

=== 20.SV ===
- The Great Sonic Wave – 2013

=== Second Rope ===
- Second Rope – awaiting release 2025
