= Millions (band) =

American noise rock band

- Origin: Chicago
- Genres: Noise Rock
- Years active: 2006-present
- Labels: Seventh Rule Recordings; Team Abunai
- Members: Scott Flaster; Mark Konwinski; Corey Lyons; Pat O'Shea
- Website: millionsdistorts.com

Millions is an American noise rock band from Chicago.

Formed in late 2006, they played their first shows and released their first EP in 2007. The EP, Telephone Game, was released on Team Abunai records.

In 2008, they recorded their first full length, Gather Scatter. It was released on Seventh Rule Recordings in 2009. Following a European tour, the band released a 4 song EP on Brutal Panda Records entitled Panic Program.

In 2012, they announced a second full length, Failure Tactics, to be released on Seventh Rule Recordings.

Millions features former members of Small Brown Bike, Bodyhammer, and New Jersey Joystick. They are perhaps best known for their signature count-off at the beginning of most songs: "One, two, you know what to do...," as can be heard on their first full-length LP.

== Discography ==
=== Albums ===
- Gather Scatter - 2009 on Seventh Rule Recordings
- Failure Tactics - 2012 on Seventh Rule Recordings

=== EPs ===
- Telephone Game 7-inch EP - 2007 on Team Abunai
- Saddle Up and Ride EP - 2008 on Team Abunai
- Panic Program 7-inch EP - 2010 on Brutal Panda
