= Dommedagsnatt =

Studio album by Thorr's Hammer
- Released: 1996 & 1998
- Recorded: 1995
- Genre: Death/doom metal
- Length: 32:21
- Label: Southern Lord (SUNN01)
- Producer: Count Schneeberger

Thorr's Hammer chronology
Sannhet i Blodet (1994)	Dommedagsnatt (1996)

Professional ratings
Review scores
Source	Rating
Allmusic	4/5 stars

Dommedagsnatt is the only album released by Norwegian-American metal band Thorr's Hammer.

It was originally released on Moribund Records on cassette in 1996, but gained attention in 1998 after a CD reissue on Southern Lord Records. The CD release contained a track that was not on the original cassette version (Mellom Galgene). The album was reissued in 2004 via a 1,000-CD run, this time with a bonus live video and on picture disc. In 2009, Southern Lord reissued the album on vinyl, in both clear and black vinyl versions, and with new cover art.

== Track listing ==
1. "Norge" – 7:37
2. "Troll" – 4:25
3. "Dommedagsnatt" – 8:07
4. "Mellom Galgene" (live) – 12:12

== Credits ==
- Runhild Gammelsæter (aka Ozma) - vocals and lyrics
- Greg Anderson - electric guitar
- Stephen O'Malley - electric guitar
- James Hale - bass guitar
- Jamie Sykes - drums
