= Swell (band) =

American indie rock band

- Origin: San Francisco, California
- Genre: Indie rock
- Years active: 1989–present
- Labels: Talitres, Badman Recording Co, Def American, pSycho-sPecific
- Past members: David Freel (deceased); Monte Vallier; Sean Kirkpatrick; John Dettman; Tom Hays; Doran Bastin; Niko Wenner
- Website: www.swellsongs.com

Swell was an indie rock band formed in San Francisco in 1989 when David Freel (vocals/guitar) and Sean Kirkpatrick (drums) completed enough songs for what would become the first album.

== History ==
The band recorded a self-titled debut album and released it on Freel's own pSychosPecificMusic label in April 1990. Swell's influences range from 1980s post-punk bands, Pink Floyd to folk, noise pop and Ennio Morricone film scores.

Freel, Kirkpatrick and Mark Signorelli (bass) spent early summer of 1990 busking on the streets of Europe, mainly in Spain. While they were busking, Monte Vallier was doing press and radio publicity for the album release at home. "Swell" did very well on college radio and got many reviews in industry magazines. Club promoters were calling to book the band, but when they returned to the States, Signorelli moved back to New York City. For a support slot for Mazzy Star at San Francisco's I-Beam, Monte Vallier joined as bass player and John Dettman-Lytle, David's loft-mate at 41 Turk Street, was asked to join as a second guitarist.

This configuration toured around California during the fall of 1990. By early 1991 their booking agent in Belgium was calling them back to Europe to play shows in France, Germany, Austria, the Benelux, Switzerland, and Norway.

That same year they recorded a second album, ...Well?, which was released in February 1992, also on the pSychoSpecificMusic label. Though Dettman left the band soon after, Freel, Kirkpatrick, and Vallier carried on, receiving an offer from Def American to give ...Well? a wider release one year after its first issue.

Adding guitarist Tom Hays following the sojourn of Pete Vogl on guitar, Swell kept up a heavy touring schedule of Europe and the US. They began recording their third album, 41, in 1992. It was released by American in November 1993. In 1993 Niko Wenner (Oxbow, Jellyfish) replaced Hays, and toured with the band on guitar, backing vocals, and keyboard through 2003. Subsequent albums include 1997's Too Many Days Without Thinking and 1998's For All the Beautiful People. The latter album included Wenner on guitar and backing vocals, and Rob Ellis (PJ Harvey, Laika, Spleen) on drums. John Vallier played drums on Swell's 1997 United States and European tours.

== Swell / Be My Weapon ==
Everybody Wants to Know, more a Freel solo album than anything else since Vallier left the band while making it, appeared in spring 2001. Whenever You're Ready- recorded with Sean Kirkpatrick - and the compilation Bastards and Rarities (featuring unreleased tracks and alternate mixes of songs from early albums), which both appeared in 2003. Early 2004 Swell toured the States for the first time in six years.

Swell also toured Europe again in 2004 and played shows in Belgium, Holland, Denmark, Spain (Primavera Sound Festival) and in France. The tour band consisted of Mat Mathews on drums, Greg Baldzikowski (keyboards and guitars), Doran Bastin (bass) and David Freel (vox, acoustic guitar).

After three years of silence David Freel started recording new songs in spring 2007, assisted by Nick Lucero (ex-Qotsa) on drums. The new album South of the Rain and the Snow was released on 12 December 2007 on Freel's own label pSychosPecificMusic, together with The Lost Album, a 9-track compilation of rarities from the 1995–1997 era. Both records were also released by the French label Talitres in 2008.

Swell toured Europe in October/November 2008. The band played dates in France, Austria, England, Switzerland, Holland, Germany, Spain, Portugal and Belgium where the tour ended on 26 November with an extra show in Heist-Op-Den-Berg. David Freel's sidekicks on this tour were Ron Burns (drums) and Brian Mumford (guitar & fx).

In March 2009 David Freel released the album Be My Weapon, for the first time without using the name 'Swell'.

Freel died on April 12, 2022.

== European Tribute Tour 2023 ==
Original members united for a tribute to David (Kirkpatrick, Vallier, Wenner and Dettman-Lytle) in April 2023, playing favorite songs from the first 4 albums.

== West Coast Reunion Tour 2023 ==
Kirkpatrick, Vallier, Wenner and Dettman-Lytle continued the Reunion Tour in December 2023, with final shows in Los Angeles, San Francisco, Portland, and Seattle.

== European Tour 2026 ==
For this tour, original members Sean Kirkpatrick (drums) and John Dettman-Lytle (vocals/guitar) are joined by Tim Adams (bass) and Philippe Gunst (guitar/keys, Fragment), the tour will include dates in Belgium, the Netherlands, France and the UK.

== Discography ==
- Swell (1990) pSychosPecificMusic
- ...Well? (1991) Def American
- 41 (1994) American (US)/Beggars (EU)
- Too Many Days Without Thinking (1997) Beggars Banquet Records
- For All the Beautiful People (1998) Beggars Banquet Records
- Feed (2000) Beggars Banquet Records
- Everybody Wants to Know (2001) Beggars Banquet Records
- Bastards and Rarities 1989-1994 (compilation) (2003) Badman Recording Co
- Whenever You're Ready (2003) Beggars Banquet Records/Badman Recording Co
- South of the Rain and Snow (2007) pSychosPecificMusic / Talitres
- The Lost Album (compilation) (2007) pSychosPecificMusic / Talitres
- Be My Weapon (2009) pSychosPecificMusic
- Greasy (2014) pSychosPecificMusic
