= Asva (band) =

American drone metal music project

- Origin: Seattle, Washington, United States
- Genres: Drone metal, doom metal
- Years active: 2003–present
- Labels: Dos Fatales, Southern Records, Important Records
- Members: G. Stuart Dahlquist; Toby Driver; Greg Gilmore; Jake Weller
- Past members: See list of past members below

Asva is an American, Seattle-based drone metal project, with a revolving line-up formed by G. Stuart Dahlquist (formerly of Burning Witch and Goatsnake) who is the only constant member. Past members have included Trey Spruance, Toby Driver, Jessika Kenney, and Greg Gilmore amongst many others. The name of the project is from the Sanskrit word aśva, meaning workhorse.

== Members ==
=== Current members ===
- G. Stuart Dahlquist – bass, organ (2003–present)
- Toby Driver – vocals, guitar (2010–present)
- Greg Gilmore – drums (2008–present)
- Jake Weller – trumpet

=== Past members ===
- Andrew McInnis – organ
- Dylan Carlson – guitar (2003)
- Brad Mowen – vocals, drums (2003–2008)
- John Schuller – guitar (2004–2007)
- Trey Spurance – guitar, keyboard, samples (2004–2008)
- Troy Swanson – organ (2004–2007)
- Jessika Kenney – vocals (2004–2007)
- Billy Anderson – vocals, guitar (2004)
- Daniel La Rochelle – guitar (2005)
- Milky Burgess – guitar (2007–2008)
- Holly Johnson – vocals (2007) (session only)
- Ben Thomas – percussion (2008) (session only)
- Rick Troy – guitar (2009)
- David Webb – guitar (2009)

== Discography ==
Title	Year	Label	Notes
Caprichos 1-80 / Rift Canyon Dreams	2004	Dos Fatales	Split LP with Burning Witch
Futurists Against The Ocean	2005	Dos Fatales / Web of Mimicry	LP version issued in 2008 by Southern Records
Asva	2005	Enterruption	Vinyl LP only
What You Don't Know Is Frontier	2008	Southern Records	
The Third Plagues / A Trap For Judges	2005	Enterruption	EP
Live In London: September 8, 2005	2008	Broken Press	Limited edition CD-R
Presences Of Absences	2011	Important Records	
Empires Should Burn...	2012	Basses Frequences / Small Doses	collaboration with multi-instrumentalist Philippe Petit
Surprize - Northsix, Brooklyn 4.20.05	2013	(no label)	Self-released limited edition of 100 hand numbered copies.
Bring Me A Monkey	2013	Luchtrat	Limited edition 3" CD, 72 copies
