= Cyclotron (album) =

Studio album by Blind Idiot God
- Released: 1992
- Recorded: BC Studio, Brooklyn, NY; Greenpoint Studios, Brooklyn, NY
- Genre: Noise rock, math rock
- Length: 51:50
- Label: Avant
- Producer: Bill Laswell

Blind Idiot God chronology
Undertow (1988)	Cyclotron (1992)	Before Ever After (2015)

Cyclotron is the third album by Blind Idiot God, released in 1992 through Avant Records. It became the band's final studio album for twenty-three years after drummer Ted Epstein left the band in 1996, causing the band to go on an indefinite hiatus. Cyclotron remains Blind Idiot God's last album recorded with the original line-up intact.

Composer Bill Laswell, who had worked with the band on their previous album, returned to fill production duties. Guitarist Andy Hawkins began utilizing more feedback and looping techniques in the music, which he would further explore on Halo, his solo guitar project.

== Critical reception ==
Professional ratings
Review scores
Source	Rating
Allmusic	3/5 stars

In writing for allmusic, Brian Olewnick noted that the trio were immensely talented and erudite musicians capable of playing music that was "head and shoulders over most thrash-influenced math rock." Despite this, Olewnick concluded that the group showed little artistic growth and "it was becoming clear that this particular well was beginning to show signs of dryness and that perhaps the band members would be advised to think of drilling elsewhere." Jakubowski of The Wire shared similar criticisms, stating that, despite the material being some of the strongest the group had released, that the music lacked progression.

== Track listing ==
All music is composed by Andy Hawkins, except "Head On" co-written by Ted Epstein and Gabriel Katz.

No.	Title	Length
1.	"747"	4:16
2.	"Slackjaw"	4:51
3.	"Ground Lift"	4:01
4.	"Thunderhead"	4:39
5.	"Head On"	3:55
6.	"Hangtime"	5:00
7.	"Cloudcover"	6:37
8.	"Cold Start"	2:43
9.	"Death Hollow Canyon, Utah"	4:35
10.	"Easing Back"	5:02
11.	"Broadside"	2:45
12.	"Dead Continent Dub"	3:26

== Personnel ==
Adapted from the Cyclotron liner notes.

Blind Idiot God

- Ted Epstein – drums
- Andy Hawkins – guitar
- Gabriel Katz – bass guitar

Production and additional personnel

- Ted Barron – photography
- Martin Bisi – engineering
- Oz Fritz – engineering, mixing
- Tomoyo T.L. Karath – design
- Bill Laswell – production
- Robert Musso – engineering
- Howie Weinberg – mastering

== Release history ==
Region	Date	Label	Format	Catalog
United States	1992	Avant	CD	AVAN 010
