= Gabriel Katz =

- Birth name: Gabriel Paul Katz
- Genres: Noise rock, math rock
- Occupation: Musician
- Instrument: Bass guitar
- Years active: 1982–2012

Gabriel Paul Katz is an American bassist and founding member of the noise rock band Blind Idiot God. He performed with the band since its formation, recording three studio albums with them between 1987 and 1992. He also assisted bandmate Andy Hawkins in the recording of his Drone music project Halo, released as Azonic in 1994.

== Biography ==
Gabriel Katz founded Blind Idiot God with drummer Ted Epstein and guitarist Andy Hawkins in 1982. After three albums, Blind Idiot God went on hiatus in 1996 when Epstein left the group. Katz reunited with Hawkins after Tim Wyskida joined the band as a full-time member. However, he developed tendinitis and hearing problems which further delayed band activities. He joined them on stage for their 2006 tour and performed with them until his departure in 2012. He has named John Coltrane as being the greatest influence to him as a musician, saying "He made me realize that music could be a really powerful tool."

== Discography ==
Blind Idiot God

- Blind Idiot God (SST, 1987)
- Undertow (Enemy, 1988)
- Cyclotron (Avant, 1992)

Other appearances

- Praxis: Sacrifist (Subharmonic, 1993)
- Azonic: Halo (Strata, 1994)
- Automaton: Dub Terror Exhaust (Strata, 1994)
