= Blind Idiot God (album) =

Studio album by Blind Idiot God
- Released: 1987
- Recorded: January – February 1987
- Studio: BC Studio (Brooklyn, NY)
- Genre: Noise rock
- Length: 42:24
- Label: SST (104)
- Producer: Martin Bisi, Blind Idiot God

Blind Idiot God chronology
Blind Idiot God (1987)	Undertow (1988)

Blind Idiot God is the debut album by Blind Idiot God, released in 1987 through SST Records. Produced by Martin Bisi, the album was released on CD, cassette and vinyl record. The album showcased the band's eclectic tastes for punk rock, heavy metal, dub, free jazz, and classical music. It was critically well-received and attracted the attention of John Zorn, Alex Winter and Henry Rollins, who all became devoted admirers of the group.

== Recording ==
English electro and dub music producer Adrian Sherwood was originally considered to helm production duties on Blind Idiot God. Instead, the band met Brooklyn-based producer Martin Bisi, who had collaborated with a plethora of New York-based acts and shared the band's eclectic tastes. It was recorded during the months of January and February 1987 at Bisi's B.C. Studios located in Brooklyn, New York.

== Music ==
Brian Olewnick describes the music in his review of the album for AllMusic: "Often they begin with anthemic lines, precisely and forcefully etched by Andy Hawkins' guitar, backed by the supple, powerful drumming of Ted Epstein. But, midway through, the melodies tend to be twisted and pulled like taffy, elongating into mutant forms only hinted at previously. This creates a marvelous tension, as one is never certain how a given song will resolve."

== Critical reception ==
Professional ratings
Review scores
Source	Rating
AllMusic	4.5/5 stars
New Musical Express	10/10

Olewnick lauded Blind Idiot God, saying that "the listener feels buffeted about, as if inside a roaring engine at 30,000 feet." Option described the band as sounding "as much like jazz-based ensembles like Bill Laswell's Last Exit and Zorn's Spy Vs. project trying to dip into hardcore as they do like angry young boy thrash." Electronic Musician praised the virtuosity of the players and said "jazz, heavy metal, reggae, art music - B.I.G. has elements of all of these, yet establishes their very own recipe."

== Track listing ==
All tracks are written by Andy Hawkins, except "Stravinsky/Blasting Off" by Igor Stravinsky, arr. Hawkins, "More Time" by the Meters and "Wise Man Dub" by Gabriel Katz.

No.	Title	Length
1.	"Stravinsky/Blasting Off"	2:17
2.	"Shifting Sand"	3:38
3.	"Tired Blood"	5:00
4.	"Wide Open Spaces"	4:59
5.	"Subterranean Flight"	4:47
6.	"More Time" (The Meters cover)	2:36
7.	"Dark & Bright"	4:51
8.	"Wise Man Dub"	4:33
9.	"Stealth Dub"	4:43
10.	"Raining Dub"	5:00

== Personnel ==
Adapted from the Blind Idiot God liner notes.

Blind Idiot God

- Ted Epstein – drums
- Andy Hawkins – electric guitar
- Gabriel Katz – bass guitar

Production and additional personnel

- Martin Bisi – production, mixing
- Blind Idiot God – production, mixing
- John Golden – mastering
- Phoebe Love – photography
- Miles Rutlin – illustrations, design

== Release history ==
Region	Date	Label	Format	Catalog
United States	1987	SST	CD, CS, LP	SST 104
