= Undertow (Blind Idiot God album) =

Studio album by Blind Idiot God
- Released: 1988
- Recorded: May – June 1988
- Studio: BC Studio (Brooklyn, NY)
- Genre: Noise rock, math rock
- Length: 41:11
- Label: Enemy
- Producer: Bill Laswell

Blind Idiot God chronology
Blind Idiot God (1987)	Undertow (1988)	Cyclotron (1992)

Professional ratings
Review scores
Source	Rating
AllMusic	4/5 stars

Undertow is the second album by Blind Idiot God, released in 1989 through Enemy Records.

== Accolades ==
Publication	Country	Accolade	Year	Rank
Spex	Germany	Albums of the Year	1988	30

== Track listing ==
All music is composed by Andy Hawkins, except "Alice in My Fantasies" by George Clinton and Eddie Hazel and "Purged Specimen" by John Zorn.

No.	Title	Length
1.	"Sawtooth"	2:27
2.	"Clockwork Dub"	4:29
3.	"Atomic Whip"	4:28
4.	"Watch Yer Step"	3:14
5.	"Drowning"	6:04
6.	"Major Key Dub"	4:10
7.	"Alice in My Fantasies" (Funkadelic cover)	2:56
8.	"Rollercoaster"	4:36
9.	"Dubbing in the Sinai"	3:49
10.	"Wailing Wall"	3:05
11.	"Purged Specimen"	1:53

== Personnel ==
Adapted from the Undertow liner notes.

Blind Idiot God

- Ted Epstein – drums
- Andy Hawkins – guitar
- Gabriel Katz – bass guitar

Production and additional personnel

- Martin Bisi – mixing, recording
- Bill Laswell – production
- Howie Weinberg – mastering
- John Zorn – alto saxophone and production (11)

== Release history ==
Region	Date	Label	Format	Catalog
United States	1988	Enemy	CD, LP	EMY 107
