= Andy Hawkins (musician) =

- Born: Andrew Benton Hawkins; April 28, 1965 (age 61)
- Genres: Noise rock, drone, experimental music
- Occupation: Musician
- Instrument: Guitar
- Years active: 1982–present
- Label: Strata
- Website: azonicsonic.bandcamp.com

Andrew Benton Hawkins (born April 28, 1965) is a composer, record producer and guitarist from Missouri as well as a founding member of the band Blind Idiot God. He has also recorded as a solo artist under the moniker Azonic, releasing two experimental drone albums that were more abstract and feedback-based compared to his more structured work in Blind Idiot God.

== Biography ==
=== Early life and Blind Idiot God ===
Andrew Benton Hawkins was born on April 28, 1965, and grew up in St. Louis, Missouri. At the age of thirteen, Hawkins became motivated to play music when he discovered the ballet Firebird composed by Igor Stravinsky, which he claims to have opened his eyes to the boundless possibilities of music. While still a teenager, he formed Blind Idiot God with Ted Epstein and Gabriel Katz in 1982. They originally played a blend of hardcore and funk music before augmenting their sound to include dub, free jazz and classical music. In 1987, the band released their debut album, the eponymously titled Blind Idiot God, to great acclaim in the underground musical community. Their second album and third album were produced by composer Bill Laswell and titled Undertow and Cyclotron respectively.

After Ted Epstein left the band in 1996 and Gabriel Katz followed in 2012, Andy became the only original member still performing in Blind Idiot God. In 2014, he founded the Brooklyn-based label Indivisible Music, with the intention of "promot[ing] that which cannot be divided, the elemental idea of music for its own sake." Blind Idiot God released Before Ever After on February 24, 2015, marking the band's first album of new studio material in thirteen years.

=== Azonic ===
In 1994, Hawkins released Halo, a solo album recorded with Bill Laswell and bandmate Gabriel Katz. Comprising four lengthy drone pieces, the album marked a departure from his recordings with Blind Idiot God. It was well-received from a critical standpoint, with The Wire crediting it as an understated masterpiece of post-metal. Two Azonic tracks also appeared on Subsonic 3: Skinner's Black Laboratories, a split with guitarist Justin Broadrick of Godflesh. Brian Olewnick of allmusic described Hawkins' work as a "fuzz-strewn maelstrom that would send most metal guitarists loping home, tail between legs."

Azonic, now performing as a duo of Andy Hawkins and Tim Wyskida, will play its first show in decades on April 14 at Saint Vitus Bar in Brooklyn. A second album is set to be released by Indivisible Music on October 20, 2017. The music was recorded at Martin Bisi's BC Studios with producer Bill Laswell overseeing the final mix.

== Musical style ==
With an ability to traverse multiple genres and styles and utilize distortion and drone music, Andy Hawkins' technique has been described as being forceful yet precise. Hawkins has noted the importance of equipment and the role space plays in his sound, saying, "I can't play through a small amp for an entire recording. I've got to have that big-amp impact along with the ambience of the room. There's a lot of complexity in a distorted guitar tone, and it needs some room to breathe." The Wire described him as "a master of oceanic reverb and sustain, turning riffs from concrete slabs to gentle, body-caressing ripples." Hawkins has cited modern classical composers such György Ligeti, Krzysztof Penderecki and especially Igor Stravinsky as an influence, crediting The Firebird with kindling his passion for music at an early age.

== Personal life ==
Hawkins and his wife, Mili, live in Brooklyn NY.

== Discography ==
- Halo (1994)
- Skinner's Black Laboratories (1996)
