= Khanate (album) =

2001 album by Khanate

Studio album by Khanate
- Released: 2001
- Recorded: 2001
- Studio: Nekro Drone-8-Negatives
- Genre: Drone metal
- Length: 56:25
- Label: Southern Lord Records (SUNN14)
- Producer: James Plotkin

Khanate chronology
Khanate (2001)	Things Viral (2003)

Professional ratings
Review scores
Source	Rating
AllMusic	4/5 stars
Rock Sound	3.5/5 stars

Khanate is the debut album by Khanate. The album was released in 2001 through Southern Lord Records.

A CDR demo edition titled "tektonikdoom", of which only 20 in yellow vellum were made, was released prior to the release of the actual album. On some copies of the demo, "Pieces of Quiet" was titled "Quiet Time". It was also released on LP with 900 black and 100 transsmoke 220g records being pressed. Julian Cope described this record as an "orchestrated root-canal".

== Track listing ==
- All songs written and arranged by Khanate.

No.	Title	Length
1.	"Pieces of Quiet"	13:24
2.	"Skin Coat"	9:40
3.	"Torching Koroviev"	3:37
4.	"Under Rotting Sky"	18:17
5.	"No Joy"	11:27
Total length:		56:25

== Personnel ==
- Alan Dubin: Vocals
- Stephen O'Malley: Guitars
- James Plotkin: Bass
- Tim Wyskida: Drums
