= Burning Witch =

American sludge/doom metal band

- Origin: Seattle, Washington, U.S.
- Genres: Doom metal; sludge metal; drone metal
- Years active: 1995–1998
- Labels: Southern Lord, Hydra Head, Slap-a-Ham, Merciless
- Past members: Stephen O'Malley; Greg Anderson; George Stuart Dahlquist; Edgy 59; Jamie Sykes; B.R.A.D

Burning Witch was an American doom/sludge metal band from Seattle, Washington, active between 1995 and 1998. Aside from EPs and split releases, the band released a compilation album called Crippled Lucifer, which had songs of their early EPs.

== History ==
Burning Witch formed on Capitol Hill, Seattle in early 1995. After the breakup of the doom/death band Thorr's Hammer in 1995, Stephen O'Malley, Greg Anderson and Jamie Sykes formed Burning Witch. The band then added G. Stuart Dahlquist and vocalist Edgy 59, rounding out their lineup. Anderson left the band before they had recorded any real Burning Witch songs to start the band Goatsnake.

In 1996, the band in this incarnation recorded songs with renowned indie producer Steve Albini, which would become the Towers... EP. This collection would actually not see a formal release until 1998 on Slap A Ham Records. After the sessions for these songs, Sykes left the band and was replaced by B.R.A.D.

The sessions that followed the Albini recordings resulted in the Rift.Canyon.Dreams EP, which would prove to be the final recordings by the band, as they broke up soon after the disc was completed. It was released on Merciless Records, but like its predecessor, did not receive much attention outside its scene.

=== Post-breakup ===
Crippled Lucifer, a compilation CD of the two EPs, was released soon after on Southern Lord Records, the label founded by Anderson and O'Malley. Burning Witch performed their last shows in the fall of 1998 after which Edgy 59 left for Sinisstar, O'Malley reunited with Anderson to form Sunn O))), and Dahlquist joined Anderson in Goatsnake. Currently, O'Malley is in various projects including Sunn O))). Dahlquist and B.R.A.D are in Asva.

== Musical style ==
Most of the music of Burning Witch is very slow and heavy with the drums slowly plodding along with the bass and guitar playing minimalist riffs. Emphasis is usually put on spaces between notes, allowing the bass and guitar to resonate before proceeding to the next note. There are occasional bursts of feedback and noise from O'Malley, but for the most part the guitar and bass follow each other. One of the qualities of Burning Witch is Edgy 59's vocals which alter between a nasal and melodic singing voice to a brutal, tortured, and demented scream or shriek.

There are noticeable differences between the songs on Towers... and Rift. Canyon.Dreams with Towers... being more intense and aggressive and Rift.Canyon.Dreams being more morose and brooding.

The Crippled Lucifer compilation contains all but one song from their two LPs. Goatsnake/Burning Witch split contains two songs, one from each of the LP recording sessions (and the one omitted from Crippled Lucifer), and the Asva / Burning Witch split contains the song "Rift. Canyon.Dreams".

A lot of terms have been used to describe Burning Witch's highly untraditional sound. Among these are "suicide doom", "transdimensional drone doom", "true blackened doom", and "molasses sludge". Stephen O'Malley has said these descriptions are "ridiculous", insisting Burning Witch is just slow and heavy doom with unique vocals. There is a natural progression in the sound of Burning Witch to the pair's later project Sunn O))), especially on Black One. Comparisons can also be made to O'Malley's later project Khanate.

== Discography ==
- Towers... 12" EP (Slap-a-Ham Records 1996)
- Rift.Canyon.Dreams 12" EP (Merciless Records 1997)
- Crippled Lucifer (Seven Psalms for Our Lord of Light) CD (Southern Lord Records 1998)
- Goatsnake/Burning Witch split CD with Goatsnake (Hydra Head Records 2000)
- split 12" with Asva (Dos Fatales Records 2004).
- Crippled Lucifer (Ten Psalms for Our Lord of Light) 2xCD (also a numbered edition of 2000 came with a "dropcard" which contained a downloadable only version of the band's unreleased 1996 demo and a live performance which was Greg Anderson's only known recording with the band) (Southern Lord Records 2008)
