= Khanate (band) =

American metal band

- L-R: Stephen O'Malley, James Plotkin, Tim Wyskida, Alan Dubin

Background information
- Origin: New York City, U.S.
- Genres: Drone metal; doom metal; experimental metal
- Years active: 2000–2006; 2009–2010, 2017–present
- Labels: Southern Lord; Hydra Head; Load; Sacred Bones
- Members: Alan Dubin; James Plotkin; Stephen O'Malley; Tim Wyskida
- Website: khanateofficial.com

Khanate is an American drone doom supergroup consisting of James Plotkin and Alan Dubin (OLD), as well as Tim Wyskida (Blind Idiot God, Manbyrd) and Stephen O'Malley (Burning Witch, Sunn O)))). Keeping some similarity with O'Malley's previous band Burning Witch, Khanate produces songs that usually exceeded the 10-minute mark, characterized by extremely slow tempos, harsh layers of feedback, and vocalist Alan Dubin's shrieking.

== History ==
On September 24, 2006, Khanate split up, with Plotkin stating that the "lack of commitment from certain members" led to the split.

In the January/February 2009 issue of Rock-A-Rolla magazine, Dubin stated: "We had a few festival offers [that] sparked some talk of a reunion but they didn't pan out in the end." He went on to say, "I highly doubt a reunion will happen."

On May 19, 2023, the band released a surprise album titled To Be Cruel digitally and announced preorders for a physical release to be released in June. The band also announced digital reissues of its four previous albums and plans for physical reissues to follow.

== Members ==
- Alan Dubin – vocals (2000–2006, 2009–2010, 2017–present)
- Stephen O'Malley – guitars (2000–2006, 2009–2010, 2017–present)
- James Plotkin – bass (2000–2006, 2009–2010, 2017–present)
- Tim Wyskida – drums (?–2006, 2009–2010, 2017–present)

== Discography ==
=== Studio albums ===
- Khanate (2001)
- Things Viral (2003)
- Capture & Release (2005)
- Clean Hands Go Foul (2009)
- To Be Cruel (2023)

=== Other releases ===
- Live WFMU 91.1 (2002, Live)
- No Joy (Remix) (2003, EP)
- Let Loose the Lambs (2004, Live DVD; limited to 230 copies)
- KHNT vs. Stockholm (2004, Live)
- Live Aktion Sampler 2004 (2004, Live)
- Dead/Live Aktions (2005, DVD)
- It's Cold When Birds Fall from the Sky (2005, Live; limited to 500 copies)

== See also ==
- Sunn O)))
- Gnaw
- Burning Witch
- Blind Idiot God
- Khlyst
