= Subsonic 3: Skinner's Black Laboratories =

Studio album by Justin Broadrick/Azonic
- Released: August 29, 1995
- Recorded: Various: Avalanche Studios; (Conwy, UK); Greenpoint Studios; (Brooklyn, NY)
- Genre: Drone, experimental rock
- Length: 50:37
- Label: Sub Rosa
- Producer: Justin Broadrick, Bill Laswell, Andy Hawkins

Justin Broadrick chronology
Subsonic 3: Skinner's Black Laboratories (1995)	J² (2008)

Azonic chronology
Halo (1994)	Skinner's Black Laboratories (1995)

Professional ratings
Review scores
Source	Rating
Allmusic	3/5 stars

Subsonic 3: Skinner's Black Laboratories is a collaborative album by Andy Hawkins and Justin Broadrick, released on August 29, 1995 by Sub Rosa.

== Track listing ==
No.	Title	Music	Length
1.	"Guitar One"	Justin Broadrick	9:02
2.	"Guitar Two"	Justin Broadrick	7:21
3.	"Guitar Three"	Justin Broadrick	10:45
4.	"Guitar Four"	Justin Broadrick	13:35
5.	"River Blindness"	Andy Hawkins	10:04
6.	"Nine Tails"	Andy Hawkins	13:25

== Personnel ==
Adapted from the Subsonic 3: Skinner's Black Laboratories liner notes.

Musicians

- Justin Broadrick – electric guitar (1–4), production (1–4)
- Andy Hawkins – electric guitar (5, 6), production (5, 6)

Production and additional personnel

- Guy Marc Hinant – editing
- Bill Laswell – production (5, 6)
- Layng Martin – engineering (5, 6), mixing (5, 6)
- Manuel Mohino – engineering
- Robert Musso – engineering (5, 6), mixing (5, 6)

== Release history ==
Region	Date	Label	Format	Catalog
United States	1995	Sub Rosa	CD	SR90
