= Downloaded (film) =

- Directed by: Alex Winter
- Written by: Alex Winter
- Produced by: Alex Winter
- Cinematography: Anghel Decca
- Edited by: Jacob Craycroft
- Music by: DJ Spooky
- Distributed by: VH1
- Release dates: March 10, 2013 (SXSW); June 21, 2013 (United States)
- Running time: 106 minutes
- Language: English
- Box office: $8,377

Downloaded is a documentary film directed by Alex Winter about the downloading generation and the impact of filesharing on the Internet. A teaser of the film premiered at SXSW on March 14, 2012. The feature film made its world premiere at SXSW on March 10, 2013, and was shown at other film festivals around the world. VH1 partnered with AOL to distribute the film widely and was broadcast as a VH1 Rock Docs feature in late 2014.

== Plot ==
This documentary film addresses the evolution of digital media sharing on the Internet. It features exclusive interviews with software developers and musicians about controversial filesharing software, and particularly Napster. It follows Napster from its rise in 1999, through the swarm of lawsuits that ensued and to its acquisition by Rhapsody in 2011. Some of those interviewed include Henry Rollins, Billy Corgan, former record producer and Island Records founder Chris Blackwell, former Sony Music Chairman Don Ienner, former CEO of the RIAA Hilary Rosen, Beastie Boys’ Mike D, Nine Inch Nails frontman Trent Reznor, and Noel Gallagher.

== Development ==
Alex Winter met Shawn Fanning in 2002 and originally set out to write a narrative feature, but he became interested in the many different sides of the story there was to tell. Nearly 10 years after Winter first discussed making the film with Napster founders, Fanning and Parker, he was wrapping up interviews and filmed some of the final footage and interviews at the SXSW Conference in 2012.

== Promotion ==
A trailer for the film was released on December 7, 2012.

On March 12, 2013, following the world premiere at SXSW, there was a panel discussion including director Alex Winter and Napster co-founders Shawn Fanning and Sean Parker.

The film subsequently screened within such festivals as Hot Docs Canadian International Documentary Festival and Maryland Film Festival, with Alex Winter hosting screenings.

== Release ==
The film made its theatrical premiere on June 21, 2013, at Manhattan’s Village East Cinema, followed by showings in other select cities. It was released digitally on July 1, 2013.

== Reception ==
=== Box office ===
Downloaded opened in limited release on June 21, 2013, and grossed $2,504 at the box office its opening weekend from two theaters.

=== Critical reception ===
Downloaded received mixed reviews from movie critics upon its release. At Metacritic, which assigns a weighted average rating out of 100 to reviews from mainstream critics, the film has received an average score of 56, based on 6 reviews, indicating "mixed or average" feedback. As of June 2020, the film holds a 69% approval rating on film review aggregator website Rotten Tomatoes, based on thirteen reviews with an average rating of 6.54 out of 10. Joe Neumaier from the New York's Daily News called it "A fascinating, alternate-universe look at the dawn of the music-sharing phenom." On July 1, 2013, Complex rated it #6 on the "Best Movies of 2013 (So Far)" list. On the other hand, Alan Scherstuhl of The Village Voice stated, "The doc is only about as revealing as a middling magazine article on the subject."
