= Fuckfest (album) =

Album by Oxbow

Studio album by Oxbow
- Released: 2 May 1989
- Genre: Noise rock
- Length: 37:04
- Label: Pathological
- Producer: Oxbow

Oxbow chronology
Fuckfest (1989)	King of the Jews (1991)

Professional ratings
Review scores
Source	Rating
AllMusic	4.5/5 stars

Fuckfest is the debut album of Oxbow, released in 1989 on the band's own CFY Records, and later successively through Pathological Records, Crippled Dick Hot Wax, and Hydra Head Recordings, among others.

== Track listing ==
All tracks are written by Oxbow.

Side one
No.	Title	Length
1.	"Curse"	5:51
2.	"30 Miles"	5:47
3.	"The Valley"	5:50

Side two
No.	Title	Length
4.	"Bull's Eye"	4:03
5.	"Yoke"	6:12
6.	"Hunger"	9:21

== Personnel ==
Ox Bow

- Eugene S. Robinson – vocals, lyrics
- Niko Wenner – guitars, bass, piano, whistle, music
- Greg Davis – drums, percussion (1, 4)
- Tom Dobrov – drums, percussion (2, 5)

Additional musicians

- Steve Ballinger – chanter
- Bliss – southpaw piano
- Adam Cantwell – bass (6)
- Gibbs Chapman – bass (3)
- Justine Flores – piano
- Klaus Flouride – bass (1)
- Mona Rosario – whisper
- Jennifer Scott – whistle solo, vocal choir
- Eric Von Seggern – tuned percussion

Production

- Ox Bow – producers, arrangements
- Bart Thurber – recording
- Jim Blanchard – cover artwork, design
- James O'Mara – design
