= Capture & Release =

2005 album by Khanate

Studio album by Khanate
- Released: 2005
- Recorded: 2005
- Genre: Drone doom
- Length: 43:16
- Label: Hydra Head Records (HH666-87)
- Producer: James Plotkin

Khanate chronology
Things Viral (2003)	Capture & Release (2005)	Clean Hands Go Foul (2009)

Professional ratings
Review scores
Source	Rating
AllMusic	3.5/5 stars
Pitchfork	7.7/10
Stylus	A
Tiny Mix Tapes	3/5 stars

Capture & Release is the third album by the drone metal band Khanate. It was released in 2005 on the independent label Hydra Head.

The album contains only two tracks, "Capture" and "Release", both of which provide the album its name. The music can be described as booming and droning, accompanied by screaming vocals and occasional percussion.

== Track listing ==
No.	Title	Length
1.	"Capture"	18:13
2.	"Release"	25:03
Total length:		43:16
