= Ted Epstein =

American drummer

- Birth name: Theodore Jacob Epstein
- Genres: Noise rock, math rock
- Occupation: Musician
- Instrument(s): Drums, percussion
- Years active: 1982–96

Theodore Jacob Epstein is an American drummer and founding member of the noise rock band Blind Idiot God. He also improvised in the band Slan, which included saxophonist John Zorn and guitarist Elliott Sharp. He has not been credited with a musical performance since leaving Blind Idiot God in 1996.

== Biography ==
In 1982, Ted Epstein formed Blind Idiot God with bassist Gabriel Katz and guitarist Andy Hawkins in St. Louis, Missouri. He recorded three albums with the band Blind Idiot God in 1987, Undertow in 1988 and finally Cyclotron in 1992. He also participated in an Ornette Coleman tribute session with saxophonist John Zorn and performed live with guitarist Elliott Sharp and Zorn in the improvisational hardcore group Slan. In 1994, he appeared with other members of Blind Idiot God on the album Sacrifist by Praxis, one of Bill Laswell's musical projects. Epstein left Blind Idiot God in 1996 and did not rejoin them for their reunion in 2001. When Ted was younger he used to babysit for Brendan Kelly, singer of Chicago punk band The Lawrence Arms.

== Musical style ==
Epstein's drumming style has been highly acclaimed, with Brian Olewnick of allmusic saying that "[his] drumming is a marvel to hear, combining an overwhelming strength with an unusual subtlety of rhythmic choices that one doesn't often hear in music as ostensibly rock-based as this." Epstein has commented that funk music played a pivotal role in his development as a musician, naming Funkadelic, Grandmaster Flash, Sly and the Family Stone, and The Meters as being particularly influential. Concerning improvisation, Epstein has said, "I find it really challenging and interesting to see what happens when I'm put in a position where I have to create on the spot. More often than not, something very unique happens that I think would be hard to get out of myself under normal circumstances. I have to achieve a certain level of adrenalin."

== Discography ==
Blind Idiot God

- Blind Idiot God (SST, 1987)
- Undertow (Enemy, 1988)
- Cyclotron (Avant, 1992)

Other appearances

- Slan: Live at the Knitting Factory, Volume 3 (Enemy, 1990)
- Praxis: Sacrifist (Subharmonic, 1993)
