= OLD (band) =

American heavy metal band

O.L.D.
- Also known as: Old Lady Drivers
- Origin: Bergenfield, New Jersey
- Genres: Industrial metal; avant-garde metal; grindcore (early)
- Years active: 1986–1995
- Label: Earache
- Spinoffs: Khanate
- Spinoff of: Regurgitation
- Members: James Plotkin; Alan Dubin
- Past members: Jason Everman; Ralph Pimentel; Herschel Gaer

OLD (originally an acronym for Old Lady Drivers) was an American heavy metal band from Bergenfield, New Jersey, formed in 1986 and signed to Earache Records. It featured Alan Dubin on vocals, and James Plotkin on guitars and programming; they later formed the experimental doom metal band Khanate.

== History ==
OLD formed from the remains of Plotkin's previous band, the short-lived grindcore act Regurgitation. OLD's first album, entitled Old Lady Drivers, continued in the humorous style of grindcore which characterized Regurgitation's material.

After releasing a split EP with Assück in 1990, Plotkin recruited former Nirvana guitarist Jason Everman for their second album, Lo Flux Tube (1991). This album featured more avant-garde and industrial metal influences in addition to grindcore, giving them a sound which was compared by some reviewers to a more uptempo Godflesh. Lo Flux Tube also featured saxophone work by guest musician John Zorn.

OLD continued their avant-garde direction with their third album, The Musical Dimensions Of Sleastak (1993). Several tracks from that album, "A Beginning", "Two of Me (Parts One and Two)", "Freak Now", and "Peri Cynthion", appeared in the 1994 film Brainscan.

Also in 1993, the band released Hold On To Your Face, an album of remixes. The band's final album, Formula (1995), delved into further experimentation with techno and industrial music. OLD broke up shortly after releasing this album.

== Members ==
=== At the time of the breakup ===
- James Plotkin (guitars, programming)
- Alan Dubin (vocals)

=== Previous members ===
- Jason Everman (bass)
- Ralph Pimentel (drums)
- Herschel Gaer (bass)

== Discography ==
All releases were on Earache Records, except where otherwise noted.

- Old Lady Drivers (Full-length), 1988
- Colostomy Grab-Bag (Single), 1989
- Assuck/Old Lady Drivers (Split), 1990 (No System Records)
- Demo 1990 (self-produced)
- Lo Flux Tube (Full-length), 1991
- Hold On To Your Face (remixes) (Full-length), 1993
- The Musical Dimensions Of Sleastak (Full-length), 1993
- Formula (Full-length), 1995
