= Halo (Azonic album) =

Album by Andy hawkins

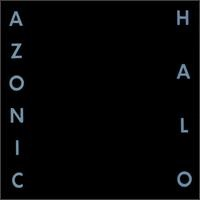

Studio album by Azonic
- Released: July 1, 1994
- Recorded: Greenpoint Studios (Brooklyn, NY)
- Genre: Drone, experimental rock
- Length: 46:03
- Label: Strata
- Producer: Bill Laswell

Azonic chronology
Halo (1994)	Skinner's Black Laboratories (1995)

Halo is the debut album of guitarist and composer Andy Hawkins, issued under the moniker Azonic. It was released on July 1, 1994 by Strata Records. Marking a departure from his work with Blind Idiot God, the album comprises four lengthy improvised guitar drones accompanied by electronics. Hawkins described the music as a "violent ambiance, harnessing the resonant frequencies of the void to take you out of the here and now."

== Critical reception ==
Professional ratings
Review scores
Source	Rating
Allmusic	4/5 stars

In writing for Allmusic, critic Brian Olewnick praised Hawkins' passionate and inventive playing style, saying "Hawkins manages to wring some tasty juice from an area, post-Hendrix rock guitar, that most would have considered long since dry." In 2006, The Wire described Halo as "a criminally overlooked post-Metal masterpiece" and called Hawkins "a master of oceanic reverb and sustain, turning riffs from concrete slabs to gentle, body-caressing ripples."

== Track listing ==
All music is composed by Andy Hawkins.

No.	Title	Length
1.	"Beyond the Pale"	10:16
2.	"Shore"	11:25
3.	"Headwaters"	11:25
4.	"Raze"	11:50

== Personnel ==
Adapted from the Halo liner notes.

Musicians

- Andy Hawkins – guitar, musical arrangements
- Gabriel Katz – effects, bass guitar

Production and additional personnel

- Oz Fritz – engineering
- Bill Laswell – production, musical arrangements
- Layng Martine – assistant engineer
- Alex Winter – photography, design

== Release history ==
Region	Date	Label	Format	Catalog
United States	1994	Strata	CD	0002-2
