= Supersonic Festival (Birmingham) =

Yearly music festival in Birmingham

- Genre: Experimental, electronic, heavy metal, hip hop, folk
- Locations: Birmingham, England
- Years active: 12 July 2003–present
- Founders: Capsule (Lisa Meyer and Jenny Moore)
- Website: www.supersonicfestival.co.uk

Supersonic Festival is a yearly music festival in Birmingham featuring a combination of music, art, film and other crafts. It is regarded as one of the leading experimental festivals in the UK due to its eclectic and diverse approach to music programming, crossing a number of genres, and its commitment to seeking out new and challenging performances.

The festival was first held in 2003 at the Custard Factory arts centre in Digbeth and has used warehouses, galleries and other venues in the area in subsequent years.

== See also ==
- List of music festivals in the United Kingdom
