= James Plotkin =

American musician

- Born: New Jersey, U.S.
- Genres: Drone metal; grindcore; industrial metal; experimental; sludge metal; avant-garde metal; cybergrind; digital hardcore; experimental rock; electronic; industrial hip hop; dub; ambient; dark ambient; illbient
- Occupation(s): Musician, producer
- Instrument(s): Guitar, bass
- Website: plotkinworks.com

James Plotkin is an American guitarist and producer known for his role in bands such as Khanate and OLD but with an extensive catalogue outside these bands. He has played guitar for Phantomsmasher and Scorn and continues to remix tracks for bands such as KK Null, Nadja, Sunn O))), ISIS, Pelican and Earth. He works in the genres of grindcore, industrial metal, noise music, drone metal, dark ambient, digital hardcore and post-metal.

== Discography ==
=== Solo work ===
- James Plotkin – A Strange, Perplexing – 1996
- James Plotkin – The Joy Of Disease – 1996
- James Plotkin / Pole – Split Series #8 (withdrawn version) – 2000
- James Plotkin / Pimmon – Split Series #8 – 2000
- James Plotkin – Kurtlanmak/Damascus – 2006
- James Plotkin – Indirmek – 2007

=== Collaborative releases ===
- James Plotkin & Kazuyuki K Null – Aurora – 1994
- Jimmy Plotkin & Alan Dubin (2× self-titled 7-inches) – 1995
- James Plotkin & K.K. Null – Aurora Remixes – 1996
- James Plotkin & Mick Harris – Collapse – 1996
- James Plotkin & Mark Spybey – A Peripheral Blur – 1999
- James Plotkin & Brent Gutzeit – Mosquito Dream – 1999
- James Plotkin & David Fenech – Strings and Stings compilation – 1999
- James Plotkin & Tim Wyskida – 8 Improvisations – 2006
- James Plotkin & Paal Nilssen-Love – Death Rattle – 2013

=== With OLD ===
- Old Lady Drivers – 1988
- Assück / O.L.D. – Split – 1990
- Lo Flux Tube – 1991
- The Musical Dimensions Of Sleastak – 1991
- Hold On To Your Face – 1993
- Formula – 1995

=== With Scorn ===
- Evanescence – 1994
- Anamnesis – Rarities 1994 – 1997

=== With Namanax ===
- Audiotronic – 1997
- Monstrous – 1998
- Gummo – o/s/t 199?

=== With Flux ===
- Protoplasmic – 1997

=== With Khanate ===
- Khanate- 2001
- Live WFMU 91.1 – 2002
- No Joy (Remix) – 2003
- Things Viral – 2003
- KHNTvsSTOCKHOLM – 2004
- Live Aktion Sampler – 2004
- Capture & Release – 2005
- It's Cold When Birds Fall From The Sky – 2005
- Clean Hands Go Foul – 2009
- To Be Cruel – 2023

=== With Phantomsmasher ===
- Phantomsmasher – Atomsmasher – 2001
- Phantomsmasher s/t – 2002
- Phantomsmasher – Podsjfkj Pojid Poa w/ Venetian Snares remix (7-inch EP) – 2002

=== With Khlyst ===
- Chaos Is My Name cd – 2006
- Chaos Live DVD – 2008

=== With Jodis ===
- Secret House cd/2xlp – 2009
- Black Curtain cd/lp – 2012
