= Rock-A-Rolla =

Music magazine

- Editor-in-chief: Vuk Valcic
- Frequency: Bi-monthly
- Founded: 2005
- Final issue: 2016
- Company: V-Squared Publishing
- Country: England
- Based in: London
- Language: English

Rock-A-Rolla was a music magazine covering experimental, avant-garde, noise and metal artists pushing the boundaries of music. Launched in late 2005, it was published bi-monthly in the UK by V-Squared Publishing Limited and distributed worldwide, mainly in the UK, the US, Canada, Europe and Australia. In the past the magazine has championed such diverse artists as Khanate, Zu, The Locust, Justin Broadrick, Mike Patton, Melvins and others. The editor-in-chief was Vuk Valcic.

The magazine ceased publishing in 2016 with the website not being updated and the Twitter feed only offering sale of back copies.
