= Bill Laswell discography =

- Studio albums: 70
- Soundtrack albums: 5
- Live albums: 4
- Compilation albums: 8
- Singles: 4
- Remix albums: 5

This article presents the complete oeuvre of American bassist, composer and music producer Bill Laswell, including his work as a band member and collaborating artist. Laswell has an expansive and eclectic discography and has been involved in hundreds of recordings with many artists from across the world. Laswell's music is influenced by a plethora of musical genres, such as funk, world music, jazz, drum and bass, dub and ambient music. Starting in 1978, Laswell has built a reputation as an accomplished bass player and composer. He has also had a prolific career as a music producer and sound engineer, overseeing the recording process of diverse musical acts such as Sly and Robbie, Afrika Bambaataa, Bernie Worrell, Blind Idiot God, Motörhead, Ramones, Henry Threadgill and Buckethead.

== As a solo artist ==
=== Studio albums ===
Released		Title
Year	Month	Title
1983	Jun	Baselines
1988	Mar	Hear No Evil
1994	Dec	Outer Dark
1995	Sep	Silent Recoil: Dub System One
1996	Sep	Oscillations
1997	Jul	City of Light
1998	Jun	Oscillations 2
1999	Mar	Invisible Design
1999	Sep	Imaginary Cuba
1999	Nov	Permutation
2000	Apr	Dub Chamber 3
2000	Oct	Lo. Def Pressure
2001	Sep	Filmtracks 2000
2001	Oct	Points of Order
2004	Sep	Version 2 Version: A Dub Transmission
2009	Mar	Invisible Design II
2012	Oct	Means of Deliverance
2012	Nov	Túwaqachi (The Fourth World)

=== Under a pseudonym ===
Released		Name	Title
Year	Month	Name	Title
1993	Oct	Divination	Ambient Dub Volume I
1993	Nov	Divination	Ambient Dub Volume II: Dead Slow
1994	Jul	Chaos Face	Doom Ride
1994	Aug	Automaton	Dub Terror Exhaust
1994	Oct	Automaton	Jihad (Points of Order)
1995	Mar	Divination	Akasha
1996	Jan	Possession + African Dub	Off World One
1996	Feb	Divination	Distill
1996	May	Sacred System	Chapter One: Book of Entrance
1997	Sep	Sacred System	Chapter Two
1998	Aug	Sacred System	Nagual Site
1998	Oct	Divination	Sacrifice
1999	May	Hashisheen	The End of Law
1999	Jul	Rasa	Serene Timeless Joy
2000	May	Operazone	The Redesign
2002	Oct	Sacred System	Book of Exit: Dub Chamber 4

=== Collaborative albums ===
Released		Title	Notes
Year	Month	Title	Notes
1987	May	Low Life	With Peter Brötzmann
1993	May	Asian Games	With Ryuichi Sakamoto and Yōsuke Yamashita
1994	Feb	Outland	With Pete Namlook
1994	Apr	Psychonavigation	With Pete Namlook
1994	Jul	Cymatic Scan	With Tetsu Inoue
1994	Aug	Visitation	With Jonah Sharp
1995	Jan	Web	With Terre Thaemlitz
1995	Mar	Somnific Flux	With Mick Harris
1995	Mar	Subsonic 2: Bass Terror	With Nicholas Bullen
1995	May	Psychonavigation 2	With Pete Namlook
1996	Feb	Interpieces Organization	With Haruomi Hosono
1996	Apr	Outland 2	With Pete Namlook
1997	Feb	Psychonavigation 3	With Pete Namlook
1997	Aug	Dub Meltdown	With Style Scott
1998	Apr	Outland 3	With Pete Namlook
1999	Apr	Psychonavigation 4	With Pete Namlook
1999	Jun	Charged	With Eraldo Bernocchi and Toshinori Kondo
2000	Feb	Outland IV	With Pete Namlook
2001	Apr	Life Space Death	With Toshinori Kondo
2001	Sep	Radioaxiom: A Dub Transmission	With Jah Wobble
2002	Apr	Psychonavigation 5	With Pete Namlook
2003	Nov	Buck Jam Tonic	With Tatsuya Nakamura and John Zorn
2003	Dec	AFTERMATHematics	With Grand Mixer DXT
2003	Dec	Soup	With Yasuhiro Yoshigaki and Otomo Yoshihide
2004	May	A Navel City/No One Is There	With Hoppy Kamiyama
2004	Jun	Brutal Calling	With Submerged
2004	Sep	Soup Live	With Yasuhiro Yoshigaki and Otomo Yoshihide
2006	Apr	Episome	With Tatsuya Yoshida and Otomo Yoshihide
2007	Mar	Outland 5	With Pete Namlook
2007	Sep	Live at the Bowery Poetry Project	With Lance Carter and Robert Musso
2008	Mar	Lodge	With Fanu
2008	Aug	No Matter	With Kudsi Erguner, Mark Nauseef and Markus Stockhausen
2011	Mar	Bass & Drums	With Tatsuya Nakamura and Hideo Yamaki
2011	Mar	Konton	With Manabu Murata, Yoshi Otani and Munenori Senju
2011	Aug	Near Nadir	With Ikue Mori, Mark Nauseef and Evan Parker
2011	Oct	BLIXT	With Morgan Ågren and Raoul Björkenheim
2014	Sep	The Dream Membrane	With David Chaim Smith and John Zorn
2014	Nov	The Process	With Jonathan Batiste and Chad Smith
2016	Oct	Dubopera	With Masahiro Shimba
2021	May	Sacred Ceremonies	With Wadada Leo Smith and Milford Graves
2022	Jan	The Cleansing	With John Zorn
2022	May	Nammu	With Ulf Ivarsson
2023	May	Memoria	With John Zorn
2023	Aug	Breath Versus Beats	With Simon Berz and Toshinori Kondo

=== Remix albums ===
Year	Artist	Album
1991	Toshinori Kondo & IMA	In the '90s
1995	Boris Feoktistov	Russian Chants «Parastas»
1997	Bob Marley	Dreams of Freedom: Ambient Translations in Dub
1997	Bill Laswell	Oscillations Remixes
1998	Miles Davis	Panthalassa: The Music of Miles Davis 1969–1974
2000	Various Artists	Emerald Aether: Shape Shifting
2001	Carlos Santana	Divine Light: Music from Illuminations & Love Devotion Surrender
2002	Sussan Deyhim	Shy Angels
2003	Gigi	Illuminated Audio
2004	Lili Boniche	Boniche Dub II
2005	Bill Laswell	Trojan Dub Massive: Chapter One
2005	Bill Laswell	Trojan Dub Massive: Chapter Two
2006	Matisyahu	Youth Dub
2011	David Gould	Dub of the Passover

=== Cover albums ===
Year	Title
1998	Jazzonia

=== Compilation albums ===
Year	Title
1993	Deconstruction: The Celluloid Recordings
1994	Light in Extension
1996	Ambient Compendium
1996	Altered Beats - Assassin Knowledges of the Remanipulated
2003	Final Oscillations
2003	ROIR Dub Sessions
2011	Aspiration

=== Soundtracks ===
Year	Title	Notes
1999	Broken Vessels	Official soundtrack to the film, Broken Vessels

=== Singles ===
Year	Title	Album
1984	"Work Song"	Baselines
1998	"Moody's Mood for Love"	Non-album singles
2003	"Photo Op Before a Long Hard Fuck"	Non-album singles
2005	Todd Bridges on Lockdown/Summary Execution	Non-album singles

=== Axiom series ===
Title	Album details
Axiom Ambient: Lost in the Translation	Released: November 8, 1994 (US); Label: Axiom; Formats: CD
Axiom Funk: Funkcronomicon	Released: July 18, 1995 (US); Label: Axiom; Formats: CD
Axiom Dub: Mysteries of Creation	Released: October 22, 1996 (US); Label: Axiom; Formats: CD

== As a band member ==
Studio albums

Year	Month	Band	Release
1979	—	New York Gong	About Time
1979	—	Material	Temporary Music 1 (EP)
1980	—	Material	Temporary Music 2 (EP)
1981	—	Curlew	Curlew
1981	June	Material	American Songs (EP)
1981	—	Material	Memory Serves
1981	Sep	Massacre	Killing Time
1982	May	Material	One Down
1983	May	The Golden Palominos	The Golden Palominos
1984	Aug	Praxis	1984 (EP)
1985	May	Deadline	Down by Law
1985	—	The Golden Palominos	Visions of Excess
1986	Feb	The Golden Palominos	Blast of Silence
1988	—	Last Exit	Iron Path
1989	Jan	The Golden Palominos	A Dead Horse
1989	—	Material	Seven Souls
1990	—	Mooko	Mooko
1991	—	Autonomous Zone	The Map Is Not the Territory
1991	—	Deadline	Dissident
1991	Sep	Painkiller	Guts of a Virgin (EP)
1991	Sep	The Golden Palominos	Drunk with Passion
1991	—	Material	The Third Power
1992	Sep	Praxis	Transmutation (Mutatis Mutandis)
1992	—	Praxis	A Taste of Mutation
1992	Nov	Painkiller	Buried Secrets (EP)
1992	—	RAF	Ode to a Tractor
1993	Sep	The Golden Palominos	This Is How It Feels
1993	Dec	Material	Hallucination Engine
1993	—	Praxis	Sacrifist
1994	Aug	Praxis	Metatron
1994	Oct	The Golden Palominos	Pure
1994	Nov	Painkiller	Execution Ground
1994	—	Blind Light	The Absence of Time
1995	—	Flying Mijinko Band	Central Asian Tour
1995	—	Second Nature	Second Nature
1995	—	Third Rail	South Delta Space Age
1995	—	Somma	Somma I: Hooked Light Rays
1996	Jul	Arcana	The Last Wave
1996	Oct	The Golden Palominos	Dead Inside
1996	—	Equations of Eternity	Equations of Eternity
1997	Oct	Arcana	Arc of the Testimony
1998	Aug	Praxis	Mold
1998	Oct	Massacre	Funny Valentine
1998	Nov	Equations of Eternity	Vevè
1998	Dec	Ekstasis	Wake Up and Dream
1999	Mar	Purple Trap	Decided...
1999	Aug	Cobra Strike	The 13th Scroll
1999	Sep	Material	Intonarumori
1999	—	Shin Terai	Unison
2000	Sep	Tabla Beat Science	Tala Matrix
2000	Oct	Cobra Strike	Cobra Strike II: Y, Y+B, X+Y <hold> ?
2002	Jun	U.M.A.	Ja-ck
2004	Feb	Shine	Heaven & Hell
2006	Feb	Method of Defiance	The Only Way To Go Is Down
2007	Jun	Shine	Lightyears
2007	Sep	Method of Defiance	Inamorata
2008	Jan	Praxis	Profanation
2008	Nov	Activities of Dust	A New Mind
2010	Feb	Somma	23 Wheels of Dharma
2010	Apr	The Blood of Heroes	The Blood of Heroes
2010	Oct	Method of Defiance	Jahbulon
2010	Nov	Method of Defiance	Incunabula
2011	Oct	Method of Defiance	Dub Arcanum Arcandrum
2013	Apr	Massacre	Love Me Tender
2013	Apr	Method of Defiance	Nahariama

Live albums

Year	Month	Band	Release
1986	—	Last Exit	Last Exit
1986	—	Last Exit	The Noise of Trouble
1987	Mar	Last Exit	Cassette Recordings '87
1987	—	SXL	SXL Live in Japan
1988	—	SXL	Into the Outlands
1990	—	Last Exit	Köln
1991	—	Material	Improvised Music New York 1981
1992	—	Mooko	Japan Concerts
1993	—	Painkiller	Rituals
1993	—	Last Exit	Headfirst into the Flames
1993	—	Material	Live in Japan
1994	—	Material	Live from Soundscape
1997	—	Praxis	Live in Poland
1997	Oct	Praxis	Transmutation Live
1999	Feb	Praxis	Warszawa
2001	Nov	Massacre	Meltdown
2002	Jul	Tabla Beat Science	Live in San Francisco at Stern Grove
2002	Nov	Painkiller	Talisman
2005	Sep	Painkiller	50th Birthday Celebration Volume 12
2007	May	Massacre	Lonely Heart
2007	Jun	Praxis	Tennessee 2004
2007	Jul	Somma	Live for the Dalai Lama
2009	Jul	Method of Defiance	Nihon
2010	Nov	Material	Mesgana Ethiopia
2013	Nov	Painkiller	The Prophecy

Compilation albums

Year	Month	Band	Release
1981	—	Material	Temporary Music
1985	—	Material	Red Tracks
1986	—	Material	Secret Life
1990	—	Last Exit	Best of Live
1991	Jan	The Golden Palominos	Thundering Herd
1992	Jul	The Golden Palominos	A History (1982-1985)
1992	Jul	The Golden Palominos	A History (1986-1989)
1997	Jul	The Golden Palominos	The Best of The Golden Palominos
1997	—	The Golden Palominos	The Best of The Golden Palominos 1983-1989
1997	—	Painkiller	Painkiller: The Collected Works
1998	Jul	Praxis	Collection
1998	—	Material	The Best of Material
1998	—	Painkiller	Buried Secrets/Guts of a Virgin
2000	Jan	The Golden Palominos	Surrealistic Surfer
2002	Jun	The Golden Palominos	Run Pony Run: An Essential Collection
2005	—	The Golden Palominos	The Golden Palominos
2006	Mar	The Golden Palominos	The Celluloid Collection

== Bass guitar credits ==
Year	Artist	Release	Song(s)
1978	Michael Blaise and Cheater	Scoring Power (7")	"Scoring Power"
1981	Brian Eno and David Byrne	My Life in the Bush of Ghosts	"America Is Waiting"
1981	Fred Frith	Speechless	—
1981	Kip Hanrahan	Coup de tête	"Whatever I Want", "This Night Comes Out of Both of Us", "India Song", "Shadow to Shadow"
1981	Elliott Sharp	Moving Info (CS)	—
1981	John Zorn	Archery	—
1982	PHASE 2	The Roxy (12")	—
1982	Elliott Sharp	Ism	"Surdification", "Filter", "Just Like Here"
1982	Elliott Sharp	Nots	"TMI", "Obvious", "Surdification", "Just Like Here", "Filter"
1982	Brian Eno	Ambient 4: On Land	"Lizard Point"
1982	Daevid Allen	Divided Alien Playbax 80	—
1982	Love of Life Orchestra	Casino	—
1982	Jill Kroesen	Stop Vicious Cycles	"Wayne Hayes Blues", "I Am Not Seeing That You Are Here", "Ride Your Pony", "I'm Sorry I'm Such a Weenie"
1982	Fab Five Freddy	Change the Beat (12")	—
1982	Tribe 2	What I Like (12")	—
1983	Daevid Allen	Alien in New York (12")	"Are You Ready", "Oo La La"
1983	D.St.	Crazy Cuts (12")	—
1983	Herbie Hancock	Future Shock	—
1983	Fred Frith	Cheap at Half the Price	"The Welcome"
1983	Nona Hendryx	Nona	"Run for Cover"
1983	Daniel Ponce	New York Now!	—
1983	Lenny White	Attitude	—
1984	Laurie Anderson	Mister Heartbreak	"Sharkey's Day", "Gravity's Angel", "Kokoku", "Excellent Birds", "Blue Lagoon", "Sharkey's Night"
1984	Herbie Hancock	Sound-System	"Hardrock", "Junku", "Sound-System"
1984	Herbie Hancock	Hardrock (12")	"Hardrock" (long ver.), "T.F.S."
1984	David Moss	Full House	"Tunes", "3-Way Switch"
1984	Genji Sawai	Sowaka	—
1984	Shango	Shango Funk Theology	—
1984	Time Zone	World Destruction	—
1984	Tom Verlaine	Cover	"Miss Emily"
1984	Yellowman	King Yellowman	"Strong Me Strong", "Disco Reggae"
1984	Yla-Mago	TYO-Rock (12")	—
1985	Afrika Bambaataa	Kick Out the Jams (7")	—
1985	B-Side	Cairo Nights	"Change the Beat", "What I Like (American Dreams)"
1985	Mick Jagger	She's the Boss	"Lonely at the Top", "Just Another Night"
1985	Toshinori Kondo & IMA	China Boogie (12")	—
1986	Public Image Ltd	Album	"F.F.F.", "Rise", "Fishing", "Round", "Bags", "Home"
1986	Laurie Anderson	Home of the Brave	"Credit Racket"
1986	Ginger Baker	Horses & Trees	"Interlock", "Dust to Dust", "Uncut"
1986	Peter Gabriel	So	"This Is the Picture (Excellent Birds)"
1986	Toshinori Kondo & IMA	Konton	—
1986	Meltable Snaps It	Points Blank	"Chigger Reel", "Crake", "Mike Me", "Points Blank"
1986	The Stalin	Fish Inn	—
1987	The Epidemics	Do What U Do	—
1987	Ryuichi Sakamoto	Neo Geo	—
1987	Sonny Sharrock	Seize the Rainbow	"Sheraserhead's High-Top Sneakers"
1987	James Blood Ulmer	America – Do You Remember the Love?	—
1988	Afrika Bambaataa	The Light	"Clean Up Your Act", "Zouk Your Body", "World Racial War"
1988	Gettovetts	Missionaries Moving	—
1988	James Blood Ulmer	Wings	—
1989	Menace	Doghouse	—
1989	Robert Musso	Absolute Music	"Surakarta"
1989	Nicky Skopelitis	Next to Nothing	—
1989	Swans	The Burning World	—
1989	Swans	Saved (12")	—
1990	Akira Sakata	Mooko	—
1990	Ginger Baker	Middle Passage	—
1990	Bootsy's Rubber Band	Jungle Bass	—
1990	Fred Frith	Step Across the Border	—
1990	Niels & The New York Street Percussionists	Niels & The New York Street Percussionists	—
1990	Mandingo	New World Power	—
1990	Minako Yoshida	Gazer	"Gazer", "Silencer"
1991	Valentina Ponomaryova	Live in Japan	"Gotanda U-Port Hall I"
1991	Akira Sakata	Silent Plankton	—
1992	Masabumi Kikuchi	Dreamachine	—
1992	Robert Musso	Active Resonance	"A Dream Supreme", "Alliance", "All Funked Up", "Tanar!", "To Cross the Rubicon", "Ancient Silk Road", "The Squidge", "A Late One"
1992	Hector Zazou	Sahara Blue	"I'll Strangle You", "Lettre au Directeur des Messageries Maritimes"
1993	Aisha Kandisha's Jarring Effects	Shabeesation	"A Muey a Muey", "Dunya", "Fin Roh", "Nbrik", "Nbrik" (dub version), "El Harb"
1993	Anton Fier	Dreamspeed	—
1993	Umar Bin Hassan	Be Bop or Be Dead	—
1993	Icehouse	Big Wheel (12")	"Big Wheel" (Bill Laswell mix)
1993	Icehouse	Big Wheel	"Melt Steel" (Parts 1-3)
1993	The Last Poets	Black and Strong (Homesick) (12")	—
1993	The Last Poets	Holy Terror	—
1993	F. Robert Lloyd	Think About Brooklyn	"Blind Willie", "Waltzing Kate", "Lullaby You", "Bloody Buddy Rumba", "Four Lives in a Day Suite", "Proverbs From Hell", "True Man Coyote", "La Femme Bachir"
1993	Nicky Skopelitis	Ekstasis	"Meet Your Maker", "Ghost of a Chance", "One Eye Open", "Telling Time"
1993	Hideo Yamaki	Shadow Run	—
1993	Yothu Yindi	Freedom	—
1994	The Beatniks	Another High Exit	"Mirrors" (Bill Laswell Alien Mind-Screen mix)
1994	Hakim Bey	T.A.Z.	—
1994	Buckethead	Giant Robot	"Doomride", "Want Some Slaw?", "Binge and Grab", "Robot Transmission", "Post Office Buddy", "Last Train to Bucketheadland"
1994	Death Cube K	Dreamatorium	—
1994	Masters of None	Stained Glass Sky	"Seven Headed Queen", "Forever Came Today", "Legends of America", "80 Worlds", "Preincarnation"
1994	Monday Michiru	Groovement	"Is This How It Feels"
1994	Transonic	Downstream Illusion	—
1994	Transonic	Virtual Current	—
1994	Vodû 155	Vodû 155	"Zaka", "Tak This Tak That", "Feel No Evil"
1994	Zoopadelica feat. Menace	The Life and Times of One Chocolate Baby	"Secret"
1995	A.P.C.	APC Tracks Vol. 1	—
1995	Ahlam	Acting Salam	"Tkelemti", "Ash Men Hila", "Irfiq Rak 2", "Mashi"
1995	Cypher 7	Security	"Message Important"
1995	Aïyb Dieng	Rhythmagick	—
1995	Emergency Broadcast Network	Telecommunication Breakdown	"Electronic Behavior Control System", "Electronic Behavior Control" (System Ver. 2.0)
1995	Haruomi Hosono	N.D.E.	"Navigations", "Edge of the End"
1995	Abiodun Oyewole	25 Years	—
1995	Julian Schnabel	Every Silver Lining Has a Cloud	—
1995	Transonic	Future Primitive	—
1995	John Zorn	Filmworks III: 1990–1995	"France", "USA"
1996	A.P.C.	APC Tracks Vol. 2	—
1996	Argan	Berberism	"Tibdit"
1996	Ashes	Corpus	—
1996	Buckethead	The Day of the Robot	—
1996	Niels Jensen & Jonas Hellborg	Ordinary Day	—
1996	Jali Kunda	Griots of West Africa & Beyond	"Lanmbasy Dub"
1996	Russell Mills	Undark	—
1996	The Dark Side of the Moog	The Dark Side of the Moog 4	"Part I", "Part II", "Part III", "Part V", "Part VIII"
1996	The Dark Side of the Moog	The Dark Side of the Moog 5	"Part III", "Part VII"
1996	Paul Schütze + Phantom City	Site Anubis	"Future Nights", "An Early Mutation", "Blue Like Petrol", "Ten Acre Ghost", "Eight Legs Out of Limbo"
1996	Stina Nordenstam	The Photographer's Wife	—
1996	Trawl	Trawl (12")	—
1997	Lori Carson	Everything I Touch Runs Wild	"Something's Got Me", "Something's Got Me" (Curse of the Voodoo Swamp extended mix), "Something's Got Me" (Homegrown Fantasy mix), "Something's Got Me" (Instant Drip Hop mix)
1997	Chakra	Seven Centers	—
1997	Death Cube K	Disembodied	—
1997	Elixir	Hegalien Zone	"Automation Required", "Voyage Orientis", "Humans Being Human", "Etherus Athirst C2 H50 CD H5"
1997	Chaba Fadela & Cheb Sahraoui	Walli	—
1997	The Last Poets	Time Has Come	—
1997	Paul Schütze + Phantom City	Shiva Recoil: Live/Unlive	—
1997	Bernie Worrell	Free Agent: A Spaced Odyssey	"AfroFuturism (Phazed One)", "In Pursuit"
1998	Almamegretta	Lingo	"47", "Black Athena", "Berberia"
1998	A.P.C.	On Goes the Beat/Oriental Disco (12")	"Oriental Disco"
1998	Lili Boniche	Alger Alger	—
1998	Lili Boniche	Boniche Dub	—
1998	Buckethead	Colma	"Machete"
1998	Cypher 7	Nothing Lasts	"Message Important"
1998	Dubadelic	Bass Invaders	—
1998	Dub Syndicate	Fear of a Green Planet	—
1998	Enzo Gragnaniello	Neapolis mantra	"Il Viaggio del Sole" (remix)
1998	Jivamukti Yoga Center	Basic Yoga Class	—
1998	The Men Xperience	La Mancha Negra: The Black Stain	"End the Sin", "Backdoor"
1998	Meridiem	Meridiem	—
1998	Mœbius	Creatore di Universi	—
1998	Nia Monet	Laissez Faire	"Secrets of Life"
1998	Professor Shehab & Robert Musso	Ataxia	—
1998	Sapho	Digital Sheikha	"Sois Plus Radical", "Laouah", "Petit Demon", "Dabayji"
1998	Talvin Singh	OK	"Soni"
1999	Percy Howard	Incidental Seductions	"Succubus"
1999	Russell Mills	Innermedium	—
1999	O Rappa	Lado B Lado A	—
1999	DJ Cheb i Sabbah	Shri Durga	"Shri Durga", "Kese Kese", "Mere Kaku", "Gangta Dev"
1999	Jah Wobble	Deep Space	"Disks, Winds and Veiling Curtains"
1999	John Zorn	Taboo & Exile	"Sacrifist", "Thaalapalassi", "The Possessed"
2000	Sting	Brand New Day: The Remixes	"A Thousand Years" (Bill Laswell remix)
2001	Gigi	Gigi	—
2001	Herbie Hancock	Future 2 Future	—
2001	Robert Miles	Organik	"Release Me", "Improvisations" (Parts 1 & 2)
2001	Qaballah Steppers	Imaginatrix	"Automation", "Last Exit"
2001	Akira Sakata	Fisherman's.com	—
2001	James Blood Ulmer	Blue Blood	—
2002	Robert Musso	Axiomatic	"For the Sky to Clear"
2002	DJ Cheb i Sabbah	Krishna Lila	"Narajanma Bandage", "Maname Diname", "Raja Vedalu", "Lagi Lagan", "Rupa Tujhe Deva"
2002	Jah Wobble's Solaris	Live in Concert	—
2002	John Zorn	IAO	—
2003	Audio Leter	Neti-Neti	"Liberation from Samsara"
2003	Lili Haydn	Light Blue Sun	"Light Blue Sun (Prelude)", "Anything", "Wounded Dove", "The Longing", "The Chinese Song", "Seek", "Anything" (Radio edit)
2003	Karsh Kale	Liberation	"Milan"
2003	Lucky Peterson	Black Midnight Sun	—
2003	Pharoah Sanders/Graham Haynes	With a Heartbeat	—
2004	Azzddine	Massafat	—
2004	Gigi	Gold & Wax	—
2004	Meridiem	A Pleasant Fiction	—
2004	Kankawa 122	Greatfull Remixers	"Limbic System" (Bill Laswell mix)
2004	Ustad Sultan Khan	Rare Elements	—
2005	Cheb i Sabbah	La Kahena	—
2005	Sound Tribe Sector 9	Artifact: Perspectives	"Tokyo Shinjuku" (Flashback mix)
2006	Ashes	Unisono	—
2006	D. Rad	Il Lato D	"Estrazione" (Electric Heater mix)
2006	GOMA	Soul of Rite	—
2006	Akiko Grace	Illume	—
2006	Maghrebika	Neftakhir	—
2006	DJ Cheb i Sabbah	La Ghibra	—
2006	Samsara Sound System	Tales of the Red Dawn	"Dawn at the Devils Tower", "Round the Corner"
2007	Dorian Cheah	ARA	—
2007	Raiz	Uno	—
2007	Sigillum S	23/20	—
2007	Submerged	Stars Lights the End	—
2008	Sussan Deyhim	Out of Faze	"Maze" (remix), "Tell Me" (remix)
2008	HiM	1110	"Sikyi Rock"
2008	Kasbah Rockers	Kasbah Rockers	"Hikayati", "Bred Atay", "Al Rafel", "Bledstyle", "Mafi Tika", "Fikou", "Hellou Al Biban", "Hashouma", "Shems", "Rassoul Al Houda"
2008	Toy Killers	The Unlistenable Years	"Smokey Raindrops", "Green Dolphin Sweet", "Corrugated Gems of Woe", "Bleed for the Mind", "The Devil May Be Your Santa Claus" (studio version)
2009	Martin Bisi	Son of a Gun (EP)	"Mile High - Apple of My Eye"
2009	Death Cube K	Torn From Black Space	—
2009	Jai Uttal and The Pagan Love Orchestra	Thunder Love	"Adonai"
2010	Sussan Deyhim	City of Leaves	"Searching for You"
2010	Tomás Doncker	Small World	"Conscience of the World" (Bill Laswell mix)
2010	Garrison Hawk	Livin' the Genocide	"Gangsta Roll" (Bill Laswell mix)
2011	Tomás Doncker	Power of the Trinity	"Conscience of the World", "Peace Is Not Fiction"
2011	Lee "Scratch" Perry	Rise Again	—
2012	John Zorn	Nosferatu	—
2015	Samuel Claiborne	Love, Lust, and Genocide	"The Heart Is A Bomb"
2015	"—" denotes a credit for the entire release.		

== Production credits ==
Year	Artist	Release	Role(s)	Song(s)	
1984	Laurie Anderson	Mister Heartbreak	Producer	"Sharkey's Day", "Kokoku", "Sharkey's Night"	
1984	Jalal Mansur Nuriddin & D.St.	Mean Machine (12")	Producer	—	
1984	Herbie Hancock	Sound-System	Producer	—	
1984	Toshinori Kondo & IMA	Taihen	Mixing	—	
1984	Fela Kuti	Army Arrangement	Producer, Remixing	—	
1984	Gil Scott-Heron	Re-Ron (12")	Producer	—	
1985	Afrika Bambaataa	Kick Out the Jams (7")	Producer	"Kick Out the Jams"	
1985	Manu Dibango	Electric Africa	Producer	—	
1985	Herbie Hancock and Foday Musa Suso	Village Life	Producer	—	
1985	Ronald Shannon Jackson	Decode Yourself	Producer	—	
1985	Mick Jagger	She's the Boss	Producer	—	
1985	Toshinori Kondo & IMA	China Boogie (12")	Co-producer	—	
1985	The Last Poets	Oh My People	Producer	—	
1985	Touré Kunda	Natalia	Producer	—	
1985	Sly and Robbie	Language Barrier	Producer	—	
1985	Yoko Ono	Starpeace	Producer	—	
1986	Public Image Ltd	Album	Producer	—	
1986	Ginger Baker	Horses & Trees	Producer	—	
1986	Manu Dibango	Makossa '87 (Big Blow) (12")	Producer	—	
1986	Peter Gabriel	In Your Eyes (12")	Producer	—	
1986	Toshinori Kondo & IMA	Konton	Producer	—	
1986	Motörhead	Orgasmatron	Producer	—	
1986	Sonny Sharrock	Guitar	Producer	—	
1986	The Stalin	Fish Inn	Producer	—	
1987	Mandingo feat. Foday Musa Suso	Watto Sitta	Producer	—	
1987	Motörhead	Rock 'n' Roll	Producer, engineering	"Eat the Rich"	
1987	Ryuichi Sakamoto	Neo Geo	Producer	—	
1987	Sonny Sharrock	Seize the Rainbow	Producer	—	
1987	Sly and Robbie	Rhythm Killers	Producer	—	
1987	James Blood Ulmer	America – Do You Remember the Love?	Producer	—	
1988	Afrika Bambaataa	The Light	Producer	"Clean Up Your Act", "Zouk Your Body", "World Racial War"	
1988	Blind Idiot God	Undertow	Producer	—	
1988	Bootsy Collins	What's Bootsy Doin'?	Producer	"Shock-It-To-Me"	
1988	Gettovetts	Missionaries Moving	Producer	—	
1988	Herbie Hancock	Perfect Machine	Producer	—	
1988	Ronald Shannon Jackson	Texas	Producer, mixing	—	
1988	Iggy Pop	Instinct	Producer	—	
1988	Samulnori	Record of Changes	Producer	—	
1989	Menace	Doghouse	Producer	—	
1989	Ramones	Brain Drain	Producer	—	
1989	Nicky Skopelitis	Next to Nothing	Producer	—	
1989	Foday Musa Suso	Julu Kemo	Producer	—	
1989	Swans	The Burning World	Producer	—	
1989	Swans	Saved (12")	Producer	"Saved", "See No More" (acoustic ver.)	
1989	White Zombie	Make Them Die Slowly	Producer	—	
1989	Stevie Salas	Colorcode	Producer	—	
1990	Akira Sakata	Mooko	Producer	—	
1990	Ginger Baker	Middle Passage	Producer	—	
1990	Bootsy's Rubber Band	Jungle Bass	Producer	—	
1990	Gnawa Music of Marrakesh	Night Spirit Masters	Producer	—	
1990	Ronald Shannon Jackson	Taboo	Producer	—	
1990	Ronald Shannon Jackson	Red Warrior	Producer	—	
1990	Limbomaniacs	Stinky Grooves	Producer	—	
1990	Mandingo	New World Power	Producer	—	
1990	Mandinka and Fulani Music of The Gambia	Ancient Heart	Producer	—	
1990	Maceo Parker	For All the King's Men	Producer	—	
1990	Simon Shaheen	The Music of Mohamed Abdel Wahab	Producer	—	
1990	Shankar	Soul Searcher	Producer	—	
1990	Foday Musa Suso	The Dreamtime	Producer	—	
1990	Bernie Worrell	Funk of Ages	Producer	"Volunteered Slavery/Bern's Blues/Outer Spaceways", "At Mos'Spheres"	
1991	Apollo Smile	Apollo Smile	Remixing	"Thunder Box"	
1991	F.F.F.	Blast Culture	Producer	—	
1991	Jonas Hellborg	The Word	Producer	—	
1991	Akira Sakata	Silent Plankton	Producer	—	
1991	Sonny Sharrock	Ask the Ages	Producer	—	
1991	Nicky Skopelitis/Sonny Sharrock	Faith Moves	Producer	—	
1991	X-Legged Sally	Slow-Up	Producer	—	
1992	Bahia Black	Ritual Beating System	Producer	—	
1992	Bachir Attar	The Next Dream	Producer	—	
1992	Blind Idiot God	Cyclotron	Producer	—	
1992	Bomb	Hate Fed Love	Producer	—	
1992	Hardware	Third Eye Open	Producer	—	
1992	Icehouse	Masterfile	Producer, mixing	"Love in Motion", "Byrralku Dhangudha"	
1992	Masabumi Kikuchi	Dreamachine	Producer	—	
1992	The Master Musicians of Jajouka	Apocalypse Across the Sky	Producer	—	
1992	N-Factor	Paradigmashift	Mixing	—	
1992	Talip Özkan	The Dark Fire	Producer	—	
1992	Simon Shaheen	Turath (Heritage)	Producer	—	
1993	Aisha Kandisha's Jarring Effects	Shabeesation	Producer	"A Muey a Muey", "Dunya", "Fin Roh", "Nbrik", "Nbrik" (dub version), "El Harb"	
1993	William S. Burroughs	Words of Advice for Young People (12")	Remixing	"Interzone" (radio edit), "Mutatis Mutandis" (radio edit), "Interzone" (extended mix), "Mutatis Mutandis - Lemurs In the Mist" (Interzone mix), "Mutatis Mutandis" (mix)	
1993	George Clinton	Hey, Man, Smell My Finger	Co-producer	"Maximumisness"	
1993	Icehouse	Spin One (12")	Producer	"Byrralku Dhangudha"	
1993	Icehouse	Big Wheel (12")	Producer	"Big Wheel" (Bill Laswell mix)	
1993	Icehouse	Big Wheel	Producer	"Slow Motion", "The Great Southern Mix"	
1993	The Last Poets	Black and Strong (Homesick) (12")	Producer	—	
1993	The Last Poets	Holy Terror	Producer	—	
1993	O.G. Funk	Out of the Dark	Producer	—	
1993	Nicky Skopelitis	Ekstasis	Producer	—	
1993	Soon E MC	O.P.I.D. (12")	Producer, remix	—	
1993	Henry Threadgill	Too Much Sugar for a Dime	Producer	—	
1993	Bernie Worrell	Pieces of Woo: The Other Side	Producer	—	
1993	Bernie Worrell	Blacktronic Science	Producer	—	
1993	X-Legged Sally	Killed By Charity	Producer	—	
1993	Hideo Yamaki	Shadow Run	Producer	—	
1993	Yothu Yindi	Freedom	Producer	"World of Innocence", "Baywara", "Mabo", "Yolngu Boy"	
1993	Zillatron	Lord of the Harvest	Producer	—	
1994	Azonic	Halo	Producer	—	
1994	The Beatniks	Another High Exit	Producer, remix	"Mirrors" (Bill Laswell Alien Mind-Screen mix)	
1994	Hakim Bey	T.A.Z.	Producer	—	
1994	Buckethead	Giant Robot	Producer	—	
1994	Cypher 7	Decoder	Producer	—	
1994	Death Cube K	Dreamatorium	Producer	—	
1994	Mahmoud Guinia	The Trance of the Seven Colors	Producer	—	
1994	King Cobb Steelie	Project Twinkle	Producer	—	
1994	Mephiskapheles	God Bless Satan	Producer	—	
1994	Buddy Miles Express	Hell and Back	Producer	—	
1994	Slave Master	Under the Six	Producer	—	
1994	Liu Sola	Blues in the East	Producer	—	
1994	Vodû 155	Vodû 155	Producer	"Vodu Funkadelic", "Zaka", "Tak This Tak That", "Feel No Evil"	
1994	Jah Wobble	The Sun Does Rise	Co-producer, mixing	"Om Namah Shiva" (Transformation of the Heart mix)	
1995	A.P.C.	APC Tracks Vol. 1	Producer	—	
1995	Ahlam	Acting Salam	Producer	"Tkelemti", "Ash Men Hila", "Irfiq Rak 2", "Mashi"	
1995	Paul Bowles	Baptism of Solitude	Producer	—	
1995	Justin K. Broadrick/Azonic	Subsonic 3: Skinner's Black Laboratories	Producer	"River Blindness", "Nine Tails"	
1995	Cypher 7	Security	Producer	—	
1995	Aïyb Dieng	Rhythmagick	Producer	—	
1995	Emergency Broadcast Network	Telecommunication Breakdown	Co-producer, mixing	"Shoot the Mac 10"	
1995	GOD	Appeal to Human Greed	Producer	"Bloodstream" (The Evening Redness in the West mix)	
1995	Haruomi Hosono	N.D.E.	Producer	"Navigations", "Edge of the End"	
1995	Mutiny	Aftershock 2005	Co-producer	—	
1995	Nicklebag	12 Hits and a Bump	Co-producer	—	
1995	Abiodun Oyewole	25 Years	Producer	—	
1995	Julian Schnabel	Every Silver Lining Has a Cloud	Producer	—	
1995	Scorn	Ellipsis	Remixing	"Night Ash Black" (Slow Black Underground River mix)	
1995	Henry Threadgill	Carry the Day	Producer	—	
1995	Henry Threadgill	Makin' a Move	Producer	—	
1995	Jah Wobble	Heaven and Earth	Producer	"Gone to Croatan", "Hit Me"	
1996	A.P.C.	APC Tracks Vol. 2	Producer	—	
1996	Ashes	Corpus	Producer, mixing	—	
1996	Buckethead	The Day of the Robot	Producer	—	
1996	Anne Clark	Letter of Thanks to a Friend (12")	Remixing	—	
1996	Kodo	Ibuki	Producer	—	
1996	Jali Kunda	Griots of West Africa & Beyond	Producer	—	
1996	Makyo	Rasa Bhava	Co-producer, mixing	"Devabandha"	
1996	Nûs	All The Vertical Angels	Producer	—	
1996	Stevie Salas	Color Code	Producer	—	
1996	Pharoah Sanders	Message from Home	Producer	—	
1996	Sonny Sharrock	Into Another Light	Producer	—	
1996	Liu Sola/Wu Man	China Collage	Producer	—	
1996	Trawl	Trawl (12")	Mixing	"Wireless" (Rupture mix)	
1997	Chakra	Seven Centers	Producer	—	
1997	George Clinton	Get Yo Ass in the Water and Swim Like Me (Single)	Producer	—	
1997	Death Cube K	Disembodied	Producer	—	
1997	Chaba Fadela & Cheb Sahraoui	Walli	Producer	—	
1997	The Last Poets	Time Has Come	Producer	—	
1997	Henry Threadgill & Make a Move	Where's Your Cup?	Producer	—	
1997	Jai Uttal and The Pagan Love Orchestra	Shiva Station	Mixing	—	
1997	Bernie Worrell	Free Agent: A Spaced Odyssey	Co-producer, mixing	—	
1998	A.P.C.	On Goes the Beat/Oriental Disco (12")	Producer	"Oriental Disco"	
1998	The Bogmen	Closed Captioned Radio	Producer	—	
1998	Lili Boniche	Alger Alger	Producer	—	
1998	Lili Boniche	Boniche Dub	Producer, mixing	—	
1998	Buckethead	Colma	Producer	"Machete"	
1998	Cypher 7	Nothing Lasts	Producer	—	
1998	Enzo Gragnaniello	Neapolis mantra	Remix	"Il Viaggio del Sole" (remix)	
1998	Jivamukti Yoga Center	Basic Yoga Class	Recording, mixing	—	
1998	The Men Xperience	La Mancha Negra: The Black Stain	Recording	—	
1998	Mœbius	Creatore di Universi	Recording	—	
1998	Naftule's Dream	Smash, Clap!	Mixing	—	
1998	Nûs	Inside Is the Only Way Out	Producer	—	
1998	Pharoah Sanders	Save Our Children	Producer	—	
1998	Sapho	Digital Sheikha	Producer, mixing	"Sois Plus Radical", "Laouah", "Petit Demon", "Dabayji"	
1999	A.P.C.	Havana Mood/Rhum and Bass	Producer	—	
1999	Buckethead	Monsters and Robots	Producer	"Night of the Slunk"	
1999	Laurel MacDonald	Wingspan	Remix	"A Wing & a Prayer" (Bill Laswell mix)	
1999	Medeski Martin & Wood	Combustication Remix EP	Remix	"Satan's Church of Hypnotized Logic" (Bill Laswell remix)	
1999	O Rappa	Lado B Lado A	Producer	"Lado B Lado A", "Na Palma Da Mão"	
1999	DJ Cheb i Sabbah	Shri Durga	Recording	—	
1999	Jah Wobble	Deep Space	Producer	"Disks, Winds and Veiling Curtains"	
2000	The Damage Manual	The Damage Manual	Mixing	"King Mob", "Denial", "Broadcasting", "Blame and Demand", "Damage Addict" (Laswell mix), "Stateless" (Laswell mix)	
2000	Enrico Macias	Enrico Experience	Remix	"L'oriental" (Laswell remix), "Le Violon de mon pére" (Laswell remix)	
2000	Millennium Project	Simulasticity	Mixing	—	
2000	Sting	Brand New Day: The Remixes	Remix	"A Thousand Years" (Bill Laswell remix)	
2001	A.P.C.	APC Dance: Ignore the Beat	Producer	—	
2001	Mari Boine	Remixed	Remix	"Maid Áiggot Muinna Eallin" (Bill Laswell remix)	
2001	Freeform	Audiotourism Reinterpretations: Vietnam and China	Remix	"Lost World"	
2001	Gonervill	Gonervill	Co-producer	—	
2001	Herbie Hancock	Future 2 Future	Producer	—	
2001	Nils Petter Molvær	Recoloured	Co-producer, mixing	"Merciful/Ligotage" (Incunabula mix)	
2001	Naftule's Dream	Job	Mixing	—	
2001	Akira Sakata	Fisherman's.com	Producer	—	
2001	Henry Threadgill	Everybodys Mouth's a Book	Mixing	—	
2001	Henry Threadgill	Up Popped the Two Lips	Recording, mixing	—	
2001	James Blood Ulmer	Blue Blood	Producer	—	
2001	2002	Karsh Kale	Redesign: Realize Remixed	Remix	"Empty Hands" (Bill Laswell mix)
Angélique Kidjo	2002	Black Ivory Soul	Producer	—	
Nils Petter Molvær	2002	Axis of Ignorance (12")	Remix	"Frozen" (Northern Light mix)	
Rovo	2002	Tonic 2001	Mixing	—	
DJ Cheb i Sabbah	2002	Krishna Lila	Recording	—	
Vida Blue	2002	Most Events Aren't Planned	Remix	"Most Events Aren't Planned" (Dreams of Tee Point mix)	
Satlah	2002	Children of Israel	Producer, mixing	—	
2003	Abyssinia Infinite	Zion Roots	Producer	—	
2003	Audio Leter	Neti-Neti	Remix	"Liberation from Samsara"	
2003	Lili Haydn	Light Blue Sun	Producer	"Light Blue Sun (Prelude)", "Come Here", "Wounded Dove", "Sweetness", "Seek", "Home", "The Promised Land"	
2003	Jon Madof	Rashanim	Mixing	—	
2003	Lucky Peterson	Black Midnight Sun	Producer	—	
2003	Pharoah Sanders/Graham Haynes	With a Heartbeat	Producer	—	
2003	Serj Tankian and Arto Tunçboyaciyan	Narina (12")	Remix	"Narina" (Bill Laswell mix)	
2004	Oz Fritz	All Around the World	Co-producer	—	
2004	Gigi	Gold & Wax	Producer	—	
2004	Kankawa 122	Greatfull Remixers	Remix	"Limbic System" (Bill Laswell mix)	
2004	Ryukyu Underground	Ryukyu Remixed	Remix	"Koi No Michi Kusa" (Bill Laswell mix)	
2004	Sly and Robbie	Version Born	Producer	—	
2004	Yulduz	Bilmadim	Remix	"Kiss Me" (Bill Laswell mix)	
2005	Buckethead	Enter the Chicken	Engineering	"Running from the Light"	
2005	Nils Petter Molvær	Remakes	Co-producer, remix	"Frozen"	
2005	Cheb i Sabbah	La Kahena	Recording	—	
2005	Sound Tribe Sector 9	Artifact: Perspectives	Remix	"Tokyo Shinjuku" (Flashback mix)	
2006	Ashes	Unisono	Mixing	—	
2006	D. Rad	Il Lato D	Remix	"Estrazione" (Electric Heater mix)	
2006	Akiko Grace	Illume	Producer	—	
2006	Matisyahu	Youth	Producer	—	
2006	Matisyahu	No Place to Be	Remix	"Jerusalem (Out of Darkness Comes Light)", "Chop 'em Down", "Warrior", "Message in a Bottle", "Message in a Bottle" (dub version)	
2006	Muddy World	Finery of the Storm	Mixing	—	
2006	Roots Tonic	Roots Tonic Meets Bill Laswell	Producer, mixing	—	
2006	DJ Cheb i Sabbah	La Ghibra	Recording	—	
2006	John Zorn	Moonchild: Songs Without Words	Mixing	—	
2006	John Zorn	Astronome	Mixing	—	
2007	Dorian Cheah	ARA	Producer	—	
2007	Nine Inch Nails	Y34RZ3R0R3M1X3D	Remix	"Vessel" (Bill Laswell mix)	
2007	Raiz	Uno	Mixing	—	
2007	John Zorn	Six Litanies for Heliogabalus	Recording, mixing	—	
2007	John Zorn	Asmodeus: Book of Angels Volume 7	Recording, mixing	—	
2008	Enzo Avitabile & Bottari	Festa Farina E Forca	Producer	"Mamm"	
2008	Anthony Braxton/Milford Graves/William Parker	Beyond Quantum	Producer, mixing	—	
2008	Sussan Deyhim	Out of Faze	Remix	"Bashad", "Maze" (remix)	
2008	Hal and The Big Five	Umoya	Mixing	—	
2009	Death Cube K	Torn From Black Space	Producer	—	
2009	Dr. Israel	Gangsta N Police (12")	Producer, mixing	—	
2009	The Project_Pale	Our Inventions and How They Fail Us	Mixing	—	
2009	Jai Uttal and The Pagan Love Orchestra	Thunder Love	Mixing	—	
2010	Beatundercontrol	Beatundercontrol in Dub	Remix	"Secrets of Fascination" (Bill Laswell mix)	
2010	Sussan Deyhim	City of Leaves	Producer	"Searching for You"	
2010	Tomas Doncker	Small World	Co-producer, remix	"Conscience of the World" (Bill Laswell mix)	
2010	Garrison Hawk	Livin' the Genocide	Remix	"Gangsta Roll" (Bill Laswell mix)	
2011	Animation	Agemo	Producer, remix	"Pharoah's Dance" (Son of Panthalassa remix)	
2011	Tomas Doncker	Power of the Trinity	Co-producer	—	
2011	Loud Apartment	Get Up Get Down	Mixing	—	
2011	Lee "Scratch" Perry	Rise Again	Producer	—	
2012	Dr. Israel	Ghetto Defendant	Mixing	—	
2012	Garrison Hawk	Survive	Producer	—	
2012	Jano	Ertale	Producer	—	
2012	Jano	Ertale	Mixing	—	
2012	Naked Truth	Ouroboros	Mixing	—	
2012	John Zorn	Nosferatu	Mixing	—	
2013	Higgins Waterproof Black Magic Band	Higgins Waterproof Black Magic Band (12")	Mixing	"Mad Lifeline"	
2013	Suphala	Alien Ancestry	Remix	"Vashikaran"	
2013	Bernie Worrell	Elevation: Upper Air	Producer	"World of Innocence", "Baywara", "Mabo", "Yolngu Boy"	
2013	Mumpbeak	Mumpbeak	Co-producer, mixing	—	
2014	Abraxas	Psychomagia	Mixing	—	
2014	Colin Edwin/Lorenzo Feliciati	Twinscapes	Mixing	—	
2014	Helio Parallax	Helio Parallax	Mixing	—	
2015	Blind Idiot God	Before Ever After	Producer	—	
"—" denotes a credit for the entire release.

== Other credits ==
Year	Artist	Release	Credit	Song(s)
1983	Nona Hendryx	Nona	Musical arrangements	—
1984	Jalal Mansur Nuriddin & D.St.	Mean Machine (12")	Shortwave	—
1984	Nona Hendryx	The Art of Defense	Tapes	"I Sweat", "The Life", "Electricity"
1984	Toshinori Kondo & IMA	Taihen	Tapes	—
1984	Genji Sawai	Sowaka	Musical arrangements	—
1984	Gil Scott-Heron	Re-Ron (12")	DMX, radio	—
1984	Time Zone	World Destruction	DMX	—
1984	Yla-Mago	TYO-Rock (12")	Tapes	—
1985	Manu Dibango	Electric Africa	DMX	"Pata Piya", "Echos Beti"
1985	Ronald Shannon Jackson	Decode Yourself	drum programming	"Decoding"
1985	The Last Poets	Oh My People	DMX	"Get Movin'"
1987	Mandingo feat. Foday Musa Suso	Watto Sitta	DMX programming	—
1990	Bootsy's Rubber Band	Jungle Bass	Musical arrangements	—
1993	Aisha Kandisha's Jarring Effects	Shabeesation	Effects, loops	"A Muey a Muey", "Dunya", "Fin Roh", "Nbrik", "Nbrik" (dub version), "El Harb"
1993	Bernie Worrell	Pieces of Woo: The Other Side	Samples, loops, effects	"Gladiator Skull", "Moon Over Brixton", "Judie's Passion Purple", "Fields of Play"
1993	Bernie Worrell	Blacktronic Science	Loops	"Flex", "Won't Go Away"
1993	Yothu Yindi	Freedom	Musical arrangements	"World of Innocence", "Baywara", "Mabo", "Yolngu Boy"
1993	Zillatron	Lord of the Harvest	Ambient sounds	—
1994	Azonic	Halo	Musical arrangements	—
1994	Hakim Bey	T.A.Z.	Musical arrangements	—
1994	Death Cube K	Dreamatorium	Musical arrangements, effects	—
1995	A.P.C.	APC Tracks Vol. 1	Effects	—
1995	Ahlam	Acting Salam	Musical arrangements	"Tkelemti", "Ash Men Hila", "Irfiq Rak 2", "Mashi"
1995	Paul Bowles	Baptism of Solitude	Musical arrangements	—
1995	Emergency Broadcast Network	Telecommunication Breakdown	Effects	"Electronic Behavior Control System", "Electronic Behavior Control" (System Ver. 2.0)
1995	Spectre	The Illness	Intro voice	"9th Secret Rule of the Order"
1996	A.P.C.	APC Tracks Vol. 2	Effects	—
1996	Argan	Berberism	Intro voice	"Tibdit"
1996	Ashes	Corpus	Musical arrangements	—
1996	Buckethead	The Day of the Robot	drums	—
1996	Dubadelic	2000: A Bass Odyssey	Samples, loops, effects	—
1996	Jali Kunda	Griots of West Africa & Beyond	Samples	"Lanmbasy Dub"
1996	Russell Mills	Undark	Drones	—
1996	The Dark Side of the Moog	The Dark Side of the Moog 4	Sound collage	"Part I", "Part II", "Part III", "Part V", "Part VIII"
1996	The Dark Side of the Moog	The Dark Side of the Moog 5	Effects	"Part III", "Part VII"
1996	Satori	Invisible Rhythm	Effects	"Relocations"
1997	Chakra	Seven Centers	Effects	—
1997	Chaba Fadela & Cheb Sahraoui	Walli	Effects	—
1997	The Last Poets	Time Has Come	Loops, effects	—
1997	The Dark Side of the Moog	The Dark Side of the Moog 6	Effects	"Part IV"
1997	Sri Hari	One But Different	Effects	—
1998	A.P.C.	On Goes the Beat/Oriental Disco (12")	Effects	"Oriental Disco"
1998	Lili Boniche	Alger Alger	Synthesizers	—
1998	Lili Boniche	Boniche Dub	Synthesizers	—
1998	Enzo Gragnaniello	Neapolis mantra	Effects	"Il Viaggio del Sole" (remix)
1998	Jivamukti Yoga Center	Basic Yoga Class	Effects	—
1998	Mœbius	Creatore di Universi	Samples, effects	—
1999	A.P.C.	Havana Mood/Rhum and Bass	Musical arrangements	—
2001	Gigi	Gigi	Guitar, synthesizer	—
2001	Nils Petter Molvær	Recoloured	Effects	"Merciful/Ligotage" (Incunabula mix)
2002	Buckethead	Funnel Weaver	Samples	—
2003	Abyssinia Infinite	Zion Roots	Musical arrangements, acoustic guitar, keyboards	—
2003	Pharoah Sanders/Graham Haynes	With a Heartbeat	Musical arrangements, keyboards, flute	—
2004	Gigi	Gold & Wax	Guitar, synthesizer	—
2004	Sly and Robbie	Version Born	Musical arrangements, guitar, keyboards	—
2006	D. Rad	Il Lato D	Effects	"Estrazione" (Electric Heater mix)
2006	Akiko Grace	Illume	Electronics	—
2008	Sussan Deyhim	Out of Faze	Programming	"Maze" (remix), "Tell Me" (remix)
2009	Death Cube K	Torn From Black Space	Effects	—
2011	Lee "Scratch" Perry	Rise Again	Effects	—
2012	Garrison Hawk	Survive	Musical arrangements, effects	—
"—" denotes a credit for the entire release.
