= Deconstruction: The Celluloid Recordings =

Compilation album by Bill Laswell
- Released: January 19, 1993
- Recorded: July 23, 1979 – January 6, 1987
- Genre: Art rock, avant-garde jazz, disco, dub, electro, free jazz, funk, hip hop, jazz-funk, jazz fusion, makossa, no wave, noise rock
- Length: 138:18
- Label: Restless
- Producer: Bill Laswell

Bill Laswell chronology
Hear No Evil (1988)	Deconstruction: The Celluloid Recordings (1993)	Asian Games (1993)

Professional ratings
Review scores
Source	Rating
Allmusic	4/5 stars
Entertainment Weekly	B+
Spin Alternative Record Guide	8/10

Deconstruction: The Celluloid Recordings is a compilation album by American composer Bill Laswell, released on January 19, 1993, by Restless Records. It comprises solo recordings alongside his work with artists such as Material, Massacre, Time Zone, Fab Five Freddy, Tour‚ Kunda, the Last Poets, Manu Dibango and Fela Kuti.

== Track listing ==
Disc one
No.	Title	Writer(s)	Artist (date)	Length
1.	"World Destruction"	Bambaataa, Laswell	Time Zone (1984)	5:33
2.	"Killing Time"	Frith, Laswell, Maher	Massacre (1981)	2:53
3.	"Mean Machine"	Nuriddin	Jalal Mansur Nuriddin & D.St. (1984)	4:42
4.	"Electric Africa"	Dibango, Laswell	Manu Dibango (1985)	10:23
5.	"Work Song"	Beinhorn, Laswell, Lewis	Bill Laswell (1983)	7:14
6.	"Memories"	Hopper	Material (1982)	4:02
7.	"Death Rattle"	Brötzmann, Laswell	Peter Brötzmann/Bill Laswell (1987)	4:28
8.	"Reduction"	Beinhorn, Laswell, Maher	Material (1980)	5:32
9.	"Uprising"	Laswell	Bill Laswell (1983)	1:07
10.	"Boat Peoples"	Dibango, Turre, Wilson	Deadline (1985)	7:07
11.	"For a Few Dollars More"	Morricone	Material (1984)	3:53
12.	"Get Movin'"	Hadi, Worrell	The Last Poets (1985)	6:41
13.	"Bustin' Out"	Beinhorn, Drayton, Hendryx, Laswell, Maher, Scott	Material (1981)	8:03

Disc two
No.	Title	Writer(s)	Artist (date)	Length
1.	"Oh My People"	Hadi	The Last Poets (1985)	7:34
2.	"Cross Examination"	Kuti	Fela Kuti (1984)	11:54
3.	"Interlock"	Laswell, Ponce, Skopelitis, Suso	Ginger Baker (1986)	4:54
4.	"Harima"	Suso	Mandingo feat. Foday Musa Suso (1987)	6:04
5.	"Locomotive"	Monk	Peter Brötzmann/Bill Laswell (1987)	3:43
6.	"Change the Beat"	Material, Zekri	Fab Five Freddy (1982)	7:40
7.	"Shango Messager"	Afrika Bambaataa, Material	Shango (1984)	7:44
8.	"Legs"	Frith, Laswell, Maher	Massacre (1981)	2:04
9.	"My Balls/Your Chin"	Brötzmann, Sharrock, Jackson, Laswell	Last Exit (1987)	2:27
10.	"Square Dance"	Frith, Laswell, Maher	Material (1981)	4:29
11.	"Natalia"	Touré Kunda	Touré Kunda (1985)	4:56
12.	"O.A.O."	Beinhorn, Cultreri, Laswell, Maher	Material (1979)	4:45

== Personnel ==
- Bill Laswell – bass guitar
- Robert Soares – compiling

== Release history ==
Region	Date	Label	Format	Catalog
United States	1993	Restless	CD	7 72665-2
Germany	1994	Celluloid	CD	CELD 5100
