= Third Eye Open =

Studio album by Hardware
- Released: November 26, 1992
- Recorded: 1992
- Genre: Rock/Funk
- Length: 52:36
- Label: Polystar (Japan), Rykodisc (U.S.)
- Producer: Bill Laswell, Stevie Salas

Third Eye Open is an album by American funk/rock supergroup Hardware. Hardware consists of lead guitarist Stevie Salas, P-Funk bassist Bootsy Collins, and drummer Buddy Miles, formerly of the Band of Gypsys. Released in 1992, the album was produced by Bill Laswell and Salas and was the first release to be part of Laswell's Black Arc Series, which includes Lord of the Harvest by Zillatron, Out of the Dark by O.G. Funk, and Under the 6 by Slave Master.

== Album history ==
When the album was first released in Japan on the Polystar label, the band was called The Third Eye and the name of the album was "Hardware". When the album secured distribution in the U.S., it was found that another band had owned the name "The Third Eye". To avoid any further legal hassles, it was opted that the title of the album and the name of band would simply be switched, thus the name of the band would be Hardware, and the title of the album became Third Eye Open.

The song "Leakin'" is a version of a track that appeared on Collins' 1988 album What's Bootsy Doin'?, which featured Salas playing guitar. On this album, the song is credited to Salas, whereas the previous version is credited to Collins, George Clinton and Trey Stone.

== Track listing ==
No.	Title	Writer(s)	Length
1.	"Got a Feelin'"	Stevie Salas, Buddy Miles	6:31
2.	"Waiting On You"	Miles	6:11
3.	"What's Goin' Down"	Salas	5:06
4.	"Love Obsession (When the Eagle Flies)"	Miles	4:32
5.	"Hard Look"	Salas, Miles, Bootsy Collins	6:07
6.	"Shake It"	Salas, Collins, David Friendly	4:28
7.	"The Walls Came Down"	Salas	4:15
8.	"500 Years"	Salas	5:43
9.	"Tell Me"	Salas	5:22
10.	"Leakin'"	Salas	4:21
Total length:			52:36

== Personnel ==
- Stevie Salas – guitars, vocals
- Bootsy Collins – space bass, vocals
- Buddy Miles – drums, fuzz bass, vocals
- George Clinton, Gary "Mudbone" Cooper, Bernard Fowler – background vocals
- David Friendly, Vince McClean, Matt Stein – digital bollocks
