= Lance Carter =

Lance Carter may refer to:

- Lance Carter (baseball)
- Lance Carter (musician)
