= Broken Vessels (soundtrack) =

Soundtrack album by Bill Laswell
- Released: September 21, 1999
- Studio: Orange Music (West Orange, N.J.)
- Genre: Ambient, drum and bass
- Length: 48:55
- Label: Koch Records
- Producer: Bill Laswell

Bill Laswell chronology
Imaginary Cuba (1999)	Broken Vessels (1999)	Permutation (1999)

Professional ratings
Review scores
Source	Rating
Allmusic	4/5 stars

Broken Vessels is the soundtrack album by American composer Bill Laswell, released on September 21, 1999, by Koch Records. It comprises Laswell's original score for the medical drama Broken Vessels, a film directed by Scott Ziehl released to theaters on April 18, 1998. Critic Steven McDonald called it "an engaging and propulsive recording."

== Track listing ==
All music is composed by Bill Laswell, except "Hands" co-written by Lori Carson.

No.	Title	Length
1.	"Broken Vessel"	5:37
2.	"ER"	3:17
3.	"Dementia"	2:57
4.	"Light Speed"	3:46
5.	"Strained"	4:52
6.	"High Ride"	2:07
7.	"Needle Drop"	2:32
8.	"Graveyard"	1:49
9.	"Smoking Up"	5:13
10.	"Explosion"	1:16
11.	"First Call"	5:40
12.	"Falling Under"	2:16
13.	"Lost Control"	2:47
14.	"Hands"	4:46
Total length:		48:55

== Personnel ==
Adapted from the Broken Vessels liner notes.

Musicians

- Lori Carson – vocals (14)
- Lance Carter – drums
- Bill Laswell – bass guitar, guitar, keyboards, sampler, percussion, musical arrangements, producer
- Nicky Skopelitis – guitar

Technical personnel

- Michael Fossenkemper – mastering
- Robert Musso – engineering, mixing

== Charts ==
Chart (1999)	Peak position
Canadian RPM Albums Chart	40

== Release history ==
Region	Date	Label	Format	Catalog
United States	1999	Koch	CD	KOC-CD-8055
Australia	1999	Take One	CD	TAKE014CD
