= Next to Nothing =

Next to Nothing may refer to:

- Next to Nothing (Rittz album)
- Next to Nothing (Nicky Skopelitis album)
- "Next to Nothing", song from The Golden Year by Ou Est le Swimming Pool
- "Next to Nothing", a song from Fatboy Slim's debut album Better Living Through Chemistry
- "Next to Nothing", a song by Died Pretty from the 1986 album Free Dirt
