= Bass & Drums =

Live album by Bill Laswell, Tatsuya Nakamura and Hideo Yamaki
- Released: March 2, 2011
- Recorded: September 3, 2010 at SuperDeluxe, Tokyo, Japan
- Genre: Free improvisation
- Length: 50:18
- Label: P-Vine
- Producer: Bill Laswell

Bill Laswell chronology
Invisible Design II (2009)	Bass & Drums (2011)	Konton (2011)

Bass & Drums is a collaborative album by Bill Laswell, Tatsuya Nakamura and Hideo Yamaki. It released on March 2, 2011, by P-Vine Records.

== Track listing ==
No.	Title	Writer(s)	Length
1.	"Kanazuchi One"	Bill Laswell, Tatsuya Nakamura	28:07
2.	"Kanazuchi Two"	Bill Laswell, Hideo Yamaki	15:37
3.	"Kanazuchi Three"	Bill Laswell, Tatsuya Nakamura, Hideo Yamaki	6:40

== Personnel ==
Adapted from the Bass & Drums liner notes.

Musicians

- Bill Laswell – bass guitar, producer
- Tatsuya Nakamura – drums (1, 3)
- Hideo Yamaki – drums (2, 3)

Technical personnel

- Masahide Ando – recording
- John Brown – design
- James Dellatacoma – mixing
- Michael Fossenkemper – mastering
- Robert Musso – mixing
- Hisaaki Oshima – engineering

== Release history ==
Region	Date	Label	Format	Catalog
Japan	2011	P-Vine	CD	PCD-25125
