= Permutation (Bill Laswell album) =

Studio album by Bill Laswell
- Released: November 30, 1999
- Recorded: Orange Music (West Orange, N.J.)
- Genre: Downtempo
- Length: 46:36
- Label: ION
- Producer: Bill Laswell

Bill Laswell chronology
Broken Vessels (1999)	Permutation (1999)	Outland IV (2000)

Professional ratings
Review scores
Source	Rating
Allmusic	3/5 stars
Pitchfork Media	(6.0/10)

Permutation is the tenth solo album by American composer Bill Laswell, released on November 30, 1999, by ION Records.

== Track listing ==
All music is composed by Bill Laswell.

No.	Title	Length
1.	"Encoded"	5:21
2.	"Acid Test"	8:29
3.	"Coma"	6:24
4.	"Perimeter"	5:39
5.	"Escape Clause"	4:40
6.	"Iron Black"	9:01
7.	"Scatter"	4:14
8.	"Enhanced"	2:48

== Personnel ==
Adapted from the Permutation liner notes.

Musicians

- Hassan Ibn Ali – sampler
- Lance Carter – drums
- Helios Creed – sampler
- Bill Laswell – bass guitar, guitar, keyboards, effects, drum programming, musical arrangements, producer
- Nicky Skopelitis – guitar

Technical personnel

- Michael Fossenkemper – mastering
- Robert Musso – engineering, programming

== Release history ==
Region	Date	Label	Format	Catalog
United States	1999	ION	CD	IN 2010-2
