= Aspiration (album) =

Compilation album by Bill Laswell
- Released: March 15, 2011
- Recorded: Greenpoint Studio, Brooklyn, NY; Orange Music, West Orange, NJ; The House of the Caid Khoubane, District Chbanat, Morocco
- Genre: Ambient
- Length: 48:05
- Label: Metastation
- Producer: Bill Laswell

Bill Laswell chronology
Konton (2011)	Aspiration (2011)	Near Nadir (2011)

Professional ratings
Review scores
Source	Rating
Allmusic	2.5/5 stars

Aspiration is a compilation album by American composer Bill Laswell, released on March 15, 2011, by Metastation.

== Track listing ==
No.	Title	Writer(s)	Length
1.	"Pattabhi Jois"	Bill Laswell	12:27
2.	"Bliss: The Eternal Now"	Alice Coltrane	7:47
3.	"Searching for You"	Sussan Deyhim, Kudsi Erguner, Bill Laswell, Mark Nauseef	7:03
4.	"The Hidden Garden/Naima"	John Coltrane, Bill Laswell, Simon Shaheen, Nicky Skopelitis	5:26
5.	"Time"	Bill Laswell	8:01
6.	"Peace in Essaouira" (for Sonny Sharrock)	Pharoah Sanders	7:21

== Personnel ==
Adapted from the Aspiration liner notes.

Musicians

- Jeff Bova – synthesizer (4)
- Bootsy Collins – bass guitar (4)
- Alice Coltrane – piano and harp (2), musical arrangements (2)
- Sussan Deyhim – vocals (3), musical arrangements (3)
- Aïyb Dieng – Ghatam, congas and percussion (4)
- Kudsi Erguner – ney (3)
- Jonas Hellborg – bass guitar (4)
- The Dalai Lama – voice (5)
- Zakir Hussain – tabla (1)
- K. Pattabhi Jois – chant (1)
- Toshinori Kondo – trumpet and electronics (5)
- Bill Laswell – bass guitar (1, 3, 4, 5), percussion (6), remix (2), producer
- Nils Petter Molvær – trumpet (1)
- Mark Nauseef – meditation bells (3)
- Pharoah Sanders – tenor saxophone (6)
- Carlos Santana – guitar (2)
- Simon Shaheen – oud and violin (4)
- Nicky Skopelitis – guitar, sitar and baglama (4), percussion (6)
- Bernie Worrell – electric piano and organ (4)

Technical personnel

- James Dellatacoma – assistant engineering
- Michael Fossenkemper – mastering
- Russell Mills – cover art
- Robert Musso – engineering

== Release history ==
Region	Date	Label	Format	Catalog
United States	2011	Metastation	CD	MT 0024
