= Episome (album) =

Studio album by Otomo Yoshihide/ Bill Laswell/Tatsuya Yoshida
- Released: April 18, 2006
- Recorded: December 2005 at Orange Music, West Orange, NJ
- Genre: Free improv, psychedelic rock
- Length: 59:04
- Label: Tzadik
- Producer: Bill Laswell

Bill Laswell chronology
Trojan Dub Massive: Chapter Two (2005)	Episome (2006)	Outland 5 (2007)

Professional ratings
Review scores
Source	Rating
Allmusic	3.5/5 stars

Episome is a collaborative album by Bill Laswell, Otomo Yoshihide and Tatsuya Yoshida. It was released on April 18, 2006 by Tzadik Records.

== Track listing ==
All music is composed by Bill Laswell.

No.	Title	Length
1.	"Fudge"	13:23
2.	"Layout"	14:31
3.	"Substantiality"	7:09
4.	"Spin"	9:44
5.	"Hedge"	14:17

== Personnel ==
Adapted from the Episome liner notes.

Musicians

- Bill Laswell – bass guitar, producer
- Otomo Yoshihide – guitar, vocals
- Tatsuya Yoshida – drums

Technical personnel

- Heung-Heung Chin – design
- Scott Hull – mastering
- Robert Musso – recording

== Release history ==
Region	Date	Label	Format	Catalog
United States	2006	Tzadik	CD	TZ 7263
