= Blasters of the Universe =

Studio album by Bootsy's New Rubber Band
- Released: 1993
- Recorded: 1993
- Genre: Funk; electro-funk
- Length: 114:20
- Label: P-Vine Records; Rykodisc Records
- Producer: Bootsy Collins

Bootsy's New Rubber Band chronology
Jungle Bass (1990)	Blasters of the Universe (1993)	Lord of the Harvest (1993)

Professional ratings
Review scores
Source	Rating
AllMusic	2/5 stars
Entertainment Weekly	B
IGN	8.5/10
Music Week	3/5 stars
Select	4/5 medals

Blasters of the Universe is a 1993 2-CD set by Bootsy's New Rubber Band. The album was first released on the P-Vine record label and then by Rykodisc in the US and the UK. In terms of musical personnel, the album features more P-Funk and Funk alumni than any other Bootsy Collins related release. It also contains one of the last tracks to feature original Parliament-Funkadelic guitarist Eddie Hazel, to whom the album is dedicated. The album also contains a lyric sheet and a comic book called "Back 'N' Dah Day: A Boot Tune Adventure".

== Track listing ==
Disc 1:

1. "Funk Express Card" (Bootsy Collins) 5:53
2. "J.R. (Just Right)" (Bootsy Collins, Bernie Worrell, Frankie Waddy, Don Davis) 6:48
3. "Blasters of the Universe" (Bootsy Collins, Fred Wesley, Maceo Parker, Richard Griffith, Rick Gardner) 6:45
4. "Bad Girls" (Bootsy Collins, Joel Johnson, Lawrence Cornett, Anthony Cole) 5:40
5. "Back-N-The Day" (Bootsy Collins, Phelps Collins, David Spradley, Maceo Parker) 6:16
6. "Where R The Children" (Bootsy Collins, Cynthia Girty, Tony Walker, Carolyn Stanford) 4:36
7. "Female Trouble's (The National Anthem)" (Bootsy Collins) 4:33
8. "Wide Track" (Bootsy Collins, Fred Wesley, Mike Mitchell, Vince Campbell) 5:08
9. "Funk Me Dirty" (Bootsy Collins, George Clinton, Trey Stone) 5:39
10. "Blasters" featuring Eddie Hazel (Bootsy Collins, Eddie Hazel) 6:59
11. "Good Nite Eddie" (Bootsy Collins, Eddie Hazel, Gary James) 4:23
12. "A Sacred Place" (Bootsy Collins, Greg Fitz) 3:36
13. "Half Past Midnight" (Bootsy Collins) 2:37
14. "It's a Silly Serious World" (Bootsy Collins) 5:17

Disc 2:

1. "J.R. (Just Right)" 5:05
2. "Funk Express Card" 4:50
3. "Back N The Day" 6:28
4. "Bad Girls" 4:59
5. "Good Nite Eddie" 4:24
6. "Where R The Children" 4:21
7. "Funk Me Dirty" 5:53
8. "It's a Silly Serious World" 5:09
9. "A Sacred Place" 4:21

== Personnel ==
- Musicians and vocalists
  - Catfish Collins, Razor "Sharp" Johnson, Bernie Worrell, Eddie Hazel, David Spradley, Maceo Parker, Frankie "Kash" Waddy, Fred Wesley, Rick Gardner, Kush Griffith, The "Horny Horns", Mike Mitchell, Vince Campbell, Don "Tiger" Martin, "Sweat Band", Gary "Mudd Bone" Cooper, Robert P-Nut Johnson, George Clinton, Anthony Cole, Buddy Miles, Wes Boatman, Ronni Harris, "Godmoma", Cynthia, Tony, Carol, Bobby Byrd, Casper, The Player, Fuzz Face, Trey Stone, Super-T, Ron Jenning, Pretty Fatt-Sheila & Cynthia, Kristin Gray, Greg Fitz, Dee "Dirty Mugg" James, David Cox, Anthony Goodin
