= Trojan Dub Massive: Chapter One =

Remix album by Bill Laswell
- Released: March 8, 2005
- Recorded: Orange Music, West Orange, New Jersey
- Genre: Dub
- Length: 64:02
- Label: Trojan

Bill Laswell chronology
Version 2 Version: A Dub Transmission (2004)	Trojan Dub Massive: Chapter One (2005)	Trojan Dub Massive: Chapter Two (2005)

Professional ratings
Review scores
Source	Rating
Allmusic	3/5 stars
PopMatters	(neutral)

Trojan Dub Massive: Chapter One is a remix album by American composer Bill Laswell, released on March 8, 2005 by Trojan Records.

== Track listing ==
No.	Title	Artist	Length
1.	"Cocaine"	Sly & The Revolutionaries	4:11
2.	"Herb"	Sly & The Revolutionaries	4:12
3.	"Don't Think About Me (I'm Alright)"	The Mafia All Stars and King Tubby	3:09
4.	"Blood Dunza Version"	King Tubby and The Aggrovators	3:23
5.	"Man a Warrior"	Tapper Zukie	4:10
6.	"Leggo Beast"	Gregory Isaacs' Allstars	3:34
7.	"Roots Man Dub"	Sly and Robbie	2:37
8.	"Acapulco Gold"	Sly & The Revolutionaries	3:53
9.	"Concentration Ver. 3"	The Crystalites	3:16
10.	"Lover's Shank (Spanglers Clap)"	The Upsetters	3:51
11.	"Jah Jah Children Dub"	Sly and Robbie	3:55
12.	"Negre Africa Dub"	Sly and Robbie	2:49
13.	"Out of Order"	Prince Jammy and The Aggrovators	5:48
14.	"Miss Know It All"	Scientist	3:23
15.	"Fist of Fury"	Prince Jammy	3:07
16.	"The Alien Aborts"	The Roots Radics	3:13
17.	"Stop the Dubbing"	The Aggrovators	2:30
18.	"Keep Cool Babylon"	Ras Michael & The Sons of Negus	3:01

== Personnel ==
Adapted from the Trojan Dub Massive: Chapter One liner notes.

- Bill Laswell – remixing
- Robert Musso – engineering
- James Dellatacoma – assistant engineer
- Michael Fossenkemper – mastering
- Alex Theoret – mastering
- John Brown – cover art

== Charts ==
Charts (2005)	Peak position
US Top Reggae Albums	15

== Release history ==
Region	Date	Label	Format	Catalog
United Kingdom	2005	Trojan	CD	TJCCD255
United States	2005	Sanctuary	CD	06076-80492-2
