= No Matter =

Studio album by Mark Nauseef/Kudsi Erguner/Markus Stockhausen/Bill Laswell
- Released: August 19, 2008
- Studio: Ztudio Zerkall, Germany; Orange Music, West Orange, NJ
- Genre: Drone, new-age
- Length: 55:16
- Label: Metastation
- Producer: Walter Quintus, Kurt Renker

Bill Laswell chronology
Lodge (2008)	No Matter (2008)	Invisible Design II (2009)

No Matter is a collaborative album by Kudsi Erguner, Bill Laswell, Mark Nauseef and Markus Stockhausen. It was released on August 19, 2008 by Metastation.

== Track listing ==
All music is composed by Kudsi Erguner, Bill Laswell, Mark Nauseef and Markus Stockhausen.

No.	Title	Length
1.	"Please Be Seated"	8:01
2.	"Expansion"	12:46
3.	"Suspension"	4:01
4.	"Hamsa"	3:51
5.	"Nirodha"	8:11
6.	"Ekatanata"	7:41
7.	"Return to Bell"	10:45

== Personnel ==
Adapted from the No Matter liner notes.

Musicians

- Kudsi Erguner – ney
- Bill Laswell – fretless bass guitar, sitar, effects, mixing
- Mark Nauseef – bells, gong
- Markus Stockhausen – flugelhorn, trumpet

Technical personnel

- John Brown – cover art, design
- James Dellatacoma – assistant engineer
- Michael Fossenkemper – mastering
- Robert Musso – engineering
- Walter Quintus – engineering, producer
- Kurt Renker – producer

== Release history ==
Region	Date	Label	Format	Catalog
Germany	2008	Metastation	CD	MT022
