= Live at the Bowery Poetry Project =

Live album by Musso, Laswell and Carter
- Released: September 1, 2007
- Recorded: November 7, 2004 at the Bowery Poetry Project, NYC
- Genre: Free improvisation
- Length: 40:15
- Label: Musso Music
- Producer: Robert Musso

Bill Laswell chronology
Outland 5 (2007)	Live at the Bowery Poetry Project (2007)	Lodge (2008)

Live at the Bowery Poetry Project is a collaborative album by Lance Carter, Bill Laswell and Robert Musso. It was released on September 1, 2007 by Musso Music.

== Track listing ==
All music is composed by Lance Carter, Bill Laswell and Robert Musso.

No.	Title	Length
1.	"Fred"	5:12
2.	"Derek"	2:52
3.	"Carlos"	4:00
4.	"Pete"	2:02
5.	"John"	4:20
6.	"Sonny"	2:30
7.	"Elliott"	1:34
8.	"Allan"	6:13
9.	"Raoul"	6:00
10.	"Robert"	5:39

== Personnel ==
Adapted from the Live at the Bowery Poetry Project liner notes.

- Lance Carter – drums
- Bill Laswell – bass guitar
- Robert Musso – guitar, producer

== Release history ==
Region	Date	Label	Format	Catalog
United States	2007	Musso Music	Digital Download	MM0031
