= Asian Games (album) =

Live album by Yōsuke Yamashita, Bill Laswell and Ryuichi Sakamoto
- Released: May 26, 1993
- Recorded: 1988
- Venues: Kampo and Platinum Island, NY and Runt, Tokyo
- Genres: Free jazz, avant-garde jazz, experimental pop
- Length: 34:57
- Label: Verve Forecast
- Producers: Bill Laswell, Ryuichi Sakamoto

Bill Laswell chronology
Deconstruction: The Celluloid Recordings (1993)	Asian Games (1993)	Ambient Dub Volume I (1993)

Professional ratings
Review scores
Source	Rating
AllMusic	2/5 stars

Asian Games is a collaborative album by Yōsuke Yamashita, Bill Laswell and Ryuichi Sakamoto. It was released on May 26, 1993, by Verve Forecast Records.

== Track listing ==
No.	Title	Writer(s)	Length
1.	"Melting Pot"	Bill Laswell, Nicky Skopelitis, Yōsuke Yamashita	7:13
2.	"Chasin' the Air"	Ryuichi Sakamoto, Yōsuke Yamashita	4:42
3.	"Asian Games"	Bill Laswell, Nicky Skopelitis, Yōsuke Yamashita	6:50
4.	"Ninja Drive"	Bill Laswell, Nicky Skopelitis, Yōsuke Yamashita	7:46
5.	"Napping on the Bamboo"	Ryuichi Sakamoto, Yōsuke Yamashita	5:45
6.	"A Parade of Rain, The Moon and a Bride"	Yōsuke Yamashita	2:41

== Personnel ==
Adapted from the Asian Games liner notes.

Musicians

- Aïyb Dieng – congas, cymbals, tambourine, percussion
- Bill Laswell – bass guitar, sitar, effects, producer (1, 3, 4, 6)
- Ryuichi Sakamoto – keyboards, producer and recording (2, 5)
- Nicky Skopelitis - Fairlight synthesizer, effects
- Yōsuke Yamashita – piano, keyboards

Technical

- Oz Fritz – recording (1, 3, 4, 6)
- Katsuhiko Hibino – illustrations
- Dimitri Jakimowicz – recording (1, 3, 4, 6)
- Robert Musso – mixing, recording (1, 3, 4, 6)
- Hiroaki Sugawara – recording (2, 5)
- Howie Weinberg – mastering

== Release history ==
Region	Date	Label	Format	Catalog
United Kingdom	1993	Verve Forecast	CD	518 344-2
Japan	1993	Mercury	CD	PHCE-42
United States	1994	Verve Forecast	CD	314 518 344-2
