= Version 2 Version: A Dub Transmission =

Studio album by Bill Laswell
- Released: September 21, 2004
- Recorded: Orange Music, West Orange, NJ
- Genre: Ambient dub
- Length: 51:15
- Label: ROIR
- Producer: Bill Laswell

Bill Laswell chronology
Soup Live (2004)	Version 2 Version: A Dub Transmission (2004)	Trojan Dub Massive: Chapter One (2005)

Professional ratings
Review scores
Source	Rating
Allmusic	3.5/5 stars
Mojo	3/5 stars
PopMatters	(positive)

Version 2 Version: A Dub Transmission is the fifteenth solo album by American composer Bill Laswell, released on September 21, 2004, by ROIR.

== Track listing ==
No.	Title	Writer(s)	Length
1.	"Dystopia"	Bill Laswell, Jah Wobble	9:43
2.	"Simulacra"	Bill Laswell	8:57
3.	"Space-Time Paradox"	Bill Laswell, Jah Wobble	6:18
4.	"Babylon Site"	Bill Laswell, Jah Wobble	8:43
5.	"Night City"	Bill Laswell	8:55
6.	"System Malfunction"	Bill Laswell, Jah Wobble	8:39

== Personnel ==
Adapted from the Version 2 Version: A Dub Transmission liner notes.

Musicians

- Bernie Worrell – keyboards
- Jah Wobble – bass guitar
- Bill Laswell – bass guitar, guitar, producer
- Karsh Kale – drums, tabla
- Abdou M'Boup – percussion
- Chris Cookson – drum programming

Technical personnel

- Robert Musso – engineering
- James Dellatacoma – assistant engineer
- Michael Fossenkemper – mastering
- Alex Theoret – mastering
- John Brown – cover art, design

== Release history ==
Region	Date	Label	Format	Catalog
United States	2004	ROIR	CD, LP	RUS 8288
