= Serene Timeless Joy =

Studio album by Rasa
- Released: July 13, 1999
- Studios: Orange Music (West Orange, N.J.)
- Genre: Ambient
- Length: 60:28
- Label: Meta
- Producer: Bill Laswell

Bill Laswell chronology
Charged (1999)	Serene Timeless Joy (1999)	Imaginary Cuba (1999)

Professional ratings
Review scores
Source	Rating
AllMusic	2.5/5 stars

Serene Timeless Joy is an album by American composer Bill Laswell, issued under the moniker Rasa. It was released on July 13, 1999, by Meta Records.

== Track listing ==
No.	Title	Writer(s)	Length
1.	"Shining Stone (Watu Jilang)"	Bill Laswell	60:28

== Personnel ==
Adapted from the Serene Timeless Joy liner notes.

Musicians

- Bill Laswell – bass guitar, effects, musical arrangements, producer

Technical personnel

- Yalitza Ferreras – design
- Michael Fossenkemper – mastering
- Robert Musso – engineering

== Release history ==
Region	Date	Label	Format	Catalog
United States	1999	Meta	CD	MT-004
