= Invisible Design II =

Studio album by Bill Laswell
- Released: March 24, 2009
- Recorded: Orange Music, West Orange, NJ
- Genre: Ambient
- Length: 49:38
- Label: Tzadik
- Producer: John Zorn

Bill Laswell chronology
No Matter (2008)	Invisible Design II (2009)	Bass & Drums (2011)

Professional ratings
Review scores
Source	Rating
Allmusic	3/5 stars

Invisible Design II is the sixteenth solo album by American composer Bill Laswell, released on March 24, 2009, by Tzadik Records.

== Track listing ==
All music is composed by Bill Laswell.

No.	Title	Length
1.	"Xtrak"	2:59
2.	"Quartz"	5:12
3.	"Aphasia"	7:15
4.	"Sub Sonnet"	7:11
5.	"Solar Clip"	3:26
6.	"Iron Monger"	1:58
7.	"Fractal"	5:08
8.	"Pillar"	3:08
9.	"Gulf of Stars"	7:08
10.	"Darkness After"	6:13

== Personnel ==
Adapted from the Invisible Design II liner notes.

Musicians

- Bill Laswell – fretless bass guitar, eight-string bass guitar, effects

Technical personnel

- Heung-Heung Chin – design
- James Dellatacoma – assistant engineer
- Scott Hull – mastering
- Robert Musso – recording
- John Zorn – producer

== Release history ==
Region	Date	Label	Format	Catalog
United States	2009	Tzadik	CD	TZ 8062
