= Lodge (Fanu and Bill Laswell album) =

Studio album by Fanu + Bill Laswell
- Released: March 28, 2008
- Recorded: Orange Music, West Orange, NJ
- Genre: Drum and bass
- Length: 45:05
- Label: Karlrecords
- Producer: Bill Laswell

Bill Laswell chronology
Live at the Bowery Poetry Project (2007)	Lodge (2008)	No Matter (2008)

Lodge is a collaborative album by Fanu and Bill Laswell, released on March 28, 2008 by Karlrecords.

== Track listing ==
All music is composed by Janne Hatula and Bill Laswell.

No.	Title	Length
1.	"Orh"	5:47
2.	"Bloodline"	5:36
3.	"Transgenesis"	4:46
4.	"Hollow Grounds"	4:53
5.	"Fourth Voice"	5:35
6.	"Transfer Code"	6:32
7.	"The Incal"	7:32
8.	"Shroud"	4:24

== Personnel ==
Adapted from the Lodge liner notes.

Musicians

- Fanu – drum programming
- Graham Haynes – cornet
- Bill Laswell – bass guitar, effects, producer
- Nils Petter Molvær – trumpet
- Bernie Worrell – keyboards

Technical personnel

- John Brown – cover art, design
- James Dellatacoma – assistant engineer
- Michael Fossenkemper – mastering
- Robert Musso – engineering

== Release history ==
Region	Date	Label	Format	Catalog
Germany	2008	Karlrecords	CD	KR 004
United States	2008	Ohm Resistance	CD	8M OHM
Japan	2008	Columbia Music	CD	COCB-53686
