= Charged (Toshinori Kondo, Eraldo Bernocchi and Bill Laswell album) =

Studio album by Toshinori Kondo, Eraldo Bernocchi and Bill Laswell
- Released: June 28, 1999
- Studio: Coffee Shop (Amsterdam), Metal Box (Kawasaki), Orange Music (West Orange, N.J.), Verba Corrige (Milan)
- Genre: Jazz-funk
- Length: 52:32
- Label: Apollo
- Producer: Eraldo Bernocchi, Toshinori Kondo

Bill Laswell chronology
The End of Law (1999)	Charged (1999)	Serene Timeless Joy (1999)

Charged is a collaborative album by Eraldo Bernocchi, Toshinori Kondo and Bill Laswell, released on June 28, 1999, by Apollo Records.

== Track listing ==
No.	Title	Writer(s)	Length
1.	"Called"	Eraldo Bernocchi, Toshinori Kondo, Bill Laswell	5:27
2.	"Cried"	Eraldo Bernocchi, Toshinori Kondo, Bill Laswell	5:50
3.	"Cornered"	Eraldo Bernocchi, Toshinori Kondo, Bill Laswell	5:14
4.	"Connected"	Eraldo Bernocchi, Toshinori Kondo, Bill Laswell	7:48
5.	"Cleared"	Eraldo Bernocchi, Toshinori Kondo	4:49
6.	"Tokyo"	Eraldo Bernocchi, Toshinori Kondo	8:57
7.	"Crooned"	Eraldo Bernocchi, Toshinori Kondo	5:23
8.	"Changed"	Eraldo Bernocchi, Toshinori Kondo, Bill Laswell	5:35
9.	"Out"	Eraldo Bernocchi, Toshinori Kondo	3:28

== Personnel ==
Adapted from the Charged liner notes.

Musicians

- Eraldo Bernocchi – guitar, drum programming, electronics, producer, recording, mixing
- Toshinori Kondo – trumpet, recording, mixing, producer
- Bill Laswell – bass guitar (1–4, 8)

Technical personnel

- Michael Fossenkemper – mastering
- Robert Musso – recording
- Petulia Mattioli;– artwork and graphic design
- Masanari Tamai – photography

== Release history ==
Region	Date	Label	Format	Catalog
United States	1999	Apollo	CD, LP	AMB 9955
Japan	2001	Spiritual Nature	CD	SN-002
