= Konton =

Studio album by Kai
- Released: March 2, 2011
- Recorded: Wang Guang RecLabs, Tokyo, Japan
- Genre: Noise rock, jazz fusion
- Length: 60:29
- Label: P-Vine
- Producer: Bill Laswell

Bill Laswell chronology
| Bass & Drums (2011) | Konton (2011) | Aspiration (2011) |

Kai/Konton is a collaborative album by Bill Laswell, Yoshi Otani, Manabu Murata and Munenori Senju. It released on March 2, 2011 by P-Vine Records.

== Track listing ==
All music is composed by Bill Laswell, Yoshi Otani, Manabu Murata and Munenori Senju.

| No. | Title | Length |
|---|---|---|
| 1. | "Kai 1" | 15:21 |
| 2. | "Kai 2" | 12:25 |
| 3. | "Kai 3" | 5:01 |
| 4. | "Kai 4" | 14:43 |
| 5. | "Kai 5" | 12:58 |

== Personnel ==
Adapted from the Konton liner notes.

Musicians

- Bill Laswell – bass guitar, producer
- Yoshi Otani – saxophone, effects
- Manabu Murata – guitar
- Munenori Senju – drums

Technical personnel

- John Brown – design
- James Dellatacoma – assistant engineer
- Michael Fossenkemper – mastering
- Robert Musso – engineering
- Hisaaki Oshima – recording

== Release history ==
| Region | Date | Label | Format | Catalog |
|---|---|---|---|---|
| Japan | 2011 | P-Vine | CD | PCD-25126 |
