= Trojan Dub Massive: Chapter Two =

Remix album by Bill Laswell
- Released: March 8, 2005
- Recorded: Orange Music, West Orange, NJ
- Genre: Dub
- Length: 60:34
- Label: Trojan

Bill Laswell chronology
Trojan Dub Massive: Chapter One (2005)	Trojan Dub Massive: Chapter Two (2005)	Episome (2006)

Professional ratings
Review scores
Source	Rating
Allmusic	3.5/5 stars
PopMatters	(neutral)

Trojan Dub Massive: Chapter Two is a remix album by American composer Bill Laswell, released on March 8, 2005 by Trojan Records.

== Track listing ==
No.	Title	Artist	Length
1.	"Drum Rock"	The Upsetters	3:59
2.	"Scientest (Stalog 17)"	Scientist	3:28
3.	"Java"	Augustus Pablo	2:55
4.	"Bedroom Mazurka Version"	Augustus Pablo	2:28
5.	"Youth Man"	Niney the Observer and King Tubby	4:05
6.	"Buckshot Dub"	Rupie Edwards	3:45
7.	"A Noisy Place"	Horace Andy and The Aggrovators	2:26
8.	"Throne of Blood"	Prince Jammy	3:08
9.	"Stepping Out"	Sly and Robbie	2:47
10.	"Washroom Skank"	The Upsetters	4:05
11.	"Dubbing With The Observer"	Niney the Observer and King Tubby	4:24
12.	"Freedom Dub"	The Revolutionaries	2:14
13.	"King Tubby's Gold Dub"	Jah Thomas and The Roots Radics	3:28
14.	"The Death of Mr. Spock"	The Roots Radics	3:59
15.	"King Tubby's Badness Dub"	King Tubby	4:18
16.	"Shaolin Temple"	Prince Jammy	2:52
17.	"Flash Gordon Meets Luke Skywalker"	The Roots Radics	3:36
18.	"Rastaman Chant"	Ras Michael & The Sons of Negus	2:37

== Personnel ==
Adapted from the Trojan Dub Massive: Chapter Two liner notes.

- John Brown – cover art
- James Dellatacoma – assistant engineer
- Michael Fossenkemper – mastering
- Bill Laswell – remixing
- Robert Musso – engineering
- Alex Theoret – mastering

== Release history ==
Region	Date	Label	Format	Catalog
United Kingdom	2005	Trojan	CD	TJCCD256
United States	2005	Sanctuary	CD	06076-80493-2
