= Hear No Evil (album) =

Studio album by Bill Laswell
- Released: March 21, 1988
- Studio: B.C. Studios, Brooklyn, NY
- Genre: Ambient
- Length: 43:14
- Label: Venture/Virgin
- Producer: Bill Laswell

Bill Laswell chronology
Low Life (1987)	Hear No Evil (1988)	Deconstruction: The Celluloid Recordings (1993)

Professional ratings
Review scores
Source	Rating
Allmusic	4/5 stars
Robert Christgau	B+
Spin Alternative Record Guide	8/10

Hear No Evil is the second album by American composer Bill Laswell. It was released on March 21, 1988, by Venture and Virgin Records.

== Track listing ==
All music is composed by Bill Laswell.

No.	Title	Length
1.	"Lost Roads"	7:26
2.	"Bullet Hole Memory"	7:14
3.	"Illinois Central"	7:01
4.	"Assassin"	6:25
5.	"Stations of the Cross"	7:32
6.	"Kingdom Come"	7:36

Meta Records bonus disc track listing
No.	Title	Length
1.	"Lost Roads" (Orchestral Site)	18:07
2.	"Kingdom Come" (Ambient Site)	26:28

== Personnel ==
Adapted from the Hear No Evil liner notes.

Musicians

- Aïyb Dieng – percussion
- Zakir Hussain – percussion
- Bill Laswell – bass guitar, producer
- Daniel Ponce – percussion
- L. Shankar – violin
- Nicky Skopelitis – guitar

Technical

- Martin Bisi – recording, mixing
- Thi-Linh Le – photography
- Robert Musso – engineering
- Howie Weinberg – mastering

== Release history ==
Region	Date	Label	Format	Catalog
United States	1988	Venture, Virgin	CD, CS, LP	7-90888-1
United Kingdom	1988	Venture	CD, CS, LP	VE 12
United States	1999	Meta	CD	MT005
