= Telecommunication Breakdown =

Studio album by Emergency Broadcast Network
- Released: 1995
- Recorded: 1995
- Genre: Electronic
- Length: 53:13
- Label: TVT
- Producer: Jack Dangers

Professional ratings
Review scores
Source	Rating
AllMusic	4.5/5 stars

Telecommunication Breakdown is an album by Emergency Broadcast Network. It was released in 1995 by TVT Records. The CD includes three video tracks in addition to the audio, and a floppy disc includes an interactive press kit.

The music was produced by Jack Dangers, as a side project from his group Meat Beat Manifesto. The album features a number of guest performers: Brian Eno on "Homicidal Schizophrenic," with Jamie West-Oram of The Fixx on guitar; Bill Laswell contributed to "Shoot the Mac-10," with Grandmaster Melle Mel rapping.

== Critical reception ==
The New York Times wrote: "Outrageous and aggressive, Breakdown is guaranteed to have you either laughing, dancing or running from the room in terror ... Emergency Broadcast Network has a CD-ROM vision that matches and, to an extent, deepens its sonic attack."

== Track listing ==
1. "search" – 0:59
2. "Electronic Behavior Control System" – 4:33
3. "go to" – 0:12
4. "Sexual Orientation" – 3:06
5. "Station Identification" – 4:40
6. "Get Down Ver. 2.2" – 3:45
7. "Shoot the Mac-10" – 4:03
8. "You Have 5 Seconds to Complete This Section" – 3:06
9. "Super Zen State (Power Chant No.3)" – 6:50
10. "State Extension" – 1:15
11. "interruption" – 0:23
12. "Dream Induction" – 3:20
13. "transition" – 0:06
14. "Electronic Behavior Control System Ver. 2.0" – 2:24
15. "We Must Have the Facts" – 3:05
16. "interference" – 0:14
17. "3:7:8" – 3:43
18. "Beginning of the End" – 2:45
19. "Homicidal Schizophrenic (A Lad Insane)" – 4:08
20. "end of audio program" – 0:45

== Video track listing ==
1. "Electronic Behavior Control System" - 5:33
2. "3:7:8" – 3:42
3. "Homicidal Schizophrenic (A Lad Insane)" – 4:17
