= Hardware (band) =

American funk rock supergroup

- Hardware from their album Third Eye Open

Background information
- Genres: Funk rock
- Past members: Buddy Miles; Bootsy Collins; Stevie Salas

Hardware were an American funk rock supergroup consisting of Buddy Miles, Bootsy Collins and Stevie Salas.

It featured Mudbone Cooper, Bernard Fowler and George Clinton on backing vocals, and was produced by Bill Laswell. The group was originally called The Third Eye, but changed their name due to conflicts with another group. They released one album, entitled Third Eye Open in 1992.
