= Jungle Bass =

EP by Bootsy's Rubber Band
- Released: 1990
- Recorded: 1990
- Genre: Funk, electro-funk
- Length: 29:48
- Label: 4th & B'way
- Producer: Bootsy Collins; Bill Laswell

Bootsy's Rubber Band chronology
What's Bootsy Doin'? (1988)	Jungle Bass (1990)	Blasters of the Universe (1993)

Professional ratings
Review scores
Source	Rating
AllMusic	3/5 stars

Jungle Bass is an EP by American funk band Bootsy's Rubber Band. The disc was released in 1990 by 4th & B'way Records. Jungle Bass reunites most of the original members of Bootsy's Rubber Band, whose last album was released in 1979. The album represents one of the earliest collaborations between Bootsy and producer Bill Laswell.

== Track listing ==
1. "Jungle Bass" (Jungle One/Long Form)
  (W Collins, Bill Laswell, Bernie Worrell, Joel Johnson) 13:10
2. "Disciples of Funk (The Return of the Funkateers)"
  (W Collins, Fred Wesley, Maceo Parker, Richard Griffith, Rick Gardner) 4:41
3. "Jungle Bass" (House of Bass Mix)
  (W Collins, B Laswell, B Worrell, J Johnson) 9:03
4. "Interzone" (Silent Hush-Hush Mix/Cyberfunk)
  (W Collins, B Laswell, B Worrell, J Johnson) 3:17

== Personnel ==
- Trombone: Fred Wesley
- Alto Saxophone: Maceo Parker
- Trumpet: Richard Griffith, Rick Gardner
- Synthesizer: Bernie Worrell, Joel "Razor Sharp" Johnson, Jeff Bova
- Front Ground Vocals: Gary Cooper
- Bass, Samples & Free Jazz: Bill Laswell
- Space Bass, Guitar, Drums, Black Noise, Unsamples & Vocals: Bootsy Collins
- Robot Vocals: Boot-Tron
