= The Day of the Robot =

Studio album by Buckethead
- Released: April 30, 1996
- Genre: Drum and bass, dark ambient, heavy metal, avant-garde, oldschool jungle
- Length: 43:09
- Label: Subharmonic
- Producer: Bill Laswell

Buckethead chronology
Giant Robot (1994)	The Day of the Robot (1996)	Colma (1998)

The Day of the Robot is the third studio album by Buckethead.

== Reception ==
Professional ratings
Review scores
Source	Rating
Allmusic	4/5 stars

Alternative Press (11/96, p. 69) gave the album 5 stars out of 5 and said, "...has both a decidedly experimental side, as well as a knack for placing sounds in sturdy, though scary, compositional contexts....Buckethead seems to have found a new place for guitar gods..."

== Track listing ==
No.	Title	Length
1.	"Destroyer: Speed Flux Quadrant/Inclusion/Exhaust Release"	13:03
2.	"Flying Guillotine"	7:24
3.	"Quantum Crash"	6:02
4.	"Collision"	8:23
5.	"Caution Drop"	8:17
Total length:		43:09

== Credits ==
Performers

- Buckethead: electric guitar
- Ninj: bass guitar, keyboards, drums
- Bill Laswell: low bass, drums, percussion

Production

- Recorded at Coast Recorders, San Francisco, and Greenpoint Studio, Brooklyn
- Rhythm tracks for 2, 3, 4 and 5 created in the UK by Ninj.
- Produced by Bill Laswell.
- Design, illustration and photography: Dave McKean @ Hourglass.
- Source photographs supplied by Buckethead.
- Front cover illustration of 'Buckethead No. 1': Bryan Frankenseuss Theiss.
- Fonts: Elliot Earls.
