= Imaginary Cuba =

Studio album by Bill Laswell
- Released: September 14, 1999
- Studio: Orange Music, West Orange, NJ
- Genre: Dub, sound collage
- Length: 57:26
- Label: Wicklow
- Producer: Bill Laswell

Bill Laswell chronology
Serene Timeless Joy (1999)	Imaginary Cuba (1999)	Broken Vessels (1999)

Professional ratings
Review scores
Source	Rating
AllMusic	4/5 stars
Alternative Press	4/5 stars
DownBeat	4/5 stars
Entertainment Weekly	B+

Imaginary Cuba is the ninth solo album by the American composer Bill Laswell, released on September 14, 1999, by Wicklow.

== Critical reception ==
Noting the influence taken from Latin American music, AllMusic reviewer Rick Anderson wrote: "Imaginary Cuba finds [Laswell] taking an approach somewhat similar to the one he employed on his Off World One project -- building on a foundation of field recordings, he constructs complex and often dub-inflected sound collages that sound like no one but Laswell while still maintaining respect for the music's origins."

== Track listing ==
No.	Title	Writer(s)	Length
1.	"Habana Transmission #1/Avisale a la Vecina Dub"	Bill Laswell	4:57
2.	"Para Clave y Guaguanco"	Amado de Jesús Dedeu Hernández	3:04
3.	"Loungin With F.E."	Frank Emilio Flynn	1:09
4.	"Chacón and Daniel"	Bill Laswell	4:26
5.	"Déjala en la Puntica"	Amado de Jesús Dedeu Hernández	2:21
6.	"Habana Transmission #2/Cuban Evolution"	Bill Laswell	4:39
7.	"Los Ibellis"	Los Ibellis, Bill Laswell	6:37
8.	"Habana Transmission #3/Shango Sound Scan"	Los Ibellis	4:44
9.	"Hombre Lobo, No! Hombre Nuevo, Si"	Bill Laswell	3:48
10.	"Guerillero Heroico"	Bill Laswell	3:33
11.	"Shango"	Los Ibellis	1:15
12.	"Pompa at the House"	Guillermo Pompa	1:53
13.	"Madre No Me Pida in Dub"	Raúl Planas	3:37
14.	"Chaos in the Heat"	Bill Laswell	4:49
15.	"Drafting Shadows/Leaving la Habana"	Bill Laswell	6:34

== Personnel ==
Adapted from the Imaginary Cuba liner notes.

- Bill Laswell – bass guitar, drum programming, musical arrangements, producer, recording
- Oz Fritz – engineering
- Daniel Laine – photography

== Release history ==
Region	Date	Label	Format	Catalog
United States	1999	Wicklow	CD	09026-63514-2
