= Colma (album) =

Studio album by Buckethead
- Released: March 24, 1998
- Genre: Ambient, trip hop, alternative rock
- Length: 54:27
- Label: CyberOctave, Higher Octave Music, Virgin, EMI
- Producer: Buckethead, Extrakd and Bill Laswell

Buckethead chronology
The Day of the Robot (1996)	Colma (1998)	Monsters and Robots (1999)

Colma is the fourth studio album by guitarist Buckethead. It was released on March 24, 1998, on CyberOctave records. The album was recorded for Buckethead's mother, who at the time was sick with colon cancer, and he wanted to make an album which she would enjoy listening to while recovering.

Berklee College of Music alumna Teri Untalan appeared as a guest musician on two tracks of the album. In a 2009 interview, she recalled Buckethead as being "an odd one, an elusive character."

== Background ==
Colma is somewhat of a departure for the artist, featuring more acoustic guitar than is typical of his albums. Additionally, Colma mostly contains simple bass guitar, lead guitar, and drum patterns, in contrast to much of Buckethead's music that emphasizes speed and virtuosity.

== Reception ==
Professional ratings
Review scores
Source	Rating
AllMusic	3/5 stars

Critical reception was mixed to positive. James Lien of CMJ New Music Monthly writes that Colma's melodies are "geometric and mathematical-sounding, almost like Bach or modern classical music." Andy Gill of The Independent describes the mood of the album as "reflective" saying, "[Buckethead uses] the dry, neutral tone favoured by jazz guitarists on a series of discreet instrumentals."

Gill describes the tracks "Ghost" and "Hills of Eternity" as being "ruminative, sluggish pieces sprinkled with limpid droplets of guitar." He also thought the title-track, "Colma", closed the album "like the twinkle of a long-dead star." Reviewer Jeff Clutterbuck of The Daily Vault considers "Watching the Boats With My Dad" to be an authentic, emotional track writing that "[It] is so wistful and flows so gently, you have to believe it was inspired by a real moment." On the other hand, "Big Sur Moon" offers a change of style in guitar playing showcasing Buckethead's consistent quick rhythmic ability on acoustic guitar.

Rick Anderson of AllMusic gave the album three stars out of a possible five, writing "the material is surprisingly pleasant" for Buckethead, with a "contemplative" quality to most songs. Anderson criticized the "unimaginative production" and thought Buckethead's lackluster bass playing was disappointing compared to his guitar work.

== Track listing ==
All tracks are written by Buckethead.

No.	Title	Length
1.	"Whitewash"	4:44
2.	"For Mom"	5:10
3.	"Ghost"	5:29
4.	"Hills of Eternity"	5:07
5.	"Big Sur Moon"	1:13
6.	"Machete"	6:18
7.	"Wishing Well"	4:03
8.	"Lone Sal Bug"	5:32
9.	"Sanctum"	3:42
10.	"Wondering"	2:16
11.	"Watching the Boats with My Dad"	5:07
12.	"Ghost/Part 2"	2:31
13.	"Colma"	3:15
Total length:		54:27

=== Notes ===
- The song "Hills of Eternity" is named after the cemetery, Hills of Eternity Memorial Park where Wyatt Earp is buried.
- The song "Wishing Well" is identical to the Pieces song "Danyel", but excludes Buckethead's vocals.

== Personnel ==
Performers

- Buckethead – acoustic guitar, electric guitar, bass guitar (on all tracks, except "Machete")
- Brain – drums, percussion, tape loops
- DJ Disk – turntables (on "Machete," "Hills of Eternity," and "Lone Sal Bug")
- Bill Laswell – bass guitar (on "Machete")
- Terry Untalan – cello, viola (on "Wondering" and "Lone Sal Bug")

Production

- Recorded and mixed by Xtrack at Embalming Plant, Oakland, CA.
- Track 6 recorded and mixed by Robert Musso at Orange Music, West Orange, New Jersey.
- Produced by Buckethead and Xtrack. Track 6 produced by Bill Laswell and Buckethead.
