= Next to Nothing (Nicky Skopelitis album) =

Studio album by Nicky Skopelitis
- Released: 1989
- Recorded: BC Studio in Brooklyn, New York
- Genre: Jazz fusion
- Length: 34:35
- Label: Venture
- Producer: Bill Laswell, Nicky Skopelitis

Nicky Skopelitis chronology
Next to Nothing (1989)	Faith Moves (1991)

Professional ratings
Review scores
Source	Rating
Allmusic	3/5 stars
Rolling Stone	3.5/5 stars

Next to Nothing is the debut studio album of Nicky Skopelitis, released on 1989 through Venture.

== Track listing ==
No.	Title	Length
1.	"Bad Blood"	3:34
2.	"Black Eyes"	4:31
3.	"Shotgun News"	5:13
4.	"Altai"	3:28
5.	"Ta Magika"	4:32
6.	"Second Skin"	5:51
7.	"Omens"	7:22

== Personnel ==
Musicians

- Ginger Baker – drums
- Aïyb Dieng – percussion
- Fred Frith – violin
- Bill Laswell – bass guitar, production
- Simon Shaheen – Oud, violin
- Nicky Skopelitis – guitar, production

Production and additional personnel

- Martin Bisi – mixing, recording
- Oz Fritz – assistant engineering
- Thi-Linh Le – cover art, photography
- Robert Musso – recording
- Howie Weinberg – mastering
