= Cheb i Sabbah =

- Born: Serge El Beze; 7 August 1947; Constantine, Algeria
- Died: 6 November 2013 (aged 66) San Francisco, California, United States
- Genres: Global Electronica
- Occupations: DJ, composer, producer
- Years active: 1989–2013
- Label: Six Degrees

Serge El Beze, best known as Cheb i Sabbah (7 August 1947 – 6 November 2013) was a DJ and composer/producer known for combining Asian, Arabian, and African sounds into his compositions. El Beze was of Jewish and Berber descent. He was born in Algeria and came from a family of musicians. When he was a teenager, El Beze moved to Paris and, in 1964, began his career DJing American soul music records. In 1984, he settled as a DJ in San Francisco. In 1989 he began using the stage name "Cheb i Sabbah", which translates to "young of the morning". He has seven recordings on the Six Degrees Records label.

El Beze's performances included live musicians, dancers and massive projected visuals, backing up his electronic music. He was nominated for the BBC's 2006 Award for World Music in the Club Global category.

His song "Toura Toura: Nav Deep Remix" was featured in soundtrack of FIFA 08 as well as Cricket 07.

El Beze was diagnosed with stage 4 stomach cancer in May 2011. He died on November 6, 2013, in San Francisco.

== Discography ==
- Shri Durga (1999)
- Maha Maya-Shri Durga Remixed (2000)
- Krishna Lila (2002)
- Krishna Lila Select (Bhajans) (2002)
- La Kahena (2005)
- La Kahena Remixed-EP (2005)
- La Ghriba-La Kahena Remixed (2006)
- Devotion (2008)
- Samaya: A Benefit Album For Cheb i Sabbah (2012)
