= Kudsi Erguner =

Turkish ney flute player and composer (born 1952)

Kudsi Ergüner
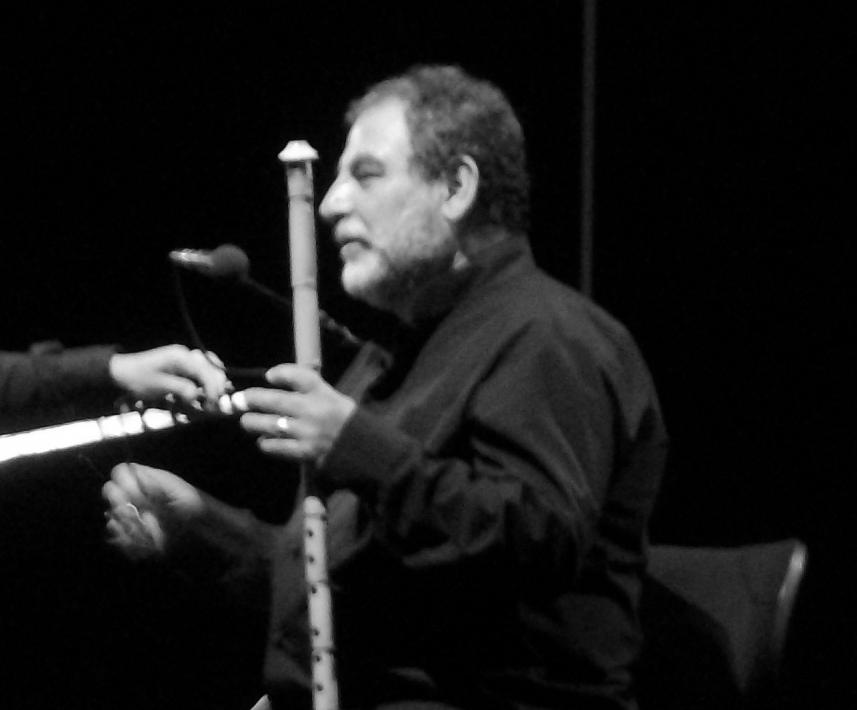
- Erguner in 2012.

Background information
- Born: 4 February 1952 (age 74); Diyarbakır, Turkey
- Genres: Mevlevi Sufi music
- Occupations: Musician, composer
- Instrument: Ney
- Labels: ACT

Kudsi Erguner (born 4 February 1952 in Diyarbakır, Turkey) is a Turkish musician. He is considered a master of traditional Mevlevi Sufi music and is one of the best-known players of the Turkish ney flute.

== Biography ==
As a boy, Erguner studied with his father Ulvi Erguner and attended the Sema of the Mevlevi-Sufi tradition along with other Dervish ceremonies. He started his musical career in Istanbul Radio in 1969. For several decades, he has researched the earliest roots of Ottoman music which he has also taught, performed and recorded.

In the seventies Erguner moved to Paris where, at the beginning of the eighties, he founded the Mevlana Institute devoted to the study and teaching of classical Sufi music. Together with the Kudsi Erguner Ensemble he developed deep insights into the diversity of his culture: the group conveys both authentic, often improvised forms of expression of classical Ottoman performance culture as well as a comprehensive repertoire of modern and classical pieces that can be traced back to the 13th century.

He took part in Peter Brook's movie Meetings with Remarkable Men in 1978.

In addition to his own recordings, Erguner has performed with Peter Gabriel (The Last Temptation of Christ soundtrack), William Orbit's band Bassomatic (Set the Controls for the Heart of the Bass), Jean Michel Jarre (whom he later sued, leading to the removal of his contributions to the album Revolutions), Maurice Béjart, Peter Brook, George Aperghis, Didier Lockwood, Italian singer-songwriter Alice and Michel Portal.

In July 2016, he was named UNESCO Artist for peace.

== Discography ==
- Meditation on the Ney (Unesco Collection), 1978
- Whirling Dervishes from Turkey, with Kemal Evren, Tugrul Inancer, Aram Kerovpyan, Muzzffereddîn Ozak, Hafiz Kemâl Ozmutlu, Mahmud Tabrîzîzade, 1981
- Turkey: Art of the Ottoman Tanbur, 1989
- The Mystic Flutes of Sufi: Preludes to Ceremonies of the Whirling Dervishes, with Suleyman Erguner, 1988
- Cérémonie des Derviches Kadiri, 1989
- Fasl Hidjaz Houmayoun, 1990
- Sufi Music of Turkey, with Suleyman Erguner, Mahmoud Tabrizi Zadeh, Bruno Caillat, 1990
- The Turkish Ney, with Salih Dede, Suleyman Erguner, 1990
- Gazel: Classical Sufi Music of the Ottoman Empire, with Husnu Anil, Aziz Bahriyeli, Yusuf Bilgin, Mehmet Emin Bitmez, Suleyman Erguner, Hasan Esen, Fevzi Misir, Walter Quintus, Kurt Renker, 1991
- Ottoman Classical Music, with Gilles Andrieux, 1992
- Peshrev & Semai of Tanburi Djemil Bey, with Walter Quintus, 1994
- L'Orient de L'Occident: Flamenco & Ottoman Sufi Music, with Yusuf Bilgin. Mehmet Emin Bitmez, Bruno Caillat, Pedro Soler, 1995
- The Sacred Flute of the Whirling Dervishes, 1996
- Works of Kemani Tatyos Efendi, with Husnu Anil, Mehmet Emin Bitmez, Suleyman Erguner, Necip Gulses, Dogan Hosses, Sükrü Kabaci, Baki Kemanci, 1996
- Vocal Masterpieces of Kemani Tatyos Efendi, with Husnu Anil, Suleyman Erguner, Necip Gulses, Dogan Hosses, Sükrü Kabaci, Baki Kemanci, 1996
- Psalms of Yunus Emre, with Yusuf Bilgin, Bruno Caillat, 1997
- Chemins, with Pierre Rigopoulos, Martin Saint-Pierre, Derya Turkan, 1997
- Music from the Arabian Nights, with Bruno Caillat, Tabrizi Mahmoud Zadeh, 1999
- Ottomania, with Walter Quintus, 1999
- Islam Blues, with Bruno Caillat, Renaud Garcia-Fons, Nguyên Lê, Derya Turkan, Mark Nauseef, Yunus Balcioglu, Halil Neciboglu, Walter Quintus, 2001
- Taj Mahal, with Bruno Caillat, Sultan Khan, Fazal Qureshi, Derya Turkan, Ken Zukerman, 2001
- Nazım Hikmet – Şair Cenazesi, 2002
- Gazing Point, with Markus Stockhausen, Mark Nauseef, Walter Quintus, 2003
- No Matter, with Markus Stockhausen, Mark Nauseef, Bill Laswell, Walter Quintus, 2008
- Fragments Des Cérémonies Soufies, L'invitation à L'Extase, Kudsi Erguner & Lâmekân Ensemble, Seyir Muzik 2021

With Anouar Brahem

- Conte de l'Incroyable Amour (ECM, 1991)

== Other sources ==
- letişim Publications – Biogry of Kudsi Erguner (in Turkish)
