= Fanu =

Finnish DJ

- Birth name: Janne Hatula
- Born: March 21, 1980 (age 45); Helsinki, Finland
- Genres: Drum and bass
- Occupation: Musician
- Instrument: Keyboards
- Years active: 1992–present
- Labels: Lightless Recordings

Fanu is the alias of music DJ, producer, and label founder Janne Hatula (born March 21, 1980). Based in Helsinki, Finland, Hatula composes drum and bass and electronic music. He began producing music at the age of twelve as a hobby before issuing his first recording in 2003. He also makes hip hop as FatGyver. He has collaborated with producer and composer Bill Laswell and vocalist Gigi.

== Discography ==
- Daylightless (2007)
- Lodge (2008)
- Homefree (2009)
- Serendipity (2011)
- Selected Giveaway Goodies (2012)
- Departure (2013)
- Strange Lights (2015)
- Polar (2015)
- The Silent Watcher (2017)
- Valoton Project (2018)
- Zero Two (2022)
- Old Tracker Stuff (2022)
- Classy Coffee Cuts (2023)
