= Out of the Dark (O.G. Funk album) =

Studio album by O.G. Funk (Billy Bass Nelson)
- Released: 1993
- Recorded: 1993
- Genre: Funk
- Length: 50:48
- Label: Rykodisc
- Producer: Billy Bass Nelson, Bill Laswell

Professional ratings
Review scores
Source	Rating
AllMusic	3/5 stars

Out of the Dark is the first solo album by original Parliament-Funkadelic bassist Billy Bass Nelson, released under the name O.G. Funk. The album was released in 1993 by Polystar records in Japan and by Rykodisc in the U.S. and the United Kingdom the following year. It was produced by Nelson and Bill Laswell as part of Laswell's Black Arc Series. The album features re-workings of various early Funkadelic tracks as well as original material. Out of the Dark is dedicated to fellow P-Funk musician Eddie Hazel, who had died a year prior to the release of the album.

== Track listing ==
1. "Yeah, Yeah, Yeah" (James Whipper, Melvin Glover, William Nelson)
2. "Funk is in the House" (James Whipper, William Nelson)
3. "Funkadelic Groupie" (Bronx Style Bob, William Nelson)
4. "Music for My Brother" (William Nelson)
5. "I've Been Alone" (James Whipper, Melvin Glover, William Nelson, James Long)
6. "I Wanna Know" (James Whipper, William Nelson)
7. "Don't Take Your Love From Me" (William Nelson)
8. "Out of the Dark" (William Nelson, James Long)
9. "Angie" (James Whipper, William Nelson)

== Personnel ==
- Bass–Billy Bass Nelson
- Drums–Jerome Brailey
- Guitars–Billy Spruill, Blake Smith, Spacey T. Singleton
- Keyboards–Bernie Worrell
- Vocals–Billy Bass Nelson, Bernard Fowler, Gary Cooper, Prince Whipper Whip
- Group vocals–Billy Bass Nelson, Gary Cooper, Bernie Worrell, Peter Wetherbee, C-Dog, Marque Gilmore, J. Maximina Juson, Chris Ashley, Sekenya Nelson, Archie Ford, Latasha Natasha Diggs
