= Horses & Trees =

Studio album by Ginger Baker
- Released: 6 January 1986
- Recorded: September–November 1985
- Genre: Jazz fusion
- Length: 34:13
- Label: Celluloid
- Producer: Bill Laswell

Ginger Baker chronology
| From Humble Oranges (1983) | Horses & Trees (1986) | Middle Passage (1990) |

Professional ratings
Review scores
| Source | Rating |
|---|---|
| AllMusic | 4.5/5 stars |

Horses & Trees is an album by the English drummer Ginger Baker, released on 6 January 1986 by Celluloid Records. The album is entirely instrumental and contains six dance-oriented songs.

== Track listing ==
1. "Interlock" (Bill Laswell, Daniel Ponce, Nicky Skopelitis, Foday Musa Suso) - 4:55
2. "Dust To Dust" (Laswell) - 5:29
3. "Satou" (Laswell, Suso, Aïyb Dieng) - 5:20
4. "Uncut" (Laswell, Ponce, Skopelitis, Suso, Ginger Baker) - 6:48
5. "Mountain Time" (Baker, Dieng) - 6:04
6. "Makuta" (Baker, Dieng, Laswell, Suso) - 5:34

== Personnel ==
- Ginger Baker - drums
- Aïyb Dieng - chatan; talking drum (tracks 1, 3–6); bells (tracks 1, 3, 4, 6)
- Foday Musa Suso - dousongonni (tracks 1, 4), kalimba (tracks 3, 6) nyanyer (tracks 3, 6)
- Daniel Ponce - bata (tracks 1, 2, 4), bells (tracks 1, 3–5)
- Naná Vasconcelos - berimbau (tracks 3, 6), cuica (tracks 3, 6), voice (tracks 3, 6), shaker (tracks 3, 6)
- Nicky Skopelitis - 12-string guitar (tracks 1, 2, 4, 6), 6-string guitars (track 1)
- Bill Laswell - bass (tracks 1, 2, 4), 6-string bass (track 2), slide guitar (track 2)
- Bernie Worrell - organ (tracks 1, 2, 4)
- Robert Musso - organ (track 6)
- Lakshminarayana Shankar - violin (tracks 1, 2, 4)
- Grandmixer D.ST - turntable (track 3)
