= Baselines (album) =

Studio album by Bill Laswell
- Released: June 14, 1983
- Recorded: March, 1982 at OAO Studio, Brooklyn, NY
- Genre: Jazz-funk, dub
- Length: 33:16
- Label: Elektra
- Producer: Material

Bill Laswell chronology
Baselines (1983)	Low Life (1987)

Professional ratings
Review scores
Source	Rating
AllMusic	3.5/5 stars
Robert Christgau	B
The Encyclopedia of Popular Music	3/5 stars
MusicHound Rock: The Essential Album Guide	4/5 stars
Spin Alternative Record Guide	8/10

Baselines is the debut album of American composer Bill Laswell. It was released on June 14, 1983, by Elektra Records.

== Critical reception ==
The Spin Alternative Record Guide wrote that the album "has no trouble conjuring up strong pop-inflected atmospheres."

== Track listing ==
Side one
No.	Title	Writer(s)	Length
1.	"Activate"	Michael Beinhorn, Bill Laswell	3:20
2.	"Work Song"	Michael Beinhorn, Bill Laswell, George Lewis	7:11
3.	"Hindsight"	Martin Bisi, Bill Laswell	3:54
4.	"Uprising"	Bill Laswell	1:03

Side two
No.	Title	Writer(s)	Length
1.	"Barricade"	Michael Beinhorn, Bill Laswell, George Lewis	4:06
2.	"Upright Man"	Michael Beinhorn, Bill Laswell	3:50
3.	"Moving Target"	Michael Beinhorn, Bill Laswell	1:51
4.	"Lowlands"	Michael Beinhorn, Bill Laswell	4:24
5.	"Conservation"	Bill Laswell	4:51

== Personnel ==
Adapted from the Baselines liner notes.

Musicians

- Michael Beinhorn – Prophet-5, synthesizer, shortwave, tape (A1, A2, A4, B1, B2, B4, B5)
- Ralph Carney – bass saxophone and contrabass clarinet (A1, A2, B1)
- Fred Frith – guitar and violin (A4, B1, B4, B5)
- George Lewis – trombone (A1, A2, B1, B4)
- Ronald Shannon Jackson – drums (A1, A4, B1, B4, B5)
- Bill Laswell – Ibanez 8-string, Fender 6-string, Fender Fretless Precision, Music Man Sting Ray, Steinberger bass
- David Moss – voice, steel drum and percussion (A3, B5)
- Daniel Ponce – congas (A2, A3, B2, B4)
- Phillip Wilson – drums (A2)

Technical personnel

- Martin Bisi – recording, drums, percussion (A3, B2, B3)
- Material – producer
- Howie Weinberg – mastering

== Release history ==
Region	Date	Label	Format	Catalog
United States	1983	Elektra	LP, CS	60221
United States	1983	Celluloid New York	LP	CEL NY 6005
United States	1984	Celluloid	CD	CELCD 5505
United Kingdom	1984	Rough Trade	LP	ROUGH 51
Portugal	1997	Charly	CD	CPCD 8284
