= Low Life (Peter Brötzmann and Bill Laswell album) =

Studio album by Peter Brötzmann/Bill Laswell
- Released: May 12, 1987
- Recorded: January 3–6, 1987 at B.C. Studios, Brooklyn, NY
- Genre: Free jazz
- Length: 40:35
- Label: Celluloid

Peter Brötzmann chronology
Go-No-Go (1987)	Low Life (1987)	Réservé (1989)

Bill Laswell chronology
Baselines (1983)	Low Life (1987)	Hear No Evil (1988)

Professional ratings
Review scores
Source	Rating
Allmusic	3/5 stars

Low Life is a collaborative album by Peter Brötzmann and Bill Laswell. It was released on May 12, 1987 by Celluloid Records.

== Track listing ==
All music is composed by Peter Brötzmann and Bill Laswell, except "Locomotive" by Thelonious Monk.

No.	Title	Length
1.	"Death Rattle"	4:25
2.	"Low Life"	3:30
3.	"Disengage"	3:00
4.	"Locomotive"	3:41
5.	"Barrier"	4:06
6.	"Wheeling Vultures"	3:50
7.	"Curved Dog"	1:33
8.	"Abasement"	1:38
9.	"Land One"	8:09
10.	"Tingle Hairs"	4:11
11.	"The Last Detective"	2:32

== Personnel ==
Adapted from the Low Life liner notes.

Musicians

- Peter Brötzmann – bass saxophone, cover art
- Bill Laswell – electric bass

Technical personnel

- Martin Bisi – recording, Mixing
- Thi-Linh Le – photography

== Release history ==
Region	Date	Label	Format	Catalog
United States	1987	Celluloid	CD, LP	CELL 5016
United States	1993	Celluloid	CD	CELD 5016
Germany	1998	Charly	CD	CDGR 209
