= Markus Stockhausen =

German trumpeter (born 1957)

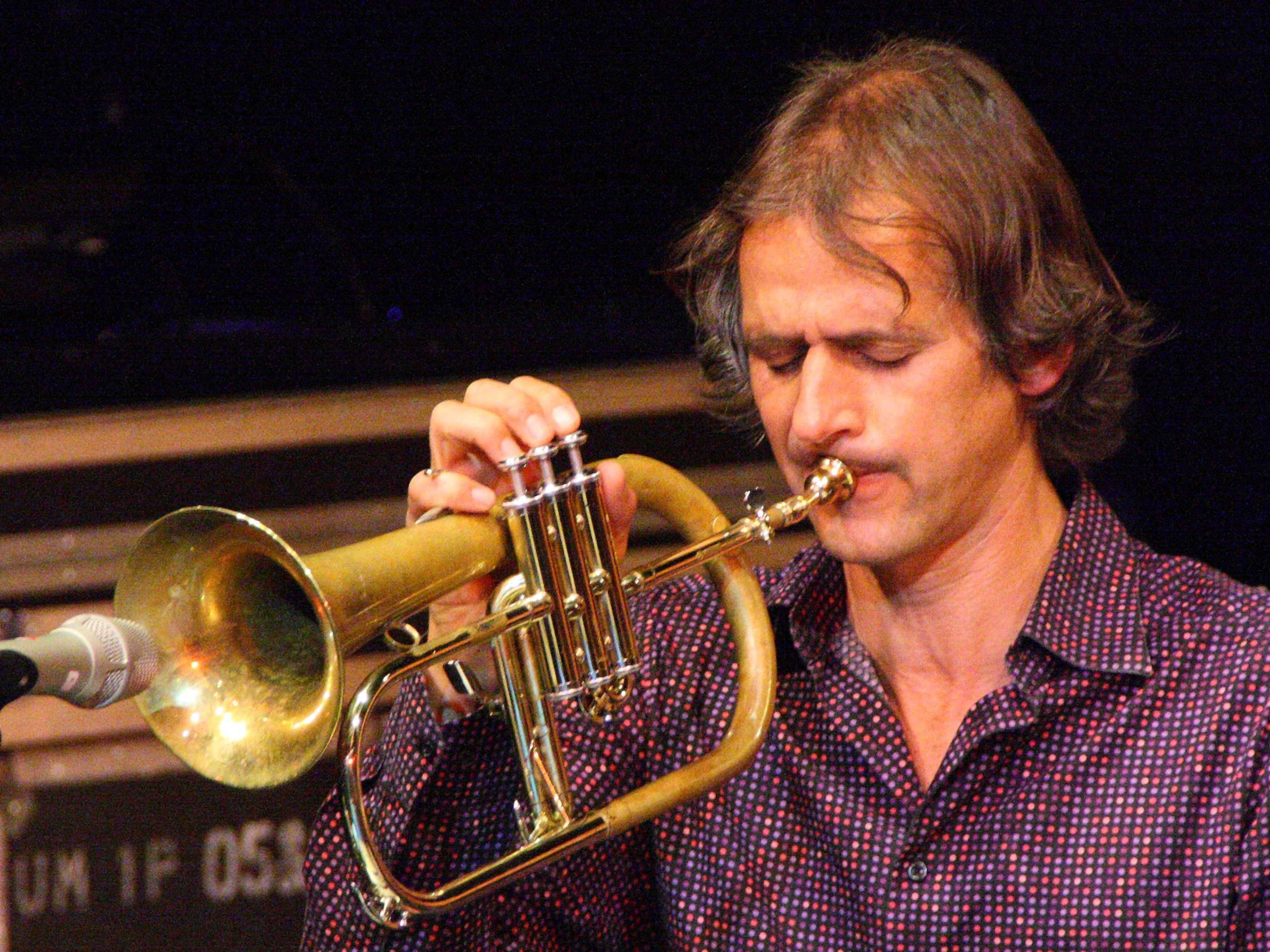
- Markus Stockhausen at TFF Rudolstadt in 2009

Background information
- Born: 2 May 1957 (age 69); Cologne, Germany
- Genres: Jazz, classical, avant-garde
- Occupations: Musician, composer
- Instrument: Trumpet
- Years active: 1990s–present
- Labels: ECM, Dark Companion Records, Aktivraum, ACT Music, Okeh Records, Enja Records, Intuition Records
- Website: www.markusstockhausen.de

Markus Stockhausen (born 2 May 1957) is a German trumpeter and composer. His recordings and performances have typically alternated between jazz and chamber or opera music, the latter often in collaboration with his father, composer Karlheinz Stockhausen.

== Biography ==
Born in Cologne, West Germany, he is the son of composer Karlheinz Stockhausen and the pianist and pedagogue Doris Stockhausen. At age four he appeared as "child at play" in his father's theatre piece Originale. He received his first piano lessons at age six, and at age twelve he began to play the trumpet. He attended the music secondary school in Cologne.

Concerts and festival appearances, also for the Goethe Institute, have taken him around the world. In November 2008 he gave the first performance of Freedom Variations, a composition for trumpet and chamber ensemble written by Italian composer Lorenzo Ferrero.

The Markus Stockhausen Group (with Jeroen van Vliet p, Christian Thomé dr, Jörg Brinkmann cello) released on 27 August 2021 the album Tales.

== Discography ==
- Aparis (ECM, 1990)
- Cosi Lontano...Quasi Dentro (ECM, 1989)
- Köln Musik Fantasy (1991)
- Stockhausen: Michaels Reise (ECM, 1992)
- Despite the Fire-Fighters' Efforts... (Polygram/ECM/Universal, 1993)
- New Colours of Piccolo Trumpet (EMI Classics, 1993)
- Stockhausen: Oberlippentanz; Ave; Tierkreis (Trio-Version) (Stockhausen-Verlag, 1993)
- Stockhausen: Aries; Klavierstück XIII (Stockhausen-Verlag, 1994)
- Clown (EMI, 1995)
- Possible Worlds (CMP, 1995)
- Cologne Music Fantasy (Largo, 1996)
- Sol Mestizo (ACT, 1996)
- Markus Stockhausen Plays Karlheinz Stockhausen (EMI Classics, 1998)
- Solo I (Aktivraum, 2000)
- Still Light (MA, 2000)
- In Deiner Nahe (aka Close to You) (Aktivraum, 2001)
- Karta (ECM, 2001)
- Joyosa (Enja, 2002)
- Lichtblick: Prima, Altrove... (Aktivraum, 2004)
- Nonduality (Aktivraum, 2004)
- Thinking About (Aktivraum, 2004)
- Mozart, La Nuit Jazz 'n' Groove (Nocturne, 2005)
- Es War Einmal...Instanti Infiniti (Aktivraum, 2007)
- Streams (Enja, 2007)
- Abendglühen (Aktivraum, 2008)
- Electric Treasures: Live in Bonn (Aktivraum, 2008)
- No Matter (Metastation, 2008)
- Symbiosis: Werke von Markus Stockhausen für Klarinette und Trompete und Streichorchester (Aktivraum, 2008)
- Other Presences (Sargasso, 2008)
- Symphonic Colours (2009)
- Spaces & Spheres: Intuitive Music (Wergo, 2013)
- Markus Stockhausen and the Metropole Orkest (Intuition, 2013)
- Atlas (2015)
- Alba (ECM/Universal, 2016)
- Hamdelaneh - Intimate dialogues (with Alireza Mortazavi) (Dark Companion, 2019)

- Markus Stockhausen Group: Tales (o-tone music, 2021)
- Reverie (with Luca Formentini) (Dark Companion, 2023)

=== As sideman ===
With Rainer Brüninghaus

- Continuum (ECM, 1983)

With Ralph Towner

- City of Eyes (ECM, 1988)

With Lebowski

- Goodbye My Joy (Lebowski, 2013)

With Gaspare Bernardi

- Stranger at home (Incipit/Egea, 2018)

== Sources ==
- Sanz, Pablo (2006). "Markus Stockhausen, una mirada fuera de plano". Scherzo: Revista de música 21, no. 210 (July–August): 136–37.
- Tarr, Edward H. (2001). "Stockhausen, Markus". The New Grove Dictionary of Music and Musicians, second edition, edited by Stanley Sadie and John Tyrrell. London: Macmillan Publishers.
