= Hideo Yamaki =

Hideo Yamaki 山木秀夫
- Born: December 22, 1952 (age 73); Japan
- Genres: Jazz fusion
- Occupation: Musician
- Instrument: Drums
- Member of: Kondo IMA

Hideo Yamaki (山木 秀夫, Yamaki Hideo; born December 22, 1952) is a Japanese jazz drummer and percussionist. He is known for being the long time drummer for Toshinori Kondo's band Kondo IMA. He also collaborated with Arto Lindsay, John Zorn, Sakamoto Ryuichi, Hosono Haruomi, Robert Palmer and Bill Laswell.
