= What's Bootsy Doin'? =

Studio album by Bootsy Collins
- Released: September 1988
- Recorded: 1988
- Studio: Pearl, Canton, MI
- Genre: Funk, electro-funk
- Length: 42:21
- Label: Columbia
- Producer: Bootsy Collins

Bootsy Collins chronology
The One Giveth, the Count Taketh Away (1982)	What's Bootsy Doin'? (1988)	Jungle Bass (1990)

Professional ratings
Review scores
Source	Rating
AllMusic	4.5/5 stars
The Village Voice	A−

What's Bootsy Doin'? is a 1988 album by Parliament-Funkadelic bassist Bootsy Collins. The album was released by Columbia Records and was his first album after a six-year hiatus from the music scene. The album reunites Collins with former P-Funk players Bernie Worrell, Fred Wesley and Gary "Mudd Bone" Cooper, and also features newcomers including Mico Wave and Godmoma.

What's Bootsy Doin'? was also released in Japan in the form of a limited edition metal box, dubbed "Syber-Funk Model"(CBS/Sony 34DP 5535~7). Also included was a booklet entitled "Cult Beat Shock" which gives an overview of other dance-oriented performers on the Columbia record label.

== Track listing ==
1. "Party on Plastic (What's Bootsy Doin'?)" (Bootsy Collins, Vicki Vee) 3:57 (released as a 7" single-Columbia 38-07991 and 12" single-Columbia 44 07878)
2. "Subliminal Seduction (Funk-Me Dirty)" (Wes Boatman, George Clinton, Bootsy Collins) 3:31
3. "Leakin'" (Trey Stone, George Clinton, Bootsy Collins) 4:16
4. "Shock-It-To-Me" (Bootsy Collins, Bill Laswell) 4:57
5. "1st One 2 the Egg Wins (The Human Race)" (Wes Boatman, Bootsy Collins)} 4:21 (released as a single-Columbia–38-08496 and 12" single-Columbia–44 08173)
6. "Love Song" (Trey Stone, Joe Harris, George Clinton, Bootsy Collins) 3:33
7. "(I Wannabee) Kissin' U" (Mico Wave, Gary Cooper, Bootsy Collins) 4:18
8. "*-ing the Love Gun" (Gary Cooper, Wes Boatman, Bootsy Collins) 3:45
9. "Yo-Moma-Loves-Ya" (Mama Collins, Bootsy Collins) 5:22
10. "Save What's Mine for Me" (Bootsy Collins) 4:17

== Personnel ==
- Axe Molesters & Guitar Slayers: Ron "Attitude" Jennings, Catfish Collins, Stevie "No Wonder" Salas, Bootsy Collins
- Computer Smashers & Keyboard Slashers: Trey "Goldfish" Stone, Wes Boatman, Mico Wave, Bootsy Collins
- Unfairlight Sample Wars: Bootsy Collins
- Skin Thrashers & Bun Smashers, Drum Beaters & Rhythm Cheaters: Bootzilla & Bootsy Collins
- Still 'Horny Horns': Fred Wesley, Maceo Parker, Kush Griffith, Rick Gardner
- Horn Arrangements: Fred Wesley & Bootsy Collins
- String Arrangements: Fred Wesley, Wes Boatman
- String Solo on "Shock-It-To-Me": Billy Bang
- All Drum Programming & Bootsy Wave-U-Lator: Mico Wave
- Computer Talk: Boot-Tron
- Space Basses & Low-End Chasers: Bootsy Collins, Casper & Bootzilla
- (Is Data Bass? & Chocolate Star banged on by: The Player)
- Lead Vocalization & Heavy Metal Aluminum Conversation: Casper, Luv-Gun, Bootzilla, Sugar Crook, Baby Leroy and occasionally Bootsy Collins
- Front Ground Vocal Improvisation: Gary "Mudbone" Cooper, Sly Fox
- Additional Vocals & Musicians: P-Nut Johnson, Vicky Vee, Tony Feldman, George Clinton, Taka Boom, Mallia Franklin, Carolyn Stanford, Anita Walker, Cynthia Girty (Godmoma), Bernard Fowler, Eddie Martinez, Nicky Skopelitis, Bernie Worrell
- Extra Rappers, Clappers, & Finger Snappers: "Billy J" William Johnson,"Oounchworm" Sharir Foreman, "Pretty Fatt", Yolanda Frazier, Mico Wave, Yo-Mama Collins, Uncle Tom & Uncle Al
