= Lord of the Harvest =

Album by Bootsy Collins

Studio album by Bootsy Collins
- Released: 1993
- Recorded: 1993
- Genre: Funk metal
- Length: 43:10
- Label: Rykodisc
- Producer: Bootsy Collins; Bill Laswell

Bootsy Collins chronology
Blasters of the Universe (1993)	Lord of the Harvest (1993)	Keepin' dah Funk Alive 4-1995 (1995)

Professional ratings
Review scores
Source	Rating
AllMusic	4/5 stars

Lord of the Harvest is a 1993 album by Bootsy Collins under the alias Zillatron (a.k.a. Fuzzface) and was produced by Collins and Bill Laswell.

== Background ==
Musically, the album leans toward funk metal, features extensive use of samples and is darker in tone than previous Bootsy Collins albums. The album also has a strong science fiction theme. The album was released as part of Bill Laswell's Black Arc Series. Lord of the Harvest is dedicated to the memory of Parliament-Funkadelic lead guitarist Eddie Hazel who died some months earlier in December 1992.

=== Release history ===
The album was released by the Polystar label in Japan and by Rykodisc in the United States. A remastered version of Lord of the Harvest was reissued in 2003 by Laswell's Innerhythmic label. Some early copies of the album have the first two tracks combined as one.

== Tracks ==
No.	Title	Writer(s)	Length
1.	"C.B.I. Files (Central Bug Intelligence) (spoken word)"	Collins	1:56
2.	"Bugg Lite"	Collins	4:23
3.	"Fuzz Face"	Collins	7:55
4.	"Exterminate"	Collins	2:37
5.	"Smell the Secrets"	Collins, Bill Laswell, Buckethead	3:02
6.	"Count Zero"	Collins, Bill Laswell	5:56
7.	"Bootsy and the Beast"	Collins, Bill Laswell, Buckethead	5:12
8.	"No Fly Zone (The Devil's Playground)"	Collins	6:56
9.	"The Passion Continues"	Collins, Bill Laswell, Buckethead	5:06

== Personnel ==
- Bootsy Collins - space bass, vocals
- Bernie Worrell - keyboards, synthesizers
- Buckethead - electric and acoustic guitars
- Bill Laswell - ambient sounds and noises
- Grandmaster Melle Mel - chant
- Umar Bin Hassan - chant
- Deborah Barsha, Kristen Gray, Momma Collins - vocals
- Brenda Holloway, Patti Willis - backing vocals
