= Touré Kunda =

Senegalese music band

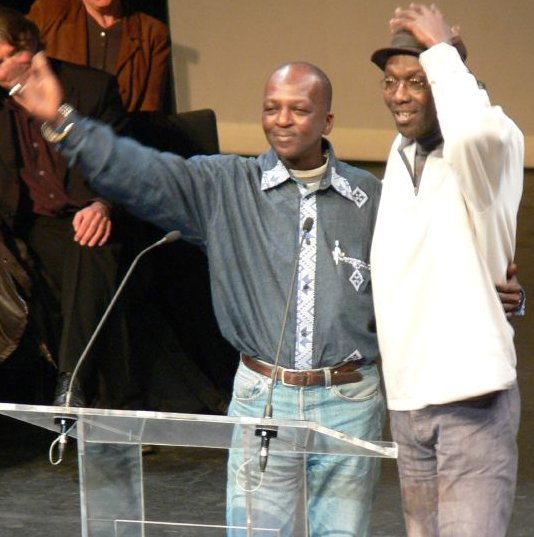
- Ismaïla and Sixu Tidiane Touré performing in 2006

Background information
- Origin: Ziguinchor, Casamance, Senegal
- Genres: world; Mbalax; Reggae
- Years active: 1979–present
- Labels: Wagram Music; Putumayo World Music; Sony
- Members: Sixu Tidiane Touré
- Past members: Ismaïla Touré; Amadou Touré
- Website: www.tourekunda.com

Touré Kunda is a Senegalese band, noted for their musical versatility and political activism. Their 40-year career encompasses recordings in over six languages and collaborations with well-known musicians such as Carlos Santana and Talking Heads. They have had considerable success in Africa and Europe and are active in social causes such as children's rights and advocates for the homeless and rights for immigrants.

== Biography ==
Born twenty-two days apart in 1950 in Ziguinchor in Casamance, Senegal, Ismaïla and Sixu Tidiane Touré were introduced to music by their elder brother Amadou, a singer and musician.

They moved to Paris, France, in 1979 to complete their musical education. They worked their way up in the Parisian scene. The group sings in Soninké, Wolof, Fula, Mandingo, Diola, and Portuguese creole, reflecting the multilingual mixture of the people of Casamance.

Their first album, Ismaïla do Sixu, was released in 1979. It was followed by É'mma Africa in 1980 and Touré Kunda in 1981. In 1985, following the death of their brother and mentor Amadou, Ismael and Sixu Tidiane toured throughout Africa.

Upon returning to France, they found considerable success and critical acclaim among the French music press. In 1992, they were invited to play for Nelson Mandela at the Courtyard of Human Rights.

In 1999, their album Légendes, a retrospective of their 20-year career, was released. Shortly thereafter, they participated in Carlos Santana's album Supernatural and toured with him. A greatest hits album, Best Of, was released in 2006. Another album, Santhiaba, came out in 2008.

Ismaïla and Sixu Tidiane Touré are members of the sponsoring committee of the United Nations' Decade for the Promotion of a Culture of Peace and Non-Violence for the Children of the World.

On 27 February 2023, Ismaïla died in Paris, France, at the age of 73.

== Discography ==
- 1980: É'mma Africa
- 1981: Touré Kunda
- 1983: Amadou Tilo
- 1984: Casamance au clair de lune (Toure Kunda - distribution: Wagram Music)
- 1984: Paris Ziguinchor (Live) (Toure Kunda - distribution: Wagram Music)
- 1985: Natalia
- 1986: Toubab Bi (Toure Kunda - distribution: Wagram Music)
- 1987: Best of Touré Kunda (Toure Kunda - distribution: Wagram Music)
- 1988: Karadindi
- 1990: Salam
- 1991: Sounké (Live)
- 1992: Sili Beto
- 1996: Mouslai (Toure Kunda - distribution: Wagram Music)
- 1996: The Touré Kunda Collection (Putumayo World Music)
- 1999: Légende (Compilation, Sony)
- 2000: Terra Saabi (Toure Kunda - distribution: Wagram Music)
- 2008: Santhiaba (Toure Kunda - distribution: Wagram Music)
- 2018: Lambi Golo

== See also ==
- Music of Senegal

== Bibliography ==
- (in French) Nathalie Steinberg, Touré Kunda, Paris, Encre, 1985 ISBN 2-86418-268-8
