= Lance Carter (musician) =

American drummer

- Born: May 11, 1955; New Brunswick, New Jersey, U.S.
- Died: November 1, 2006 (aged 51)
- Genres: Avant-garde jazz, free jazz, jazz fusion
- Occupation: Musician
- Instrument: drums

Lance Carter (May 11, 1955 – November 1, 2006) was an American jazz drummer and percussionist. A musician for more than 30 years, he is recognized for his work with Grammy Award-winning artist Cassandra Wilson and as a long-time collaborator of Sonny Sharrock, with whom he recorded the theme song to the Cartoon Network series Space Ghost Coast to Coast.

== Biography ==
Born in New Brunswick, New Jersey, Carter graduated in 1973 from Highland Park High School and began attending the Berklee College of Music, where he studied percussion. In 1976, he returned to New Jersey to play with the dance band Network. A resident of Woodbridge Township, New Jersey, he died in November 2006 from primary systemic amyloidosis, an incurable bone marrow disease.

== Partial discography ==
- Raw Meet (Intakt, 2004) with Elliott Sharp and Melvin Gibbs
- Live at the Bowery Poetry Project (2007) with Bill Laswell and Robert Musso

With Sonny Sharrock

- Highlife (Enemy, 1990)
- Space Ghost Coast to Coast (Cartoon Network, 1994)

With Cassandra Wilson

- Blue Light 'til Dawn (Blue Note, 1993)

With Jair-Rôhm Parker Wells and Reeves Gabrels as Doom Dogs

- Personal Nuclear Assault (Musso Music/MuWorks Records 2007 but recorded earlier)
