= Robert Musso =

Guitarist, composer, engineer, and producer based in New York City

Robert Musso is a New York City-based guitarist, composer, engineer, and producer. He is the founder of the independent record label MuWorks as well as the record label - MussoMusic.com. Over the course of a 40-year career, Musso has produced, mixed, remixed, played on, written, or contributed more than 2000 records, CDs, movie soundtracks, on every continent in the world except Antarctica.

== Biography ==
After graduating from Rutgers University with two degrees (Economics and Recording Engineering), Musso began obtaining studio work as a musician, engineer and producer. During this period, he worked with a wide variety of artists, including Stevie Wonder, Bob Dylan, Mick Jagger, the Dalai Lama, Miles Davis, Al Green, Bob Marley, Herbie Hancock, Sting, Carlos Santana, Jimi Hendrix, The Seventy Sevens, David Bowie, George Clinton, Dave Matthews, Ornette Coleman, John Zorn, Peter Gabriel, The Ramones, Iggy Pop, Blondie, Whitney Houston, Sly & Robbie, Fine Young Cannibals, Pharoah Sanders, William Burroughs, Julian Schnabel, Bootsy Collins, The Last Poets, Ozzy Osbourne and Steve Vai. In 1981, he began a long and fruitful association with Bill Laswell. These projects included Material's Hallucination Engine, Sly and Robbie's Rhythm Killers (1987), One Down with Whitney Houston, and the multinational Method of Defiance project. He has also recorded with Tom Waits (Raindogs), Ginger Baker (Horses & Trees) and P.M. Dawn (The Bliss Album). His work for Miles Davis, Jimi Hendrix, and Bob Marley consisted of album remixes and done posthumously.

As a musician, Musso studied jazz guitar with Ted Dunbar and played in the Livingston Jazz Ensemble. He has played on recordings by Tom Waits, P.M. Dawn, Ginger Baker, Material, Machine Gun, Lunar Ensemble, and others.

In 1986, Musso founded MuWorks Records in order to promote improvised music. Artists who have released CDs through MuWorks include Thomas Chapin, Last Exit, Lunar Bear Ensemble, Musso himself and Machine Gun.

Beginning in 1986, Thomas Chapin and Musso led the downtown improvisational ensemble, Machine Gun. Three of their concerts have been preserved on CD.

He is a member of the Audio Engineering Society (AES), The Society of Motion Picture and Television Engineers (SMPTE), and is a Certified Audio Engineer by the Society of Broadcast Engineers (SBE). He is also a registered NYC 9/11 First Responder.

== Discography ==
Solo work (as Robert Musso)

- Absolute Music (1989)
- Active Resonance (1992)
- Innermedium (1999, DIW Records)
- Live at the Bowery Poetry Project

Solo work (as Transonic - these releases appeared on the Fax label and Fax sub-label Ambient World)

- Downstream Illusion (7/94)
- Virtual Current (12/94)
- Future Primitive (10/95)

with Machine Gun

- Machine Gun (1988)
- Open Fire (1989)
- Pass the Ammo (1992)
