= Yasuhiro Yoshigaki =

Yasuhiro Yoshigaki 芳垣安洋
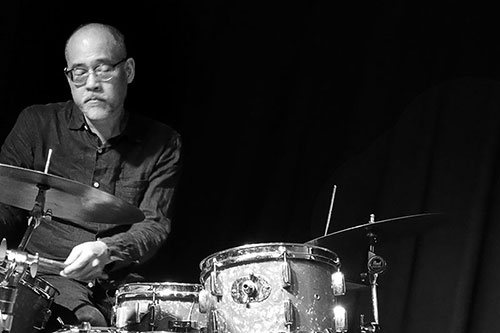
- Aarhus, Denmark 2015

Background information
- Born: 1959 (age 66–67); Nishinomiya, Hyōgo, Japan
- Genres: Jazz, Free jazz, Free improvisation, Experimental music, Rock
- Occupations: Drummer, percussionist
- Instruments: Drums, percussion
- Years active: 1980s–present
- Member of: Rovo, Altered States, ONJQ, Orquesta Libre, Orquesta Nudge! Nudge!, Emergency!, Vincent Atmicus
- Website: y-yoshigaki.com/en/

Yasuhiro Yoshigaki (Japanese: 芳垣安洋; born 1959) is a Japanese drummer and percussionist, noted for his command of rhythm in jazz and ensemble settings. He is also highly regarded in free improvisation and has collaborated with musicians in Japan and abroad, including Otomo Yoshihide and John Zorn. He is one of the twin drummers of the post-rock band Rovo and the leader of Vincent Atmicus, an ensemble distinguished by twin drums, strings, brass, and layered percussion to create dense, polyrhythmic textures. He has also led long-running projects as a bandleader, including Orquesta Libre and Orquesta Nudge! Nudge!.

== Career ==
=== 1970s ===
Yoshigaki began playing drums in his final year of high school, encouraged by a friend. After entering Kwansei Gakuin University, he started performing jazz, inspired by Weather Report’s Black Market and Jaco Pastorius’s Jaco Pastorius. While still a student he performed at live houses and jazz clubs in the Kansai region.

=== 1980s ===
From 1984 for three years he served as a regular drummer at the Osaka jazz club Royal Horse. Seeking to start a band he wanted to hear on the local scene, Yoshigaki conceived the ensemble First Edition in 1985 and launched it in 1986. The original members included Yutaka Ohara (tb), Itayuki Shioya (as), Eiichiro Arasaki (ts), Makoto Aoyagi (p, as), and Yosuke Inoue (b; later replaced by Osamu Mihara). The group combined arranged material with open forms; later Kazuhisa Uchihashi (g) joined and activities expanded to Tokyo and Nagoya. As an offshoot, he co-founded Altered States around 1990; early sets included rock-like and vocal numbers, moving toward fully improvised performances by Mosaic (1994). He also formed the improvising trio SIGHTS with Yutaka Ohara and Hiroshi Funato; in 1995 the trio recorded Tatta and toured.

=== 1990s ===
He pursued further projects, including a duo with Sam Bennett; the large-ensemble Brass Chant (up to twelve players); prompter for the Kansai edition of John Zorn’s Cobra; and the acoustic trio Hōrakuya with Yuji Katsui and Yoshinori Motoki. Performing more frequently in Tokyo, he met Otomo Yoshihide (leading to Ground Zero), Daisuke Fuwa (Shibusashirazu), and Yuji Katsui (Rovo). Following the 1995 Great Hanshin–Awaji Earthquake, he relocated to Tokyo in 1997. By 1999 he had joined Otomo's ONJQ and Naruyoshi Kikuchi's Date Course Pentagon Royal Garden (DCPRG), and launched his leader band Vincent Atmicus.

=== 2000s ===
During the 2000s, Yoshigaki was active across experimental jazz, improvisation, and rock. As one of the two drummers of Rovo, alongside Yoichi Okabe, he helped develop the band's interlocking rhythmic approach, in which the two drummers combined different patterns to create a single rhythmic structure. Rovo performed at Fuji Rock Festival in 2001 and 2003.

His collaboration with Otomo Yoshihide continued through the New Jazz Quintet (ONJQ) and its expansion into the New Jazz Orchestra (ONJO). A review in Paris Transatlantic singled out Yoshigaki's explosive drumming on ONJQ's Live in Lisbon, recorded at the 2004 Jazz em Agosto festival. With ONJO, he participated in a larger ensemble whose music moved between restrained passages, complex textures, and intense collective improvisation, documented on the live albums Live Vol. 1: Series Circuit and Live Vol. 2: Parallel Circuit (2007). Otomo later identified Yoshigaki as a major influence on his guitar playing during the 2000s, explaining that he developed aspects of his rhythmic phrasing and accentuation in response to Yoshigaki's drumming.

Alongside these collaborations, Yoshigaki developed his own ensembles, including Vincent Atmicus, Emergency!, and the percussion-focused Orquesta Nudge! Nudge!, established in 2003. A review of Vincent Atmicus's Vincent II (2004) in Jazz in Japan noted that Yoshigaki composed most of the material and emphasized the carefully constructed yet flexible arrangements, which allowed all eight musicians to contribute their individual voices. Orquesta Nudge! Nudge! explored percussion ensemble music through composed material and improvisation, releasing Batuka! (2005) and Rhythm Chant (2008).

He also recorded and performed with Otomo Yoshihide and Bill Laswell under the name Soup, issuing studio and live recordings.

In 2007, Yoshigaki collaborated with Argentine percussionist Santiago Vázquez in the project Anima Mundi. The project brought together Japanese and Argentine musicians and produced two albums, Primer Encuentro and Segundo Puente.

=== 2010s ===
His large ensemble Vincent Atmicus continued to appear live, including documented concerts at Shinjuku Pit Inn on 12 June 2010 (official archive) and 9 December 2010 (independent review). He also launched and led the large-ensemble project Orquesta Libre (active since 2011), which reinterprets familiar repertoire. In July 2012 the group issued two debut albums and performed in Europe (including the Copenhagen Jazz Festival) and at FUJI ROCK FESTIVAL ’12. A precursor iKnoW project—centered on Thelonious Monk's music (the name "iKNOW" reads "MONK" in reverse)—is documented in a 2012 guide to Japanese jazz (p.166). His project MoGoToYoYo appeared at the Aarhus Jazz Festival and the Copenhagen Jazz Festival in July 2017, as documented by festival listings and a review.

=== 2020s ===
Yoshigaki remains active with Rovo and other ensembles and continues to perform in Japan and abroad. He leads the live unit iKnoW Electric Re-Bop Double Band, developed in the 2020s as a continuation of his iKnoW concept. In 2025, he recorded Hatsu-Arashi with contrabassist Takashi Seo and pianist Achim Kaufmann; the album was reviewed in the April–May 2026 issue of the German jazz magazine Jazz Podium.

== Gallery ==
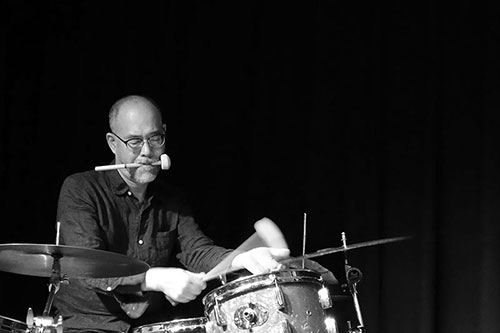

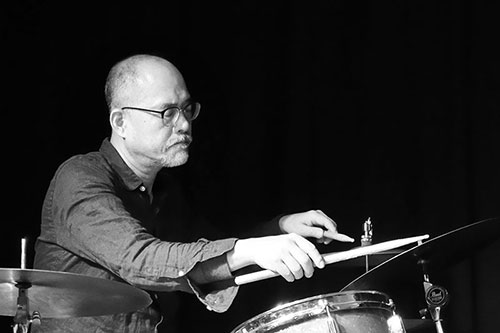

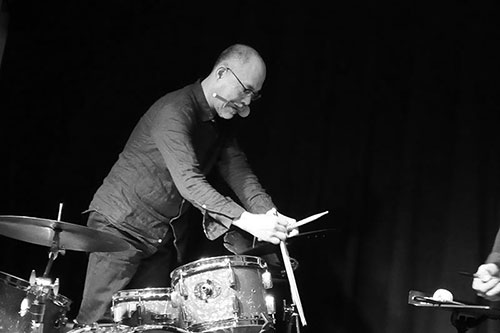

== Discography ==
=== Emergency! ===
- Loveman Plays Psychedelic Swing (2002)
- Loveman Prays For Psychical Sing (2003)
- Live In Copenhagen (2010)

=== Otomo Yoshihide, Bill Laswell and Yasuhiro Yoshigaki ===
- Soup (2003)
- Soup Live (2004)

=== Fernando Saunders / Yasuhiro Yoshigaki ===
- Devotion (2005)

=== Vincent Atmicus ===
Yasuhiro Yoshigaki (ds), Yoichi Okabe (ds), Yuji Katsui (vl), Keisuke Ota (vl), Taisei Aoki (tb), Osamu Matsumoto (tb), Hiroaki Mizutani (b), Kumiko Takara (per), Naruyoshi Kikuchi (sax; left the ensemble after the May 2003 performance)

- VINCENT I (2002)
- VINCENT II (2004)
- VINCENT III (2005)

=== Anima Mundi (Vazquez-Yoshigaki project) ===
- PRIMER ENCUENTRO (2007)
- SEGUNDO PUENTE (2007)

=== Orquesta Nudge! Nudge! ===
- BATUKA! (2005)
- Rhythm CHANT (2008)

=== Orquesta Libre ===
- UTA NO KA TA TI (2012)
- Can't Help Falling in Love (2012)

=== Orquesta Libre + Suga Dairo + RON×II ===
- Rockin’ In Rhythm (2014)
- plays DUKE (2014)

=== Shoro Club ===
Yasuhiro Yoshigaki (ds, per), Otomo Yoshihide (g), Daisuke Fuwa (ac-b, el-b)

- from 1959 (2017)

=== On The Mountain ===
- ON THE MOUNTAIN (2020)

=== Takashi Seo / Achim Kaufmann / Yasuhiro Yoshigaki ===
- Hatsu-Arashi (2025)

=== Shanir Ezra Blumenkranz & Yasuhiro Yoshigaki ===
- WE PRAY (2026)

== Collaborations ==
- BOYCOTT RHYTHM MACHINE (2004)
- BOYCOTT RHYTHM MACHINE II – VERSUS – (2006)

== As a sideman ==
- Gyakuyunyū: Kōwankyoku (2014)
