= Orquesta Nudge! Nudge! =

- Origin: Tokyo, Japan
- Genres: Jazz, Experimental music, Free improvisation
- Years active: 2003–present
- Labels: Glamorous Records, EWE

Orquesta Nudge! Nudge! (Japanese: オルケスタ・ナッジ！ナッジ！) is a Japanese percussion ensemble founded in 2003 by drummer and percussionist Yasuhiro Yoshigaki. Based in Tokyo, the group brings together musicians from jazz, experimental music, and other musical backgrounds, combining composed material with collective improvisation.

== History and activities ==
Yoshigaki founded Orquesta Nudge! Nudge! in 2003 as an ensemble centred on percussion instruments. Its music draws on polyrhythms, traditional percussion practices and contemporary experimental music. The group's first album, Batuka, was released in September 2005, followed by Rhythm CHANT in October 2008.

In 2008, the ensemble was featured in the fourth issue of Percussion Magazine, which included a feature on the group's musicians and five exclusive recordings accompanying the magazine.

The group has performed at music festivals and concert venues, including Fuji Rock-related events, Ensembles Tokyo and La Folle Journée Tokyo. Its activities also include percussion workshops involving both professional musicians and members of the public.

In 2019, members of Orquesta Nudge! Nudge! and participants in its percussion workshops contributed to performances associated with the music of the NHK historical drama Idaten, composed by Otomo Yoshihide.

== Musical style and performance ==
Orquesta Nudge! Nudge! uses a wide range of percussion instruments, combining structured compositions with improvisation. Its performances explore layered rhythms, contrasting timbres and collective rhythmic patterns.

In a 2015 article, Time Out Tokyo described the group as an ambitious percussion ensemble whose performances demonstrated the possibilities of orchestral music without conventional melodic instruments. The review also noted the group's circular stage arrangements at the SuperDeluxe venue in Tokyo.

A review of the ensemble's 2019 performance at La Folle Journée Tokyo in JazzTokyo highlighted its use of a distinctive conducting system for collective improvisation. The critic noted the strong sense of musical structure and groove produced spontaneously by the percussionists under Yoshigaki's direction.

== Members ==
The ensemble's membership has varied over time. Musicians who have participated include:

- Yasuhiro Yoshigaki – drums, percussion; founder and leader
- Yoichi Okabe – percussion
- Kumiko Takara – vibraphone, marimba, percussion
- Mari Sekine – percussion
- Takashi Nakazato – percussion
- Ryudai Kawatani – percussion
- Kosuke Tsuji – percussion
- Yohei Takada – percussion
- Masayuki Chatani – percussion
- Taichi Masuyama – percussion
- Izpon – percussion

== Discography ==
=== Studio albums ===
==== Batuka (2005) ====
Batuka is the debut studio album by Orquesta Nudge! Nudge!, released on 10 September 2005 through Glamorous Records / EWE (catalogue number EWGL-0008). The album features ten musicians drawn from various Tokyo-based ensembles and incorporates elements of African percussion music, gamelan and contemporary experimental music.

According to the album's liner notes, Yasuhiro Yoshigaki composed five tracks individually and co-composed six with Kumiko Takara, three of which also credit Yoichi Okabe.

Track listing

No.	Title	Composer(s)	Length
1	Waltz/PE	Yasuhiro Yoshigaki, Kumiko Takara	5:13
2	Baja Waltz	Yasuhiro Yoshigaki, Kumiko Takara	5:02
3	Rumba #5	Yasuhiro Yoshigaki	8:27
4	N'dung	Yasuhiro Yoshigaki	9:30
5	Oferere/Batuka	Yasuhiro Yoshigaki	8:14
6	Toy 1 (Ancient Story)	Yasuhiro Yoshigaki, Kumiko Takara, Yoichi Okabe	1:25
7	Toy 2 (Romen)	Yasuhiro Yoshigaki, Kumiko Takara, Yoichi Okabe	1:51
8	Vibrapan 7	Yasuhiro Yoshigaki, Kumiko Takara	7:49
9	Toy 3 (Strada)	Yasuhiro Yoshigaki, Kumiko Takara, Yoichi Okabe	0:47
10	Bunbaka 19 ~ Tinga! Tinga!	Yasuhiro Yoshigaki	11:30
11	D'Gong	Yasuhiro Yoshigaki	5:40

Personnel

The following ten musicians are credited in the album booklet:

- Yasuhiro Yoshigaki – drums, percussion, voice
- Yoichi Okabe – percussion, voice
- Kumiko Takara – vibraphone, marimba, percussion, voice
- Ryudai Kawatani – percussion, voice
- Manabu Sakata – drums, percussion, voice
- Mari Sekine – percussion, voice
- Yohei Takada – percussion, voice
- Masayuki Chatani – drums, percussion
- Taichi Masuyama – drums, percussion, voice
- Kenichi Yamakita – percussion, voice

Production credits

- Tatsuki Masuko – recording and mixing
- Hideyuki Matsuhashi – assistant recording engineer
- Shuji Kitamura – mastering (Audio City)
- Hideaki Sasaki – photography and art direction

Recording took place at IRc2 Studio on 8–10 April 2005 and at Float Studio on 11 April. Mixing was completed at Float Studio on 25–28 April, followed by mastering at Audio City on 12 May 2005.

==== Rhythm CHANT (2008) ====
Rhythm CHANT is the second studio album by Orquesta Nudge! Nudge!, released on 16 October 2008 through Glamorous Records (catalogue number GLAM 0001). The album features eleven musicians, with all seven tracks composed and the album produced by Yasuhiro Yoshigaki.

In his liner notes, Yoshigaki described singing and dancing as central themes of the album. He discussed the ensemble's diverse musical backgrounds and its exploration of rhythmic traditions from Africa, Brazil, the Arab world and India, while emphasizing the group's own approach to combining these influences.

Track listing

All compositions by Yasuhiro Yoshigaki.

No.	Title	Composer(s)	Length
1	Hey! Nudge! Nudge!	Yasuhiro Yoshigaki	5:09
2	Sambabala	Yasuhiro Yoshigaki	7:39
3	Civadahl O Berimbau	Yasuhiro Yoshigaki	5:46
4	Claps	Yasuhiro Yoshigaki	9:48
5	Kumba Dance	Yasuhiro Yoshigaki	11:05
6	Turk' Skin 11	Yasuhiro Yoshigaki	11:07
7	Umza Umza en Nubia	Yasuhiro Yoshigaki	4:59

Personnel

The following eleven musicians are credited in the album booklet. Selected instruments are listed below.

- Yasuhiro Yoshigaki – drums, surdo, tamborim, repinique, berimbau, gongs, various percussion, voice
- Yoichi Okabe – djembe, conga, timbau, surdo, berimbau, various percussion, voice
- Kumiko Takara – vibraphone, marimba, conga, slit drum, various percussion, voice
- Ryudai Kawatani – floor tom, snare drum, surdo, repinique, voice
- Masayuki Chatani – floor tom, snare drum, bass drum, surdo, voice
- Taichi Masuyama – floor tom, snare drum, surdo, tamborim, voice
- Mari Sekine – djembe, conga, cowbells, surdo, timbau, voice
- Yohei Takada – steel pan, djembe, asalato, African steel marimba, various percussion, voice
- Takashi Nakazato – djembe, conga, surdo, pandeiro, timbau, voice
- Kosuke Tsuji – conga, djembe
- Izpon – conga, chekere

Production credits

- Yasuhiro Yoshigaki – producer
- Tatsuki Masuko – recording and mixing
- Gregory Germain – assistant recording engineer
- Shuji Kitamura – mastering (Audio City)
- Hideaki Sasaki – photography and art direction
- Workshy-Oishi – artwork
- Imai (arigatainment) – production coordination

Recording took place at Studio Greenbird on 4–6 February 2008 and at Float Studio on 12 and 16 February and 15 March 2008. The album was mixed at Float Studio on 21 and 28 June 2008 and mastered at Audio City on 5 July 2008.
