= Soup (Otomo Yoshihide, Bill Laswell and Yasuhiro Yoshigaki album) =

Studio album by Otomo Yoshihide/ Bill Laswell/Yasuhiro Yoshigaki
- Released: December 10, 2003
- Recorded: Gok Sound, Tokyo, Japan
- Genre: Free improv, psychedelic rock
- Length: 47:46
- Label: P-Vine
- Producer: Shin Terai

Bill Laswell chronology
AFTERMATHematics (2003)	Soup (2003)	A Navel City/No One Is There (2004)

Soup is a collaborative album by Bill Laswell, Yasuhiro Yoshigaki and Otomo Yoshihide. It was released on December 10, 2003 by P-Vine Records.

== Track listing ==
All music is composed by Bill Laswell, Yasuhiro Yoshigaki and Otomo Yoshihide.

No.	Title	Length
1.	"Duck"	11:07
2.	"Mushroom"	9:56
3.	"Crab"	14:13
4.	"Seaweeds"	12:30

== Personnel ==
Adapted from the Soup liner notes.

Musicians

- Bill Laswell – bass guitar, sampler, effects, mixing
- Yasuhiro Yoshigaki – drums, percussion, electronic drums (1), trumpet (4)
- Otomo Yoshihide – guitar, turntables (2, 4), editing

Technical personnel

- James Dellatacoma – assistant engineer
- Chikara Iwai – design
- Michael Fossenkemper – mastering
- Yoshiaki Kondo – recording
- Robert Musso – engineering
- Shin Terai – producer

== Release history ==
Region	Date	Label	Format	Catalog
Japan	2003	P-Vine	CD	PCD-5856
United States	2007	ION	CD	Ion 2022
