= Vincent Atmicus =

- Origin: Japan
- Genres: Experimental, avant-garde, free improvisation, jazz, rock, world music
- Years active: 1999–
- Labels: East Works Entertainment, Glamorous Records

Vincent Atmicus is a Japanese music ensemble formed by drummer Yasuhiro Yoshigaki in the late 1990s.
The group is noted for its unusual instrumentation - twin drums, twin violins, twin trombones, bass, and extensive percussion - and for blending polyrhythms, odd meters, improvisation, rock, and world music elements.

== History ==
The project was launched by Yoshigaki around 1999, drawing on his experiences with Rovo, ONJO, and DCPRG.
The first album Vincent I was released in November 2002 on East Works Entertainment.
This was followed by Vincent II in September 2004 and Vincent III in July 2005 on Glamorous Records.
They performed at venues such as Shinjuku Pit Inn, where release shows were sold out.

The group was also profiled in the bilingual annual magazine Improvised Music from Japan 2002–2003, which included interviews and articles in both Japanese and English.

In the 2010s, Vincent Atmicus continued occasional live activity.

== Musical style ==
Vincent Atmicus is characterized by the use of polyrhythms, layered instrumental textures, and collective improvisation.
The ensemble has been described as combining elements of experimental and avant-garde music with influences from world music and modern classical traditions, alongside jazz and rock.
Reviews noted the ensemble’s dense sound, with overlapping brass, strings, percussion, and vibraphone lines creating complex textures.
Other coverage emphasized the prominence of ringing overtones and a quieter, atmospheric side, relating the music to ambient or modern classical sensibilities rather than conventional jazz.

== Members ==
=== Core members ===
- Yasuhiro Yoshigaki - drums, percussion, vocals (leader)
- Yoichi Okabe - drums, percussion
- Yuji Katsui - violin, effects
- Keisuke Ohta - violin, voice
- Taisei Aoki - trombone, pianica, keyboards
- Osamu Matsumoto - trombone
- Hiroaki Mizutani - bass
- Kumiko Takara - vibraphone, marimba, percussion

=== Additional contributor ===
- Naruyoshi Kikuchi - saxophone on Vincent I

Several members were simultaneously active in other ensembles such as ROVO, Otomo Yoshihide's New Jazz Orchestra (ONJO), and Date Course Pentagon Royal Garden (DCPRG), which are therefore listed as associated acts.

== Discography ==
No.	Release date	Title	Track list	Personnel
1	21 November 2002	Vincent I	1. Nemurenu Yoru no Tameni (For Sleepless Nights); 2. Maqam Yegya; 3. Turkish Van; 4. While Smoking Ginger Cigarettes; 5. Barley Field with Cypress; 6. Dance of Barley (or Expo '70); 7. Uocho and the Hundertwasser House; 8. Green Claws; 9. Jungle Boogie; 10. Great Construction (Theme of Thunder Marathon); 11. Kino	Yasuhiro Yoshigaki (ds, perc, tp, vo) Taisei Aoki (tb, pianica, vo); Osamu Matsumoto (tb, vo); Naruyoshi Kikuchi (sax, vo); Yuji Katsui (vln, effects, vo); Keisuke Ohta (vln, Arabic vo); Hiroaki Mizutani (b, perc, vo); Yoichi Okabe (ds, perc); Kumiko Takara (vib, mar, perc)
2	10 September 2004	Vincent II	1. Katsuwamushi; 2. MBIR-VA; 3. Oferere / Azoth; 4. The Cat Goes into the Woods on a Moonlit Night; 5. ☆☆Moon – Clown's Requiem and Merry-Go-Round; 6. Re-Baptizum; 7. Rooftop Kite	Yasuhiro Yoshigaki (ds, perc) Taisei Aoki (tb, pianica, bamboo fl, org); Osamu Matsumoto (tb); Yuji Katsui (el.&ac.vln, effects); Keisuke Ohta (el.vln, Arabic vo); Hiroaki Mizutani (cb); Kumiko Takara (vib, mar, perc); Yoichi Okabe (ds, perc)
3	10 July 2005	Vincent III	1. Eatborfa; 2. Parade Part 1; 3. Parade Part 2; 4. Dancin’ in Your Head [D.V.B. ver.]; 5. Lester B 6. Dancin’ in Your Head [F.Z. ver.]; 7. Tanguy’s Dance; 8. Crimson Sky; 9. Cool Running; 10. Talking Drums; 11. Colombian March; 12. Kino 2	Yasuhiro Yoshigaki (ds, perc, vo) Taisei Aoki (tb, keys, vo); Osamu Matsumoto (tb, vo); Yuji Katsui (vln, vo); Keisuke Ohta (vln, vo); Hiroaki Mizutani (b, vo); Kumiko Takara (perc, vo); Yoichi Okabe (perc, ds, vo)

== Reception ==
Vincent II was noted for its distinctive sound, combining improvisational freedom with structural precision.
In 2017, Vincent I and Vincent III were reissued in paper-sleeve editions, demonstrating ongoing interest in the group.

== See also ==
- Yasuhiro Yoshigaki
- Rovo
