= Orquesta Libre =

Japanese large-ensemble project led by drummer Yasuhiro Yoshigaki

- Origin: Tokyo, Japan
- Years active: 2011–present
- Label: Glamorous Records

Orquesta Libre (Japanese: オルケスタ・リブレ) is a Japanese large-ensemble project led by drummer and composer Yasuhiro Yoshigaki. Active since 2011, the group reimagines standards from jazz, rock, film, and theater for a flexible “mini-orchestra,” often with guest vocalists and collaborators.

The ensemble released two debut studio albums simultaneously in July 2012—one a two-disc vocal set with singer-songwriters Yoichiro Yanagihara and Yuichi Ohata, and the other an instrumental collection—on Yoshigaki's Glamorous Records imprint. A European tour followed, including an appearance at the Copenhagen Jazz Festival, and the group played at Fuji Rock Festival '12.

In 2013–2014 Orquesta Libre issued the Ellington tribute Plays Duke featuring pianist Suga Dairo and tap dancer RON×II, which received coverage in English-language jazz media.

== History ==
=== Formation and concept ===
Orquesta Libre grew out of a 2011 curated concert at Shinjuku Pit Inn in Tokyo. Conceived by Yoshigaki as a flexible, song-centered orchestra, the band set out to “turn anything with a strong melody into a standard,” ranging from 1960s–70s rock and pop to Brecht/Weill and film music, re-arranged for winds, brass, vibraphone, guitar, and rhythm section, with occasional tap dance and guest vocals.

=== Early releases and European tour (2012) ===
On July 4, 2012, the group released two albums on Yoshigaki’s Glamorous Records: the two-disc vocal set Uta no Katachi (Uta No K-Ta-Chi)—with one disc featuring Yoichiro Yanagihara and the other Yuichi Ohata—and the instrumental Can’t Help Falling in Love. (Note: Some contemporary listings showed "Glamorous Records / ewe,” reflecting a co-listing at the time. Source: "Interview: Yasuhiro Yoshigaki". JJazz.Net (in Japanese). September 5, 2012. "レーベル：Glamrorous Records / ewe".) Following the releases, Orquesta Libre toured Europe in July 2012, including an appearance at the Copenhagen Jazz Festival, and later performed at Fuji Rock Festival '12.

=== Plays Duke and subsequent activities ===
The ensemble’s Ellington project with pianist Suga Dairo and tap dancer RON×II was documented on Plays Duke (2014) and received coverage in English-language jazz media.

== Musical style and collaborators ==
Critics describe Orquesta Libre as an “alternative wind-orchestra” that blurs jazz, rock, theatre, and film music, often juxtaposing Ellington with 1960s/70s pop and Brazilian repertoire. Core instrumentation has included saxophones, trumpet, trombone, tuba, vibraphone, guitar, bass, drums and percussion; collaborators have included pianist Suga Dairo, tap dancer RON×II, and vocalists Yoichiro Yanagihara and Yuichi Ohata.

== International performances ==
- Europe (2012): European tour in July 2012 including Copenhagen Jazz Festival; domestic appearance at Fuji Rock Festival '12 followed later that month.
- Europe (2016): A later Orquesta Libre Europe Tour (Yasuhiro Yoshigaki) received support in the Japan Foundation’s grant program listings (countries noted include Austria, Denmark and Germany, among others).

== Members ==
Line-ups vary by project. Yoshigaki leads on drums and percussion. Documented personnel on Plays Duke include: Yoshigaki Yasuhiro (drums), Taisei Aoki (trombone, keys, harmonica), Hiroyuki Shiotani (soprano sax, clarinet), Daisuke Fujiwara (tenor sax), Takao Watanabe (trumpet), Gideon Juckes (tuba), Kumiko Takara (vibraphone), Masato Suzuki (bass), Motomu Shiiya (guitar, steel guitar), Yoichi Okabe (percussion), plus guests Suga Dairo (piano) and Ron×II (tap).

== Discography ==
=== Uta no Katachi (UTA NO KA·TA·CHI) (2012) ===
Two-disc studio album released July 4, 2012 (EWGL-0013/14; Glamorous Records). “Red Disc” features Yoichiro Yanagihara; “Yellow Disc” features Yuichi Ohata. Issued the same day as the instrumental set Can't Help Falling in Love.

Red Disc — with Yoichiro Yanagihara (vocals)

No.	Title	Length	Personnel
1	Alabama Song	4:34	Orquesta Libre Yasuhiro Yoshigaki (drums, percussion, arrangements); Taisei Aoki (trombone, keyboards, key harmonica, arrangements); Hiroyuki Shiotani (soprano saxophone, clarinet); Daisuke Fujiwara (tenor saxophone); Takao Watanabe (trumpet); Gideon Juckes (tuba); Kumiko Takara (vibraphone, percussion); Masato Suzuki (bass, arrangements); Motomu Shiiya (guitar, steel guitar); Yoichi Okabe (percussion) Guest: Yoichiro Yanagihara (vocals)
2	Ballad of Sexual Dependency	5:35	Orquesta Libre Yasuhiro Yoshigaki (drums, percussion, arrangements); Taisei Aoki (trombone, keyboards, key harmonica, arrangements); Hiroyuki Shiotani (soprano saxophone, clarinet); Daisuke Fujiwara (tenor saxophone); Takao Watanabe (trumpet); Gideon Juckes (tuba); Kumiko Takara (vibraphone, percussion); Masato Suzuki (bass, arrangements); Motomu Shiiya (guitar, steel guitar); Yoichi Okabe (percussion) Guest: Yoichiro Yanagihara (vocals)
3	The Ballad of Mack the Knife – live ver.	6:18	Orquesta Libre Yasuhiro Yoshigaki (drums, percussion, arrangements); Taisei Aoki (trombone, keyboards, key harmonica, arrangements); Hiroyuki Shiotani (soprano saxophone, clarinet); Daisuke Fujiwara (tenor saxophone); Takao Watanabe (trumpet); Gideon Juckes (tuba); Kumiko Takara (vibraphone, percussion); Masato Suzuki (bass, arrangements); Motomu Shiiya (guitar, steel guitar); Yoichi Okabe (percussion) Guest: Yoichiro Yanagihara (vocals)
4	What Keeps Mankind Alive? – Finale of The Threepenny Opera	5:34	Orquesta Libre Yasuhiro Yoshigaki (drums, percussion, arrangements); Taisei Aoki (trombone, keyboards, key harmonica, arrangements); Hiroyuki Shiotani (soprano saxophone, clarinet); Daisuke Fujiwara (tenor saxophone); Takao Watanabe (trumpet); Gideon Juckes (tuba); Kumiko Takara (vibraphone, percussion); Masato Suzuki (bass, arrangements); Motomu Shiiya (guitar, steel guitar); Yoichi Okabe (percussion) Guest: Yoichiro Yanagihara (vocals)
5	Ev’ry Time We Say Goodbye	5:24	Orquesta Libre Yasuhiro Yoshigaki (drums, percussion, arrangements); Taisei Aoki (trombone, keyboards, key harmonica, arrangements); Hiroyuki Shiotani (soprano saxophone, clarinet); Daisuke Fujiwara (tenor saxophone); Takao Watanabe (trumpet); Gideon Juckes (tuba); Kumiko Takara (vibraphone, percussion); Masato Suzuki (bass, arrangements); Motomu Shiiya (guitar, steel guitar); Yoichi Okabe (percussion) Guest: Yoichiro Yanagihara (vocals)
6	Alfie	7:07	Orquesta Libre Yasuhiro Yoshigaki (drums, percussion, arrangements); Taisei Aoki (trombone, keyboards, key harmonica, arrangements); Hiroyuki Shiotani (soprano saxophone, clarinet); Daisuke Fujiwara (tenor saxophone); Takao Watanabe (trumpet); Gideon Juckes (tuba); Kumiko Takara (vibraphone, percussion); Masato Suzuki (bass, arrangements); Motomu Shiiya (guitar, steel guitar); Yoichi Okabe (percussion) Guest: Yoichiro Yanagihara (vocals)
7	Smile	3:32	Orquesta Libre Yasuhiro Yoshigaki (drums, percussion, arrangements); Taisei Aoki (trombone, keyboards, key harmonica, arrangements); Hiroyuki Shiotani (soprano saxophone, clarinet); Daisuke Fujiwara (tenor saxophone); Takao Watanabe (trumpet); Gideon Juckes (tuba); Kumiko Takara (vibraphone, percussion); Masato Suzuki (bass, arrangements); Motomu Shiiya (guitar, steel guitar); Yoichi Okabe (percussion) Guest: Yoichiro Yanagihara (vocals)
Sources: OTOTOY release page for timings and track order.

Yellow Disc — with Yuichi Ohata (vocals)

No.	Title	Length	Personnel
1	Cecilia	6:04	Orquesta Libre (same core lineup as above) Guest: Yuichi Ohata (vocals)
2	Have You Ever Smoked Gauloises?	6:07	Orquesta Libre (same core lineup as above) Guest: Yuichi Ohata (vocals)
3	Lili Marleen ~ the Blue March of Turkey	7:44	Orquesta Libre (same core lineup as above) Guest: Yuichi Ohata (vocals)
4	Les Champs-Élysées	5:05	Orquesta Libre (same core lineup as above) Guest: Yuichi Ohata (vocals)
5	Purple Haze	8:10	Orquesta Libre (same core lineup as above) Guest: Yuichi Ohata (vocals)
6	I Shall Be Released	7:28	Orquesta Libre (same core lineup as above) Guest: Yuichi Ohata (vocals)
Sources: OTOTOY release page for timings and track order.

=== Can't Help Falling in Love (2012) ===
Released July 4, 2012 (EWGL-0015, Glamorous Records).

No.	Title	Length	Personnel
1	Por Una Cabeza	5:10	Orquesta Libre Yasuhiro Yoshigaki (drums, percussion, arrangements); Yoichi Okabe (percussion); Masato Suzuki (bass, arrangements); Motomu Shiiya (guitar, steel guitar, mandolin, banjo); Kumiko Takara (vibraphone, percussion); Takao Watanabe (trumpet); Daisuke Fujiwara (tenor saxophone); Hiroyuki Shiotani (soprano saxophone, clarinet); Taisei Aoki (trombone, key harmonica, arrangements); Gideon Juckes (tuba)
2	Hush	4:09	Orquesta Libre Yasuhiro Yoshigaki (drums, percussion, arrangements); Yoichi Okabe (percussion); Masato Suzuki (bass, arrangements); Motomu Shiiya (guitar, steel guitar, mandolin, banjo); Kumiko Takara (vibraphone, percussion); Takao Watanabe (trumpet); Daisuke Fujiwara (tenor saxophone); Hiroyuki Shiotani (soprano saxophone, clarinet); Taisei Aoki (trombone, key harmonica, arrangements); Gideon Juckes (tuba)
3	Purple Haze	8:51	Orquesta Libre Yasuhiro Yoshigaki (drums, percussion, arrangements); Yoichi Okabe (percussion); Masato Suzuki (bass, arrangements); Motomu Shiiya (guitar, steel guitar, mandolin, banjo); Kumiko Takara (vibraphone, percussion); Takao Watanabe (trumpet); Daisuke Fujiwara (tenor saxophone); Hiroyuki Shiotani (soprano saxophone, clarinet); Taisei Aoki (trombone, key harmonica, arrangements); Gideon Juckes (tuba)
4	I Say a Little Prayer	5:29	Orquesta Libre Yasuhiro Yoshigaki (drums, percussion, arrangements); Yoichi Okabe (percussion); Masato Suzuki (bass, arrangements); Motomu Shiiya (guitar, steel guitar, mandolin, banjo); Kumiko Takara (vibraphone, percussion); Takao Watanabe (trumpet); Daisuke Fujiwara (tenor saxophone); Hiroyuki Shiotani (soprano saxophone, clarinet); Taisei Aoki (trombone, key harmonica, arrangements); Gideon Juckes (tuba)
5	(They Long to Be) Close to You	8:14	Orquesta Libre Yasuhiro Yoshigaki (drums, percussion, arrangements); Yoichi Okabe (percussion); Masato Suzuki (bass, arrangements); Motomu Shiiya (guitar, steel guitar, mandolin, banjo); Kumiko Takara (vibraphone, percussion); Takao Watanabe (trumpet); Daisuke Fujiwara (tenor saxophone); Hiroyuki Shiotani (soprano saxophone, clarinet); Taisei Aoki (trombone, key harmonica, arrangements); Gideon Juckes (tuba)
6	Hello, Dolly!	7:40	Orquesta Libre Yasuhiro Yoshigaki (drums, percussion, arrangements); Yoichi Okabe (percussion); Masato Suzuki (bass, arrangements); Motomu Shiiya (guitar, steel guitar, mandolin, banjo); Kumiko Takara (vibraphone, percussion); Takao Watanabe (trumpet); Daisuke Fujiwara (tenor saxophone); Hiroyuki Shiotani (soprano saxophone, clarinet); Taisei Aoki (trombone, key harmonica, arrangements); Gideon Juckes (tuba)
7	Le Clan des Siciliens	5:35	Orquesta Libre Yasuhiro Yoshigaki (drums, percussion, arrangements); Yoichi Okabe (percussion); Masato Suzuki (bass, arrangements); Motomu Shiiya (guitar, steel guitar, mandolin, banjo); Kumiko Takara (vibraphone, percussion); Takao Watanabe (trumpet); Daisuke Fujiwara (tenor saxophone); Hiroyuki Shiotani (soprano saxophone, clarinet); Taisei Aoki (trombone, key harmonica, arrangements); Gideon Juckes (tuba)
8	Ponta de Areia	6:22	Orquesta Libre Yasuhiro Yoshigaki (drums, percussion, arrangements); Yoichi Okabe (percussion); Masato Suzuki (bass, arrangements); Motomu Shiiya (guitar, steel guitar, mandolin, banjo); Kumiko Takara (vibraphone, percussion); Takao Watanabe (trumpet); Daisuke Fujiwara (tenor saxophone); Hiroyuki Shiotani (soprano saxophone, clarinet); Taisei Aoki (trombone, key harmonica, arrangements); Gideon Juckes (tuba)
9	Can’t Help Falling in Love	11:34	Orquesta Libre Yasuhiro Yoshigaki (drums, percussion, arrangements); Yoichi Okabe (percussion); Masato Suzuki (bass, arrangements); Motomu Shiiya (guitar, steel guitar, mandolin, banjo); Kumiko Takara (vibraphone, percussion); Takao Watanabe (trumpet); Daisuke Fujiwara (tenor saxophone); Hiroyuki Shiotani (soprano saxophone, clarinet); Taisei Aoki (trombone, key harmonica, arrangements); Gideon Juckes (tuba)
Sources: package materials (obi/insert) for credits and lineup; track timings from OTOTOY release page.

=== Plays Duke (2014) ===
CD released March 14, 2014 (GLAM-0002); LP released August 28, 2014 (GLAM0003LP).

No.	Title	Length	Personnel
1	Take the "A" Train	7:39	Orquesta Libre Yasuhiro Yoshigaki (drums, percussion); Taisei Aoki (trombone, keyboards, key harmonica); Hiroyuki Shiotani (soprano saxophone, clarinet); Daisuke Fujiwara (tenor saxophone); Takao Watanabe (trumpet); Gideon Juckes (tuba); Kumiko Takara (vibraphone); Masato Suzuki (bass); Motomu Shiiya (guitar, steel guitar); Yoichi Okabe (percussion) Guests: Suga Dairo (piano), RON×II (tap)
2	Caravan	8:16	Orquesta Libre Yasuhiro Yoshigaki (drums, percussion); Taisei Aoki (trombone, keyboards, key harmonica); Hiroyuki Shiotani (soprano saxophone, clarinet); Daisuke Fujiwara (tenor saxophone); Takao Watanabe (trumpet); Gideon Juckes (tuba); Kumiko Takara (vibraphone); Masato Suzuki (bass); Motomu Shiiya (guitar, steel guitar); Yoichi Okabe (percussion) Guests: Suga Dairo (piano), RON×II (tap)
3	Creole Love Call	8:16	Orquesta Libre Yasuhiro Yoshigaki (drums, percussion); Taisei Aoki (trombone, keyboards, key harmonica); Hiroyuki Shiotani (soprano saxophone, clarinet); Daisuke Fujiwara (tenor saxophone); Takao Watanabe (trumpet); Gideon Juckes (tuba); Kumiko Takara (vibraphone); Masato Suzuki (bass); Motomu Shiiya (guitar, steel guitar); Yoichi Okabe (percussion) Guests: Suga Dairo (piano), RON×II (tap)
4	I Got It Bad (And That Ain’t Good)	9:06	Orquesta Libre Yasuhiro Yoshigaki (drums, percussion); Taisei Aoki (trombone, keyboards, key harmonica); Hiroyuki Shiotani (soprano saxophone, clarinet); Daisuke Fujiwara (tenor saxophone); Takao Watanabe (trumpet); Gideon Juckes (tuba); Kumiko Takara (vibraphone); Masato Suzuki (bass); Motomu Shiiya (guitar, steel guitar); Yoichi Okabe (percussion) Guests: Suga Dairo (piano), RON×II (tap)
5	African Flower (Petite Fleur Africaine)	10:20	Orquesta Libre Yasuhiro Yoshigaki (drums, percussion); Taisei Aoki (trombone, keyboards, key harmonica); Hiroyuki Shiotani (soprano saxophone, clarinet); Daisuke Fujiwara (tenor saxophone); Takao Watanabe (trumpet); Gideon Juckes (tuba); Kumiko Takara (vibraphone); Masato Suzuki (bass); Motomu Shiiya (guitar, steel guitar); Yoichi Okabe (percussion) Guests: Suga Dairo (piano), RON×II (tap)
6	Money Jungle (listed as “Money Jangle”)	4:55	Orquesta Libre Yasuhiro Yoshigaki (drums, percussion); Taisei Aoki (trombone, keyboards, key harmonica); Hiroyuki Shiotani (soprano saxophone, clarinet); Daisuke Fujiwara (tenor saxophone); Takao Watanabe (trumpet); Gideon Juckes (tuba); Kumiko Takara (vibraphone); Masato Suzuki (bass); Motomu Shiiya (guitar, steel guitar); Yoichi Okabe (percussion) Guests: Suga Dairo (piano), RON×II (tap)
7	The Mooche	10:47	Orquesta Libre Yasuhiro Yoshigaki (drums, percussion); Taisei Aoki (trombone, keyboards, key harmonica); Hiroyuki Shiotani (soprano saxophone, clarinet); Daisuke Fujiwara (tenor saxophone); Takao Watanabe (trumpet); Gideon Juckes (tuba); Kumiko Takara (vibraphone); Masato Suzuki (bass); Motomu Shiiya (guitar, steel guitar); Yoichi Okabe (percussion) Guests: Suga Dairo (piano), RON×II (tap)
8	Rockin’ in Rhythm	5:34	Orquesta Libre Yasuhiro Yoshigaki (drums, percussion); Taisei Aoki (trombone, keyboards, key harmonica); Hiroyuki Shiotani (soprano saxophone, clarinet); Daisuke Fujiwara (tenor saxophone); Takao Watanabe (trumpet); Gideon Juckes (tuba); Kumiko Takara (vibraphone); Masato Suzuki (bass); Motomu Shiiya (guitar, steel guitar); Yoichi Okabe (percussion) Guests: Suga Dairo (piano), RON×II (tap)
9	Mood Indigo	9:27	Orquesta Libre Yasuhiro Yoshigaki (drums, percussion); Taisei Aoki (trombone, keyboards, key harmonica); Hiroyuki Shiotani (soprano saxophone, clarinet); Daisuke Fujiwara (tenor saxophone); Takao Watanabe (trumpet); Gideon Juckes (tuba); Kumiko Takara (vibraphone); Masato Suzuki (bass); Motomu Shiiya (guitar, steel guitar); Yoichi Okabe (percussion) Guests: Suga Dairo (piano), RON×II (tap)
Sources: track list/coverage (All About Jazz); release details (CD/LP); timings from package/download metadata (to be replaced with liner citation if available).

=== Rock Opera! (2016) ===
With Rolly. CD released March 23, 2016 (CDSOL-1724); LP released June 7, 2017 (SOLID-1021); CD reissue July 3, 2024 (UVPR-60028).

== Notable performances ==
- Copenhagen Jazz Festival (2012, Europe tour) – invitation referenced in artist interview.
- Fuji Rock Festival '12 (2012).

== Reception ==
English-language jazz press highlighted the ensemble’s unconventional orchestration and energetic re-arrangements on Plays Duke. Reviewer Eyal Hareuveni noted the way Yoshigaki’s unit “re-imagines Ellington” with added colors such as tuba, vibraphone and tap.

== See also ==
- Yasuhiro Yoshigaki
- Vincent Atmicus
