= A Shape of Light =

2016 soundtrack album by kensuke ushio

Soundtrack album by Kensuke Ushio
- Released: September 14, 2016
- Recorded: 2016
- Studios: Maruni (Tokyo, Japan); Kimken (Nasu, Tokyo, Japan)
- Length: 119:20
- Label: Pony Canyon
- Producers: Kensuke Ushio; Shinichi Nakamura

Kensuke Ushio chronology
Ping Pong (2014)	A Shape of Light (2016)	Liz and the Blue Bird (2018)

Alternative cover
- The vinyl version [Shape B]

A Shape of Light (short for A Silent Voice Original Soundtrack: A Shape of Light; stylised in all lowercase) is a soundtrack album by Japanese EBM musician and composer Kensuke Ushio, which serves as the official film soundtrack for Japanese animated film A Silent Voice.

The soundtrack contains 61 tracks on two CDs and has a running-time of about two hours. It was released on September 14, 2016, by Pony Canyon. A western release was done in 2017 by Anime Limited in English-speaking countries and Europe. The vinyl version is known as Shape B and has the same track listing but with a different cover.

A Shape of Light peaked at no. 74 on the Japanese Albums Chart where it lasted for about five weeks in the rankings.

== Production history ==
Kensuke Ushio was announced as the soundtrack's composer in May 2016, after being asked to write the music for Kyoto Animation's anime movie A Silent Voice in 2015.

Most of the tracks were composed by Ushio himself while all tracks titled inv are based on the Invention No. 1 in C major, BWV 772 originally composed by Johann Sebastian Bach. Ushio worked alongside movie director Naoko Yamada which had a very similar point of view when it came across the concept of the film and music. Kensuke Ushio described the movie as Shōya's story that deals about his contacts with other people and how treats them, which was a universal theme when it came to bring it out of context. For working on the film's music Ushio was shown several scenarios. He stated that he put full effort in the recordings of the sounds.

The movie soundtrack was recorded at the Maruni Studio in Tokyo, Japan. The track slt featured guest violinist Yuji Katsui from Rovo. The mixing of the first disc was done by Hiroshi Kitashiro, while Ushio mixed the second CD himself. The mastering was done at Kimken Studio, Nasu, Tokyo, Japan.

In an interview Ushio stated he had not really worked on film scores that often before working on A Silent Voice's soundtrack. Yamada, who was familiar with Ushio's music, contacted his management requesting his involvement in composing the soundtrack. The work on the film's score began when most parts of the storyboard had to be elaborated. The studio works ended when sound director Yuta Tsuruoka got the final musical concept and approved it.

== Background ==
Ushio composed a total of 82 tracks for the soundtrack. 61 tracks were selected for the soundtrack, while only 50 were actually used in the film. The majority of the songs are composed for piano.

The tracks' titles on the first CD consist of three letters, with exceptions of the inv titles, van(var), lvs(var) and lit(var). The three -letter titles are identification codes created by Ushio himself while composing the titles and which he got feedback for. Ushio decided that he would use his identification codes as song names instead of renaming them in order to tell the listener their possible meanings. Instead he wanted the listeners to come up with their own interpretations.

The identification codes are not arbitrary. htb on the first CD stands for heart beat, which is the first track on the second CD and another version of that track. Ushio describes the inv tracks as the most important songs on the soundtrack. He stated that Bach's Invention is splitable in three parts as well as the movie's plot why every part got some inv tracks on it.

Regarding the movie, the inv title and their adaptions are an example of learning how to communicate and how Shōya made it throughout the movie to overcome his guilt in Elementary School and how he invented a new way of communication. During the final scene in the movie where Shōya and Shōko are seen visiting the Highschool's culture festival, the final part of Bach's Invention is played, symbolising the end of Shōya's lesson in communication.

lit, which is only played two times throughout the whole movie, stands for Light. Ushio stated the movie is about reaching the light, which is why the songs were played at the very end of the film.

== Critical reception ==
James Marsh of South China Morning Post wrote that the discordant sounding score by Ushio lays an unsettling layer on the complex sounding landscape of the film which brings the viewer nearer to Shōko Nishimiyas world's view. In a movie review at Anime News Network Kevin Cirugeda wrote that Kensuke Ushio and Naoko Yamada worked closely together on the soundtrack resulting – excluding the licensed "My Generation" by The Who – in gentle piano sounds, ambient sounds and pure silence. There are no significant tracks instead the films as whole was described as a sensory experience where the sounds play as such of a role like the background music used in the movie.

Readers of Anime UK News voted the soundtrack as Best Soundtrack at the Anime UK Reader's Choice Awards alongside the musical score of The Ancient Magus' Bride.

== Commercial performance ==
The soundtrack peaked at no. 74 in the Japanese Albums Chart in the week of September 14, 2016, staying on the chart for five weeks.

== Track listing ==
All music composed/produced by Kensuke Ushio. All inv tracks are based on Invention No. 1 in C major, BWV 772 originally composed by Johann Sebastian Bach.

a shape of light – disc 1
No.	Title	Length
1.	"tre"	1:48
2.	"inv(I.i)"	1:23
3.	"roh"	1:46
4.	"lvs"	2:06
5.	"inv(I.ii)"	1:12
6.	"rev"	1:34
7.	"inv(I.iii)"	1:19
8.	"lvs(var)"	1:26
9.	"thn"	0:49
10.	"lit"	0:51
11.	"bnw"	0:50
12.	"htb"	1:02
13.	"bll"	1:02
14.	"acc"	1:38
15.	"int"	1:21
16.	"flw"	1:36
17.	"mon"	0:58
18.	"maw"	1:06
19.	"inv(II.i)"	1:03
20.	"van"	2:25
21.	"inv(II.ii)"	0:46
22.	"inv(II.iii)"	1:02
23.	"sig"	1:30
24.	"aft"	2:18
25.	"inv(II.iv)"	0:53
26.	"flt"	1:40
27.	"prc"	2:24
28.	"pst"	2:09
29.	"inv(II.v)"	3:22
30.	"btf"	1:05
31.	"van(var)"	1:32
32.	"sus"	2:13
33.	"frc"	1:31
34.	"inv(II.vi)"	1:32
35.	"qut"	1:52
36.	"svg"	2:02
37.	"slt (Note: violin by Yuji Katsui from Rovo)"	1:59
38.	"Invention No.1 C dur (LastPart)"	1:28
39.	"lit(var)"	2:15
Total length:		60:48

a shape of light – disc 2
No.	Title	Length
1.	"heart beat"	1:39
2.	"round"	1:38
3.	"into the sparkle"	3:25
4.	"black and white"	2:44
5.	"(i can) say nothing (Note: lyrics by Ushio, mixed by Takahiro Namekawa)"	2:23
6.	"night lights"	1:36
7.	"blue blur"	1:36
8.	"vignette"	2:33
9.	"narrow road"	3:54
10.	"welcome to the park"	0:58
11.	"is your hair real?"	1:55
12.	"laser"	4:43
13.	"macchina eko"	1:41
14.	"green"	2:39
15.	"sunlight"	3:24
16.	"sketch no.19"	1:45
17.	"sustain"	2:08
18.	"no one here"	3:37
19.	"your silent portrait"	1:28
20.	"fractal"	5:45
21.	"flare"	2:18
22.	"speed of youth"	4:43
Total length:		119:20

A later release titled Inner Silence (short for A Silent Voice Original Soundtrack 2: Inner Silence; stylised in all lowercase) was released on May 17, 2017.

inner silence – disc 1
No.	Title	Length
1.	"inner silence part.i"	54:52
Total length:		54:52

inner silence – disc 2
No.	Title	Length
1.	"inner silence part.ii"	49:01
2.	"inner silence part.iii"	18:00
3.	"inner silence part.iv"	10:48
Total length:		132:41

== Release history ==
Region	Date	Format	Label	Version
Japan	September 14, 2016	CD; digital download; streaming	Pony Canyon	Shape A
Japan	September 14, 2016	Vinyl	Pony Canyon	Shape B
Japan	May 17, 2017	CD	Pony Canyon	inner silence
Various	November 25, 2019	Vinyl	All The Anime Music	N/A
Various	November 16, 2020	CD	All The Anime Music	N/A
