= Soup Live =

Live album by Otomo Yoshihide/ Bill Laswell/Yasuhiro Yoshigaki
- Released: September 20, 2004
- Recorded: December 14 and 15, 2003 at Shinjuku Pit Inn, Tokyo, Japan
- Genre: Free improv, psychedelic rock
- Length: 129:24
- Label: P-Vine
- Producer: Shin Terai

Bill Laswell chronology
Brutal Calling (2004)	Soup Live (2004)	Version 2 Version: A Dub Transmission (2004)

Soup Live is a collaborative album by Bill Laswell, Yasuhiro Yoshigaki and Otomo Yoshihide. It was released on September 20, 2004 by P-Vine Records.

== Track listing ==
All music is composed by Bill Laswell, Yasuhiro Yoshigaki and Otomo Yoshihide.

Disc one
No.	Title	Length
1.	"Chikin"	17:13
2.	"Corn"	20:11
3.	"Onion"	10:13
4.	"Eel"	23:18

Disc two
No.	Title	Length
1.	"Pea"	15:31
2.	"Clam"	19:36
3.	"Truffe"	23:22

== Personnel ==
Adapted from the Soup Live liner notes.

Musicians

- Yuji Katsui – electric violin
- Naruyoshi Kikuchi – organ, tenor saxophone
- Bill Laswell – bass guitar, sampler, effects
- Akira Sakata – alto saxophone
- Yasuhiro Yoshigaki – drums, percussion, electronic drums, trumpet
- Otomo Yoshihide – guitar, effects

Technical personnel

- James Dellatacoma – assistant engineer
- Michael Fossenkemper – mastering
- Robert Musso – engineering
- Shin Terai – producer

== Release history ==
Region	Date	Label	Format	Catalog
Japan	2004	P-Vine	CD	PCD-18509/10
United States	2007	ION	CD	Ion 2023
