= Ground Zero (band) =

Japanese noise/improvisation band

- Origin: Tokyo, Japan
- Genres: Noise rock; experimental rock; jazz rock
- Years active: 1990–1998
- Labels: Alcohol; Amoebic; Creativeman; DIW; Doubtmusic; Gentle Giant; God Mountain; Les Disques Du Soleil Et De L'Acier; Nani; Pandemonium; Recommended; Sank-Ohso; Trigram; Tzadik
- Past members: Shuichi Chino; Junji Hirose; Hideki Kato; Naruyoshi Kikuchi; Sachiko Matsubara; Mitsuru Nasuno; Otomo Yoshihide; Yumiko Tanaka; Kazuhisa Uchihashi; Masahiro Uemura; Yasuhiro Yoshigaki

Ground-Zero was a Japanese noise rock band during the 1990s led by the guitarist and "turntablist" Otomo Yoshihide that had a large and rotating group of performers with two other regular performers.

== History ==
Ground-Zero was formed to play John Zorn's game piece Cobra. They first played in August 1990 and last played in March 1998. The band's last live project was in 1998 when they re-worked material from a 1992 Cassiber concert in Tokyo; it was released on the second CD of Cassiber's double CD, Live in Tokyo (1998). Their final album Last Concert was recorded live on March 8, 1998, and released in May the following year.

== Musical style ==
The band performed on such instruments as turntables, sampler, shamisen, saxophone, koto, omnichord, electric guitar and two drum kits. They were one of the first free improvising musicians using turntables.

Their music mixed free jazz, improvisation, rock and experimental noise. Their albums include Revolutionary Pekinese Opera Ver. 1.28, a sound collage piece combining noise music and samples of peking opera by the Duo Goebbels/Harth, and Consume Red, on which the performers improvise around a short sample of hojok music played by the Korean holy musician Kim Seok Chul. The album Consume Red was sampled on the song "All Hail" from the 2024 album Attempted Martyr by the noise rock band Prostitute.

== Discography ==
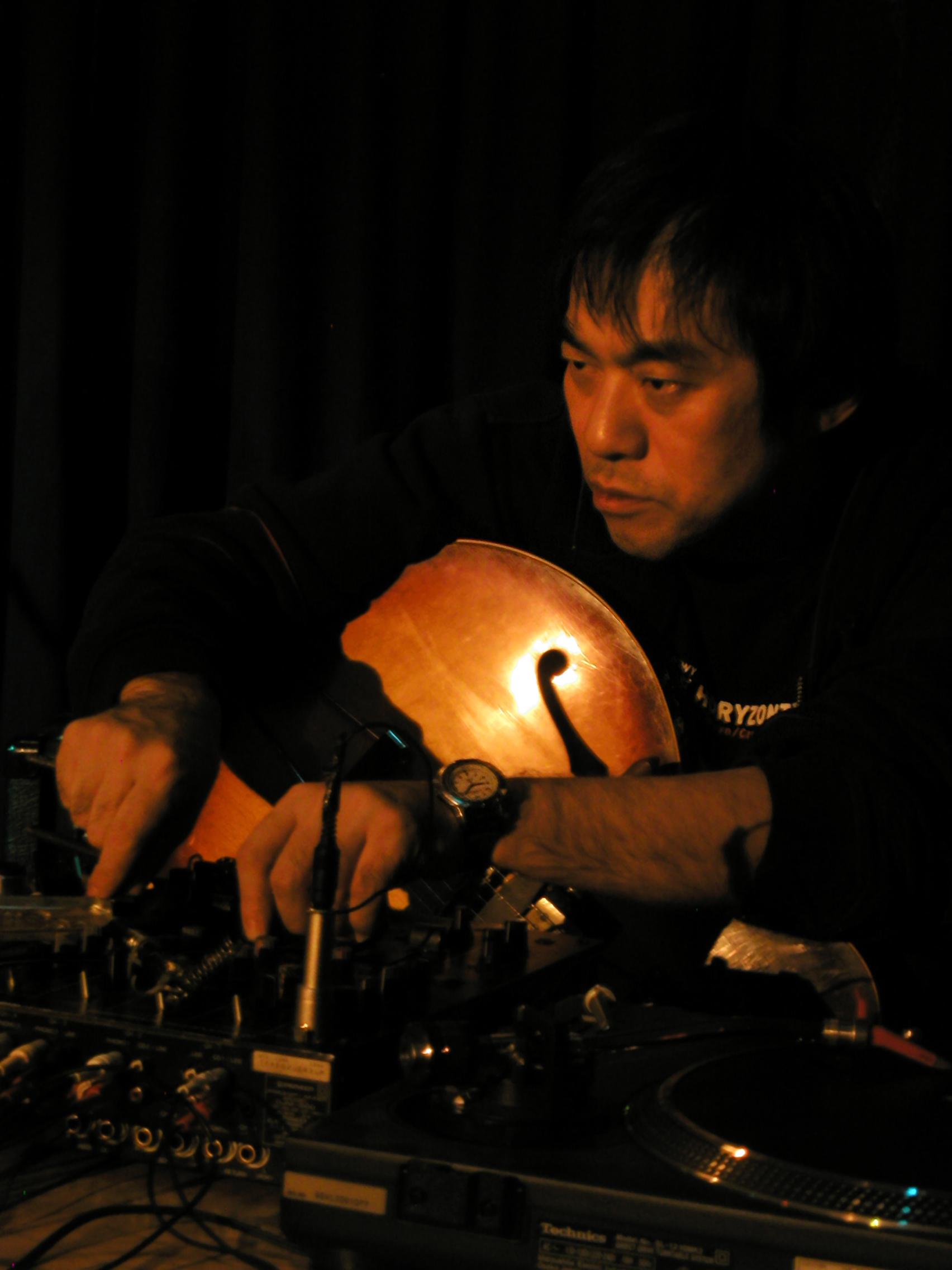
Otomo Yoshihide performing live at Weikersheim, Germany in 2007

=== Studio albums ===
- Ground Zero (1992)
- Null & Void (1995)
- Revolutionary Pekinese Opera (1995)
- Revolutionary Pekinese Opera Ver. 1.28 (1996)
- Consume Red (1997)
- Plays Standards (1997)

=== Compilation albums ===
- Conflagration (1997)
- Consummation (1998)

=== Live albums ===
- Last Concert (1999)
- Live 1992+ (2007)

=== Singles ===
- "Live Mao '99" (1995) (split with Bästard)
- "Revolutionary Pekinese Opera Ver. 1.50" (1996)
