= Kim Seok-chul =

Korean musician

Kim Seok-chul (김석출, 28 February 1922 – 26 July 2005) was a South Korean shaman in byeolsin-gut (별신굿, shaman ritual in the east coast of Korea) troop and hojok virtuoso (호적산조), recognized as the 82nd valuable intangible cultural asset of the Republic of Korea for his mastery of the instrument. Kim was born in 1922 at Pohang city, Kyungsangbuk-do. He was the great shaman, musician and composer of Korean traditional music. Outside of South Korea, he was primarily known for an audio snippet of his hojok playing, which was used in the experimental sound collage album Consume Red by Ground Zero (band).
