= Ishinha =

Osaka-based Japanese theatre group

Ishinha (維新派) is an Osaka-based Japanese theatre company. Its name means revolutionaries or reformers, from ishin (revolution, 維新) and ha (school or group, 派).

== History ==
The company was founded in 1970 by Yukichi Matsumoto. Over the years it has grown to be a very ambitious troupe employing over thirty performers and many other staff members. They now perform at large venues and on purpose-built outdoor stages. The company has toured to Australia, Germany and to Brazil, as well as to many places in Japan. Many of their productions have been filmed and are available on DVD and VHS.

The company has gone through more than one incarnation. Originally it was called Nihon Gekidan Ishinha, before becoming just Ishinha in 1987 as it began its now archetypal large-scale outdoor performances. It was from the mid-Nineties that the company developed productions in the style it calls Jan-Jan Opera. Matsumoto has said that 'there is more of an entertainment aspect' to the productions now and that they are more professionally managed.

== Style ==
Many of Ishinha's productions are performed in Kansaiben (Kansai dialect), although in fact there is usually very little dialogue. The dialogue is used in a rhythmic way, as much musical sounds as words. Matsumoto has said that 'the lines in my scripts are often strings of metallic and material nouns.'

An Australian critic wrote:

The theatre convention of dialogue also takes on a new meaning with Ishinha. The company borrows a little from traditional Kabuki theatre, in which lines are divided between performers (warizerifu), and staccato words delivered in a sing-song fashion. But Matsumoto pares back even further; single nouns are repeated and tossed, like balls, between performers. He's dubbed his own style of theatre "Jan Jan Opera", jan jan being an onomatopoeic term akin to crashbang.

As opposed to typical script-based realist theatre, Yukichi Matsumoto's outlook has been influenced by his art studies at university of Surrealist painters like Dali. The performers wear white make-up like clowns. The productions usually employ large casts, who perform in synchronized ensemble choreography. One critic described this as sounding like 'a rap musical'.

As can be seen in the mime-like and physical quality of their productions, dance is a strong element in an Ishinha production. The director has stated that the first thing he rehearses with the performers is body work and movement, even before the script has been written. However, there is no formal choreographer in the company. A journalist has written that:

the troupe’s goal is neither to illustrate a story in a standard theatrical manner, nor to demonstrate the physical dexterity of a dance performance. Rather, Ishinha seeks to show audiences a bird eye's view of a fictional (or vanished) urban cityscape through large-scale, realistic stage designs that recreate entire townships.

Ishinha's plays often tell epic stories. It has created a trilogy of works since 2007 on the theme of travel, including refugees and Japanese immigrants in South America and Eastern Europe.

Key concepts in Ishinha's oeuvre and imagery are roji (alley) and haikyo (ruins). Matsumoto has said that, 'A “home” is something where there is a creator and an owner, but alley and ruins have neither creators nor owners...A city without scars is not a very interesting place.'

== Works ==
This is a selective list. A full record is available on the Ishinha Japanese website.

Production	Year	Place performed
Rojishiki (ろじ式)	2009	Tokyo, Osaka
Kokyukikai (呼吸機械)	2008	Shiga
Nostalgia	2007-8	Osaka, Saitama, Kyoto, Perth, Auckland
Natsunotobira (ナツノトビラ)	2006	Osaka, Mexico, Brazil
Keaton (キートン)	2004	Osaka
Nocturne (ノクターン―)	2001	Tokyo
Mizumachi (水街)	1999–2000	Osaka, Adelaide
Oukoku (王國)	1998	Osaka
Aozora (青空)	1994-5	Osaka, Tokyo
Shonengai (少年街)	1991	Tokyo

== Staff ==
People associated with Ishinha include:

- Yukichi Matsumoto (director)
- Kazuhisa Uchihashi (musical director)
- Michiko Aoki (international producer)
- Azuma Gaku (publicity art)
- Takeshi Kuroda (art design)

== Awards ==
- Artist Award (Asahi Performing Arts Award 2008)
- Director's Prize (Yomiuri Engeki Taisho 2005)
- Asahi Performing Arts Award 2002

For complete list, see the Ishinha website.
