= Sights (Japanese band) =

Japanese free jazz band

- Origin: Kyoto, Japan
- Genres: Free jazz, improvisational music
- Years active: 1990–c.2000s

Sights (stylized as SIGHTS) was a Japanese improvisational jazz trio formed in Kyoto in 1990, featuring trombonist Yutaka Ohara, bassist Hiroshi Funato and drummer Yasuhiro Yoshigaki. They were a prominent force in the 1990s Kansai free improvisation scene, noted for their energetic live performances and eclectic musical style.

== History ==
The group emerged from Kyoto's vibrant underground jazz and performance spaces. According to Jazz Critique No. 86 (1996), they played regularly in venues such as Minoya Hall and Kobe's Big Apple, blending improvisation with theatrical flair to create a sound that was “joyful, powerful and intense.”

According to contributor Hiroshi Funato in Jazz Critique No. 89 (1996), Sights stood out within the Kyoto scene for their adventurous spirit and the trio's deep musical rapport. They offered a live experience that was both approachable and challenging—reminiscent of a communal musical conversation, not just a performance.

A live review by Toyoki Okajima in the same issue described their sound as “like a marching brass band passing through the venue,” despite the trio format.

== Musical style ==
The band's music drew on a mixture of influences—marching band rhythms, calypso, Afro-Caribbean, swing and Latin grooves—woven into dense, vibrant trio improvisations. Ohara cited salsa and Afro-Cuban traditions as early inspirations, Funato brought African and European elements, and Yoshigaki contributed rhythmic flexibility and intensity.

== Reception ==
Contemporary reviews in Jazz Critique praised Sights for their unique sound and their role in energizing the Kansai jazz scene of the 1990s. Their live performances were remembered as communal and exuberant—like a living, breathing musical dialogue rather than a structured solo show.

== Discography ==
This discography is based on listings in Jazz Critique and Japanese archival sources.

=== El Sur ===
Sur Music OYO-1, cassette, 1990

=== First Sight ===
Recording: April–May 1992, Sound Inn CAT (Shin-Osaka CAT Music School studio)
Release: August 15, 1992, DNA ACT-1 (CD, ¥2,718)

No.	Title	Duration	Composer
1	Fall To Funk	2:32	Yutaka Ohara
2	El Sur	6:19	Yutaka Ohara
3	Africa Suites Part1 / Part2	9:55	Yutaka Ohara
4	Dexpso	4:31	Yutaka Ohara
5	O-Yo	4:40	Yutaka Ohara
6	Days	6:49	Yutaka Ohara
7	Tarara ~ Matsuri	6:07	Yutaka Ohara
8	Insects’ House	2:29	Yutaka Ohara

=== Pink: Live at Big Apple ===
Sur Music OYO-2, cassette, 1994

=== Tatta ===
Recording: January 1995
Release: September 25, 1995, Voice From All Access VAA-001 (CD, ¥2,884)

No.	Title	Composer
1	Jump Up!	Yutaka Ohara
2	Barcelona	Yutaka Ohara
3	Shuffle	Yutaka Ohara
4	Ojara	Yutaka Ohara
5	Meu Voz	Yutaka Ohara
6	Tatta	Yutaka Ohara
7	?	Yutaka Ohara
8	Adam	Yutaka Ohara
9	Pink	Yutaka Ohara
10	Results	Yutaka Ohara
11	Insects House	Yutaka Ohara
12	Far a Way	Yutaka Ohara

=== El Sur ===
OFF NOTE reissue, CD, 2001

No.	Title
1	Tarara ~ Matsuri
2	Days
3	Choto
4	One Morning ~ Cafe Naniwa
5	Sur
6	Insect House
