= Kazuhisa Uchihashi =

Japanese guitarist, musician and composer

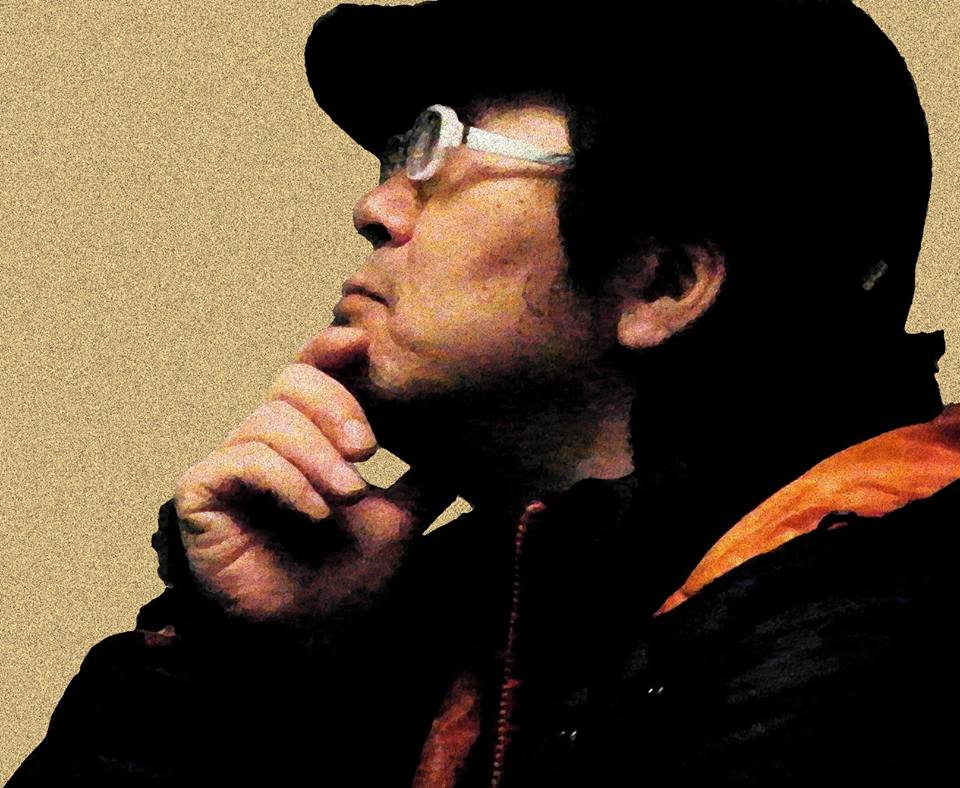
Kazuhisa Uchihashi (2011)

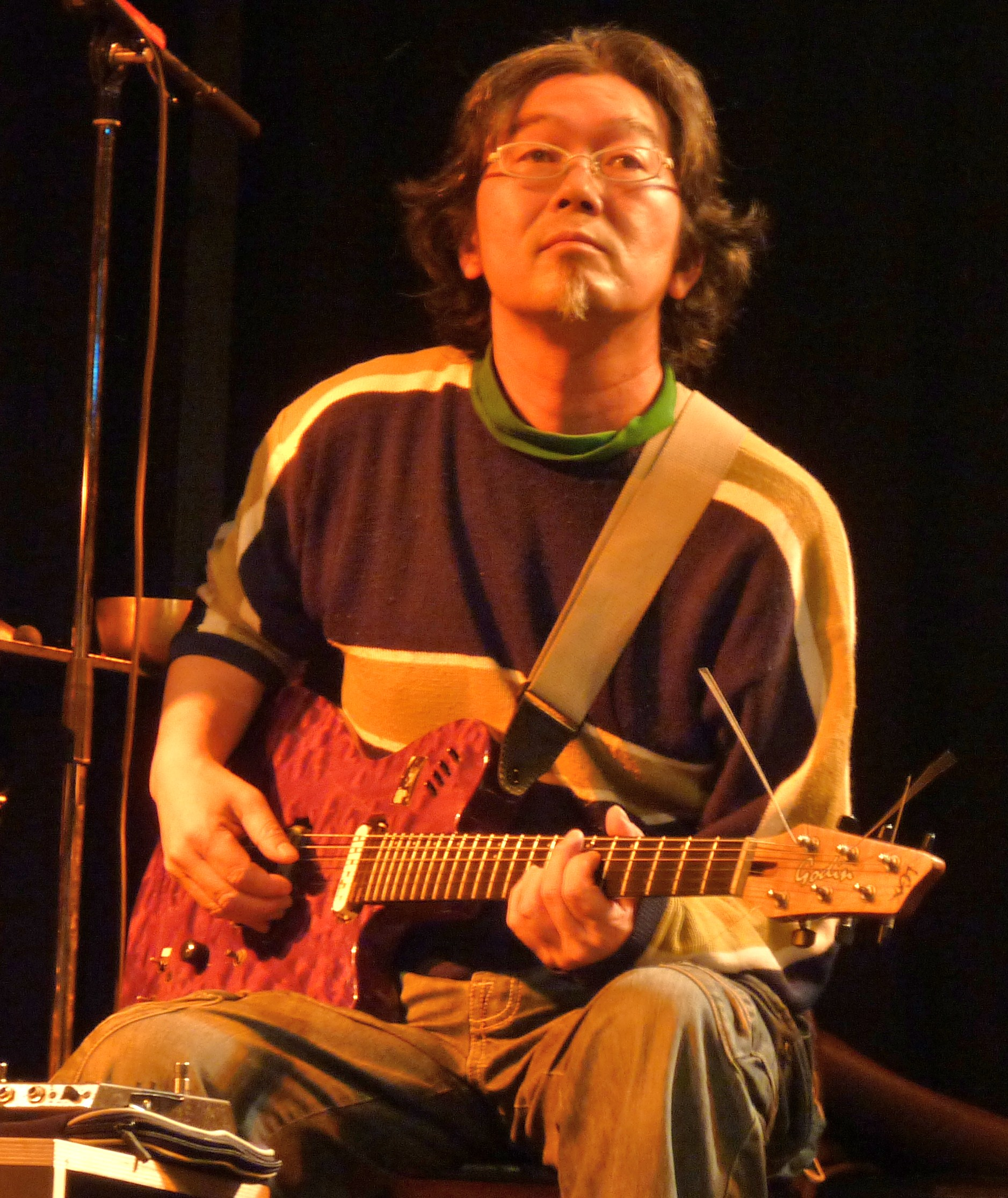
Kazuhisa Uchihashi (2009)

Kazuhisa Uchihashi (内橋和久, Uchihashi Kazuhisa) is a Japanese guitarist involved in free improvisation music. Born in 1959 in Osaka, Uchihashi began to play the guitar at age 12, playing in various rock bands, though he later studied jazz music. In 1988 he joined the band the First Edition, and in 1990 formed the band Altered States. He was also a member of Otomo Yoshihide's Ground Zero from 1994 to 1997. Uchihashi also plays daxophone, and in addition to his role as a free improviser, Uchihashi has been the musical director for Osaka theatre group Ishinha, has held improvisation workshops (a project known as New Music Action) in various cities in Japan, as well as London, Oslo, and currently in Vienna also. Uchihashi has set up his own record label, Innocent Records a.k.a. Zenbei Records, had held a music festival annually since 1996 Festival BEYOND INNOCENCE.
