= Aftermathematics =

Studio album by Bill Laswell and Grand Mixer DXT
- Released: December 5, 2003
- Recorded: Orange Music, West Orange, NJ
- Genre: Illbient, dub
- Length: 55:37
- Label: Sub Rosa
- Producer: Bill Laswell

Bill Laswell chronology
Buck Jam Tonic (2003)	Aftermathematics (2003)	Soup (2003)

Aftermathematics (styled AFTERMATHematics) is a collaborative album by Grand Mixer DXT and Bill Laswell, released on December 5, 2003 by Sub Rosa.

== Track listing ==
No.	Title	Writer(s)	Length
1.	"4D"	Bill Laswell, Robert Musso, Derek Showard	5:07
2.	"Cut Virus"	Bill Laswell, Robert Musso, Derek Showard	5:50
3.	"Scratch Code"	Skiz Fernando, Bill Laswell, Derek Showard	5:53
4.	"Ghost Dub"	Bill Laswell, Derek Showard	4:46
5.	"Subcut"	Bill Laswell, Robert Musso, Derek Showard	6:09
6.	"Black Dust"	Bill Laswell, Robert Musso, Derek Showard	6:13
7.	"Lo-Tek"	Skiz Fernando, Bill Laswell, Derek Showard	5:33
8.	"Phase Draft"	Bill Laswell, Robert Musso, Derek Showard	5:52
9.	"Posthuman"	Skiz Fernando, Bill Laswell, Derek Showard	4:30
10.	"Dark Black"	Skiz Fernando, Bill Laswell, Derek Showard	5:44

== Personnel ==
Adapted from the Aftermathematics liner notes.

Musicians

- Sly Dunbar – drums (4)
- Skiz Fernando – drum programming (3, 7, 9, 10)
- Grand Mixer DXT – turntables, keyboards, percussion, effects
- Bill Laswell – instruments, musical arrangements, producer
- Robert Musso – drum programming (1, 2, 5, 6, 8), engineering

Technical personnel

- John Brown – cover art, design
- James Dellatacoma – assistant engineer, guitar (5, 8)
- Michael Fossenkemper – mastering

== Release history ==
Region	Date	Label	Format	Catalog
Belgium	2003	Sub Rosa	CD	SR216
