= Heaven & Hell (Shin Terai album) =

Studio album by Shine
- Released: February 24, 2004
- Recorded: 1999, in Japan (material from Unison)
- Genre: Electronic
- Length: 41:59
- Label: Innerrhythmic Found
- Producer: Bill Laswell

Shine chronology
Unison (2001)	Heaven & Hell (2004)	Lightyears (2007)

Professional ratings
Review scores
Source	Rating
Allmusic	4/5 stars

Heaven and Hell is the second album by Shin Terai, released in 2004. For this album the band changed the name from Shin Terai to Shine. The album is basically made out of left-overs from the 1999 sessions for Unison. Producer and bassist Bill Laswell mixed and reconstructed the album mainly using material of avant-garde guitarist Buckethead, himself and Terai.

The songs on the album were not named, but simply called "Movements".

== Track listing ==
No.	Title	Writer(s)	Length
1.	"Movement 1"	Bill Laswell and Shin Terai	4:03
2.	"Movement 2"	Bill Laswell and Shin Terai	5:56
3.	"Movement 3"	Bill Laswell and Shin Terai	9:04
4.	"Movement 4"	Bill Laswell and Shin Terai	4:11
5.	"Movement 5"	Bill Laswell and Shin Terai	5:54
6.	"Movement 6"	Bill Laswell and Shin Terai	6:12
7.	"Movement 7"	Bill Laswell and Shin Terai	6:39

== Personnel ==
- Performer (Original Material) – Buckethead, Shin Terai, Nicky Skopelitis, Bernie Worrell
- Performer (Reconstruction), Mixed By – Bill Laswell, from recording sessions material of Shin Terai's album Unison.
