= Anime Limited =

British anime distribution company

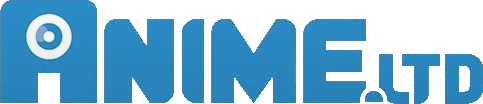
- Type: Subsidiary
- Industry: Multimedia entertainment
- Genre: Anime
- Founded: 2012; 14 years ago
- Founder: Andrew Partridge
- Headquarters: Glasgow, Scotland, United Kingdom
- Area served: United Kingdom, Ireland, France
- Key people: Kheyria Kasim (General Manager); Andrew Partridge (Managing Director)
- Owner: Embracer Group (2022-2026); Toho Co., Ltd. (2026-present)
- Parent: Plaion Pictures (2022-2026); Toho Europe Limited (2026–present)
- Website: www.alltheanime.com

Anime Limited, also known as All the Anime, is a British anime distribution company based in Glasgow, Scotland. It releases anime for British, Irish, French and other European audiences. The company was established in 2012 by Andrew Partridge, best known from his role in Scotland Loves Anime. The company releases both old and new anime titles both on home video and theatrically, aided by the Scotland Loves Anime film festival.

From 2015 to 2018, Anime Limited served as the distributors for Funimation in Britain & Ireland.

== History ==
On 14 December 2012, Kazé UK representative and Scotland Loves Anime director Andrew Partridge launched the social media and website for Anime Limited, and stated that he would be launching a new anime distribution company in 2013, with a focus on collector style home video releases, and "[developing] a theatrical market for Japanese animation" in the British market. After reaching 1000 likes on its Facebook page, on 22 December 2012, Anime Limited announced its first title acquisition, Cowboy Bebop, with a home video release scheduled for Q3 2013.

On 4 October 2013, Anime Limited announced that it had partnered with French streaming service Wakanim to launch the UK version of the site, with Anime Limited's catalogue being made available on the service.

In March 2014, Kazé founder Cédric Littardi and Anime Limited established @Anime, the French division of Anime Limited, with the first titles being released in September 2014.

On 17 July 2017, Viceland UK launched a block of late night anime in partnership with Anime Limited.

On 27 October 2017, Anime Limited announced at MCM London Comic Con that they would establish a music label, All The Anime Music, and announced plans for releasing A Shape of Light and the Trigun original soundtrack. The label officially launched in 2019, with A Shape of Light and the FLCL soundtracks being released as their first vinyl releases later in the year.

On 25 October 2019, Anime Limited announced that select dubbed titles would be available for streaming on Channel 4's All 4 service as "100 Hours of Anime".

On 13 May 2020, Anime Limited announced they would host a virtual convention, Cloud Matsuri, which was held on 30–31 May 2020. The event featured guests from Science SARU, Orange, Crunchyroll, Polygon Pictures, MangaPlanet, Anime Limited and Manga Entertainment.

On 18 May 2020, Anime Limited announced it would be launching a streaming service, Screen Anime. Marketed as an "online film festival", the service presents select titles on a monthly availability. The service launched on 25 May 2020. It was announced that Screen Anime would be retired on 25 May 2021, and another annual membership plan, Anime (Un)Limited, was announced.

During Cloud Matsuri, Anime Limited announced it had licensed the rights to Neon Genesis Evangelion, and its two films Evangelion: Death (True)² and The End of Evangelion for a release on Blu-ray. The acquisition marks the first company outside of Japan to release the series on Blu-ray, and the first on home video since ADV Films (for the TV series) and Manga Entertainment (for the movies).

On 14 April 2021, Anime Limited announced it had plans to expand internationally with their music label. Additionally, Anime Limited hired former Crunchyroll Director of Community Marketing Miles Thomas as Chief Marketing Officer.

On 22 July 2022, Anime Limited and ITV signed a partnership to stream Anime Limited's titles on the ITVX streaming service in the United Kingdom.

On 18 October 2022, Austrian media company Plaion announced it had acquired Anime Limited for an undisclosed sum, and will be integrating the company under its Plaion Pictures subsidiary.

On 19 December 2025, Plaion Pictures had agreed to a deal for Toho to acquire an 100% equity share in the company for an undisclosed amount. On 5 January 2026 Anime Limited became a subsidiary of Toho Europe Limited.
