= Unison (Shin Terai album) =

Studio album by Shin Terai
- Released: 1999 (Japan), 2001 (US)
- Recorded: 1999, in Japan
- Genre: Electronic, rock, funk, jazz
- Length: 48:55
- Label: Absord Music Japan (ABCJ-60), ION (IN 2015-2)
- Producer: Bill Laswell, Shin Terai

Shin Terai chronology
Unison (1999)	Heaven & Hell (2004)

Professional ratings
Review scores
Source	Rating
Allmusic	3.5/5 stars

Unison is the first album of Japanese composer Shin Terai, released in 1999. The album features contributions of bassist and producer Bill Laswell, avant-garde guitarists Buckethead (who would join Guns N' Roses soon after the recording sessions) and Nicky Skopelitis, and Parliament-Funkadelic keyboardist Bernie Worrell. The album met very good reviews from critics mainly because of the soft guitars and the funky bass.

== Track listing ==
No.	Title	Writer(s)	Length
1.	"Clue"		1:59
2.	"Dinner of Heaven"	Nicky Skopelitis	7:46
3.	"Emotional Intelligence"	Nicky Skopelitis	7:25
4.	"Dusk"	Buckethead	7:18
5.	"Tag of War"	Buckethead	8:15
6.	"Dream Catcher"	Bernie Worrell and Robert Musso	7:52
7.	"From Texas"	Bernie Worrell and Robert Musso	8:10

== Personnel ==
- Bass, Synthesizer, Effects - Bill Laswell
- Engineers - Oz Fritz & Robert Musso
- Guitar - Buckethead
- Guitar, Sitar - Nicky Skopelitis
- Organ, Synthesizer, Clavinet - Bernie Worrell
- Voice, Synthesizer, Loops, Beats, Effects - Shin Terai
- Programming, Loops - Robert Musso
- Written by - Bill Laswell (tracks: 2 to 7), Shin Terai
- Producer - Bill Laswell, Shin Terai
- Mixed by - Bill Laswell
- Mastered by - Michael Fossenkemper
