= Brutal Calling =

Studio album by Bill Laswell and Submerged
- Released: May 25, 2004
- Recorded: Died and Went to Hell Studios; Orange Music, West Orange, NJ
- Genre: Drum and bass, electronic
- Length: 51:21
- Label: Avant
- Producer: Bill Laswell, Submerged

Bill Laswell chronology
A Navel City/No One Is There (2004)	Brutal Calling (2004)	Soup Live (2004)

Brutal Calling is a collaborative album by Bill Laswell and Submerged, released on May 25, 2004 by Avant Records. It was also issued for a limited time in vinyl format on the German label Karlrecords and was the debut release for that company.

== Track listing ==
All music is composed by Kurt Gluck and Bill Laswell.

No.	Title	Length
1.	"Mass Graves"	5:54
2.	"Tunnel 110"	7:18
3.	"Doctored Intelligence"	6:18
4.	"Not Tomorrow or Never"	6:27
5.	"Decapitation Strike"	6:28
6.	"Whistleblower Body"	7:08
7.	"Lockdown on Bridges and Tunnels"	5:38
8.	"UXO"	6:10

== Personnel ==
Adapted from the Brutal Calling liner notes.

Musicians

- Bill Laswell – bass guitar, effects, producer, mixing
- Submerged – drum programming, effects, producer

Technical personnel

- James Dellatacoma – assistant engineer
- Michael Fossenkemper – mastering
- Ikue Mori – design
- Robert Musso – engineering
- Alex Theoret – mastering

== Release history ==
Region	Date	Label	Format	Catalog
Japan	2004	Avant	CD	Avan 081
Germany	2007	Karlrecords	LP	KR 001
