= A Navel City/No One Is There =

Studio album by Hoppy Kamiyama + Bill Laswell
- Released: May 2004
- Recorded: Gok Sound, Tokyo, Japan
- Genre: Avant-garde jazz
- Length: 59:43
- Label: Creage/Yamaha
- Producer: Hoppy Kamiyama, Bill Laswell

Bill Laswell chronology
Soup (2003)	A Navel City/No One Is There (2004)	Brutal Calling (2004)

Professional ratings
Review scores
Source	Rating
Allmusic	4/5 stars
PopMatters	(7/10)
Stylus	(C+)

A Navel City/No One Is There is a collaborative album by Hoppy Kamiyama and Bill Laswell, released in May 2004 by Creage.

== Track listing ==
All music is composed by Hoppy Kamiyama and Bill Laswell.

No.	Title	Length
1.	"Azlo"	8:50
2.	"Todes Fuge"	6:17
3.	"Sospirando"	4:09
4.	"The Desert"	13:52
5.	"Zarathustra"	6:10
6.	"Sad Emission"	16:19
7.	"Parrot Fashions"	4:06

== Personnel ==
Adapted from the A Navel City/No One Is There liner notes.

Musicians

- Hoppy Kamiyama – Digital President, asshole box, Slide Geisha, gram pot, producer
- Bill Laswell – bass guitar, effects, producer, mixing
- Kiyohiko Semba – drums, electronic drums, percussion

Technical personnel

- Michael Fossenkemper – mastering
- Kio Griffith – design
- Yoshiaki Kondo – recording
- Robert Musso – engineering
- Kyoko Ohya – design
- Alex Theoret – mastering

== Release history ==
Region	Date	Label	Format	Catalog
Japan	2004	Creage	CD	YMCC-2001
United States	2004	Kanpai	CD	73043-2
