= Shin Terai =

Japanese musician and producer

Shin Terai is a Japanese musician and producer most known for his work with Bill Laswell and Buckethead. On his albums he combines ambient and electronic music with dub and avant-garde jazz.

== Biography ==
Shin Terai gained some first publicity as the singer of Chaos Face, a project by Laswell and Robert Musso. Second singer on Chaos Face's only album Doom Ride was Mick Harris, the former drummer of the metal band Napalm Death.

The first album under Shin Terai's own name was Unison, released in 1999. Guest musicians included Bernie Worrell and Nicky Skopelitis, besides Laswell and Buckethead. In 2004, Laswell reworked the material for the remix album Heaven & Hell. Intermediately Terai worked as producer of Soup, a trio consisting of Laswell, guitarist Otomo Yoshihide and drummer Yasuhiro Yoshigake (also playing trumpet).

In 2007, with Lightyears another album was released under his own name. It featured the core members Laswell, Buckethead and Worrell, besides Nils Petter Molvær (trumpet), Lili Hayden (violin), Karl Berger (strings), DXT (turntables) and Laswell's wife Gigi. Additionally, Aman Laswell (son of Gigi and Bill) can be heard gabbling. Lightyears was dedicated to him.

== Discography (partial) ==
- 1994: Chaos Face - Doom Ride (as singer)
- 1999: Shin Terai - Unison
- 2003: Soup - Soup (as producer)
- 2004: Soup - Soup Live (as producer)
- 2004: Shin.e - Heaven & Hell
- 2007: Shin.e - Lightyears
