= Santiago Vázquez (musician) =

Argentine musician (born 1972)

Santiago Vázquez (born 1972) is an Argentine musician, percussionist, composer and conductor from Buenos Aires. He developed Rhythm with Signs (Ritmo con Señas), a musical method that uses hand signals to conduct improvised performances.

== Career ==
From the 1990s onwards, Vázquez founded and led several musical projects, including Puente Celeste, which he formed in 1997. In 2005, Puente Celeste received a Diploma al Mérito in the jazz category of the Konex Awards.

In 2006, he founded the percussion ensemble La Bomba de Tiempo to perform using Rhythm with Signs. The ensemble's conductor uses hand signals to guide the musicians and shape collective improvisation in real time. Vázquez directed the ensemble until 2014.

He has also led groups including La Grande and PAN, and has taught and promoted Rhythm with Signs.

In 2018, the Buenos Aires City Legislature recognized Vázquez as a distinguished cultural figure (Personalidad Destacada). He received the diploma at a ceremony in 2019.

== Activities in Japan ==
In the early 2000s, Vázquez was introduced to Japanese audiences as part of the Argentine experimental music scene, known in Japan as アルゼンチン音響派, alongside musicians such as Juana Molina, Fernando Kabusacki and Mono Fontana. He has subsequently made repeated visits to Japan to perform with Japanese musicians and lead workshops.

== Discography ==
=== Solo albums ===
- Raamon (2003)
- Mbira y pampa (2005)
- Santiago Vázquez (2014)

=== Group and collaborative albums ===
Puente Celeste

- Santiago Vázquez & Puente Celeste
- Pasando el mar (2002)
- Mañana domingo (2004)
- Canciones (2009)
- Nama (2011)
- Puente Celeste en vivo en Café Vinilo (2011; CD and DVD)

Colectivo Eterofónico de Improvisación

- Medios de transporte (2001)

Será una Noche

- Será una noche
- La segunda (2003)

La Bomba de Tiempo

- La Bomba de Tiempo (2007)

La Grande

- Sesiones 2017–2020 (2020)

Anima Mundi (Vazquez-Yoshigaki project)

- PRIMER ENCUENTRO (2007; reissued in Japan in 2017)
- SEGUNDO PUENTE (2007; reissued in Japan in 2017)

== Bibliography ==
- Manual de ritmo y percusión con señas = Rhythm and percussion with signs handbook. Buenos Aires: Editorial Atlántida, 2013. Spanish–English bilingual edition. ISBN 978-950-08-4186-3.
