= Rovo =

Japanese psychedelic trance rock band

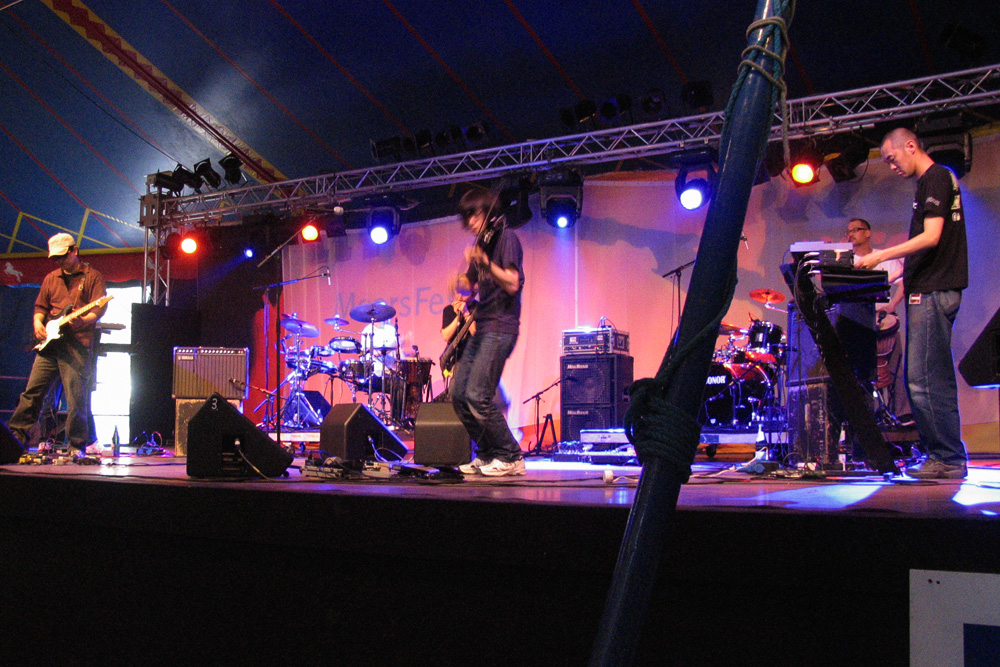
- Rovo at Moers Festival 2004, Germany

Background information
- Origin: Tokyo, Japan
- Genres: Post-rock, psychedelia, avant-garde, electronic, trance
- Years active: 1996–present
- Labels: Sony Music Entertainment, Warner Indies Network, Tzadik
- Members: Seiichi Yamamoto; Yuji Katsui; Tatsuki Masuko; Yasuhiro Yoshigaki; Jin Harada; Youichi Okabe
- Website: rovo.jp

Rovo is a Japanese instrumental band founded in 1996 in Tokyo by guitarist Seiichi Yamamoto (Boredoms), electric violinist Yuji Katsui (Bondage Fruit), and synthesizer/effects technician Tatsuki Masuko, and featuring Yasuhiro Yoshigaki on drums and percussion, Youichi Okabe on drums and percussion, and Jin Harada on bass guitar. Rovo defines their music as "man-drive trance," and many of their compositions have a repetitive minimalism, blended with progressive rock and psychedelic music, related to the style of bands such as Gong, Neu!, and Simple Minds (circa 1981). They collaborated with Gong guitarist (and former Simple Minds producer) Steve Hillage's group System 7 on the 2013 album "Phoenix Rising".

== Discography ==
- Pico! (1998), Sony Music Entertainment
- Imago (1999), Sony Music Entertainment
- Pyramid (2000), Sony Music Entertainment
- Sai (2001), Hi-Fidelity Flag Disc/Warner Indies Network
- Sino / Pan-American Beef Stake Art Federations split 12" with Date Course Pentagon Royal Garden (2001), P-Vine Records
- Tonic 2001 live double album (2002), Tzadik Records
- Flage (2002), Hi-Fidelity Flag Disc/Warner Indies Network
- Mon (2004), Hi-Fidelity Flag Disc/First Aid Network
- Condor (2006), Wonderground Music
- Nuou (2008), Wonderground Music
- Ravo (2010), Wonderground Music
- Phase (2012)
- Phoenix Rising (2013) with System 7, a-wave
- XI (2016), Wonderground Music
