= Otomo Yoshihide =

Japanese multi-instrumentalist (born 1959)

Otomo Yoshihide 大友 良英
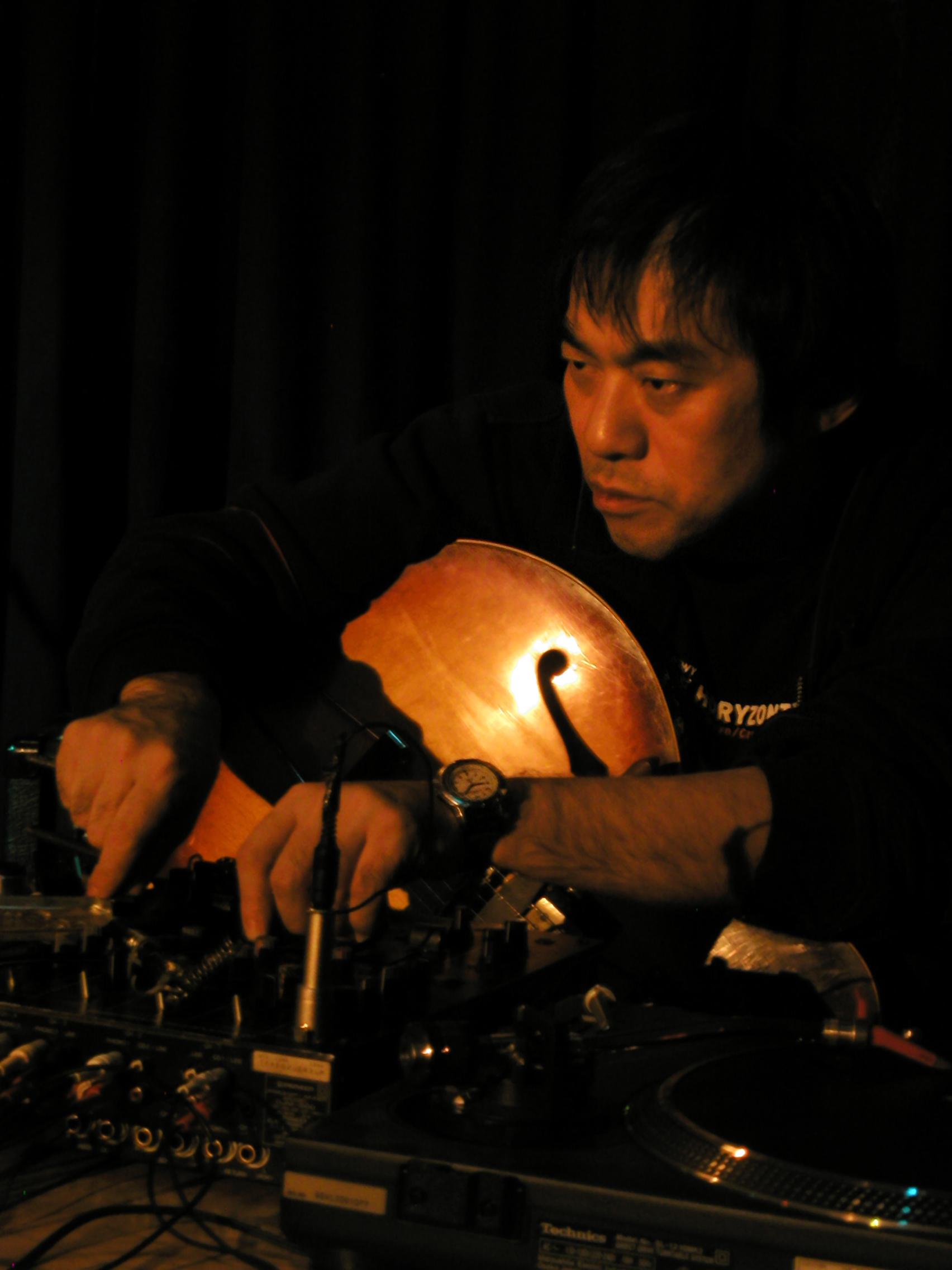
- Otomo performing live at Club w71, Weikersheim in 2007

Background information
- Born: August 1, 1959 (age 67); Yokohama, Japan
- Genres: Jazz, noise, avant-garde jazz
- Occupations: Musician, composer
- Instruments: Guitar, turntables
- Years active: 1987–present
- Labels: Recommended, P-Vine, Tzadik, Erstwhile
- Formerly of: Ground Zero

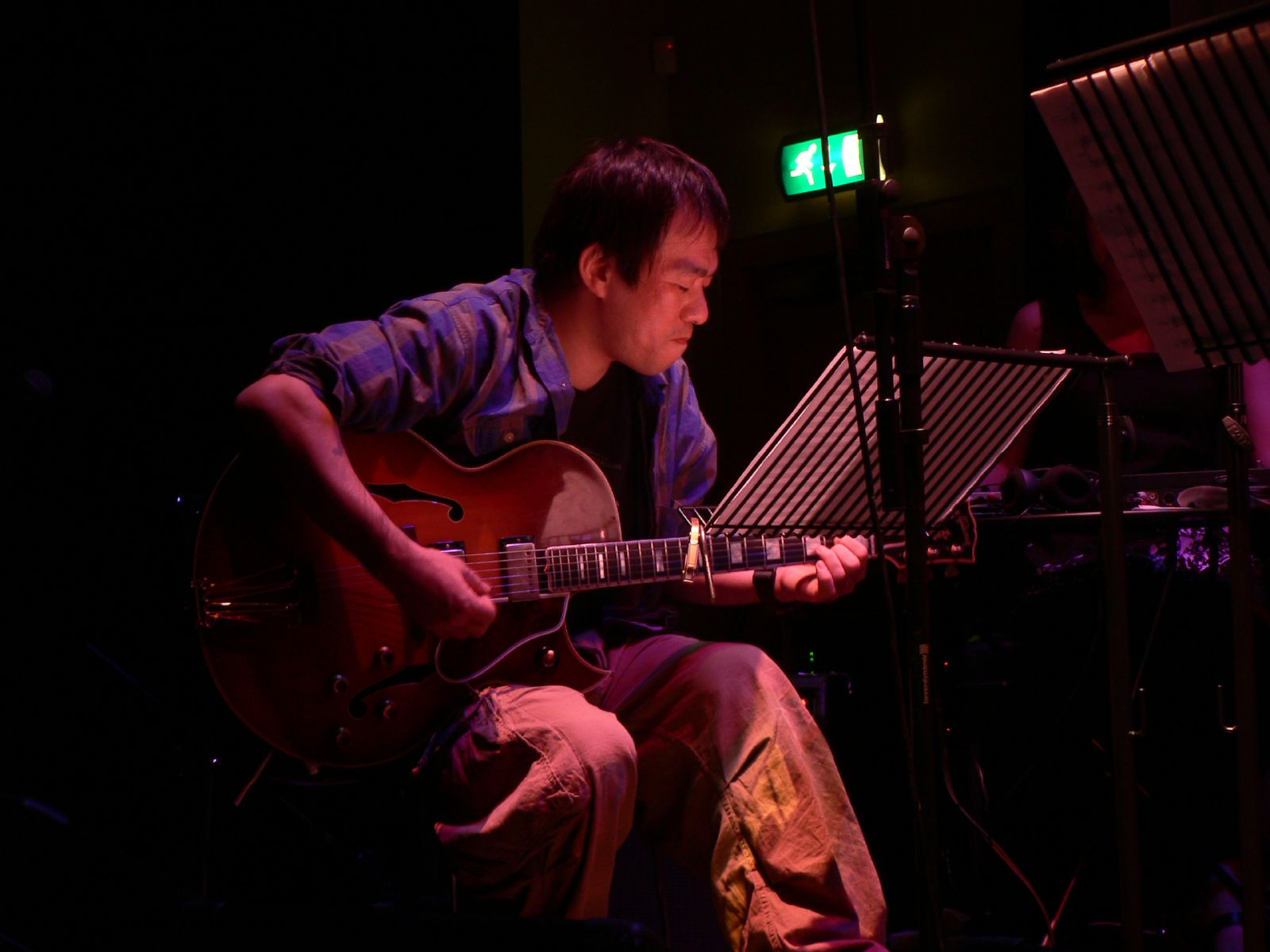
Otomo performing live in May 2005

Otomo Yoshihide (大友 良英, Ōtomo Yoshihide; born August 1, 1959) is a Japanese composer and multi-instrumentalist. He mainly plays guitar, turntables and electronics.

He first came to international prominence in the 1990s as the leader of the experimental rock group Ground Zero, and has since worked in a variety of contexts, ranging from free improvisation to noise, jazz, avant-garde and contemporary classical. He is also a pioneering figure in the EAI-scene, and is featured on important records on labels like Erstwhile Records. He has composed music for many films, television dramas, and commercials. In 2017, Otomo became the 2nd Guest Artistic Director of The Sapporo International Art Festival 2017.

== Biography ==
=== Early life ===
Otomo was born in Yokohama in 1959, but due to his father's job, moved to Fukushima when he was nine years old. In high school, he frequented jazz cafés and started his own band. After entering university, he began studying under the improvisational jazz guitarist Masayuki Takayanagi. He began performing around the world and released his first album in 1991 in Hong Kong. It was when the music he composed for a 1994 Hong Kong film was well received at the Cannes Film Festival that he also began to work as a composer.

=== Film and television ===
Otomo has composed music for a number of films and television programs, including Naoki Kato's Abraxas, Tsuyoshi Inoue's The Town's Children, and Ryuichi Hiroki's Yellow Elephant. He composed the music for the 2013 NHK morning television drama Amachan and it became his most commercially successful work up to that point. The soundtrack for Amachan reached number 5 on the Oricon Albums Chart, and Kyōko Koizumi's version of the song Shiosai no Memorī from the drama, composed by Otomo, reached number 2 on the Oricon Singles Chart. He performed live on New Year's Eve at the 2013 Kōhaku Uta Gassen.

== Selected discography ==
=== Studio albums ===
- Otomo Yoshihide (1987)
- Problem (1988)
- Duo (1989) with Junji Hirose
- Silanganan Ingay (1989) with Junji Hirose
- No Problem (1990) with No Problem
- Who Is Otomo Yoshihide? (1991)
- Visions of Japan (1991) with Yuji Katsui and Hiroshi Higo
- Ground-0, No. 0 (1991)
- Terminal-Zero (1991)
- We Insist? (1992)
- Turntables Solo (1992)
- Memory Disorder (1993)
- Peril (1993) with Peril
- The Night Before the Death of the Sampling Virus (1993)
- Ground Zero (1993) with Ground Zero
- Early Works 1: 81-85 (1994)
- Monogatari: Amino Argot (1994) with Carl Stone
- Balance of Power: Variety (1994) with Hiedaki Sasaki
- All at Once at Any Time (1994) with David Moss and John King
- Multiverse (1994) with Peril
- Null & Void (1995) with Ground Zero
- Tatakiuri (1995) with Jon Rose
- Revolutionary Pekinese Opera (1995) with Ground Zero
- Revolutionary Pekinese Opera, Version 1.28 (1996) with Ground Zero
- Duo Improvisation (1996) with Yasuhiro Otani
- p53 (1996) with p53
- Twins!! (1996) with Bob Ostertag
- Ututu: Doppo Jukyo-at no Ho e Atelier El Sur (1996) with Kiwao Nomura and Keiki Midorikawa
- My Dear Mummy (1997) with Masahiko Shimada
- Memory & Money (1997) with Les Sculpteurs de Vinyl
- Conflagration (1997) with Ground Zero
- Consume Red (1997) with Ground Zero
- Plays Standards (1997) with Ground Zero
- Sound Factory (1997)
- Melted Memory (1997)
- Vinyl Tranquilizer (1997)
- Filament 1 (1998) with Filament
- Consummation (1998) with Ground Zero
- Gravity Clock (1998) with I.S.O.
- Memory Defacement (1998)
- Television Power Electric (1999) with Jim Baker, Aeron Bergman, Todd Carter, Brent Gutzeit, Michael Hartman, Ernst Long, and R. Wilkus
- Filament 2: Secret Recordings (1999) with Filament
- I.S.O. (1999) with I.S.O.
- Bits, Bots and Signs (1999) with Voice Crack
- Metal Tastes like Orange (1999) with Masahiko Okura, Günter Müller, and Taku Sugimoto
- Cathode (1999)
- Plays the Music of Takeo Yamashita (1999)
- Four Focuses (1999) with Martin Tétreault, Yasuhiro Otani, and Sachiko M
- 21 Situations (1999) with Martin Tétreault
- Panty Christ (1999) with Justin Bond and Bob Ostertag
- Pilgrimage (1999) with Microcosmos
- Without Kuryokhin (1999) with Kenny Millions
- Moving Parts (2000) with Christian Marclay
- Music for Dance Art Hong Kong's "Memory Disorder" (2000)
- Anode (2001)
- Flutter (2001) with Otomo Yoshihide's New Jazz Quintet
- 29092000 (2001) with Filament
- Thumb (2002) with Keith Rowe, Oren Ambarchi, Sachiko M, and Robbie Avenaim
- Ensemble Cathode (2002)
- Les Hautes Solitudes: A Philippe Garrel Film: Imaginarry Soundtrack (2002) with Taku Sugimoto and Sachiko M
- Miira ni Naru made: German Version (2002) with Masahiko Shimada
- Pulser (2002) with Otomo Yoshihide's New Jazz Quintet
- Invisible Architecture No. 1 (2002) with Philip Jeck and Martin Tétreault
- Ajar (2002) with Almá Fury, Yasuhiro Otani, and Xavier Charles
- Dreams (2002) with Otomo Yoshihide's New Jazz Ensemble
- Tails Out (2003) with Otomo Yoshihide's New Jazz Quintet
- ONJQ + OE (2003) with Otomo Yoshihide's New Jazz Quintet and Tatsuya Oe
- ONJQ + OE: Short Density (2003) with Otomo Yoshihide's New Jazz Quintet and Tatsuya Oe
- Turntables and Computers (2003) with Nobukazu Takemura
- Studio—Analogique—Numérique (2003) with Martin Tétreault
- Time Travel (2003) with Günter Müller
- Warholes or All Andy Would Enjoy (And Fear) / Warhol Memory Disorder (2003) with Lengow, Heyermears, and Sachiko M
- Soup (2003) with Bill Laswell and Yasuhiro Yoshigaki
- Loose Community (2003) with Park Je Chun and Mi Yeon
- The Crushed Pellet (2003) with Eiichi Hayashi and Yoshisaburo Toyozumi
- Turntable Solo (2004)
- Compositions for Guitars Vol. 2 (2004) with Tetuzi Akiyama, Toshimaru Nakamura, and Taku Unami
- Brackwater (2004) with Korber, Tomas, eRikm, and Toshimaru Nakamura
- Good Morning Good Night (2004) with Sachiko M and Toshimaru Nakamura
- Intonarumori Orchestra (2004) with Intonarumori Orchestra
- Filament Box (2004) with Filament
- 1. Grrr (2004) with Martin Tétreault
- 2. Tok (2005) with Martin Tétreault
- 3. Ahhh (2005) with Martin Tétreault
- 4. Hmmm (2005) with Martin Tétreault
- Out to Lunch (2005) with Otomo Yoshihide's New Jazz Orchestra
- See You in a Dream (2005) with Yuki Saga
- Trace Cuts (2005) with eRikm, Martin Tétreault
- Otomo Yoshihide's New Jazz Orchestra (2005) with Otomo Yoshihide's New Jazz Orchestra
- Time Magic City (2006) with BusRatch
- Episome (2006) with Bill Laswell and Tatsuya Yoshida
- Sora (2007)
- Prisoner: A Film by Adachi Masao: Original Soundtrack (2007)
- Multiple Otomo (2007)
- Encounter (2007) with Itaru Oki
- Modulation with 2 Electric Guitars and 2 Amplifiers (2007)
- Modulation with 2 Electric Guitars and 2 Amplifiers: Alternative Version (2008)
- Core Anode (2008)
- Country Kill (2008) with Joy Heights
- Les Archives Sauvées des Eaux (2008) with Luc Ferrari
- Guitar Duo (2008) with Seiichi Yamamoto
- Sweet Cuts, Distant Curves (2008) with Choi, Joonyong, Hong Chulki, and Sachiko M
- Monte Alto Estate (2009) with Sim
- Guitar Duo x Solo (2009) with Shinichi Isohata
- Shinjuku Crawl (2009) with The Thing
- Good Cop Bad Cop (2009) with Derek Bailey, Tony Bevan, and Paul Hession
- Ultra Miracle Love Story (2009)
- Book from Hell (2010) with Zai Kuning and Dickson Dee
- 3-Part In(ter)ventions (2012) with Jim O'Rourke
- Piano Solo (2013)
- Existence (2013) with Shinichi Isohata
- Quintet/Sextet (2013) with Sachiko M, Evan Parker, John Butcher, John Edwards and Tony Marsh,

=== Live albums ===
- Live at Aketa-no-mise in Tokyo, July 28, 1989 (1989)
- Solo Live in Kyoto 93 (1995)
- Revolutionary Pekinese Opera, Tokyo 1995 (1995) with Ground Zero
- Live! (1995) with Eye Yamatsuka
- Live!! (1996) with Eye Yamatsuka
- Session 18 Oct. 1997 (1998) with Seed Mouth
- Live at Otis! (1998) with Sachiko M and Yoshimitsu Ichiraku
- Live (1998) with I.S.O.
- Last Concert (1999) with Ground Zero
- Guitar Solo Live 1 (1999)
- Live (2002) with Otomo Yoshihide's New Jazz Quintet
- Turntables Solo Live, 28 Feb 2002 in Tokyo (2002)
- Soup Live (2004) with Bill Laswell and Yasuhiro Yoshigaki
- Erst Live 004 (2005) with Christian Fennesz, Sachiko M, and Peter Rehberg
- Erst Live 005 (2005) with Keith Rowe, Sachiko M, and Toshimaru Nakamura
- Concert in St. Louis (2005) with Grnr Coleman, Franz Hautzinger, and Sachiko M
- Guitar Solo: 12 October 2004 @ Shinjuku Pit Inn, Tokyo + 1 (2005)
- ONJQ Live in Lisbon (2006) with Otomo Yoshihide's New Jazz Quintet
- Live 1992 (2007) with Ground Zero
- Live Vol. 1: Series Circuit (2007) with Otomo Yoshihide's New Jazz Orchestra
- Live Vol. 2: Parallel Circuit (2007) with Otomo Yoshihide's New Jazz Orchestra

=== Singles ===
- Otomo + Mao (1995)
- Revolutionary Pekinese Opera, Version 1.50 (1996) with Ground Zero
- Live Mao '99 (1996) with Ground Zero
- Untitled (1996) with Eye Yamatsuka
- Museum of Towing & Recovery (1998) with Steve Beresford
- Lupin the Third: Ending Theme (1999)
- Split 7" (1999) with Christian Marclay
- Re/cycling Rectangle (2000)
- Digital Tranquilizer Ver. 1.0 (2004)
- Digital Tranquilizer Ver. 1.01 (2004)
- 4 Speakers (2009)

=== DVDs ===
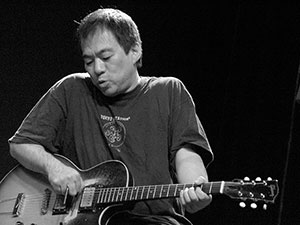
Otomo performing in Denmark

- Dark Room Filled with Light (2006) with Filament
- Music(s) (2006)
- Ensembles 09: Pre-opening Live at Shinjuku Pit Inn (2009)

=== As sideman ===
With Rova::Orchestrova

- Electric Ascension (Atavistic, 2005)

== Film scores ==
=== Film ===
- The Blue Kite (1993)
- The Day the Sun Turned Cold (1994)
- Summer Snow (1995)
- Postman (1995)
- The Sun Has Ears (1996)
- Hu-Du-Men (1996)
- Kitchen (1997)
- Wait and See (1998)
- Kaza-hana (2000)
- Blue (2001)
- Les Hautes Solitudes: Philippe Garrel Film (2002)
- Sorry (2002)
- Iden & Tity (2003)
- Déracine (2004)
- Canary (2005)
- The Angel's Egg (2006)
- Boku wa Imōto ni Koi o Suru (2007)
- Ultra Miracle Love Story (2009)
- Tokyo Island (2010)
- Abraxas (2010)
- The Town's Children (2011)
- Olo the Boy from Tibet (2012)
- Botchan (2012)
- Yellow Elephant (2013)
- Junan (2013)
- Piece of Cake (2015)
- Orange (2015)
- Close-Knit (2017)
- Tracey (2018)
- Beneath the Shadow (2020)
- You've Got a Friend (2022)
- Noise (2022)
- Inu-Oh (2022)
- The Zen Diary (2022)
- Revolution+1 (2022)
- BAUS: The Ship's Voyage Continues (2025)
- Hokusai's Daughter (2025)

=== Television ===
- Amachan (2013)
- Idaten (2019)
- Nabe ni Tama o Ukenagara (2027)
