= Emptiness =

Sense of generalized boredom, social alienation and apathy

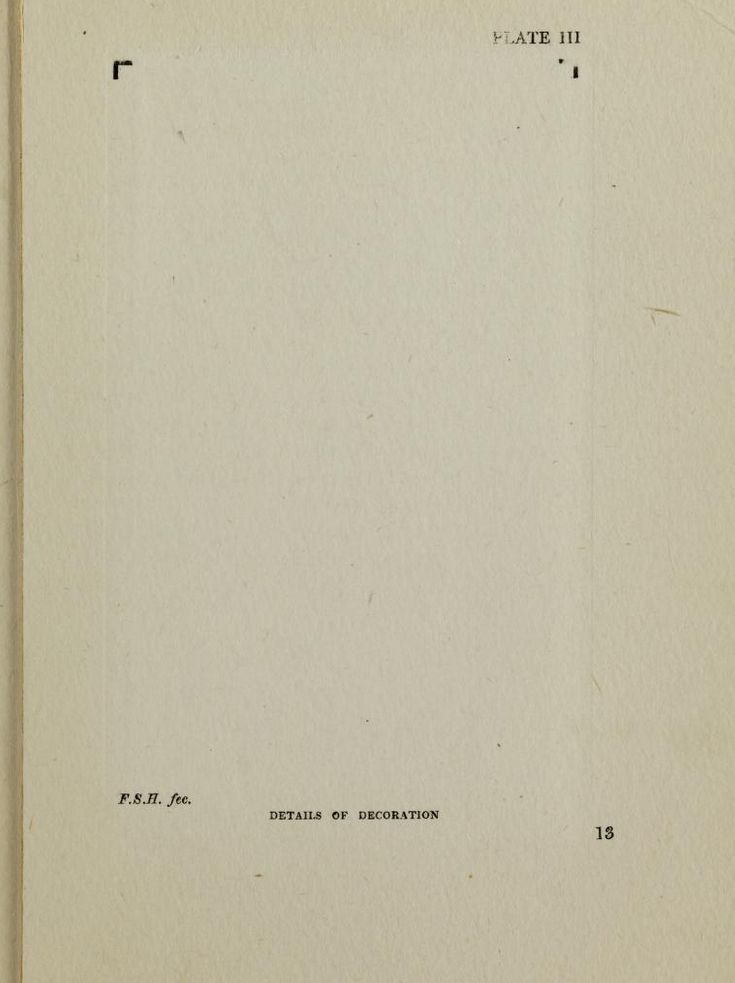
An illustrative page rendered empty by absence of Plate III

Emptiness as a human condition is a sense of generalized boredom, social alienation, nihilism, and apathy. Feelings of emptiness often accompany dysthymia, depression, loneliness, anhedonia, despair, or other mental/emotional disorders, including schizoid personality disorder, post-traumatic stress disorder, attention deficit hyperactivity disorder, schizotypal personality disorder and borderline personality disorder. A sense of emptiness is also part of a natural process of grief, as resulting death of a loved one, or other significant changes. The particular meanings of "emptiness" vary with the particular context and the religious or cultural tradition in which it is used.

While Christianity and Western sociologists and psychologists view a state of emptiness as a negative, unwanted condition, in some Eastern philosophies such as Buddhist philosophy and Taoism, emptiness (Śūnyatā) represents seeing through the illusion of independent self-nature.

== In Western culture ==
=== Sociology, philosophy, and psychology ===
In the West, feeling "empty" is often viewed as a negative condition. Psychologist Clive Hazell, for example, attributes feelings of emptiness to problematic family backgrounds with abusive relationships and mistreatment. He claims that some people who are facing a sense of emptiness try to resolve their painful feelings by becoming addicted to a drug or obsessive activity (be it compulsive sex, gambling or work) or engaging in "frenzied action" or violence. In sociology, a sense of emptiness is associated with social alienation of the individual. This sense of alienation may be suppressed while working, due to the routine nature of work tasks, but during leisure hours or during the weekend, people may feel a sense of "existential vacuum" and emptiness.

In political philosophy, emptiness is associated with nihilism. Literary critic Georg Lukács (born in 1885) argued against the "spiritual emptiness and moral inadequacy of capitalism", and argued in favour of communism as an "entirely new type of civilization, one that promised a fresh start and an opportunity to lead a meaningful and purposeful life."

The concept of "emptiness" was important to a "certain type of existentialist philosophy and some forms of the Death of God movement". Existentialism, the "philosophic movement that gives voice to the sense of alienation and despair", comes from "man's recognition of his fundamental aloneness in an indifferent universe". People whose response to the sense of emptiness and aloneness is to give excuses live in bad faith; "people who face the emptiness and accept responsibility aim to live 'authentic' lives". Existentialists argue that "man lives in alienation from God, from nature, from other men, from his own true self." Crowded into cities, working in mindless jobs, and entertained by light mass media, we "live on the surface of life", so that even "people who seemingly have 'everything' feel empty, uneasy, discontented."

In cultures where a sense of emptiness is seen as a negative psychological condition, it is often associated with depression. As such, many of the same treatments are proposed: psychotherapy, group therapy, or other types of counselling. As well, people who feel empty may be advised to keep busy and maintain a regular schedule of work and social activities. Other solutions which have been proposed to reduce a sense of emptiness are getting a pet or trying Animal-Assisted Therapy; getting involved in spirituality such as meditation or religious rituals and service; volunteering to fill time and bring social contact; doing social interactions, such as community activities, clubs, or outings; or finding a hobby or recreational activity to regain their interest in life.

=== Christianity ===
In Austria philosopher/educator Rudolf Steiner's (1861–1925) thinking, spiritual emptiness was a major problem in the educated European middle class. In his 1919 lectures he argued that European culture became "empty of spirit" and "ignorant of the needs, the conditions, that are essential for the life of the spirit". People experienced a "spiritual emptiness" and their thinking became marked by a "lazy passivity" due to the "absence of will from the life of thought". In modern Europe, Steiner claimed that people would "allow their thoughts to take possession of them", and these thoughts were increasingly filled with abstraction and "pure, natural scientific thinking". The educated middle classes began to think in a way that was "devoid of spirit", with their minds becoming "dimmer and darker", and increasing empty of spirit.

Louis Dupré, a professor of philosophy at Yale University, argues that the "spiritual emptiness of our time is a symptom of its religious poverty". He claims that "many people never experience any emptiness: they are too busy to feel much absence of any kind"; they only realize their spiritual emptiness if "painful personal experiences -- the death of a loved one, the collapse of a marriage, the alienation of a child, the failure of a business" shock them into reassessing their sense of meaning.

Spiritual emptiness has been associated with juvenile violence. In John C. Thomas' 1999 book How Juvenile Violence Begins: Spiritual Emptiness, he argues that youth in impoverished indigenous communities who feel empty may turn to fighting and aggressive crime to fill their sense of meaninglessness. In Cornell University professor James Garbarino's 1999 book Lost Boys: Why Our Sons Turn Violent and How We Can Save Them, he argues that "neglect, shame, spiritual emptiness, alienation, anger and access to guns are a few of the elements common to violent boys". A professor of human development, Garbarino claims that violent boys have an "alienation from positive role models" and "a spiritual emptiness that spawns despair". These youth are seduced by the violent fantasy of the US gun culture, which provides negative role models of tough, aggressive men who use power to get what they want. He claims that boys can be helped by giving them "a sense of purpose" and "spiritual anchors" that can "anchor boys in empathy and socially engaged moral thinking".

Spiritual emptiness is often connected with addiction, especially by Christian-influenced addiction organizations and counsellors. Bill Wilson, the founder of Alcoholics Anonymous, argued that one of the impacts of alcoholism was causing a spiritual emptiness in heavy drinkers. In Abraham J. Twerski's 1997 book Addictive Thinking: Understanding Self-Deception, he argues that when people feel spiritually empty, they often turn to addictive behaviors to fill the inner void. In contrast to having an empty stomach, which is a clear feeling, having spiritual emptiness is hard to identify, so it fills humans with a "vague unrest". While people may try to resolve this emptiness by obsessively having sex, overeating, or taking drugs or alcohol, these addictions only give temporary satisfaction. When a person facing a crisis due to feeling spiritually empty is able to stop one addiction, such as compulsive sex, they often just trade it in for another addictive behaviour, such as gambling or overeating.

=== Fiction, film, design and visual arts ===
A number of novelists and filmmakers have depicted emptiness. The concept of "emptiness" was important to a "good deal of 19th–20th century Western imaginative literature". Novelist Franz Kafka depicted a meaningless bizarre world in The Trial and the existentialist French authors sketched a world cut off from purpose or reason in Jean-Paul Sartre's La Nausée and Albert Camus' L'étranger. Existentialism influenced 20th century poet T.S. Eliot, whose poem "The Love Song of J. Alfred Prufrock" describes an "anti-hero or alienated soul, running away from or confronting the emptiness of his or her existence". Professor Gordon Bigelow argues that the existentialist theme of "spiritual barrenness is commonplace in literature of the 20th century", which in addition to Eliot includes Ernest Hemingway, Faulkner, Steinbeck and Anderson.

Film adaptations of a number of existentialist novels capture the bleak sense of emptiness espoused by Sartre and Camus. This theme of emptiness has also been used in modern screenplays.

- Mark Romanek's 1985 film Static tells the surreal story of a struggling inventor and crucifix factory worker named Ernie who feels spiritually empty because he is saddened by his parents' death in an accident.
- Screenwriter Michael Tolkin's 1994 film The New Age examines "cultural hipness and spiritual emptiness", creating a "dark, ambitious, unsettling" film that depicts a fashionable LA couple who "are miserable in the midst of their sterile plenty", and whose souls are stunted by their lives of empty sex, consumption, and distractions.
- The 1999 film American Beauty examines the spiritual emptiness of life in the US suburbs.
- Wes Anderson's 2007 film The Darjeeling Limited is about three brothers who "suffer from spiritual emptiness" and then "self-medicate themselves through sex, social withdrawal, and drugs."
- The 2008 film The Informers is a Hollywood drama film written by Bret Easton Ellis and Nicholas Jarecki and directed by Gregor Jordan. The film is based on Ellis' 1994 collection of short stories of the same name. The film, which is set amidst the decadence of the early 1980s, depicts an assortment of socially alienated, mainly well-off characters who numb their sense of emptiness with casual sex, alcohol, and drugs.

Contemporary architecture critic Herbert Muschamp argues that "horror vacui" (which is Latin for "fear of emptiness") is a key principle of design. He claims that it has become an obsessive quality that is the "driving force in contemporary American taste". Muschamp states that "along with the commercial interests that exploit this interest, it is the major factor now shaping attitudes toward public spaces, urban spaces, and even suburban sprawl."

Films that depict nothingness, shadows and vagueness, either in a visual sense or a moral sense are appreciated in genres such as film noir. As well, travellers and artists are often intrigued by and attracted to vast empty spaces, such as open deserts, barren wastelands or salt flats, and the open sea.

In visual arts emptiness and absence were recognized as phenomena that characterize not only particular works of art (e.g. Yves Klein) but also as a more general tendency within the history of modern art and aesthetics. Following Davor Džalto's argument on the modern concept of art, the gradual elimination of particular elements that traditionally characterized visual arts, which results in emptiness, is the most important phenomenon within the history and theory of art over the past two hundred years.

== In Eastern cultures ==
=== Buddhism ===
The Buddhist term emptiness (Skt. śūnyatā) refers specifically to the idea that everything is dependently originated, including the causes and conditions themselves, and even the principle of causality itself. It is not nihilism, nor is it meditating on nothingness. Instead, it refers to the absence (emptiness) of inherent existence. Buddhapalita says:

What is the reality of things just as it is? It is the absence of essence. Unskilled persons whose eye of intelligence is obscured by the darkness of delusion conceive of an essence of things and then generate attachment and hostility with regard to them.

— Buddhapālita-mula-madhyamaka-vrtti P5242,73.5.6-74.1.2

In an interview, the Dalai Lama stated that tantric meditation can be used for "heightening your own realization of emptiness or mind of enlightenment". In Buddhist philosophy, attaining a realization of emptiness of inherent existence is key to the permanent cessation of suffering, i.e. liberation.

Even while an ordinary being, if upon hearing of emptiness great joy arises within again and again, the eyes moisten with tears of great joy, and the hairs of the body stand on end, such a person has the seed of the mind of a complete Buddha; He is a vessel for teachings on thatness, and ultimate truth should be taught to him. After that, good qualities will grow in him.

— Chandrakirti, Guide to the Middle Way, vv. 6:4-5

The Dalai Lama argues that tantric yoga trainees need to realize the emptiness of inherent existence before they can go on to the "highest yoga tantra initiation"; realizing the emptiness of inherent existence of the mind is the "fundamental innate mind of clear light, which is the subtlest level of the mind", where all "energy and mental processes are withdrawn or dissolved", so that all that appears to the mind is "pure emptiness". As well, emptiness is "linked to the creative Void, meaning that it is a state of complete receptivity and perfect enlightenment", the merging of the "ego with its own essence", which Buddhists call the "clear light".

In Ven. Thubten Chodron's 2005 interview with Lama Zopa Rinpoche, the lama noted that "ordinary beings who haven't realized emptiness don't see things as similar to illusions", and one does not "realize that things are merely labeled by mind and exist by mere name". He argues that "when we meditate on emptiness, we drop an atom bomb on this [sense of a] truly existent I" and to realize that "what appears true...isn't true". By this, the lama is claiming that what is thought to be real—our thoughts and feelings about people and things—"exists by being merely labeled". He argues that meditators who attain knowledge of a state of emptiness are able to realize that their thoughts are merely illusions from labelling by the mind.

=== Taoism ===
In Taoism, attaining a state of emptiness is viewed as a state of stillness and placidity which is the "mirror of the universe" and the "pure mind". The Tao Te Ching claims that emptiness is related to the "Tao, the Great Principle, the Creator and Sustainer of everything in the universe". It is argued that it is the "state of mind of the Taoist disciple who follows the Tao", who has successfully emptied the mind "of all wishes and ideas not fitted with the Tao's Movement". For a person who attains a state of emptiness, the "still mind of the sage is the mirror of heaven and earth, the glass of all things", a state of "vacancy, stillness, placidity, tastelessness, quietude, silence, and non-action" which is the "perfection of the Tao and its characteristics, the "mirror of the universe" and the "pure mind".

== See also ==
- Boredom
- Empty nest syndrome
- Nihilism
- Physiology
- Soul
