= Less than Zero (film) =

1987 American drama film

- Theatrical release poster
- Directed by: Marek Kanievska
- Screenplay by: Harley Peyton
- Based on: Less than Zero by Bret Easton Ellis
- Produced by: Jon Avnet; Jordan Kerner
- Starring: Andrew McCarthy; Jami Gertz; Robert Downey Jr.
- Cinematography: Edward Lachman
- Edited by: Peter E. Berger; Michael Tronick
- Music by: Thomas Newman
- Production companies: 20th Century Fox; Avnet/Kerner Productions
- Distributed by: 20th Century Fox
- Release date: November 6, 1987 (United States)
- Running time: 98 minutes
- Country: United States
- Language: English
- Budget: $8 million
- Box office: $12.4 million

Less than Zero is a 1987 American drama film directed by Marek Kanievska, loosely based on the 1985 novel by Bret Easton Ellis. The film stars Andrew McCarthy as Clay, a college freshman returning home for Christmas to spend time with his ex-girlfriend Blair (Jami Gertz) and his friend Julian (Robert Downey Jr.), both of whom have become drug addicts. The film explores the culture of wealthy, decadent youth in Los Angeles.

Less than Zero received mixed reviews among critics. Ellis hated the film initially, but his view of it later softened, stating that the film bore no resemblance to his novel and feels that it was miscast apart from Downey and James Spader.

== Plot ==
Clay Easton is a strait-laced college freshman on the East Coast of the United States, who returns home to Los Angeles for Christmas to find things very different from the way he left them. His high school girlfriend and now model, Blair, has become addicted to cocaine and has been having sex with Clay's high school best friend, Julian Wells. Julian, whose life has gone downhill after his startup record company fell apart, has also become a drug addict. As a result, he has been cut off by his family for stealing to support his habit and reduced to homelessness. Julian is also being hassled by his dealer, a former classmate named Rip, for a debt of $50,000 that he owes to him.

Clay's relationship with Blair rekindles and Julian's behavior becomes more volatile. His addiction is worsening and since he does not have the money to pay off his debt, Rip forces him to become a prostitute to work it off. After suffering through a night of withdrawal and hiding from Rip, Julian decides to quit and begs his father to help him. The next day, Julian tells Rip his plans for sobriety, which Rip does not accept. Rip soon lures Julian to a Christmas party for affluent homosexual men in Palm Springs. Clay finds Julian and rescues him; after a violent confrontation with Rip and his henchman, Clay, Julian, and Blair all escape and begin the long drive through the desert so Julian can attempt to achieve sobriety once and for all. However, the damage has already been done; the next morning Julian dies from heart failure in the car.

After Julian's funeral, Clay and Blair sit on a cemetery bench and reminisce about their friend. Clay then tells Blair that he is returning to the East Coast and wants her to go with him. She agrees to his offer.

Lastly, a snapshot of the three of them at graduation is seen, the last time they were happy together.

== Cast ==
- Andrew McCarthy as Clay Easton
- Jami Gertz as Blair
- Robert Downey Jr. as Julian Wells
- James Spader as Rip
- Nicholas Pryor as Benjamin Wells
- Tony Bill as Bradford Easton
- Donna Mitchell as Elaine Easton
- Michael Bowen as Hop / Bill
- Sarah Buxton as Markie
- Jayne Modean as Cindy
- Lisanne Falk as Patti
- Neith Hunter as Alana

== Production ==
Ellis's book was originally optioned by producer Marvin Worth for $7,500 before its publication in June 1985 with the understanding that 20th Century Fox would finance it.

The purchase was sponsored by Scott Rudin and Larry Mark, vice presidents of production. The book became a best seller but the producers had to create a coherent story and change Clay, the central character, because they felt that he was too passive. They also eliminated his bisexuality and casual drug use. Worth hired Pulitzer Prize-winning playwright Michael Cristofer to write the screenplay. He stuck close to the tone of the novel and had Clay take some drugs but did not make him bisexual. The studio felt that Cristofer's script was too harsh for a commercial film.

Fox then assigned the film to producer Jon Avnet who had made Risky Business. He felt that Cristofer's script was "so depressing and degrading." Avnet instead wanted to transform "a very extreme situation" into "a sentimental story about warmth, caring and tenderness in an atmosphere hostile to those kinds of emotions". Studio executives and Avnet argued over the amount of decadence depicted in the film that would not alienate audiences. Lawrence Gordon, the President of Fox who had approved the purchase of the book, was replaced by Alan F. Horn, who was then replaced by Leonard Goldberg. Goldberg found the material distasteful but Barry Diller, the Chairman of Fox, wanted to make the film.

Harley Peyton was hired to write the script and completed three drafts. In his version, Clay is no longer amoral or passive. The studio still considered the material edgy and kept the budget under $8 million.

Claudia Weill was going to direct at one stage but then was dropped by the studio.

Marek Kanievska was hired to direct because he had dealt with ambivalent sexuality and made unlikeable characters appealing in his previous film, Another Country (1984). The studio wanted to appeal to actor Andrew McCarthy's teenage girl fans without alienating an older audience.

Cinematographer Edward Lachman remembers that originally the film was a lot "edgier" and that the studio took it away from Kanievska. He also recalled a scene he shot with the music group Red Hot Chili Peppers: "The Red Hot Chili Peppers were in that film and the studio became very conservative and they said, 'Oh the band, they're sweaty and they don't have their shirts on.' They destroyed an incredible Steadicam shot, all because they had to cut around them being bare-chested".

At an early test screening, the studio recruited an audience from the ages of 15 to 24; they hated Robert Downey Jr.'s character. As a result, new scenes were shot to make his and Jami Gertz's characters more repentant. For example, a high school graduation scene was shot to lighten the mood by showing the three main characters as good friends during better times.

== Reception ==
=== Box office ===
Less than Zero opened at No. 4 on November 6, 1987, in 871 theaters and made US$3,008,987, behind Fatal Attraction's eighth weekend, Hello Again's opening, and Baby Boom's fifth weekend. It went on to gross $12,396,383 in North America.

=== Critical response ===
The film received mixed reviews from critics. Film historian Leonard Maltin gave it two-out-of-four stars, his most frequently given rating: "Bret Ellis' nihilistic story is sanitized into pointlessness, although chances are an entirely faithful adaptation would have turned everyone off; try to imagine this picture with Eddie Bracken, Veronica Lake, and Sonny Tufts." Indeed, Maltin despised the faithfully-adapted film version of a second Ellis novel, The Rules of Attraction, which he considered a BOMB (Maltin's lowest possible rating).

On review aggregation website Rotten Tomatoes, Less than Zero has an approval rating of 50% based on 30 reviews. The critical consensus reads: "A couple of standout performances -- notably Robert Downey, Jr. and James Spader -- and a killer soundtrack can't quite elevate a somewhat superficial adaptation of Bret Easton Ellis' story of drugged-out LA rich kids." Metacritic, which uses a weighted average, assigned the film a score of 48 out of 100, based on 13 critics, indicating "mixed or average" reviews. Audiences polled by CinemaScore gave the film an average grade of "C+" on an A+ to F scale.

In The New York Times, Janet Maslin wrote, "Mr. Downey gives a performance that is desperately moving, with the kind of emotion that comes as a real surprise in these surroundings." Rita Kempley, in her review for The Washington Post, called the film, "noodle-headed and faint-hearted, a shallow swipe at a serious problem, with a happily-ever-after ending yet." In Newsweek, David Ansen wrote, "Imagine Antonioni making a high-school public-service movie and you'll have an inkling of the movie's high-toned silliness." In the Chicago Sun-Times, Roger Ebert gave Less than Zero a four-star review, noting that the "movie knows cocaine inside out and paints a portrait of drug addiction that is all the more harrowing because it takes place in the Beverly Hills fast lane...The movie's three central performances are flawless...[Robert Downey, Jr's] acting here is so real, so subtle and so observant that it's scary...The whole movie looks brilliantly superficial, and so Downey's predicament is all the more poignant: He is surrounded by all of this, he is in it and of it, and yet he cannot have it." New York magazine's David Denby wrote, "In many ways, Less than Zero is a cynical, manipulative job. Yet, the movie has something great in it, something that could legitimately move teenagers (or anyone else): Robert Downey Jr. as the disintegrating Julian, a performance in which beautiful exuberance gives way horrifyingly to a sudden, startled sadness."

Upon its initial release, Ellis hated the film. While promoting the book Lunar Park he said he has gotten sentimental about it and has "really warmed up to it now. I've accepted it." He admits that the film bears no resemblance to his novel but that it captured, "a certain youth culture during that decade that no other movie caught," and felt that it was miscast with the exception of Downey and Spader. Furthermore, he has said, "I think that movie is gorgeous, and the performances that I thought were shaky seem much better now. Like, Jami Gertz seems much better to me now than she did 20 years ago. It’s something I can watch." In 2008, the film was voted as the 22nd best film set in Los Angeles in the last 25 years by a group of Los Angeles Times writers and editors with two criteria: it "had to communicate some inherent truth about the L.A. experience, and only one film per director was allowed on the list."

=== Awards and honors ===
The film is recognized by American Film Institute in these lists:

- 2004: AFI's 100 Years...100 Songs:
  - "A Hazy Shade of Winter" – Nominated

== Future ==
On April 14, 2009, MTV News announced that Ellis had nearly finished Imperial Bedrooms, his seventh book and the sequel to Less than Zero. Ellis has revealed that the film's main characters are all still alive in the present day, and has already begun looking ahead to the possibility of a film adaptation. Ellis feels that interpreting it as a sequel to the 1987 Less than Zero adaptation "would be a great idea" and hopes to be able to reunite Spader, McCarthy, and Gertz should Fox option the sequel.

In May 2010, Ellis confirmed in an interview that Quentin Tarantino had been "trying to get Fox to let him remake the 1987 film". In 2012, when asked whether Less than Zero would be remade, Ellis once again confirmed that Tarantino "has shown interest" in adapting the story.

== Soundtrack ==
A soundtrack containing a variety of music types was released on November 16, 1987, by Def Jam Recordings. It peaked at 31 on the Billboard 200 and 22 on the Top R&B/Hip-Hop Albums and was certified gold on February 8, 1988. One of the tracks was a cover of Simon and Garfunkel's "Hazy Shade of Winter" by the rock group The Bangles.

== See also ==
- List of Christmas films
