= The Rules of Attraction =

1987 novel by Bret Easton Ellis

- Book cover for The Rules of Attraction
- Author: Bret Easton Ellis
- Language: English
- Genre: Black comedy Satire
- Publisher: Simon & Schuster
- Publication date: September 1987
- Media type: Print (Hardcover and Paperback)
- Pages: 283 pp hardcover, 288 pp paperback
- ISBN: 978-0-671-62234-3
- OCLC: 16082603
- Dewey Decimal: 813/.54 19
- LC Class: PS3555.L5937 R8 1987

The Rules of Attraction is a satirical black comedy novel by Bret Easton Ellis published in 1987. The novel follows a handful of rowdy and often promiscuous, spoiled bohemian students at a liberal arts college in 1980s New Hampshire, including three who develop a love triangle. The novel is written in first person narrative, and the story is told from the points of view of various characters.

The book was adapted into a film of the same name in 2002. Ellis has remarked that among film adaptations of his books, The Rules of Attraction came closest to capturing his sensibility and recreating the world of his novels.

== Plot summary ==
The novel is written in the first-person, continuing the aesthetic of Ellis' earlier Less than Zero, and is told from the points of view of multiple characters. The main narrators are three students: Paul, Sean, and Lauren. A number of other characters also provide first-hand accounts throughout the story, which takes place at the fictional Camden College, a liberal arts school on the East Coast of the United States. The three main characters (who rarely attend class) end up in a love triangle within a sequence of drug runs, "Dressed to Get Screwed" parties, and "End of the World" parties.

The story begins and ends midway through a sentence (the first word in the book being "and", the last words are "and she") in order to give the effect that it begins somewhere closer to the middle, rather than at a true beginning (in medias res). Another interpretation is that the story has neither a beginning nor an ending, signifying the endless cycle of debauchery in which the characters of the novel engage. This is sometimes mistaken by readers as a typographical error or the result of a missing page, but was purposely written by Ellis.

== Characters ==
=== Sean Bateman ===
Sean is a 21-year-old student from a wealthy family. He is very promiscuous and a heavy substance abuser, as well as a drug dealer in the employ of Rupert Guest. He becomes romantically involved with Lauren, a relationship he considers to be true love. It is also implied that Sean is bisexual, as he apparently becomes involved in a sexual relationship with Paul. However, whether these encounters are real or simply a product of Paul's imagination is left ambiguous; Paul narrates sexual incidents between himself and Sean, while such incidents are absent from Sean's own narration.

Sean is very bitter, cynical, and aloof. He attempts suicide at multiple points in the book, first by hanging, then by slashing his wrist with a dull razor, and then by overdose after a falling out with Lauren. A major subplot in the novel is Sean's debt to Rupert, a violent townie drug dealer who often threatens to kill him. Sean is the brother of the notorious Patrick Bateman and has appeared or is mentioned in Ellis's other novels, American Psycho, The Informers and Glamorama.

=== Lauren Hynde ===
Lauren is a painter and poet who has sexual relations with several boys on campus, all the while pining for Victor, her boyfriend who left Camden and headed to Europe. She is often depressed and very emotional. She is in her senior year at Camden. At the beginning of the novel, it is revealed that Lauren lost her virginity at a party during her freshman year at Camden, where she got so intoxicated that she passed out in bed with another student only to awaken and find herself being raped by a pair of townies. She becomes romantically involved with Sean Bateman halfway through the book, even though she holds Sean in contempt and considers the relationship nothing but a way to pass the time before Victor comes back from Europe. She was also in a relationship with Paul before the events of the book take place. In Glamorama, the character is revealed to have died shortly after the end of this novel. Her place is then taken by a body double who becomes reacquainted with Victor after having become a successful model and actress.

=== Paul Denton ===
Paul is a young bisexual man who used to date Lauren. He is extremely attracted to Sean and claims that in bed Sean is "crazed, an untamed animal, it was almost scary." However, these thoroughly-described accounts are entirely absent from Sean's entries. For example, the night Paul writes an account of his and Sean's first sexual encounter after the two talk in Paul's bedroom, Sean writes in his own account that he simply went home after talking to Paul, the two entries therefore lying in contradiction to one another. However, the true details of this relationship remain ambiguous and open to the reader's interpretation. Paul also had relationships with two other important characters, Mitchell and Richard (Dick). Paul is highly intelligent and passionate, but is not above obscuring these facts in the course of seduction. Several characters in the book remark upon his physical attractiveness, brought out by Roman features and soft blond hair. Paul's relationship with his mother, Eve, is complex; she yearns to reach out to him but is led towards iciness by Paul's flippancy, which in turn feeds their animosity.

=== Supporting characters ===
- Victor Johnson – Lauren's boyfriend. Victor took the term off to backpack through Europe. During his time in Europe, he sleeps with many people and abuses many drugs. His entries chronicle his adventures in great detail, including a search for a girl named Jaime, who he claims to love. Lauren yearns for him, anxiously awaiting his return, and when he does come back to New Hampshire, he is not interested in seeing her at all. He is the main character in Ellis' later novel, Glamorama.
- Clay – The protagonist of Less than Zero, aka "the guy from L.A.", who narrates one chapter of the novel. His trademark lines begin "People are afraid to ...". Still unhappy while at Camden, Clay longs to return home to L.A.; he wishes the reverse in Less than Zero.
- Rupert Guest – A violent drug dealer and Sean's supplier. A major subplot in the book is Sean's debt to him.
- Richard "Dick" Jared – An old friend of Paul Denton's who attends Sarah Lawrence College. They are friends with benefits.
- Patrick Bateman – Sean's older brother, an investment banker who is much more focused and successful than Sean. The brothers loathe each other for their very different outlooks on and approaches to life. He narrates a chapter of the novel and returns as the main character of Ellis's follow-up novel, American Psycho, in which it is revealed that he is a serial killer.
- Sean's admirer – An unnamed student (although her name is probably Mary) who sends Sean anonymous love letters. Her entries in the book are all italicized letters to Sean. She hopes to reveal herself to Sean at the Dressed to Get Screwed Party midway through the book, but when she sees him leave with Lauren, she is heartbroken and commits suicide in a bathtub by slashing her wrists.
- Bertrand – Sean's French roommate, whom he despises. Sean continuously refers to him as "The Frog". He pines for Lauren and narrates one section of the book entirely in French. He also appears in Glamorama with an intense hatred for Victor from the anguish he had caused Lauren.
- Stuart – A student who moves into the room across from Paul Denton. He previously had a crush on Paul when they shared a drama class, from which Stuart subsequently withdrew after he botched a scene with Paul. He later hopes to run into Paul after he moves across the hall, and hopes (unsuccessfully) to see him at the Dressed to Get Screwed Party. He also has a friend named Dennis.
- Mitchell Allen – A previous fling of Paul's who has reverted into the closet. He later reappears in Ellis' Lunar Park.
- Roxanne – A friend of Lauren's who, like Sean, gets drugs from Rupert. Roxanne dates Rupert during the novel and Sean states that he was also seeing her at one point.
- Judy – A friend of Lauren's who sleeps with Sean after a party, which ruins Sean and Lauren's relationship.

== Setting of the novel ==
The story is set at Camden College, a fictional liberal arts college in northeastern New Hampshire that is based on Ellis' alma mater, Bennington College. The novel's "Dress To Get Screwed" parties are based on Bennington's infamous real-life "Dress To Get Laid" parties. These parties are every semester, or, later, only in the fall, since at least the 1970s. In many ways, Camden mirrors Ellis' alma mater, Bennington College, and Hampden College, the setting of Donna Tartt's novel The Secret History. Both books contain cross-references to each other's story lines and characters, as well as mention of actual campus buildings. Tartt mentions the suicide of a freshman girl in passing, while Ellis repeatedly mentions a group of classics majors who "dress like undertakers" and are suspected of staging pagan rituals and slaying farmers in the countryside (a reference to The Secret History). There is also mention of a "nice girl from Rockaway" in one of Lauren's narrations. This is possibly Alex from Jill Eisenstadt's novel From Rockaway, who attended Camden College in the novel.

== Film ==
The Rules of Attraction was adapted into a film of the same name in 2002. It was directed by Roger Avary and starred James Van Der Beek as Sean, Shannyn Sossamon as Lauren, Ian Somerhalder as Paul, and Kip Pardue as Victor.
