= The Informers (2008 film) =

- Theatrical release poster
- Directed by: Gregor Jordan
- Screenplay by: Bret Easton Ellis; Nicholas Jarecki
- Based on: The Informers; 1994 novel by Bret Easton Ellis
- Produced by: Marco Weber
- Starring: Billy Bob Thornton; Kim Basinger; Winona Ryder; Mickey Rourke; Jon Foster; Amber Heard; Rhys Ifans; Chris Isaak; Austin Nichols; Lou Taylor Pucci; Mel Raido; Brad Renfro
- Cinematography: Petra Korner
- Edited by: Robert Brakey
- Music by: Christopher Young
- Distributed by: Senator Entertainment
- Release dates: October 2008 (Sitges Film Festival); April 24, 2009 (United States)
- Running time: 98 minutes
- Country: United States
- Language: English
- Box office: $382,174

The Informers is a 2008 American drama film written by Bret Easton Ellis and Nicholas Jarecki and directed by Gregor Jordan. The film is based on Ellis's 1994 collection of short stories of the same name. The film, which is set amidst the decadence of the early 1980s, depicts an assortment of socially alienated, mainly well-off characters who numb their sense of emptiness with casual sex, alcohol, and drugs. The filming took place in Los Angeles, Uruguay, and Buenos Aires in 2007.

It was the last feature film for actor Brad Renfro before his death on January 15, 2008, at the age of 25. The film was dedicated to his memory.

An article published by Reuters described the story as "seven stories taking course during a week in the life of movie executives, rock stars, a vampire and other morally challenged characters", set in 1980s Los Angeles. The supernatural content was not to be included in the final film, however.

== Plot ==
In 1983, at an elegant Los Angeles party at a mansion, Bruce wanders away from the party and is killed by a speeding car. After the funeral, his friends Graham, Martin and Tim sit drinking with Raymond on a fancy hotel patio. Only Raymond is truly devastated and cries bitterly. The friends dismiss Raymond's tears. When Raymond leaves, Graham follows him.

Graham Sloan is the son of a rich, estranged couple and drives a Porsche, stays in glamorous hotel rooms, and is a drug dealer. His father William is a film producer with a pill-addled wife. William is having an affair with a local television anchorwoman, Cheryl Moore. His wife, meanwhile, is having sex with her son's friend Martin. Graham is aware that his girlfriend Christie is cheating on him with a number of men, including his best friend Martin, a bisexual rock video producer. Since Graham and Martin are also sleeping together, Graham appears to be trying to accept the open relationship.

A new wave rock singer named Bryan Metro flies into Los Angeles. He stumbles through his fancy hotel room and has sex with young groupies. Getting out of the bath, he slips on the wet floor and slashes open his hand. Upon answering the phone, he is berated by his manager for sleeping with underage groupies, and he mumbles that he needs a doctor. Later, he is taken to meet a film producer who hopes to make a profitable B-movie starring the singer. The singer appears barely coherent, and his attention is only caught when he sees a young girl wearing braces watching television in an adjoining room. Bryan staggers towards her and takes her into a bedroom. Later, he stumbles into a hotel room and finds a groupie in his bed. Slurring his words, he asks her to come closer, kisses her, and then punches her in the face.

Jack, a hotel doorman in Christie's place, has come to seek his fortune in Los Angeles as an actor. He is making a humble living working as a doorman and lives in a small, run-down house. He is alarmed when he receives a phone call from his grizzled uncle Peter, a drifter ex-con who claims he needs a place to stay. Jack angrily refuses the request, because he wants to leave the immoral, criminal side of his family background behind him. However, when Jack returns home, his uncle waits for him in a beaten-up van. To Jack's horror, his uncle is involved in a gangland kidnapping-for-hire plot, and the uncle has brought a kidnapped child to Jack's house. When a cleanly dressed, yet menacing gangster calls on Jack when the uncle is out and asks to collect the "package", Jack feigns ignorance. When the uncle returns he tells Jack that the boy has to be killed, on the grounds that it will be more humane than what the gangsters will do to him, Jack offers to kill the boy. Instead of slitting the boy's throat, Jack pretends to kill the boy but actually releases him. Jack hides his failure to kill the boy by cutting open his hand and smearing blood on his hands and face, and he joins his uncle in the van and flees the scene.

Tim Price is pressured to go with his father, Les, on a trip to Hawaii, ostensibly for the two to share father-son bonding time. They go to a bar, where Les starts a chat with two young women, who may be willing to have sex with them. However, Tim is not interested and is disgusted by his father's drunken, leering passes at the women. Tim does later find a girl he likes at the beach, but when the three of them have dinner together, Les begins to make passes at her and then both the father and the young woman make fun of Tim by suggesting that gay men were making passes at him on the beach. Tim leaves the dinner and goes out to be alone. When his father finds him, Tim refuses to talk, saying he has nothing to say.

Graham confronts Martin about Christie and asks Martin if he has been sleeping with her, apart from group sex. Martin denies betraying Graham and is shocked to realize that his friend has developed feelings for her; in their social scene, most interactions are fleeting couplings based on desire, not relationships based on caring. Graham then tells Martin that he feels adrift in his life as if he does not have anyone who can tell him what is right or wrong. His whole life has become a series of casual encounters and light banter, covered by a pharmaceutical haze. Graham seems to be making the first steps to moving away from his alienated, narcissistic lifestyle. When one of Martin's lovers calls Graham to tell him that Christie has become ill and is lying out on the sand, he drives over to the house to see her. Even though he sees that she has developed lesions, presumably AIDS-associated Kaposi's sarcoma, all over her dying body, he seems unable to take care of her and take her to a hospital. Instead, he kisses her once and leaves her lying on a towel on the beach dying, alone on an empty stretch of sand.

== Cast ==
- Billy Bob Thornton as William Sloan
- Kim Basinger as Laura Sloan
- Mickey Rourke as Peter
- Winona Ryder as Cheryl Moore
- Jon Foster as Graham Sloan
- Amber Heard as Christie
- Rhys Ifans as Roger
- Chris Isaak as Les Price
- Austin Nichols as Martin
- Lou Taylor Pucci as Tim Price
- Mel Raido as Bryan Metro
- Brad Renfro as Jack
- Theo Rossi as Spaz
- Cameron Goodman as Susan Sloan
- Aaron Himelstein as Raymond
- Jessica Stroup as Rachel
- Peter Scanavino as Leon
- Angela Sarafyan as Mary
- Simone Kessell as Nina Metro
- Katy Mixon as Patty
- Daniel Rosenberg as Rocko
- Diego Klattenhoff as Dirk Erickson

Brandon Routh was originally cast as Bruce, but is absent from the finished movie after a decision to excise all the "vampire scenes" from the film adaptation. Ashley Olsen was originally cast as Christie, but withdrew and was replaced by Heard.

== Production ==
Filming began on October 12, 2007, in Los Angeles, and later moved to Uruguay and Buenos Aires before wrapping on December 6, 2007.

"It's hard to tell now, but it was supposed to be like criminals and vampires and girls and young people... There were things I recognized, and a lot that I missed. But it's the director's version of the script, and that's just how it is."

— Bret Easton Ellis

According to Fox News, Ellis and Jarecki had spent three years working on a script and prepping the film for release, and Jarecki was set to direct. The film was supposed to be "an absurdist, lighthearted, and expansive satire." When producers replaced Jarecki with Australian director Gregor Jordan, the tone of the film strayed away from Ellis and Jarecki's original premise to become something that the cast and writers were embarrassed by. Amid concerns about the budget and about sex and violence (much like that of Ellis' earlier adaptation, American Psycho), the vampire subplot was excised from the movie entirely along with actor Brandon Routh, who played a vampire. Jordan's final version, which has received negative reviews from some critics, became "some terrible, dark meditation" under his interpretation of the script, according to an insider involved with the production. Jordan also reportedly cut the script down from Ellis' original 150 pages to only 94.

== Reception ==
=== Box office ===
The film premiered at Sundance Film Festival on January 22, 2009. It received a limited release on April 24, 2009, in 482 theatres in the United States, where it earned approximately US$300,000 on its opening weekend. The film was only in release for three days and the final gross for the film was $382,174, against a $18 million budget. The film was then released on DVD & Blu-ray on August 25, 2009. It was granted a 15 certificate by the British Board of Film Classification (BBFC) and was released under four different versions.

=== Critical response ===
The Informers was panned by film critics and has a "rotten" score of 13% on Rotten Tomatoes based on 104 reviews with an average rating of 3.8 out of 10. The critical consensus states: "As miserable and insipid as its protagonists, The Informers fails to provide anything to think about after the sheen of fake blond is gone." The film also has a score of 20 out of 100 on Metacritic, based on 25 critics, indicating "generally unfavorable reviews".

Sonny Bunch from the Washington Times stated that to understand the film, a viewer should "[i]magine American Psycho with less violence but more nudity, transplanted from New York City to California and stripped of all self-awareness". John Anderson from the Washington Post called it a "... nihilistic, narcissistic, knuckleheaded movie about nihilistic, narcissistic knuckleheads"; he states that it "...might have been an interesting exercise in satire, if it only had a sense of humor. Which it doesn't".

Owen Gleiberman from Entertainment Weekly stated that the film is "...by far the most slack, ho-hum movie ever made from Ellis' material". Cosmo Landesman from The Sunday Times commented, "It has a good cast and a terrific 1980s soundtrack (Devo, Simple Minds)". At the same time, Landesman stated that the film "...also has the superficiality of a TV soap", which means that while the film "...is not so bad that you can't sit back and enjoy it, but nor is it good enough to go and see". Several critics attacked the film for its prurient elements. James Berardinelli from ReelViews called it "... the kind of movie that, upon leaving the theater, provokes the urge to take a shower".

Several critics pinned the blame for the problems on the director. Critic Nigel Andrews from the Financial Times acknowledges that "Bret Easton Ellis pens a mean tale, in all adjectival senses. His prose is artfully maleficent; he is a laid-back Severus Snape of the sex-and-drugs generation." However, he argues that "[y]ou need a smarter directing hand, though, than Gregor Jordan's" to make the film work. Reviewer Anthony Quinn from The Independent argues that Jordan "...seems to have gone into reverse since his 2001 Buffalo Soldiers, aiming for the LA rondeau of Altman's Short Cuts but missing all the vital ingredients – wit, humanity, charm, nuance and meaning."

Some of the few positive reviewers interpreted the aimless, emptiness of the film as an intentional way of bringing out the themes of Ellis' short stories. Rob Nelson from Variety stated that "[r]ating less than zero on the sophistication scale, The Informers is thus a totally faithful adaptation of Bret Easton Ellis' novel — and an accurate look at early '80s-era Los Angeles". Another positive review came from Derek Malcolm from This is London, who stated "Jordan gives all this an entirely appropriate sheen and the cast play well through glazed eyes." Malcolm claims that the "...film will fascinate those who love to see the tormented lives of those who seem luckier than the rest of us". Erica Abeel from Film Journal International stated that "Gregor Jordan and Bret Easton Ellis take no prisoners in this uncompromising, expertly crafted shocker about hedonism in early-'80s L.A."

Roger Ebert gave the film two and a half stars, concluding that the film is "repulsively fascinating and has been directed by Gregor Jordan as a soap opera from hell, with good sets and costumes."

Ellis has said, "That movie doesn't work for a lot of reasons but I don't think any of those reasons are my fault."
