= Glamorama =

1998 novel by Bret Easton Ellis

- First edition
- Author: Bret Easton Ellis
- Cover artist: Chip Kidd (designer)
- Language: English
- Genre: Satire, Conspiracy thriller, Literary Fiction
- Publisher: Knopf
- Publication date: December 29, 1998
- Publication place: US
- Media type: Print (hardcover)
- Pages: 546
- ISBN: 0-375-40412-0
- OCLC: 39534365
- Dewey Decimal: 813/.54 21
- LC Class: PS3555.L5937 G58 1999

Glamorama is a 1998 novel by American writer Bret Easton Ellis. Glamorama is set in, and satirizes, the 1990s, specifically celebrity culture and consumerism. Time describes the novel as "a screed against models and celebrity".

== Development ==
Ellis wanted to write a Stephen King-style ghost story novel, which would eventually become Lunar Park; finding it difficult at the time, he began work on the other novel which he had in mind. This was a Robert Ludlum-style thriller, with the intention of using one of his own vapid characters who lack insight as the narrator.

Ellis composed the book between December 1989 and December 1997.

== Plot summary ==
In the first section of the novel, male model Victor Ward is involved in opening a club in New York City owned by Damien Nutchs Ross. Victor is cheating on his model girlfriend Chloe Byrnes with Alison Poole, Damien's girlfriend. Victor obsesses over the celebrity seating plan for the dinner on the club's opening night and struggles to find a DJ, while poorly attempting to cover up his affair with Alison and his plans to open another club behind Damien's back. Victor appears to suffer from memory loss, which he blames on Klonopin, and is often sighted in two places at once.

Victor also reconnects with Lauren Hynde, who he dated at Camden, a fictionalised version of Bennington College. The club's opening night ends in disaster. A photo of Victor and Lauren kissing — which Victor believes is altered — makes the news, causing chaos. Victor is also beaten up by actor Hurley Thompson, due to Victor earlier leaking rumours about Hurley to the press in exchange for not publishing an "embarrassing" photo of Victor and Alison.

After Chloe breaks things off with him, Victor is contacted by the mysterious F. Fred Palakon. Palakon offers Victor $300,000 to travel to London and bring back Jamie Fields, a girl who Victor knew at Camden. Victor accepts despite having only vague memories of Jamie.

Victor travels to London on the QE2 cruise ship. From this point onwards, Victor describes being followed by a camera crew and instructed to follow a script; however, he frequently becomes agitated when he believes others are not following the script and that some scenes are not filmed. On the ship, Victor meets Marina and intends to follow her to Paris. However, Marina mysteriously disappears and Victor ends up in London.

Victor quickly finds Jamie, who is filming a movie. Victor stays with Jamie's friends — Tammy, Bruce and Bentley — in Notting Hill, led by hyper-successful male model Bobby Hughes. Bobby instructs Victor to bring home Sam Ho, the son of the Korean ambassador. Victor walks in on Sam being brutally murdered in the house's basement gym. Bobby explains that Victor cannot leave, since Bobby has created altered photographs incriminating Victor in Sam's murder.

Victor is forced to participate in Bobby's project, which involves planting bombs in London and Paris, killing civilians and passing the blame onto other groups. Bobby explains he recruits models because they don't draw suspicion and they are used to being told what to do. Bobby also shows Victor "PhotoSoap for Windows 95", the software he uses to alter photographs. Victor is distressed, especially after witnessing Tammy's suicide, and wants to leave. Victor becomes increasingly confused over the role of Palakon, not knowing whether various photographs are real or altered. Palakon may already know Bobby, and may also be involved with Victor's father, a US senator who wants Victor out of the way to avoid bad press. Many of Victor's associates in New York believe they still frequently see him around there.

Victor returns to Bobby's house, where he witnesses the deaths of Bentley and Jamie. Jamie suggests everything is part of a larger conspiracy with "the Japanese"; that Bobby, Palakon and Victor's father are all working together and against each other; and that Victor has accidentally given Bobby a formula for a new plastic explosive concealed in Lauren Hynde's hat, which Victor brought on the cruise ship. Jamie suggests Lauren Hynde is actually dead, and that she is not really Jamie Fields.

Victor meets Chloe in a hotel. Chloe claims to have seen Bruce, who Victor thought was dead. After drinking poisoned wine meant for Victor, Chloe dies gruesomely. Still believing he is being filmed, Victor manages to shoot Bobby, although Victor is unsuccessful in stopping another aeroplane bomb. Victor returns to New York and begins attending law school.

In the last section, Victor is taken to Milan under the guise of filming, seemingly with the same potentially-hallucinatory crew as before. Interspersed with flashbacks from Victor's Camden days, Victor appears to have a breakdown in Italy. He phones his sister in Washington D.C., who claims Victor is right beside her; the other Victor even speaks to Victor on the phone. In a flashback, Chloe tells Victor that if he wants to know how this ends, he has to buy the rights.

== Literary devices, plot, and themes ==
The novel is a satire of modern celebrity culture; this is reflected in its premise, which features models-turned-terrorists. A character remarks, "basically, everyone was a sociopath ... and all the girls' hair was chignoned." The novel plays upon the conspiracy thriller conceit of someone "behind all the awful events", to dramatize the revelation of a world of random horror. The lack of resolution contributes to Ellis' artistic effect. The obsession with beauty is reflected in consistent namedropping; this satirizes (the main character) Victor's obsession with looks, and perhaps is indicative of the author's own attraction to glamor.

Ellis drops names in Glamorama so often that Entertainment Weekly describes "Nary a sentence ... escapes without a cameo from someone famous, quasi-famous, or formerly famous. In fact, in some sentences, Ellis cuts out those pesky nouns and verbs and simply lists celebrities." Namedropping and commoditization have a depersonalizing effect (a world reduced to "sheen and brands"); as the reviewer for The Harvard Crimson observes, "When Victor undergoes a transformation to a law student, we know he is different because he now wears a Brooks Brothers suit and drinks Diet Coke. London and Paris become nothing more than a different collection of recognizable proper nouns (Notting Hill and Irvine Welsh in the first case; Chez Georges and Yves Saint Laurent in the second)." A writer for the New York Times observes "much of his prose consists of (intentionally) numbingly long lists of his characters' clothes and accouterments ... out of which his loft-dwellers somewhat hopefully attempt to assemble something like an identity". In speech, his writing demonstrates the ways in which his characters, too, have internalized the language of consumerist advertising and marketing. According to the Lakeland Ledger, Glamorama is something of a Through the Looking-Glass allegory and a cautionary tale navigating the perils of dissolving identity.

In parody of how people now think in modern terms, Ellis "annoying[ly]" lists "the songs that are playing in the background, or even quoting them, as he does with Oasis' "Champagne Supernova"; in effect, the novel is provided with a movie soundtrack. As such, the book feels at times like a movie, and sometimes more specifically, a snuff film. New technology such as photo manipulation software (e.g. "PhotoSoap for Windows 95") are featured in the novel. This creates an ironic situation in which Victor, the character obsessed by appearances, is haunted by fake images that appear real which implicate him in a murder; it becomes hard to tell what is real in the 'modern' world. As such, "meaningful identity is obliterated"; this furthers the recurring joke from American Psycho wherein "characters are always getting confused by their friends with other people, with no noticeable consequences".

The book prominently features a conceit wherein Victor's life is being filmed by a camera crew "introduced a third of the way into the book". As well as a postmodern device to examine the questionable "reality" of the situation, it also functions as a "tidy commentary" on the advent of mass surveillance in the 1990s. EW interprets the scene to mean "Modern life has become a movie (a point made more cogently by Neal Gabler's new book, Life the Movie)." The Pittsburgh Post-Gazette took the same meaning from the conceit, and described it as a "not-so-deep observation" that "has no real pay-off". The New York Times felt it was a "halfhearted narrative device ... suggesting that the novel's action is actually part of a film that's being made." The reviewer felt that allusions to "the director" or to the fact that this or that scene is a "flashback" was used to retroactively suggest cohesion in the novel's plot.

"As much as celebrity itself, our collective celebrity worship becomes the real target of Ellis' satire", writes the Star Tribune. Models in the novel act as a synecdoche of the larger culture. Reviewer Eric Hanson writes, "Their [models'] selfishness and brutality, he implies, are simply an extreme manifestation of what consumer culture encourages in everyone." Victor's own pursuit of being cool or too hip "destroys him". A CNN reviewer gives the example of Victor not wanting to explain his impersonator, "because the places he was seen were always hot spots he should have frequented."

== Characters ==
Victor Ward is the novel's lead character, who had previously appeared as Victor Johnson in The Rules of Attraction (1987). In Glamorama, now an "A-list model, would-be-actor and current "It boy", "an uberstereotype of the male model", Victor lives by his catchphrase mantra "the better you look, the more you see". As Harvard Crimson observes, "His lifestyle is the extreme of everything the current culture worships: he can't avoid thinking in brand names and image and speaks with lines from pop songs." Uncharacteristic for an Ellis protagonist, as the Crimson notes, Victor is "terrified by" the "coldbloodedness" he encounters when he becomes embroiled in international terrorism. As an unintelligent narrator, Victor (through his inability to comprehend his situation), underlines how "the world of celebrity in Glamorama is inescapable". Compared to other Ellis protagonists, Victor is less "sensitive and insightful" than Less than Zero's Clay, neither the "preening psychopath" that is American Psycho's Patrick Bateman", he is nevertheless an "[un]sympathetic protagonist (in his own way, he's as morally bankrupt as ... Patrick Bateman)." As narrator, "Victor's perceptions" sum up "[the glamor world's] disconnection from what the rest of us consider "real life"... [where] Everything he sees is a brand name". CNN speculates when Victor begins speaking to the novel's "film crew" (one of its literary devices), that this could mean that the character is schizophrenic. Victor comes across "oddly homophobic for a member of the pansexual New York fashion scene"; when his gay assistant accuses "I know for a fact you've had sex with guys in the past", he retorts that he did "the whole hip bi thing for about three hours back in college".

The mysterious F. Fred Palakon first appears a quarter of the way into the novel, when he offers to pay Victor $300,000 to track down his former Camden classmate Jamie Fields, a double-agent working in the terrorist organisation with which Victor becomes involved. It is never clarified exactly which political organisation Palakon appears to be working for; he even appears alongside Senator Johnson, Victor's father, a United States senator with ambitions to become President. Of Palakon, 'the director' says "We've been through this a hundred times ... There is no Palakon. I've never heard that name. Victor's girlfriend Chloe Byrnes is a supermodel and a recovering drug addict. Alison Poole, the main character from Jay McInerney's 1988 novel Story of My Life, appears, having also previously appeared in American Psycho in 1992. In Glamorama, Alison is "[Victor's] boss's girlfriend (another supermodel)", "here playing Lewinsky". Bobby Hughes is a successful male model and the leader of his international terrorist group. Victor engages in a bisexual threesome with him and with Jamie Fields. Lauren Hynde from The Rules of Attraction also reappears, having become a successful actress with ties to Hughes' terrorist organisation; other Rules characters appear (e.g., in flashback) such as Bertrand Ripleis, who is now a terrorist also.

== Adaptations ==
In 1999, the contemporary Italian composer Lorenzo Ferrero wrote a composition for chamber ensemble entitled Glamorama Spies, which was inspired by the novel.

In Glamorama by Bret Easton Ellis, the main character is constantly spied on and, even before his consciousness becomes aware of it, he is constantly in an anxious state. Anxiolytics and some romantic intervals are not enough to stop the sensation that he's always late for something and that he's progressively losing his sense of reality. I was reading the book when Sentieri Selvaggi asked me for this piece and going from reading to writing seemed almost inevitable. Therefore, if at times you feel some hints at emotion, think about the second to last sentence of the book: "The stars are real."

— Lorenzo Ferrero

Glitterati is a 2004 film directed by Roger Avary assembled from the 70 hours of video footage shot for the European sequence of The Rules of Attraction. It expands upon the minimally detailed and rapidly recapped story told by Victor Ward, portrayed by Kip Pardue, upon his return to the United States after having travelled extensively around Europe. In regard to expanding upon those events, the film acts as a connecting bridge between The Rules of Attraction and the upcoming film adaptation set to be directed by Avary. Avary has called Glitterati a "pencil sketch of what will ultimately be the oil painting of Glamorama".

In 2009, Audible.com produced an audio version of Glamorama, narrated by Jonathan Davis, as part of its Modern Vanguard line of audiobooks.

In 2010, when a film adaptation of Glamorama was mentioned in an interview with Movieline.com, Bret Easton Ellis commented, "I think the days of being able to make that movie are over." From the same interview, Ellis mentioned that an idea for a mini-series adaptation was brought forth to HBO though it was ultimately declined and further stating the movie would be left in Roger Avary's hands if one was to be made.

On October 13, 2011, Bret Easton Ellis reported on Twitter the following:

Just finished reading Roger Avary's adaptation of "Glamorama" which he will direct next year. Hilarious, horrific, sad. He's a mad genius.

=== Zoolander controversy ===
Fans have noted similarities to the 2001 Ben Stiller comedy Zoolander. Ellis stated that he is aware of the similarities, and went on to say that he attempted to take legal action. Asked about the similarities in a 2005 BBC interview, Ellis said that he was unable to discuss them under the terms of an out-of-court settlement.

== Reception ==
Much criticism of the novel noted its length. Time's Joel Stein noted "The idea—models so solipsistic that they become terrorists—is a good-enough one for a short story of 15 pages, but it's unsustainable at 482." He describes the book's first 185 pages as "inanely repetitive". Entertainment Weekly opines "It's like reading Page Six of the New York Post, but for 482 pages." One reviewer found the opening scenes "funny enough" although noted that it "gets tired easily". Contrarily, the Star Tribune felt "the satiric early half is Ellis in peak form, the thriller-style second half is less successful." In fact, the humor in the novel was praised by multiple critics. The Star Tribune notes Victor's lack of depth, malapropisms, overuse of the word "baby" and the novel's "enchantingly disaffected monotone" of "a been-there-done-that Valleyspeak". Hanson felt that the horror elements in the "labyrinthine" thriller section of the novel seemed "recycled from American Psycho." Entertainment Weekly also state their preference for the "first 189 pages". Contrarily, the New York Times felt that the book was devoid of fun, where even the blackest satire (e.g. Evelyn Waugh's The Loved One) are more humorous.

EW places Glamorama within an emerging tradition of celebrity satire, noting "the glitterati are the satirical target du jour, what with Woody Allen's limp, oral-sex-filled film Celebrity, and Jay McInerney's clever novel Model Behavior" (both 1998). McInerney (a friend of Ellis) noted the novel's comparative darkness to his own Model Behaviour (also about 90s nightlife and supermodels), published the same year, saying "I deliberately wrote a comic novel because you don't go chasing butterflies with sledgehammers". (Regarding McInerney's novel, Stein had felt that the novelist's attempt at a zeitgeist novel was one "looking at the '90s through an '80s lens".) Harvard Crimson noted, similar to McInerney, that "Celebrity by itself teeters so often into self-parody that it seems too easy to bash it" but remarks that "Fortunately, Ellis does more than that injecting Glamorama with a sharper plot than those of earlier novels, a plot which kicks in about a quarter of the way into the novel." The New York Times question the choice of subject matter as well: "Ellis's satirical message is, essentially, a one-liner, and hardly an original one at that – celebrity culture is vapid, yes, and?" The reviewer furthermore suggested "Glamorama is itself just another artifact of the culture it pretends to criticize."

The book's style is summarized by one reviewer as "a book that reads like a movie", and another notes that Ellis' writing "can be sharp", and succeeds in creating a "creepy sense of dread about our culture". On its influence, Time felt that the novel's "contribution" to the world comes in Victor's catchphrase, which they describe as Tom Wolfean. In an otherwise damning review, the New York Times commented "[Ellis] has an uncannily keen eye for the tiny details of the lives of the abel-obsessed yuppies and would-be celebs he's sending up". A CNN reviewer felt, upon reading the book, that "Bret Easton Ellis is a gifted writer"; he praised his "unflinching eye" in capturing the details of "the ensemble worn by a notorious clothes horse, or the grisly aftermath of a hotel bombing, or the graphic details of a menage a trois [sic]." The world Ellis evokes, through the eyes of the male model, Harvard Crimson notes is one "where no one has any emotions beyond the visceral response, where all the sex scenes are described in purely pornographic terms."

A.J. Jacobs of Entertainment Weekly did not enjoy the book's more "meta" conceits, and gives the novel a 'C'. Daniel Mendelsohn of the New York Times opines derisively that "Like its predecessors, Glamorama is meant to be a withering report on the soul-destroying emptiness of late-century American consumer culture, chichi downtown division; but the only lesson you're likely to take away from it is the even more depressing classic American morality tale about how premature stardom is more of a curse than a blessing for young writers." The CNN reviewer concludes that "in the end, Glamorama is less than the sum of its parts".

Ellis himself has claimed that, as of 2018, the novel has failed to break even for its US publisher, Knopf.
