= Lunar Park =

2005 mock memoir by Bret Easton Ellis

- Cover of Lunar Park
- Author: Bret Easton Ellis
- Cover artist: Chip Kidd (designer)
- Language: English
- Genre: Literary fiction, horror, metafiction, autofiction
- Publisher: Knopf
- Publication date: August 16, 2005
- Publication place: United States
- Media type: Print (Hardcover)
- Pages: 320
- ISBN: 0-375-41291-3
- OCLC: 57549743
- Dewey Decimal: 813/.54 22
- LC Class: PS3555.L5937 L86 2005

Lunar Park is a metafictional novel by American writer Bret Easton Ellis, presented as a mock memoir. It was released by Knopf in 2005. It was the first book written by Ellis to use past tense narrative.

== Plot summary ==
The novel begins with an inflated and parodic but reasonably accurate portrayal of Ellis's early fame. It details incidents of his rampant drug use and his publicly humiliating book tours to promote Glamorama. The novel dissolves into fiction as Ellis describes a liaison with an actress named Jayne Dennis, whom he later marries, and with whom he conceives a child. From this point, the fictional Ellis' life reflects the real writer's only in some descriptions of the past and possibly in his general sentiments.

Ellis and Jayne move to fictional Midland, an affluent suburban town outside New York City, which they no longer consider safe due to pervasive terrorist acts in a post-9/11 America. Fictional incidents include suicide bombings in Wal-Marts and a dirty bomb detonated in Florida. Strange incidents start happening on a Halloween night, some involving a doll belonging to Ellis's fictional stepdaughter Sarah.

As the novel continues, the haunting of Ellis's house and questions over the death of his father become increasingly prominent. At various points, characters and events from Ellis's novels appear to intersect his real life, although he is unaware of this thin veil between his reality and his fiction. With his history of drug use and alcoholism, his wife, children and housekeeper are skeptical of his claims that the house is haunted. Unfolding events only very gradually reveal a much more complicated situation than a simple haunting. There is a dynamic interplay between the author's dead father, the house itself and specific negative associations buried within the author's own subconscious mind. Added to all of this is the very late-breaking and almost gratuitous insinuation that Robby, the narrator's young son, may somehow be at the epicenter of all these events.

== Characters ==
Several of the characters are fictionalized portrayals of real people. Most notable among these is Ellis himself, but others include friend and fellow author Jay McInerney and Ellis's late father.

- Bret Easton Ellis – Novelist who rose to fame while still at college with his debut novel Less than Zero; now lives in the suburbs with old flame Jayne Dennis. There are considerable differences between this Ellis and the author himself, although there are also crucial similarities. The fictional Bret attended Camden College, the fictional liberal arts college which recurs in his novels.
- Jayne Dennis – Fictional film star, married to Bret Easton Ellis. Said to have dated many men, including Q-Tip and Keanu Reeves amongst others. As part of the marketing campaign a website was created, www.jaynedennis.com, consisting of doctored images and a fictional filmography. Some of the pictures of Dennis on the stills page are of actress Cynthia Gibb. It is noted in a disclaimer on the stills page that the site is a work of fiction.
- Robby – Bret and Jayne's eleven-year-old son.
- Sarah – Jayne's six-year-old daughter and Bret's stepdaughter.
- Robert Ellis – Bret's father, deceased.
- Patrick Bateman – Supposed serial killer from American Psycho. Rumored to be responsible for murders in the local suburbia. Toward the novel's end, Ellis writes the last Bateman story as a way of finally confronting and controlling the character. Bateman, for all intents and purposes, dies in a fire on a boat dock.
- Donald Kimball – Detective from American Psycho. Questions Ellis about the aforementioned Bateman-inspired murders. Kimball appears to be an example of Bret's fictional world crossing over with his "real" world, one which Bret does not pick up on. Later, Bret discovers the name to be an alias.
- Mitchell Allen – Mitchell Allen is Bret's neighbour, and is a minor character from The Rules of Attraction. Bret remembers going to college with him at Camden, and even remembers details of Mitchell's alleged affair with fictional character Paul Denton. The narrator doesn't seem aware of this crossover between fiction and reality. The author has commented that he is "not quite sure how [Mitchell] ended up on Elsinore Lane or why I put him there" but also adds that "maybe I found Mitchell Allen pretty amusing in The Rules of Attraction and as a private joke that would only mean something to me decided to place him next door to the narrator of Lunar Park." Introducing the character allowed Ellis to "riff on Camden College... and men of a certain age."
- Clayton – College student who Bret notices strikingly resembles Patrick Bateman, a young Bret, and in name resembles Clay from Less than Zero.
- Aimee Light – A graduate student writing her thesis on Bret.
- Jay McInerney – Easton's contemporary and friend; author of Bright Lights, Big City

== Development ==
Ellis finished writing the novel in the summer of 2004. Ellis said the book was an homage to Stephen King and the comic books he loved as a child.

Ellis told the Manchester Evening News that the Terby "is based on a Furby but also there was this bird-like doll that my older sister had and I wrote a short story about it when I was 7 or 8. She used to scare me with it, I'd go to my bedroom and get into bed and it'd be there, she'd hide it there just to scare me. Or I'd be walking up the stairs and she'd chase me with it. And I think that's what I was channelling and it fitted in to all the other things that I was haunted by." The revelation that "Terby" is in fact "Y Bret" ("Why, Bret?") spelled backwards is an homage to the "redrum" (murder spelled backwards) plot device in King's The Shining.

The book carries an epigraph from Hamlet 1.v.98. This connects with the theme of haunting by a father as well as the names in the book (e.g. Elsinore, Osric, Fortinbras).

== Reception ==
The novel was nominated for a World Fantasy Award in the Best Novel category in 2004.

== Cultural impact ==
- In 2007, the English progressive rock band Porcupine Tree released Fear of a Blank Planet, which was influenced by Lunar Park.
