= The Rules of Attraction (film) =

2002 film by Roger Avary

- Theatrical release poster
- Directed by: Roger Avary
- Screenplay by: Roger Avary
- Based on: The Rules of Attraction by Bret Easton Ellis
- Produced by: Greg Shapiro
- Starring: James Van Der Beek; Shannyn Sossamon; Kip Pardue; Jessica Biel; Ian Somerhalder; Clifton Collins, Jr.; Thomas Ian Nicholas; Swoosie Kurtz; Faye Dunaway
- Cinematography: Robert Brinkmann
- Edited by: Sharon Rutter
- Music by: tomandandy
- Production companies: Kingsgate Films; Roger Avary Filmproduktion GmbH
- Distributed by: Lions Gate Films (United States); Concorde Filmverleih (Germany)
- Release dates: October 11, 2002 (United States); May 1, 2003 (Germany)
- Running time: 110 minutes
- Countries: United States; Germany
- Language: English
- Budget: $4 million
- Box office: $11.8 million

The Rules of Attraction is a 2002 dark comedy film written and directed by Roger Avary, based on Bret Easton Ellis's 1987 novel. The story follows three Camden College students who become entangled in a love triangle; a drug dealer, a virgin, and a bisexual classmate. It stars James Van Der Beek, Shannyn Sossamon, Ian Somerhalder, Jessica Biel, Kate Bosworth, Kip Pardue, and Joel Michaely.

The Rules of Attraction was released on October 11, 2002. It grossed $11.8 million worldwide, against a budget of $4 million. Though it received mixed reviews from critics upon its release, it has since been considered a cult classic.

== Plot ==
At Camden College in New Hampshire, students Lauren Hynde, Paul Denton, and Sean Bateman give apathetic interior monologues on their lives and briefly exchange glances with one another. Lauren, previously a virgin, takes a film student upstairs to have sex and passes out; she wakes to find herself being raped by a townie while the film student records it. Lauren then reflects on how she had planned to lose her virginity to Victor, her now ex-boyfriend. Meanwhile, Paul, who is bisexual, tries to have sex with a jock, only to be bashed when the jock, deeply in the closet, rejects his advances. A bruised and beaten Sean is shown drinking a whole bottle of Jack Daniel's, tearing up a series of purple letters, before approaching and having sex with a blonde girl at the party.

Several months earlier at the beginning of the school year, there is a love triangle between Lauren, Paul, and Sean. Misinterpreting Sean's willingness to spend time with him, Paul makes several advances, to which Sean is oblivious. Paul fantasizes about having sex with Sean while masturbating. Concurrently, Lauren also finds herself attracted to Sean despite saving her virginity for her traveling boyfriend, Victor. Sean reciprocates her feelings, and assumes the anonymous, purple love letters he has started receiving are from Lauren. Sean masturbates while reading these letters and fantasizes about Lauren.

While Paul is visiting his friend "Dick", Sean, under the influence of psychedelic mushrooms, has sex with Lauren's roommate Lara at the "Dress to Get Fucked" party. Sean regrets it immediately, and realizes he is in love with Lauren. It is then revealed that another, unnamed cafeteria girl is the author of Sean's love letters; after seeing him leave the party with Lara, she sends him a suicide note before slashing her wrists in the dorm bathtub. Lauren, finding Sean with Lara, runs to the girls' bathroom in tears, only to find the unnamed girl's body, leaving Lauren extremely distressed. Sean, still believing Lauren wrote the purple letters, misinterprets the unnamed girl's suicide note and assumes Lauren never wants to be with him. Lauren decides to lose her virginity to her art history professor Lance Lawson. Lawson tells her he is a married man, but a blow job will not do her marks any harm.

After numerous suicide attempts, Sean fakes his death and, unaware that Lauren recently found a corpse, unintentionally upsets her further when she finds him pretending to be dead. After stealing drugs from dealer Rupert, Sean tries to speak to Lauren again, asking only to know her. Lauren tells Sean he will never know her and abandons him. She approaches Victor, who has finally returned to Camden College, only to find that Victor is having sex with Lara and does not remember who Lauren is, leaving her completely distraught.

Paul, upon finding a drunk Sean, tries to talk to him, parroting Sean's own words by saying he merely wants to know him. Sean coldly rejects him, using Lauren's words to say that Paul will never know him. Paul throws a snowball at Sean, then angrily runs off in tears. Sean checks his campus mailbox in vain, only to find that the love notes have stopped. He is then cornered by Rupert and his Jamaican partner and brutally beaten.

The three protagonists then attend the "End of the World" party and the plot returns to the introduction. After seeing Lauren heading upstairs with the film student, Sean finally accepts he cannot be with her, and tears up the purple letters he believes to be from her. It is then revealed that rather than having sex with the blonde girl as he does in the intro, Sean has an epiphany, reconsiders and instead leaves his drink and exits. Paul and Lauren meet on the house porch and reflect on the recent events, as well as on Sean, whom they watch depart on his motorcycle. Sean begins narrating his final thoughts only for them to end prematurely as the film cuts to the end credits, which are run backwards.

== Cast ==
- James Van Der Beek as Sean Bateman, a drug dealer from Berlin, New Hampshire (the character is the younger brother of Patrick Bateman, the main character of American Psycho)
- Shannyn Sossamon as Lauren Hynde, a virgin who is saving herself for Victor, her ex-boyfriend
- Ian Somerhalder as Paul Denton, Lauren's bisexual ex-boyfriend
- Jessica Biel as Lara Holleran, Lauren's promiscuous roommate
- Kate Bosworth as Kelly, a girl from the party whom Sean takes back to his room
- Kip Pardue as Victor Johnson, Lauren's promiscuous ex-boyfriend
- Clifton Collins, Jr. as Rupert Guest, a high-strung drug dealer
- Thomas Ian Nicholas as Mitchell Allen, a weaselly cohort who seems to idolize brutish Victor
- Faye Dunaway as Mrs. Eve Denton, Paul's mother
- Eric Stoltz as Mr. Lance Lawson, a college instructor who seduces Lauren
- Fred Savage as Marc, a heroin-addicted student who owes Sean money for drugs
- Theresa Wayman as Food Service Girl
- Jay Baruchel as Harry, a "friend" of Paul's
- Joel Michaely as Raymond, a student
- Clare Kramer as Candice, a student and party girl
- Russell Sams as Richard "Dick" Jared, an old friend of Paul's
- Swoosie Kurtz as Mimi Jared, Richard's uptight mother
- Ron Jeremy as the Piano Player
- Paul Williams as Duty Doctor
- Casper Van Dien as Patrick Bateman (scenes filmed but were not included in the final cut)

== Production ==
The film was shot at the University of Redlands in California.

The film was one of the first studio motion pictures to be edited using Final Cut Pro. Using a beta version of FCP 3, it demonstrated to the film industry that successful 3:2 pulldown matchback to 24fps could be achieved with an off-the-shelf product. Roger Avary, the film's director, became a spokesperson for FCP, appearing in print ads worldwide.

Avary stated that his goal was to create "an arthouse film for teenagers". As a college student, Avary wrote the screenplay without acquiring the rights to the book first, stating he did so because the book reminded him of the people who surrounded him as a student. 15 years later, he was reminded of this and decided to finally start work on the project again and rewrote the screenplay. He included certain elements not meant to be featured in screenplays, such as camera movement as well as what kind of motion control equipment he would use. Shot in 2001, Avary stated that he would make the film "as if [he] was a first-time filmmaker" and highlighted Ellis' "Faulknerian storytelling mode" as the core reason for adapting the story.

Budget constraints meant Avary had to finance the filming of Victor's European trip himself. He followed actor Kip Pardue around various countries with a handheld camera, filming him 24/7 with the actor remaining in character from the moment he stepped on the plane departing the US.

== Music ==
Much of the source music and score is by the duo of Andy Milburn and Tom Hadju, collectively known as tomandandy. Additional songs that are in the film are from the era in which the book takes place, including The Cure, Love and Rockets, Public Image Ltd., Blondie, The Go-Go's, Yazoo, and Erasure. The film also includes songs by The Rapture, Milla Jovovich, Der Wolf, and Serge Gainsbourg.

=== Mono SR ===
The Mono SR simplified noise reduction format for cinema was developed by Tomandandy for the film in 2001–2002. It is an open-source audio format that maintains the simplicity of monaural sound when motion picture delivery requirements include Dolby Digital noise reduction.

== Releases and versions ==
Multiple versions of the film exist, as cuts were made so it could receive less restrictive ratings in the United States and other areas.

Lions Gate Films originally received an NC-17 rating from the MPAA, but director Avary made cuts to the film in order to achieve an R rating, for "strong sexual content, drug use, language, and violent images".

The Australian version of the film is uncut, retaining 22 seconds that were removed in the R-rated US version.

The French two-disc Special Edition entitled Les Lois de L'Attraction is the longest known version available. It contains a small number of scenes not shown in the US and UK DVDs and also includes more footage of the suicide scene (including the girl actually cutting into her wrists, instead of just seeing her reaction). It also includes more content in commentary tracks than the other DVDs available.

The uncut version was shown at UK cinemas. However, the BBFC ordered edits for the suicide scene for the home video release, even as the film retained the highest (18+) rating. The BBFC later wrote that "the wider availability of video – including to younger viewers – and the opportunity to replay scenes over and over again, increased the concern to a level which justified the Board's intervention".

The home release of the film was supposed to include a commentary from Bret Easton Ellis. The author recalled on his podcast how he had been up late doing drugs the night before the recording session and had forgotten about it. He attended the session anyway, but gave a rambling commentary that was unusable.

== Reception ==
=== Critical reception ===
On the review aggregator website Rotten Tomatoes, 45% of 142 critics' reviews are positive, with an average rating of 5.5/10. The website's consensus reads: "A tiresome movie about unsympathetic college kids engaging in self-destructive behaviors." Metacritic, which uses a weighted average, assigned the film a score of 50 out of 100, based on 30 critics, indicating "mixed or average" reviews.

According to Stephen Holden of The New York Times, "if The Rules of Attraction,...is a much more faithful novel-to-screen adaptation than American Psycho, its reverence for its source proves to be its biggest problem. Where Mary Harron re-invented American Psycho as an elegant comic horror film, Roger Avary, who wrote and directed The Rules of Attraction, dives headlong into the depravity roiling in the student body of the fictional Camden College. Where Ms. Harron shrewdly created a surreal, high-styled ambiance for Mr. Ellis's monstrous humanoids to rattle around in, Mr. Avary wants to convince us that his movie's dissipated symbols of late capitalist excess really exist. The harder the movie tries to shock, the shriller it rings." Richard Corliss characterized the film as a "frenetically chic look at a daisy chain of collegiate craving...Sex, drugs and rack 'n' ruin; pretty people doing nasty things to one another...honestly, what more could you want in a movie?".

Roger Ebert described the film as a "skillfully made movie about reprehensible people", giving it two out of four stars. Regarding the main characters, he stated "...by the end, I felt a sad indifference. These characters are not from life and do not form into useful fiction. Their excesses of sex and substance abuse are physically unwise, financially unlikely, and emotionally impossible. I do not censor their behavior but lament the movie's fascination with it." Ebert concluded his review by saying: "The inhabitants of The Rules of Attraction are superficial and transparent. We know people like that, and hope they will get better."

=== Author's reception ===
Bret Easton Ellis spoke positively of the film in 2010 when speaking of film adaptations of his writing, stating: "My favorite movie out of the four was The Rules of Attraction. I thought it was the only one that captured the sensibility of the novel in a cinematic way. I know I'm sounding like a film critic on that, but I'm talking about that in an emotional way—as the writer of the novel. I watched that movie and thought they got it in a way that Mary Harron [director of American Psycho] didn't and Less than Zero didn't."

=== Box office ===
The film grossed $11,819,244 worldwide on a budget of $4 million, thus making the film a minor box office success.

=== Awards ===
At the 14th GLAAD Media Awards, the film was nominated for Best Film—Wide Release by the Gay & Lesbian Alliance Against Defamation, losing to The Hours.

=== Cult following ===
Though the film received a mixed critical reaction upon its release in 2002, it has since been referred to as a cult classic and was covered by The A.V. Club for their "New Cult Canon" feature. In 2012, Entertainment Weekly cited the film as one of the "50 Best Movies You've Never Seen". In an April 2009 interview, author Ellis stated that the film adaptation of The Rules of Attraction came closest of all the movies based on his books to capturing his sensibility and recreating the world he created in his novels.

== Home media ==
The DVD was released on February 18, 2003, by Lions Gate Entertainment. The DVD includes trailers and an audio commentary by Carrot Top, despite having nothing to do with the making of the film. He often comments on the attractiveness of each actress, begs Eric Stoltz for work every time he is on screen, and even occasionally sings along with the songs in the film, all the while making a number of self-deprecating jokes. Bret Easton Ellis later admitted on his podcast that Carrot Top was called in to replace his own commentary, which had been made under the influence of cocaine and tequila and merely observed the action onscreen. The DVD also features other commentaries from the cast and crew, including adult film performer Ron Jeremy speaking on one of the commentaries (one of the characters in the film mentions Jeremy's name in passing).

== TV series ==
In May 2014, Bravo announced that it would produce a TV series inspired by the book and film written by Avary for Lionsgate Television, with Greg Shapiro serving as an executive producer.
