= The Informers =

1994 short story collection by Bret Easton Ellis

- First edition cover
- Author: Bret Easton Ellis
- Language: English
- Publisher: Alfred A. Knopf
- Publication date: August 28, 1994
- Publication place: United States
- Media type: Print
- Pages: 0-679-43587-5
- Preceded by: American Psycho
- Followed by: Glamorama

The Informers is a collection of short stories, linked by the same continuity, written by American author Bret Easton Ellis. The collection was first published as a whole in 1994. Chapters 6 and 7, "Water from the Sun" and "Discovering Japan", were published separately in the UK by Picador in 2007. The stories display attributes similar to Ellis's novels Less than Zero, The Rules of Attraction, and, to a lesser extent, American Psycho. Like many of Ellis's novels, the stories are set predominantly in California.

== Stories ==
"Bruce Calls from Mulholland"
A nameless protagonist receives a phone call from Bruce, who discusses his romantic life (including sexual encounters with Lauren, his roommate's girlfriend). Bruce moves out of his apartment and in with Reynolds. The protagonist remembers the preceding summer, when he met Bruce at a workshop. After the call, he meets Reynolds for dinner. Although Reynolds makes conversation, all the protagonist can think about is Bruce and Lauren.
"At the Still Point"
Tim (the narrator) and his friends Raymond, Dirk, and Graham meet at a restaurant. Raymond remembers that it has been a year since the death of Jamie, a mutual acquaintance. Dirk breaks down, remembering Jamie's death in graphic detail. Raymond retreats to the bathroom to cry, and Tim goes to comfort him. Although Tim tells the reader that Jamie never liked Raymond, he tells Raymond that Jamie considered him a good friend. Tim notices inconsistencies in Dirk's story; although the coroner's report stated that Jamie died instantly when his car crashed, Dirk claims to have watched as Jamie slowly bled to death. Dirk dismisses Tim pointing out the inconsistency.
"The Up Escalator"
William's ex-wife (the narrator) is the mother of Graham and Susan. She is pushed out a window in a dream by Martin, her much-younger lover. She awakens wandering around in a Valium-induced daze; when she tries to converse with Graham and Susan, they ignore her or change the subject. She lunches with Martin, goes to his apartment and has sex with him, and gives him a pith helmet. The narrator sits by the pool and watches the pool cleaner, who finds two dead rats and starts talking to her. During lunch with friends, she daydreams about the pool boy. After talking with Susan she dreams of drowning rats and pool boys, wakes up and takes more Valium, and calls Martin. She has lunch with her son and daughter, gets a call from her mother, and remembers a childhood Christmas. The narrator sees her psychiatrist to renew her prescriptions and follows Graham, seeing him buy drugs. She then talks with Martin and lends him money. The narrator quarrels with William before they go to a party, and she contemplates filling William's insulin syringe with air.
"In the Islands"
Narrator Les Price, the father of Tim (Price, from "At the Still Point"), is on his office phone with a man named Lynch and sees Tim and Graham in line for a movie. He begins to notice that the two friends may have a physical relationship. Les gets a call from Elena, his ex-wife, who tells him that Tim does not want to go to Mauna Kea with him. Les picks Tim in his limousine the following day and, after unsuccessfully trying to talk to him, they go to the airport. They arrive in Hawaii and eat at the Mauna Kea restaurant; Les again tries unsuccessfully to talk with Tim. After dinner, they meet two women from Chicago at the bar. Les tries unsuccessfully to pick up the women and Tim, upset, leaves. They later go to the beach and Tim meets Rachel, a girl his age. The three have dinner; Les tries to pick up Rachel, and Tim again leaves. Les finds him in their room smoking marijuana and tearfully apologizes in vain. He again meets Rachel, talking with her about manta rays and Tim. Tim and Les then sit on the beach, gazing at the ocean.
"Sitting Still"
Narrator Susan, Graham's sister and William's daughter, is going to Los Angeles by train for her father's wedding. She remembers William asking if she approved of his marriage to Cheryl and admitting that he never told her mother about the marriage and their divorce was never finalized. Although Susan learns most of what she knows from Graham, she spent time with Cheryl one summer. William assumes that she likes Cheryl, but she tells Graham that she disapproves of the marriage. Susan calls her mother, and learns that she now knows about the wedding. She leaves Los Angeles by train, apparently returning to Camden College.
"Water from the Sun"
Cheryl Laine is a news anchor with a complicated love life. She married William, but he left her for a woman named Linda. Like William's other ex-wife (Graham's mother), Cheryl sleeps with much-younger men who use her for food and shelter. She reminds Danny (her boyfriend) to record her newscasts because he seldom sees her, and Danny tells her that Ricky — Danny's pal, Biff's boyfriend — has been murdered. Although Danny says that he cares, both seem indifferent. William tries to reconcile with Cheryl, who tells him that she is happier with Danny (despite her concern that he may be more attracted to Biff than to her). Danny abruptly dumps her, leaving a note in her apartment suggesting that she hook up with Biff.
"Discovering Japan"
Burned-out rock star Bryan Metro (Martin's friend's father and the ex-husband of Graham's mother's friend) travels to Japan as part of a world tour. He beats groupies, rapes hotel maids, has sex with underage girls, and commits drug-induced acts of self-mutilation. Bryan tries to negotiate his future in a drug-and-alcohol-induced stupor with his savvy, world-weary agent, who wants him to team up with the up-and-coming English Prices. He resists, too self-indulgent to care. Bryan unsuccessfully tries to reconcile with his ex-wife and son and ruminates about a former bandmate's suicide, an event omitted from a well-received documentary about the band's dissolution. He completes the tour (after a disastrous show in which he forgets the words of his songs), and prepares to return to the U.S.
"Letters from L.A."
The letters, from Anne (a 20-year-old Camden College student taking time off with her grandparents) to Sean, are written from September to January and decrease in frequency. Anne experiences physical, mental and emotional changes as she is exposed to the detached, morally-hollow Los Angeles mindset, evolving from a pale, brunette, sensitive student to a blonde, tan, vapid aerobics junkie. She details her friendship with the 30-year-old Randy, spending a great deal of time at his house and describing him as a best friend of sorts, but seems unaffected when he is possibly murdered.
"Another Gray Area"
Graham lives in an apartment with his girlfriend Christie and Randy and Martin, two other boys; Martin is having affairs with Graham and his mother. Although Graham thinks that Christie and Martin are also having sex, he does not care. Graham visits Martin at a building where Martin is filming a music video for the English Prices, whose stoned lead singer is difficult to work with. He has lunch with Christie, who tells him that a mutual friend has been found severely mutilated and drained of blood in Mexico. They argue about their relationship, concluding that neither cares if the other has sex with different people. Graham goes downstairs one morning and discovers that a hostage situation, involving a number of police officers, is unfolding across the street. He dismissively watches it with the doorman, who wants to be introduced to Martin so that he can get into music videos. Graham goes back upstairs, ignoring the outcome of the hostage situation. He later receives word that his father has been killed in a plane crash, and goes to Las Vegas to see the body and visit the accident site. Graham gambles most of his money away at casinos, and loses most of his father's ashes after betting them on a game of blackjack.
"The Secrets of Summer"
Jamie, whose death is described in "At the Still Point", is a sexist, racist young playboy who makes jokes about Ethiopians. He is (or thinks he is) a vampire, who sleeps in a coffin with cable television and lives on raw filet mignon and by drinking the blood of teenage girls during sex. He is part of a secret society of other "vampires" (including socialite Miranda and his friend, Dirk) which kills its victims instead of drinking their blood. When he visits Dirk, Jamie discovers mutilated body parts which indicate that he is a serial killer who is responsible for a number of deaths. They remember Roderick, who disappeared at the same time a pile of ashes was found at the bottom of his pool near a wooden stake and some garlic powder. The next time Jamie picks up a girl, she sees through his racism and lifestyle and he murders her. Jamie visits Dr. Nova, his psychiatrist, for more Darvocet. He taunts Nova by claiming responsibility for his father's death; the doctor calmly dismisses the story as one Jamie has told before, casting doubt on his reliability as a narrator. Jamie threatens to kill Nova's daughter, forcing him to write the prescription, and claims to be one of the biblical legion.
"The Fifth Wheel"
Car-wash attendant Tommy gets a call from Peter, an old acquaintance who wants to stay with him while he visits the city. Peter shows up with his girlfriend Mary, a heroin addict who sleeps on a mattress on the floor of Tommy's room. The morbidly-obese Peter eats all day and watches cartoons, while Mary shoots up in the bedroom. Tommy comes home one afternoon and finds a ten-year-old boy tied up in the bathtub; Peter explains that he owes money to Spin, a drug dealer, and the boy (kidnapped from a mall) is part of a plan to raise money for the debt. Tommy protests, and Peter assaults him. He becomes too apathetic to intervene, and takes extreme measures to avoid the bathroom. Time passes, and Peter does not demand a ransom from the parents of the boy (whom he is raping). One night, Tommy tries to have sex with Mary. She tells him that the last time they were in a similar situation, Peter shot his host in the eye and castrated him. Tommy persists, but Mary passes out. When Spin shows up and threatens Tommy, Peter decides to flee to Las Vegas and asks Tommy to come with him. Before they leave, he encourages Tommy to kill the boy. Tommy initially refuses, but eventually stabs the boy to death. The trio flee into the desert, and Peter reminds Tommy that the boy's death is on his hands and (not Peter's).
"On the Beach"
The narrator spends his days with his dying girlfriend, who wants to spend the time she has left on the beach at her mother's house in Malibu. He meditates on the girl's rapidly-deteriorating condition, which first appeared at their senior prom (at which he was high). With them are Mona, the girl's best friend, and a succession of young men Mona brings home. Griffin, the latest, drinks all the narrator's beer. The narrator has sex with Mona, telling her about his ambivalence towards his girlfriend and his decision to leave the following day; her impending death is a frightening reminder of his own mortality. He visits his girlfriend for the last time as she lies weakly on the beach, watching the sunset and listlessly begging to be allowed to work on her tan. The narrator then quietly walks away.
"At the Zoo with Bruce"
The narrator spends a day at the zoo with Bruce, her married lover, a television writer who has been using her for money and sex while promising to leave his wife. She sees parallels between injured animals they encounter and her life; her attempts to leave Bruce end with Bruce begging her not to, and her relenting. When the narrator confronts Bruce about leaving his wife, he tells her a long story about being an alien sent to Earth to prepare for its destruction in the 24th century. Leaving the zoo, the narrator contemplates independence from Bruce but sees no immediate escape from the situation.

== Film adaptation ==
A film version of the book has been produced from a script by Ellis and Nicholas Jarecki and was screened at the 2009 Sundance film festival. It was directed by Gregor Jordan and featured an ensemble cast, such as Winona Ryder, Billy Bob Thornton, Mickey Rourke, Amber Heard and Kim Basinger. It was Brad Renfro's last film before his death.

== Reception ==
Reviewing the book for The New York Times, Michiko Kakutani wrote that Ellis had written "a novel that is as cynical, shallow and stupid as the people it depicts". By contrast, in the London Evening Standard, Will Self said that "The Informers shows the work of a writer at the peak of his powers, deeply concerned with the moral decline of our society".

== Audiobook ==
In 2009, Audible.com produced an audio version of The Informers, narrated by Christian Rummel and Therese Plummer, as part of its Modern Vanguard line of audiobooks.
