= Less than Zero (novel) =

1985 novel by Bret Easton Ellis

- US first edition cover
- Author: Bret Easton Ellis
- Language: English
- Genre: Literary fiction
- Publisher: Simon & Schuster
- Publication date: 1985
- Publication place: United States
- Media type: Print
- Pages: 208 (First Edition)
- ISBN: 978-0-14-008894-6
- OCLC: 13746073
- Dewey Decimal: 813/.54 19
- LC Class: PS3555.L5937 L4 1986
- Followed by: Imperial Bedrooms

Less than Zero is the debut novel of Bret Easton Ellis, published in 1985. It was his first published effort, released when he was a 21-year-old student at Bennington College. The novel was titled after the Elvis Costello song of the same name.

== Plot summary ==
The novel follows the life of Clay, a rich young college student who has returned to his hometown of Los Angeles for winter break circa 1984. Through first-person narration, Clay describes his progressive alienation from the culture around him, loss of faith in his friends, and his meditations on events in his recent past.

After reuniting with his ex-girlfriend, Blair, and friends like Trent, now a successful model, Clay embarks on a series of drug-fueled nights of partying, during which he has one-night stands with both sexes. While partying, he tries to track down his high school best friend, Julian, with whom he has not spoken in months. In between descriptions of his days and nights, Clay recounts a vacation spent with his parents and grandparents, during which he seemed to be the only person concerned that his grandmother was dying of cancer.

Over time, Clay becomes increasingly disillusioned with the party scene as he witnesses his friends' apathy towards each other's suffering and that of those around them. At one party, he watches as the revellers joke and take Polaroids of his friend Muriel while she injects heroin; at another, he and Blair are the only two who exhibit revulsion when Trent shows a snuff film, which sexually excites several partygoers.

Clay ultimately tracks down Julian, who borrows a large sum of money from Clay. At first, Julian says the money is for an abortion, but Clay does not believe him. Later, when Clay asks Julian to pay him back, Julian brings him to meet his abusive pimp, Finn. It is revealed that Julian has become a heroin addict and turned to prostitution in order to pay off a debt to unnamed drug dealers. Believing what he has been told, yet still feeling an empty desire to witness this awful scene for himself, Clay accompanies Julian to a rendezvous in a hotel room with a married closeted businessman from Indiana, where he is compelled by the john to watch the man and Julian have sex for several hours.

After attending a concert with his friends, Clay accompanies them to an alleyway where they stare in fascination at the corpse of a young man, presumably dead by overdose. Afterward, Clay follows the group back to the home of his drug dealer Rip, who wants to show off his latest acquisition: a sex slave whom Rip has been keeping drugged in his bedroom. When Clay tells Rip, "I don't think it's right," Rip says, "What's right?" Clay leaves, but Trent decides to stay to participate.

Now feeling completely isolated and with winter break coming to an end, Clay reflects on the brutal nature of his surroundings as he returns to college in New Hampshire.

== Background ==
Ellis began work on what would become Less than Zero in 1980. He cites his major influences as Joan Didion and noir films set in Los Angeles, but he was also inspired by the moral ambiguity of American Gigolo.

Less than Zero was to become Ellis's first attempt at a proper novel, following much roman à clef juvenilia. Its first draft was incredibly emotional and overwrought, and in the third-person. Ellis's creative writing teacher, novelist Joe McGinniss, advised that he return to the first-person style of roman à clef (which Ellis was hesitant to do) and Ellis stripped it back, from there evoking the minimalist style for which it became famous.

In the former child actor Danny Bonaduce's 2002 autobiography, Random Acts of Badness, Bonaduce notes the striking similarity between the fictional high school in Less than Zero and The Buckley School in Sherman Oaks, California, where Bonaduce, recording artist Michael Jackson, film actor Christian Brando, and other children of wealth and celebrity, including Ellis himself, went to school together. In commenting on the novel, Bonaduce said, "When the book Less Than Zero came out, all my classmates were pissed. Not because it was an exact portrayal of our school – but because we failed to get any royalties."

== Characters ==
Less than Zero has an extensive cast of characters; the ones listed play major roles throughout the novel.

Clay
The 18-year-old protagonist, a student at Camden College in New Hampshire, who comes home to Los Angeles for Christmas and meets his old friends. He revives his old life: parties, concerts, drugs, sex, the city. Clay has brief affairs (a male USC student named Griffin (pp. 35–39), and an unnamed female character (pp. 120–122)), but he goes through periods of apathy and longing for his girlfriend Blair.
Blair
Clay's ex-girlfriend who is studying at USC. Clay is unsure how he feels about her; neither has he been faithful to her. They vacation together and though at first they enjoy the experience, it eventually becomes tedious and ends on a sour note.
Julian Wells
Clay's friend from grade school and high school. Julian is often described as "thin" and many of Clay's friends declare him "completely fucked up". Julian has become a heroin addict and a prostitute.
Trent Burroughs
Another of Clay's friends, a model who attends UCLA. He says things that Clay does not understand and Clay gradually becomes disenchanted with him. Trent is shown as increasingly unethical and immoral, raping a drugged twelve-year-old girl in his penultimate scene.
Rip Millar
Clay's dealer. Sporting a fedora and a penthouse on Wilshire Boulevard, Rip is also a DJ, but feels his trust fund "might never run out." At the end of the story, he shows Clay and other young men a 12-year-old girl naked, drugged and tied to his bed to be a sex slave. When a distressed Clay questions Rip as to why he has done this, Rip replies "Why not? What the hell?"
Daniel Carter
Daniel is another student who attends Camden and is from Los Angeles. Many of the characters think he is gay. In his earlier appearances, he was worried he had gotten a girl from Camden, Vanden, pregnant, but then does not seem to care. In his final appearance, he tells Clay he will not return to Camden, opting instead to stay in LA and write a screenplay. (Vanden, who is not seen in the book, later appears in American Psycho as well as The Rules of Attraction, in which she and Clay are briefly "involved".)
The Handsome Dunce
A minor character who has a cameo speaking to Clay at Blair's Christmas party. He goes on to appear in The Rules of Attraction, where it is revealed that he goes to Camden College and that his name is Steve.
Kim
One of Blair's friends. During the course of the book she is never sure where her film producer mother is and only knows what she reads in trade papers. At one point in the novel, she and Clay both agitate each other notably when they repeatedly question each other, "What do you do?", "What do you do?", this ending with Kim finally replying, "Don't ask me because...I don't know."
Alana
Another one of Blair's friends. She has an abortion and comes to Clay afterwards. Clay lets her stay in his room for the night while he lies by the pool until dawn. When he goes back up, she informs him she has bled a lot and feels weak before thanking him. When he asks "what for?" she says "I don't know" and leaves. When Clay flushes his toilet, it becomes clogged up with tissue and blood clouds the water. Clay puts the lid down as "there's nothing else for me to do".
Muriel
An anorexic girl who Clay visits at a rehabilitation center. She appears a few times in the novel, most notably at a New Year's party where she shoots heroin publicly while laughing and crying.
Finn Delaney
Julian's pimp, who "helps" him pay off his drug debt. In public, he acts kindly towards Julian, calling him "Julie" and "his best boy" and often showing him off to his clients, but in private he abuses Julian emotionally and sexually and forces him to shoot up heroin.
Clay's family
Clay has two sisters, aged 13 and 15, although his narration suggests he cannot distinguish between them and is unsure of their age. His parents are separated; his mother occupies their house while his father lives in an apartment. His mom has no job but nonetheless lives a life of luxury off of her ex-husband's large alimony payments, and his dad is "in the film business", with an office in Century City. In flashbacks, Clay talks about his grandfather, proprietor of several hotels, and his grandmother, now deceased.

== Film adaptation ==
The book Less than Zero was very loosely adapted into a movie in 1987 by 20th Century Fox. It starred Andrew McCarthy as Clay, Robert Downey Jr. as Julian, Jami Gertz as Blair, and James Spader as Rip. A then-unknown Brad Pitt also appeared as an extra. In the film, Clay is an anti-drug crusader who returns home from college to try to rescue his friends from their various narcotics addictions.

Due to all the liberties taken, Ellis refused to see the movie. In an interview, Ellis stated that he has warmed up to the movie, and appreciates it visually as a snapshot of a particular time. Ellis claimed that there was no connection between the book and the movie, except for the title, the location of Southern California and the names of the characters.

A long-running rumor in the film industry is that Quentin Tarantino has been interested in filming a new version of Less than Zero. His workmate Roger Avary adapted The Rules of Attraction (also based on a novel by Ellis) in 2002, and since both he and Tarantino like the works by Ellis, Tarantino has been eyeing the possibility of adapting Less than Zero. Ellis stated in an interview for Vice magazine that Quentin Tarantino has been "trying to get Fox to let him remake it." At a Q & A at Harvard Book Store in 2012 Ellis stated in a reply to a question of whether Less than Zero will be remade that Tarantino "has shown interest" in adapting the story.

== TV adaptation ==
On July 31, 2018, it was announced that Hulu had ordered a pilot for the series. Bret Easton Ellis was set to executive produce alongside Craig Wright, who was also the series developer, and Brett Morgan was set to direct the pilot. However, Hulu chose not to produce a series based on the pilot.

== Sequel ==
Ellis announced in 2005 that he would be writing a sequel to Less than Zero: a story following the same characters, set in the present day, that focuses on their lives as they approach middle age.

In January 2008, Ellis announced that his forthcoming novel Imperial Bedrooms would be the sequel to Less than Zero. In keeping with the original, the title is taken from the title of an Elvis Costello record (both a 1982 album and song). The book was published in 2010.

== Reception ==
The author stated in 2005:

I read it for the first time in about 20 years this year—recently. It was so great. I get it. I get fan mail now from people who weren't really born yet when the book came out. I don't think it's a perfect book by any means, but it's valid. I get where it comes from. I get what it is. I know that sounds so ambiguous. It's sort of out of my hands and it has its reputation, so what can you do about it? There's a lot of it that I wish was slightly more elegantly written. Overall, I was pretty shocked. It was pretty good writing for someone who was 19. I was pretty surprised by the level of writing.

Upon the release of Imperial Bedrooms, Details commented on Less than Zero and its original reviews, stating: "Years ago people could have read some of your books and said, 'Oh, this is just nihilism. These people don't exist! There's nobody that rich and stupid and narcissistic!'". (The article states, "When Michiko Kakutani first reviewed Less Than Zero in The New York Times in June of 1985, she began the review this way: 'This is one of the most disturbing novels I've read in a long time.'") Ellis remarks "surprise!". They also credit him with "In a way, [inventing] Paris Hilton and Spencer Pratt and the Kardashians."
