= Graham Campbell (actor) =

American actor (born 2001)

- Born: Graham Edward Campbell; October 4, 2001 (age 25)
- Education: Juilliard School (BFA)
- Occupation: Actor
- Years active: 2023–present

Graham Campbell (born October 4, 2001) is an American actor from New York City, known for playing Thom Wright on the 2026 FX and Hulu thriller series The Shards.

== Career ==
Campbell was born on October 4, 2001, and grew up as the youngest of three children in Massachusetts, where he attended Walnut Hill School for the Arts. He originally planned to study musical theatre, but decided on acting after being inspired by Timothée Chalamet's performances in Beautiful Boy and Call Me By Your Name. After graduating from The Juilliard School, Campbell starred in the 2023 revival of Branden Jacobs-Jenkins's Appropriate at Hayes Theater on Broadway.

Campbell made his film debut in Kent Jones's 2025 indie film Late Fame, which released in theatres in North America on August 7, 2026.

In 2025, Campbell was cast as a Thom Wright in The Shards, an FX adaptation of Bret Easton Ellis's 2023 semi-autobiographical novel developed by Ellis and Ryan Murphy. Campbell initially auditioned for the role of Bret (played by Igby Rigney), and read for the roles of Matt Kellner and Robert Mallory (played by Owen Painter and Homer Gere respectively), before Murphy cast him as Thom. The series premiered August 5, 2026.

In September 2026, he was announced as the lead for the film adaption of Fake Skating alongside Amélie Hoeferle. It is set for release by Sony Pictures for July 16, 2027.

== Filmography ==
†	Denotes productions that have not yet been released.

=== Film ===
Year	Title	Role	Notes	Ref.
2025	Late Fame	Sherfey		
2027†	Fake Skating	Alec	Schedule for release July 16, 2027	

=== Television ===
Year	Title	Role	Notes	Ref.
2026–present	The Shards	Thom Wright	Main role; 9 episodes	

=== Stage ===
Year	Production	Role	Theater	Ref.
2023–2024	Appropriate	Rhys Thurston	Hayes Theatre (November–March), Belasco Theatre (March–June)	
