= Darren Press =

American film producer

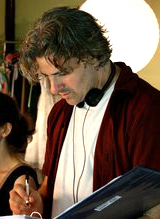
- Darren Press on the set of Theresa is a Mother
- Born: Queens, New York, US
- Occupations: Film director, producer & Writer
- Spouse: C. Fraser Press (1996– )
- Children: 3 girls: Schuyler Iona Press, Maeve Press, Amaya Press

Darren Press is an American film director and film producer from New York. He attended Boston University and California Western School of Law in San Diego. When he returned to New York City after law school, he studied and performed with the improv troupe Satire on Broadway and met his wife, writer/director/actress C. Fraser Press, who was also performing with the troupe. Press later became the managing director and Director for Gotham City Improv a former affiliate of The Groundlings and then became the managing director of the Melting Pot Theatre Company. He currently is a partner in the film, TV and theatre production company A May Sky Picture Entertainment.

== Theatre ==
Working with Melting Pot Artistic Director Larry Hirschhorn, Press produced among others the New York Premiere of Woody Guthrie's American Song a Drama Desk nominee and Outer Critics Circle Award winner and the New York Premiere of the Lee Blessing play Cobb winner of numerous awards including the Drama Desk. Actor/Producer Kevin Spacey joined the production team and Cobb was moved to the Lucille Lortel Theatre for an extended Off-Broadway run. After Cobb, Press focused on his writing and directing teaming with wife C. Fraser Press to direct and produce her one-woman show Why We Don't Bomb the Amish.

== Advertising ==
In 2003 Press was hired to write radio spots and print ads for an NYC advertising agency. In 2004 he started his own advertising agency, May Sky Inc. May Sky has represented clients such as Gallagher's Steak House, Gibbs College and WBLS. Press has won numerous awards as a Copywriter and Creative Director.

== Film ==
In 2007, Press again teamed with C. Fraser Press and produced the short film A Driving Lesson, a film accepted as an official selection to over 30 film festivals and which won awards at the Garden State Film Festival and Macon Film Festival. In 2012, Press Produced and Co-directed with his wife C. Fraser Press, the feature film Theresa is a Mother, starring C. Fraser Press, Edie McClurg, Richard Poe, Matthew Gumley and the Press's three girls Schuyler Iona, Maeve and Amaya Press. Theresa is a Mother has won numerous film festival awards including Best Feature Film at the Long Island International Film Expo, Chain NYC Film Festival, Amsterdam Film Festival "Van Gogh Award" Orlando Film Festival, Reel Independent Film Extravaganza Washington DC and The Independent Film Festival Manhattan. It has also picked up a Best Screenplay award from the NYC Independent Film Festival and Chain NYC Film Festival, Best Actress (C. Fraser Press) from the Reel Independent Film Extravaganza and Chain NYC Film Festival and Best Actor (Richard Poe) NYC Independent Film Festival. In a recent review, the West Orlando News wrote: "Between the genuine script and the excellent acting, this movie will leave you laughing throughout while pulling your heartstrings making it hard to fight back the tears. Every scene in this film showed the Press family as masters of storytelling, but what really makes this film enjoyable are the heartwarming emotions, genuine dialogue, and convincing characterization by every actor." Theresa is a Mother enjoyed a small theatrical release in New York City and the Hudson Valley and was released on Netflix and Amazon Prime. His latest film, A Cow in the Sky, is having its world premiere at Tribeca Festival in 2023.
