= Tide Turns Eternal =

Studio album by Dream Unending
- Released: November 19, 2021
- Recorded: 2021
- Studio: Boxcar Studios, Hamilton, Ontario, Canada; Solomon's Temple
- Genre: Death-doom
- Length: 45:10
- Language: English
- Label: 20 Buck Spin

Dream Unending chronology
Tide Turns Eternal (2021)	Song of Salvation (2022)

Tide Turns Eternal is the debut studio album by death-doom band Dream Unending, released by 20 Buck Spin on November 19, 2021.

== Reception ==
In Exclaim!, Chris Ayers gave this album an 8 out of 10, calling it "funeral doom for Pallbearer fans, but more cerebral for Mortiferum acolytes"; the publication also listed it on "25 Great Canadian Albums You Might Have Missed in 2021" with Tom Piekarski telling readers that the album "mesmerizes with its flanged guitar leads, gothic 12-string passages and richly harmonic fretless bass lines". Writing for Pitchfork, Sam Goldner gave this release a 7.8 out of 10, writing that one of its "gripping qualities" is "how much of it completely does away with death metal riffage altogether" and the final track shows "how emotionally boundless metal can be".

== Track listing ==
1. "Entrance" – 2:22
2. "Adorned in Lies" – 6:34
3. "In Cipher I Weep" – 7:55
4. "The Needful" – 5:25
5. "Dream Unending" – 11:07
6. "Forgotten Farewell" – 1:54
7. "Tide Turns Eternal" – 9:53

== Personnel ==
Dream Unending

- Justin DeTore – drums, vocals
- Derrick Vella – guitar, 12-string guitar, fretless bass

Additional personnel

- Jake Ballah – photography
- Chimère Noire – layout
- Scott Howe – photography
- Jesse Jacobi – logo
- Matthew Jaffe – artwork
- Sean Pearson – engineering at Boxcar Studios
- Richard Poe – additional vocals
- McKenna Rae – additional vocals
- John Powers – mixing
- Arthur Rizk – engineering at Solomon's Temple, mixing, mastering
- David Vella – keyboards

== See also ==
- List of 2021 albums
