= The Shards (TV series) =

American television series

- Genre: Teen drama; Thriller; Coming of age
- Created by: Ryan Murphy; Bret Easton Ellis
- Based on: The Shards by Bret Easton Ellis
- Showrunners: Ryan Murphy; Bret Easton Ellis
- Starring: Igby Rigney; Kaia Gerber; Homer Gere; Hayes Warner; Graham Campbell; Evan Rachel Wood; Wes Bentley
- Narrated by: Igby Rigney
- Composers: Morgan Kibby; David Klotz
- Country of origin: United States
- Original language: English
- No. of seasons: 1
- No. of episodes: 9

Production
- Executive producers: Ryan Murphy; Nina Jacobson; Brad Simpson; Bret Easton Ellis; Eric Kovtun; Scott Robertson; Nissa Diederich; Tanase Popa; Nick Hall; Michael Uppendahl; Max Winkler; Kathleen McCaffrey; Brian Young
- Producers: Justin McEwen; Adam Penn
- Editor: Adam Penn
- Running time: 25–55 minutes
- Production companies: 20th Television; Ryan Murphy Television; Color Force; Sodium Fox Productions

Original release
- Network: FX; FX on Hulu
- Release: August 5, 2026 – present

The Shards is an American teen thriller television series for FX and FX on Hulu. It was created by Ryan Murphy and Bret Easton Ellis, based on Ellis's semi-autobiographical novel. The series premiered on August 5, 2026.

== Premise ==
The series is set in Los Angeles in 1981. The story follows a 17-year-old version of Ellis during his final year at the elite Buckley prep school. Upending the character's world is the arrival of a mysterious new student, Robert Mallory, whose unsettling presence coincides with the activities of a serial killer known as The Trawler.

== Cast and characters ==
=== Main ===
- Igby Rigney as Bret Easton Ellis, a senior at the Buckley prep school and aspiring writer
- Kaia Gerber as Susan Reynolds, the student body president at Buckley and Thom's girlfriend
- Homer Gere as Robert Mallory, a mysterious new student at Buckley
- Hayes Warner as Debbie Schaffer, a popular student at Buckley and Bret's girlfriend
- Graham Campbell as Thom Wright, the school quarterback and Susan's boyfriend
- Evan Rachel Wood as Liz Schaffer, Debbie's mother and a former model, with whom Debbie has a tense relationship
- Wes Bentley as Terry Schaffer, Debbie's father and a noted Hollywood film producer

=== Recurring ===
- Owen Painter as Matt Kellner, a reclusive student at Buckley with whom Bret has a secret relationship
- Jordan Roth as Steven Reinhardt, Terry's flamboyant and enigmatic assistant
- Daniel Dale as Ryan Gifford / Troy Wad, a student at Buckley and a pornographic film actor who has brief affairs with Bret and Debbie
- Ivy Wolk as Really Rhonda, a student at Buckley who suffers from a neurological condition that causes sudden and unfiltered verbal outbursts
- Cortés Alexander as Principal Croft

=== Guest ===
- Gus Halper as Bruce, the leader of the Riders of the Afterlife cult and a former high school English teacher
- Dot-Marie Jones as Jan "Butch" Banxxx, a prolific pornographic film producer
- Bella Valdes as Corazón "Cha Cha" Rodriguez, a popular dancer on the television show Dance Off!
- Ginifer King as Mrs. Wright, Thom's mother
- Anthony Ramos as Tony Cruz, the host of Dance Off!
- James Wolk as Ron Kellner, Matt's father
- Chris Conner as Detective Fregosi
- Noma Dumezweni as Ms. Rogers
- Constance Zimmer as Abigail, Robert's aunt

== Episodes ==
No.	Title	Directed by	Written by	Original release date	Viewers (millions)
1	"Pilot"	Ryan Murphy	Ryan Murphy & Bret Easton Ellis	August 5, 2026	0.35
In 1981, aspiring writer Bret Easton Ellis, his girlfriend Debbie Schaffer, his longtime friend Susan Reynolds, and Susan's boyfriend Thom Wright are a group of wealthy and privileged students at the elite Buckley prep school in Los Angeles. The closeted Bret is secretly having affairs with classmates Ryan Gifford—who later ends things with him—and Matt Kellner. On the first day of senior year, the mutilated corpse of a teenage girl is found on a tennis court, and new student Robert Mallory introduces himself to Bret's group. Bret insists he saw Robert at a screening of The Shining the previous summer, which Robert denies. Growing suspicious, Bret follows Robert after school, leading to a car chase. The two end up at a mall, where Robert tells Bret he does not like being followed and again denies seeing The Shining. Returning home, Bret watches a news report on The Trawler, a local serial killer targeting young people, and receives a phone call from someone pleading for help.
2	"Don't You Want Me"	Michael Uppendahl	Ryan Murphy & Bret Easton Ellis	August 5, 2026	0.22
When Susan announces she is throwing a welcome party for Robert, having learned from Principal Croft that he spent time in a mental institution, Bret tells the group that Robert cannot be trusted but is ignored. Bret attends a party with Debbie, where Robert antagonizes Bret by confessing that he wants to have sex with Susan. Bret leaves the party and visits Matt, who accuses Bret of making strange phone calls, draining his fish tank and painting a pentagram on a poster in his room. Bret attempts to assuage Matt, saying he must be disoriented due to his frequent use of cannabis, but Matt angrily tells Bret to leave him alone. Bret meets with Debbie's father, Hollywood producer Terry Schaffer, about optioning the film rights to his upcoming novel, during which Terry asks Bret about his relationship with Debbie and other men. Matt is reported missing for five days, and his blood-stained backpack is found near a beach. Bret plays a tape left in his mailbox and is disturbed to hear The Trawler torturing Matt, forcing him to eat his pet fish.
3	"Help Me! Rhonda!"	Michael Uppendahl	Ryan Murphy & Juli Weiner	August 12, 2026	0.26
Rhonda Fox, a student at Buckley, is being held captive and tortured by The Trawler, who orders her to eat live eels. Out of respect for Matt and Rhonda, who are both still missing, Bret unsuccessfully tries to convince the rest of the group to cancel Robert's welcome party. After a second meeting to discuss Bret's novel, Terry takes him to a secluded spot on a secret street, but Bret becomes uncomfortable when a van pulls over and asks Terry to drive him home. That night, Bret goes to Matt's place to search for clues and receives a phone call from The Trawler, who merely breathes into the phone and ignores Bret's questions about Matt's and Rhonda's whereabouts. The next day after school, Bret, determined to prove that Robert is The Trawler, secretly follows him to a remote house. After Robert leaves with a bag, Bret sneaks in and goes down into the basement, where he finds a Buckley blazer inside an open cage. Underneath the blazer, Bret finds a bloody iguana, which prompts him to flee.
4	"Robert's Party"	Max Minghella	Juli Weiner	August 12, 2026	0.24
Ryan, who moonlights as a pornographic actor for financial reasons, is surprised when Debbie's mother, Liz, is cast as his co-star in a film. During Robert's party at Susan's house, Thom becomes jealous as Susan and Robert grow closer. Robert's old friends tell Bret about a rumor that Robert killed his own mother, who died after falling down a flight of stairs. After Bret accuses Robert of killing his mother, Robert becomes upset and starts drinking. Susan becomes worried about Robert's increasingly erratic behavior, while Bret tries to convince Susan that Robert is dangerous. A drunken Robert jumps into the swimming pool, prompting Susan and Thom to rescue him. Feeling neglected by Bret, Debbie starts hooking up with Ryan in an upstairs bedroom until they are interrupted by a cult leader wielding a knife. Upon hearing Debbie's screams, Bret and Thom rush to her rescue, and the man quietly leaves after calling Thom by his name. The next morning, Thom denies knowing the intruder.
5	"Murder on the Dancefloor"	Ryan Murphy	Ryan Murphy & Charles Rogers	August 19, 2026	0.27
Bret, Debbie, Susan, and Robert participate on the dance competition television show Dance Off!, with Debbie determined to become "Groover of the Week". Terry has his assistant, Steven Reinhardt, bribe the producers to give Debbie more screen time. Steven tells Ryan that he recognizes him from his pornographic films. Tony Cruz, the show's host, is furious when reigning champion Cha Cha Rodriguez threatens to expose their affair to his wife and reveals that she is pregnant. Thom arrives unexpectedly and warns Robert to stay away from Susan. Robert retorts that Thom is looking for someone to blame for his own insecurities. For the couples' dance segment, Robert invites Susan to the dance floor. Thom gets into a fight with Robert before leaving the studio. The Trawler kills Cha Cha in the restroom. When Susan is crowned "Groover of the Week", Debbie storms off, blaming Terry for her loss. Bret follows Debbie to the restroom, where they discover Cha Cha's corpse. A bloodied Rhonda suddenly roller-skates onto the dance floor.
6	"Homecoming"	Crystle Roberson Dorsey	Charles Rogers & Juli Weiner	August 26, 2026	0.21
7	"Homecoming"	Crystle Roberson Dorsey	Charles Rogers & Juli Weiner	August 26, 2026	0.21
Rhonda tells Detectives Fregosi and Donaldson that she only remembers her kidnapper's "girlie smell". Convinced that Robert is behind Matt's disappearance and Rhonda's kidnapping, Bret visits Matt's father, Ron, who reveals that Matt invited Robert over for dinner a few weeks earlier, and that his private investigator uncovered Robert's troubled past, but the file of his psychiatric evaluation was missing. Ron also shows Bret a notebook found under Matt's mattress, which indicates that he was part of a cult. Susan and Debbie decide to campaign for Rhonda for the title of homecoming queen. After watching a news report on a murdered teenage boy, a possible victim of The Trawler, Bret convinces Fregosi and Donaldson to tail Robert. Thom secretly meets with Bruce, the cult leader from Robert's welcome party; Bruce tells a vulnerable Thom that he does not need his friends or family, and that he needs to die. When Bret accuses Robert of being a serial killer, Robert admits that he has in fact watched The Shining. While Susan and Debbie are giving Rhonda a makeover, Liz sprays her new Giorgio perfume—a gift from Terry—on Rhonda, which triggers her to remember the "girlie smell". Susan, Debbie, Rhonda, Robert, Thom, and Ryan are announced as part of the senior homecoming court. Robert flirts with Susan and gifts her a bottle of Giorgio perfume, which she applies on her wrist. Robert and Susan are crowned homecoming king and queen. As Susan hands her tiara over to Rhonda, whom she describes as a "true queen", Rhonda recognizes Susan's perfume and publicly accuses her of kidnapping her, leading to Susan's arrest. Robert tells Bret that Susan has an alibi, as he told the police that he and Susan were at his house on the nights that Rhonda and Matt disappeared, when the police questioned Robert based on Bret's accusations. Robert accuses Bret of being obsessed with him and warns him to back off. After Robert leaves, Bret is horrified to find Matt's severed head and hands in the school's trophy case.
8	"Hamlet"	Max Minghella	Lenore Zion & Charles Rogers & Juli Weiner	September 2, 2026	N/A
Susan is released from prison after Rhonda recanted her accusation and was committed to a psychiatric hospital. The police investigate Matt's murder. Susan breaks up with Thom after he proposes a suicide pact. Steven tells Liz that he knows about the pornographic film she made with Ryan, promising to keep her secret if she persuades Terry to let him co-produce his next feature film, an adaptation of Bret's novel Less than Zero. Bret sees The Trawler lurking outside his house before finding an envelope in his bedroom, containing a videotape of his sexual encounter with Terry in a hotel room. Robert's aunt Abigail tells Bret that Robert denied seeing Bret at the screening of The Shining because he was there with The Trawler's first victim, Katherine Latchford. Later, Bret finds Robert in his room, tearfully insisting that he has never hurt anybody and that his mental health struggles do not make him a bad person. As Bret comforts Robert, the two end up having sex. The next morning, Robert leaves shortly after Bret awakens.
9	"Stairway to Heaven"	Michael Uppendahl	Juli Weiner & Charles Rogers	September 9, 2026	0.17
After receiving a videotape, Debbie blackmails Terry into helping her become a film star, without revealing what she has discovered about him. Thom proposes to Susan, who rebuffs him, disturbed by his erratic behavior. Debbie is horrified to discover the severed head of her pet horse Spirit in her bed. Steven asks Terry for a chance to co-produce Less than Zero, but Terry refuses. Robert confesses his love for Susan. One night, Susan is attacked by a masked intruder in her bedroom before Thom seemingly rescues her. At a Halloween party hosted by Debbie, Susan accuses Thom of being the attacker, while Robert denies sleeping with Bret before revealing that he is dating Susan, sending Bret over the edge. Terry is pushed off the balcony by an unseen assailant and is placed on life support. At the police station, Detectives Fregosi and Donaldson gather Bret, Robert, Susan, Debbie, Thom, Ryan, Liz, and Steven in an interrogation room, saying they have evidence that one of them is responsible for Katherine and Matt's murders and Rhonda's kidnapping.

== Production ==
=== Development ===
In April 2023, it was reported that Ellis would write the series based on his novel for HBO, with Ellis executive producing alongside Nick Hall and Brian Young. In a June 2023 interview with the Spanish publication El Independiente, Ellis had confirmed that Luca Guadagnino was set to direct the series with Ellis himself saying that he may direct some episodes as well. In January 2025, Ellis revealed that the adaptation, which Kristoffer Borgli had signed on to direct, was no longer being developed at HBO, following creative differences. In February 2025, Ryan Murphy was revealed to be in closing talks to revive the project at a different network.

In May 2025, it was announced that FX was in early development on the series and it would be directed by Max Winkler. It is produced by 20th Television in association with Ryan Murphy Television. Murphy, Ellis and Winkler executive produce alongside Nick Hall, Kathleen McCaffrey, Michael Uppendahl, Brian Young, Alexis Martin Woodall, Nina Jacobson, Brad Simpson, Braxton Pope, and Tanase Popa. In July 2025, the series was officially greenlit. Murphy has talked about a plan for the show to run for at least 3 seasons.

=== Casting ===
Prior to the series order, Jacob Elordi was reported to be in talks for a role in the adaption in September 2023. In July 2025, in addition to the greenlight of the show announcement, it was revealed that Igby Rigney, Homer Gere, and Graham Campbell joined the cast as Ellis, Robert Mallory, and Thom Wright respectively. In August 2025, it was revealed that Hayes Warner joined the cast as Debbie Schaffer. In October 2025, Wes Bentley joined the cast as Debbie's father Terry alongside Evan Rachel Wood and Jordan Roth who were cast in recurring roles. In April 2026, it was reported that Owen Painter had been cast to the series.

=== Music ===
In July 2026, it was revealed that Troye Sivan and his longtime collaborator Leland contributed the original music for The Shards alongside Oscar Görres and the series star Hayes Warner. "LA Wants Me Dead" performed by Sivan, and written by him, Leland, and Görres, was released on August 12, 2026.

=== Filming ===
Principal photography began in November 2025 and wrapped in March 2026.

== Release ==
In March 2026, Brad Simpson revealed in an interview that The Shards had been aiming for a summer airdate. In June 2026, it was announced that the series would premiere on August 5, 2026. FX and Hulu released the first two episodes of the series on August 5, with the remaining episodes released weekly on Wednesdays through the season finale on September 9. Internationally, The Shards was made available for streaming on Disney+.

== Reception ==
=== Critical response ===
On the review aggregator website Rotten Tomatoes, 56% of 57 critics' reviews are positive, with an average of rated reviews of 6.3/10. The website's critics consensus reads, "The combination of Ryan Murphy and Bret Easton Ellis should elicit magnanimously pulpy TV, but instead The Shards relegates itself to obtuse style with mildly entertaining substance." Metacritic, which uses a weighted average, assigned the show a score of 55 out of 100, based on 24 critics, indicating "mixed or average" reviews.

=== Ratings ===
On FX, The Shards averaged 237,000 viewers for its initial airings.

On streaming, The Shards ranked No. 2 on Hulu's "Top 15 Today" list—a daily updated list of the platform's most-watched titles—on August 6, 2026, the day after its premiere. Streaming analytics firm FlixPatrol, which monitors daily updated VOD charts and streaming ratings across the globe, reported that The Shards ranked No. 1 as the most-streamed series worldwide on Disney+ on August 15. On the same day, the series was notably the most-streamed series on Disney+ in countries including Albania, Australia, Belgium, Denmark, Ecuador, France, Germany, and New Zealand. Overall, The Shards remained on Hulu's "Top 15 Today" list from August 6 through September 18.
