= Ivy Wolk =

American actress (born 2004)

- Wolk in 2025
- Born: August 24, 2004 (age 22); Los Angeles, California, U.S.
- Occupations: Actress; comedian
- Years active: 2019–present

Ivy Wolk (born August 24, 2004) is an American actress, comedian, and writer. She is known for her roles as Tellulah on the Freeform series Everything's Gonna Be Okay (2020), as Crystal in Anora (2024) and Diana in If I Had Legs I'd Kick You (2025) and stars in the television adaptation of The Shards directed by Ryan Murphy. She is also known online for her provocative social media presence.

== Early life ==
Ivy Wolk was born on August 24, 2004, and raised in Los Angeles. Her mother is a landscape architect and her father works in standards and practices for Jimmy Kimmel Live!. As a child, she was a member of the Los Angeles Derby Dolls, a roller derby league. At the age of 13, she began posting comedic videos on TikTok under the handle @fathoodbitch and gained more than 200,000 followers.

== Career ==
Wolk had her first professional onscreen role as Tellulah, a drama-starting high schooler and frenemy to main character Genevieve, played by Maeve Press, on the first season of the Freeform comedy television series Everything's Gonna Be Okay, which aired in 2020. She deactivated her first TikTok account soon after booking the role in 2019 at the request of Freeform executives.

Entertainment Weekly's Alamin Yohannes called her a standout among the show's recurring characters. She did not return for its second season. She later rejoined TikTok under the username @lives_in_a_society during the COVID-19 pandemic and gained a following for her provocative persona. After tweets of hers were shared online and garnered controversy, she soon deleted her TikTok account. While finishing high school, she played a small role in Judd Apatow's 2022 film The Bubble.

Wolk briefly attended Emerson College in Boston, where she joined a sketch comedy group, but dropped out in her first year after shooting the film Anora at the start of 2023. In the film, she played Crystal, a teenage candy shop employee whose friend, Vanya (played by Mark Eidelstein), hires a sex worker, Anora (played by Mikey Madison), to be his girlfriend. Wolk had direct messaged the film's director, Sean Baker, on Instagram while in high school after attending a screening of his film Red Rocket; she said Baker was drawn to her "weird internet presence" and invited her to audition. Anora won the Palme d'Or on its premiere at the 2024 Cannes Film Festival.

Wolk appeared later that year in the ensemble cast of the FX television series English Teacher as Chelsea, a sardonic high school student and best friend to Kayla, played by Romy Mars. Michael Cuby of Them praised Wolk as "a more-than-welcome screen presence" in the series. Also that year, she had a supporting role in Eugene Kotlyarenko's comedy film The Code as Colette. Wolk moved to Brooklyn after appearing in Anora and began performing stand-up comedy in New York.

In 2025, she starred in the second part of anthology film series Castration Movie, Castration Movie ii. The Best of Both Worlds. A short story written by Wolk was published in the magazine Volume 0 later that year.

Wolk appeared in Mary Bronstein's film If I Had Legs I'd Kick You and Jonah Hill's film Outcome.

== Public image ==
Wolk at the 2025 Toronto International Film Festival

Wolk became known for her presence on Twitter, where her tweets have routinely garnered controversy, and is associated with the Dimes Square group. Wolk has been described by Tobias Hess of Paper as an "internet provocateur" whose tweets "frequently invite virality and vitriol" and by Michael Cuby of Them as a "Twitter sensation".

Interview's Emily Sandstrom wrote in 2024 that her tweets consisted of "unbridled, witty and perverse cultural commentary" as well as "more vulnerable personal accounts of coming of age in the thorny entertainment industry". For Teen Vogue, Jose Useche and Allison Bloom wrote that she was "known for her dry humor, tasteful apathy, and sardonic delivery". Jason P. Frank of Vulture wrote that she typically portrayed Zoomers "who have a tendency to say cancellable things".

Wolk, however, has maintained that her persona is "very earnest" and is frequently misconstrued due to her being autistic. She stated in a 2025 Cultured magazine interview, "I would not consider myself an ironic person at all". She has listed Courtney Love, Amy Winehouse, and Sandra Bernhard as her biggest inspirations. She was included on GLAAD's 20 Under 20 list in 2024.

Wolk is also known online for her appearance, particularly her sharp bangs and her unibrow.

== Filmography ==
=== Film ===
Key
†	Denotes films that have not yet been released

Year	Title	Role	Notes	Ref.
2022	The Bubble	Anti-Krystal YouTuber		
2024	Anora	Crystal		
2024	The Code	Colette		
2024	Www.RachelOrmont.com	Audience Member		
2024	Friendship	Jen Peyser		
2025	If I Had Legs I'd Kick You	Diana		
2025	Castration Movie Anthology ii. The Best of Both Worlds	Keller		
2025	Faggo	Caroline	Short film	
2025	The Napa Boys	Prancer		
2026	Outcome	Sammy		
2026	Roommates	Auguste		
TBA	Grind †	TBA	Post-production	

=== Television ===
Year	Title	Role	Notes	Ref(s)
2020	Everything's Gonna Be Okay	Tellulah	6 episodes	
2022	Lifted	TBA	TV pilot	
2024–2025	English Teacher	Chelsea	4 episodes	
2026	Deli Boys	Seven Sugar	2 episodes	
2026	The Shards	Rhonda	5 episodes	
2026	All's Fair	Reese Calloway	Episode: "Liberty Unleashed"	

=== Stage ===
Year	Title	Role	Notes	Ref.
2026–2027	Downstate	Effie	Booth Theatre, New York City	

=== Podcasts ===
Year	Title	Position	Notes
2026	Struggle Bus	Co-host	
