= Theresa Is a Mother =

- Film poster
- Directed by: Darren Press and C. Fraser Press
- Written by: C. Fraser Press
- Produced by: Darren Press
- Starring: Edie McClurg; C. Fraser Press; Matthew Gumley; Schuyler Iona Press; Maeve Press; Richard Poe
- Cinematography: Alex Kornreich
- Edited by: Chad Smith
- Music by: Schuyler Iona Press
- Distributed by: Garden Thieves Pictures (Worldwide - all media)
- Release date: October 4, 2012 (Vegas Cine Fest)
- Running time: 101 minutes
- Country: United States
- Language: English

Theresa is a Mother is a 2012 American comedy drama feature film directed by C. Fraser Press and Darren Press, and starring Edie McClurg, C. Fraser Press, Matthew Gumley, Schuyler Iona Press, Maeve Press and Richard Poe. The screenplay is by C. Fraser Press. The film was produced by A May Sky Picture Entertainment and is being distributed worldwide by Garden Thieves Pictures.

The film has screened at numerous film festivals around the country. Theresa is a Mother has been the recipient of 16 film festival awards including seven festival wins for Best Feature Film.

== Synopsis ==
Theresa McDermott has chased her “ideal” life as an urban-dwelling, punk(ish) singer-songwriter to the very end of its possible existence. She is broke, options have run out and she happens to have a few kids she is raising on her own since their dad split a year ago. Facing eviction and nowhere to go, Theresa packs up her children and what is left of her life and moves back to the small rural town, childhood home and parents she deliberately ran from a decade ago. Her parents’ mutual misery and depressingly gloomy lives were a “downer” she felt had no place in her fun city life. Yet from the moment Theresa drives back up her old driveway, it is clear that there have been some major changes. Her parents, armed with a plethora of hobbies, a hot tub and a new philosophy, are not exactly the old folks she left behind. Theresa needs a job, her parents need their space and a painful family history needs some closure. Old wounds, unattainable dreams, and some “other things” are exposed as a fractured family works to become whole and a woman with a few kids learns to become a mother.

== Music ==
Music plays a major role in Theresa is a Mother. The Theresa is a Mother sound track features an eclectic array of music from Garage Punk to Merengue to Crooner to Southern Fried Honky Tonk. The main theme, “Summer Child” written and composed by 14-year-old cast member Schuyler Iona Press (plays role of Maggie McDermott), was arranged and recorded by pianist John Ferrara. Another song written and composed by Schuyler Iona Press, “No Words,” was arranged for the guitar and recorded by student Grammy Award Band member Gabe Schnider. “No Words” is used throughout Theresa is a Mother as a main part of the film score. The Theresa Is A Mother Soundtrack features original music from: The Two-Bit Terribles, Frank Lamphere, Honky Tonk Union, Rumba Con Son, The Dave Sammarco Band, Karu, and Schuyler Iona Press. An official soundtrack has yet to be released.

== Awards and nominations ==
- WINNER Best Film - Amsterdam Film Festival - Van Gogh Award
- WINNER Best Film - Long Island International Film Expo - Jury Award
- WINNER Best Film - Chain NYC Film Festival
- WINNER Best Film - Orlando Film Festival
- WINNER Best Film - Reel Independent Film Extravaganza
- WINNER Best Film - International Film Festival Manhattan
- WINNER Best Film - Director's Choice - Northeast Film Festival
- WINNER Best Director - Orlando Film Festival
- WINNER Best Director - Chain NYC Film Festival
- WINNER Best Screenplay - NYC Independent Film Festival
- WINNER Best Actress (C. Fraser Press) - Reel Independent Film Extravaganza
- WINNER Best Actress (C. Fraser Press) - Chain NYC Film Festival
- WINNER Best Ensemble - Chain NYC Film Festival
- WINNER Best Supporting Actor (Richard Poe) - Maverick Movie Awards - Maverick Movie Awards
- WINNER Best Actor (Richard Poe) - NYC Independent Film Festival
- Nominated Best Supporting Actor (Matthew Gumley) - Reel Independent Film Extravaganza
- Nominated Best Supporting Actress (Schuyler Iona Press) - Reel Independent Film Extravaganza
- Nominated Best Film - NYC Independent Film Festival
- Nominated Best Performer (C. Fraser Press) - Orlando Film Festival
- Nominated Best Performer (C. Fraser Press) - Northeast Film Festival
- Nominated Best Performer (C. Fraser Press) - Maverick Movie Awards
- Nominated Best Score (C. Fraser Press) - Orlando Film Festival
- Nominated Best Film - Maverick Move Awards - Maverick Movie Awards
- Nominated Best Supporting Actor (Matthew Gumley) - Maverick Movie Awards
- Nominated Best Supporting Actress (Edie McClurg) - Maverick Movie Awards
