= David Nettheim =

Australian actor (1925–2008)

- Born: David Cosman Nettheim; 10 July 1925; Sydney, Australia
- Died: 11 March 2008 (aged 82); Sydney, Australia
- Other name: David Netheim (billed as)
- Occupations: Actor, theatre writer
- Years active: 1927–?

David Cosman Nettheim (10 July 1925 – 11 March 2008), also billed as David Netheim, was an Australian character actor and theatre writer, he acted in radio, theatre and film, but was best known for his roles in numerous television series, both locally and in the United Kingdom

== Early life ==
Born in Sydney, and brought up in Cremorne Point, one of five children and the eldest son of actor (Leslie) Roy Nettheim who was also involved in radio and theatre and who hosted a classical music programme on radio 2GB and its Macquarie Radio Network) and actress, singer and elocution teacher Mary Hosking, he was introduced to the theatre when his parents joined Doris Fitton's Independent Theatre.

== Career ==
He was educated at Sydney Grammar School and joined 2GB as an office boy in 1941. He took on occasional writing and announcing roles and was involved in production of John Dease's Quiz Kids.

He helped Sir Charles Mackerras (an old schoolfriend) prepare classical music programmes for radio. He adapted Xavier Herbert's Capricornia as a radio serial.

He was involved with the Metropolitan Theatre, Mercury Theatre and Phillip Street Theatre, where he both wrote for and acted in their famous revues.

He worked with Michael Bentine and John Bluthal in the Goon Show-like radio programme Three's a Crowd for radio 2UE, which ran for 34 weekly half-hour episodes. He next worked in Britain with Peter Sellers and Michael Bentine in the 1957 television comedy skit show Yes, It's the Cathode-Ray Tube Show. The following year he moved to Britain, and for 20 years he was seldom out of work but maintained ties with Australia in regular hookups with John West for his radio programme The Showman. In 1971 he appeared in the acclaimed BBC drama Elizabeth R as forger Thomas Phelippes.

In 1977 he settled in the Sydney suburb of Glebe. He appeared in stage and television productions, and took on the positions of federal treasurer for Actors Equity. He was involved in the doomed campaign to save the Regent Theatre in Sydney from demolition and helped manage the Actors' Benevolent Fund.

Throughout the 1980s and 1990s Nettheim appeared in guest roles in numerous Australian TV mini series and serials, including Prisoner, Sons and Daughters, and A Country Practice.

== Death ==
He died 11 March 2008 in Sydney aged 82. He never married and was survived by two brothers and two sisters.

== Filmography ==
=== Film ===
| Title | Year | Role | Notes |
|---|---|---|---|
| Make Mine a Million | 1959 | Professor | Feature film |
| Never Die | 1959 | Ted | TV movie |
| BBC Sunday-Night Play | 1963 | Fomin | TV movie |
| Masquerade | 1965 | Photographer (uncredited) | Feature film |
| Nobody Runs Forever (aka The High Commissioner) | 1968 | Blaney (uncredited) | Feature film |
| The Promise | 1969 | Stepfather | Feature film |
| The Pied Piper | 1972 | Kulik | Feature film |
| Never Mind the Quality, Feel the Width | 1973 | Rabbi | Feature film |
| Arena | 1975 | | TV movie |
| Ripkin | 1978 | Andrew Clifford | TV movie |
| Who Killed Baby Azaria? (aka The Disappearance of Azaria Chamberlain) | 1983 | Bookwriter | TV movie |
| Bliss | 1985 | Cornelius | Feature film |
| Dr. Jekyll and Mr. Hyde | 1986 | Mr. Hyde (voice) | Film |
| Kidnapped | 1986 | Voice | Animated feature film |
| Frank Enstein | ? | Voice | Animated feat film |
| Paws | 1997 | Rabbi | Feature film |

=== Television ===
| Title | Year | Role | Notes |
|---|---|---|---|
| The Adventures of Long John Silver | 1957 | Lieutenant Leon | TV series |
| Before Your Very Eyes | 1957 | | TV series |
| Yes, It's the Cathode-Ray Tube Show! | 1957 | Various Characters | TV series |
| BBC Sunday Night Theatre | 1959 | Bill | TV series |
| The Buds of Paragon Row | 1959 | Mr. Fellowes | TV series |
| ITV Play of the Week | 1959 | Stenographer | TV series |
| No Tiding Place | 1959 | Korski | TV series |
| The Flying Doctor | 1959 | Chemist | TV series |
| The Army Game | 1959–60 | Professor Fanshawe – Professor Spratt | TV series |
| Emergency Ward 10 | 1960 | Dr. John MacDermot | TV series |
| Boyd Q.C. | 1960 | Gordon Nicholls | TV series |
| Theatre 70 | 1961 | Union official | TV series |
| Probation Officer | 1961 | Probation Officer | TV series |
| Friday Night | 1963 | Rabbi | TV series |
| Maigret | 1963 | Gaston Buziers | TV series |
| The Avengers | 1963 | Umberto | TV series |
| Compact | 1964 | Arthur Plum | TV series |
| Thorndiye | 1964 | Stalker | TV series |
| Crane | 1963–65 | Aziz – Chavez | TV series |
| Public Eye | 1965 | Teddy Booram | TV series |
| Out of the Unknown | 1965 | Analyst | TV series |
| The Baron | 1967 | Cravos | TV series |
| The Saint | 1967 | Inspector Umberto Crepi | TV series |
| The Prisoner | 1967 | Doctor | TV series |
| Man in a Suitcase | 1967 | Leader | TV series |
| A Hundred Years of Humphrey Hastings | | | TV series |
| The Troubleshooters | 1967 | Dr. Mayer | TV series |
| Doctor Who | | Fedorin | TV series |
| ITV Playhouse | 1968 | John Ruggles | TV series |
| Virgin of the Secret Service | 1968 | Kontell | TV series |
| Resurrection | 1968 | 2nd Judge | TV miniseries |
| Thirty-Minute Theatre | 1968 | Ben | TV series |
| Z Cars | 1969 | Mr. Cooper | TV series |
| Canterbury Tales | 1969 | Placebo | TV series |
| Biography | 1970 | Barwitz | TV series |
| Never Mind the Quality, Feel the Width | 1970 | Rabbi Stone | TV series |
| Elizabeth R | 1971 | Thomas Phelippes | TV miniseries |
| BBC Play of the Month | 1971 | Moliere – Officer | TV series |
| Spyder's Web | 1972 | Grolik | TV series |
| Dial M for Murder | 1974 | Leonides | TV series |
| Microbes and Men | 1974 | Deville | TV series |
| Behind the Legend | 1975 | | TV series |
| Glenview High | 1978 | | TV series |
| A Place in the World | 1979 | Laurie Carter | TV miniseries |
| Cop Shop | 1980–82 | Mr Rogers – Bruce Sinclair – Alan Sinclair | TV series |
| Prisoner (aka Prisoner: Cell Block H) | 1980–82 | George Logan – Magistrate – Mr. Carter | TV series |
| Sons and Daughters | 1982–84 | Scott Thompson | TV series |
| The Lancaster Miller Affair | 1985 | Dr. Tallman | TV miniseries |
| Rafferty's Rules | 1988 | Dr. Turpin | TV series |
| Emma: Queen of the South Seas | 1988 | Kaiser Wilhelm II | TV miniseries |
| A Country Practice | 1992 | Peter West | TV series |
| G.P. | 1991-94 | Murray Phipps | TV series |
| Wildside | 1998 | Brian Leech | TV series |
| Love is a Four Letter Word | 2001 | Judge | TV series |
