= Song of Salvation =

Studio album by Dream Unending
- Released: November 11, 2022
- Studio: Boxcar Studios, Hamilton, Ontario, Canada; Solomon's Temple
- Genre: Death-doom
- Length: 43:41
- Language: English
- Label: 20 Buck Spin

Dream Unending chronology
Tide Turns Eternal (2021)	Song of Salvation (2022)

Song of Salvation is the second studio album by death-doom band Dream Unending, released by 20 Buck Spin on November 11, 2022.

== Reception ==
Editors at Pitchfork chose this as Best New Music of the week, with critic Sam Sodomsky giving it an 8.5 out of 10 for "exploding death metal into atmospheric and experimental new dimensions", cautioning readers that the overwhelming emotional heft of the music can have "the cumulative effect is intense and a little dangerous if you are in the wrong mood". Writing for Sputnikmusic, Sunnyvale rated this release a 4.2 out of 5, writing that "this is a pretty astounding accomplishment of a second album" that "shows that Dream Unending are now actually doing what they already suggested they’re capable of". Editors at Stereogum chose this for Album of the Week, with reviewer Tom Breihan writing that this work finds the band "digging deep into the mines of depression and hopelessness and finding some perfect, glittering gems amidst all the murk" and characterizes this as "heavy music about heavy things, but it brings a sense of beauty and lightness and maybe even hope".

== Track listing ==
1. "Song of Salvation" – 14:06
2. "Secret Grief" – 5:06
3. "Murmur of Voices" – 2:42
4. "Unrequited" – 5:44
5. "Ecstatic Reign" – 16:03

== Personnel ==
Dream Unending

- Justin DeTore (credited as "The Bridge Between Two Worlds") – drums, vocals
- Derrick Vella (credit as "Architect of Dreams") – guitar, 12-string guitar, fretless bass

Additional personnel

- Leila Abdul-Rauf (credited as "The Siren Call") – trumpet
- J. K. Allison – drum recording at Boxcar Studios
- Max Klebanoff (credited as "Final Judgement") – additional drums
- Chimère Noire – layout
- Sean Pearson – guitar recording at Solomon's Temple
- Richard Poe (credited as "The Dreamer") – additional vocals
- McKenna Rae (credited as "The Implorer") – additional vocals
- Arthur Rizk – drum recording at Boxcar Studios, mixing, mastering
- Phil Swanson (credited as "The Forlorn") – additional vocals
- Benjamin A. Vierling – cover painting
- David Vella – keyboards, synthesizer

== See also ==
- Lists of 2022 albums
