= Everything's Gonna Be Okay =

American comedy television series

- Promotional poster
- Genre: Comedy drama
- Created by: Josh Thomas
- Starring: Josh Thomas; Kayla Cromer; Adam Faison; Maeve Press
- Composer: Bryony Marks
- Country of origin: United States
- Original language: English
- No. of seasons: 2
- No. of episodes: 20

Production
- Executive producers: Josh Thomas; Stephanie Swedlove; Kevin Whyt; Richard Allen-Turner; David Martin; Jon Thoday
- Camera setup: Single-camera
- Running time: 20–30 minutes
- Production companies: John & Josh International; Avalon Television

Original release
- Network: Freeform
- Release: January 16, 2020 – June 3, 2021

Everything's Gonna Be Okay is an American comedy drama television series created by Australian comedian Josh Thomas. Everything's Gonna Be Okay premiered on Freeform on January 16, 2020. In May 2020, the series was renewed for a second season which premiered on April 8, 2021. In August 2021, the series was canceled after two seasons.

== Premise ==
Nicholas, an Australian in his twenties, visits his American father and two teenage half-sisters in Los Angeles. During his visit, he learns that their father is terminally ill and wants Nicholas to become the guardian to Genevieve and Matilda, because their mother is already dead.

== Cast ==
=== Main ===
- Josh Thomas as Nicholas Moss: a neurotic, gay Australian entomologist in his twenties. At the end of season two he gets diagnosed with autism.
- Kayla Cromer as Matilda Moss: Nicholas's autistic half-sister who is 17 years old at the start of the series. She is a gifted classical composer. Cromer herself is autistic, which she felt helped her land the part despite self-submitting without an agent.
- Adam Faison as Alex: Nicholas' boyfriend.
- Maeve Press as Genevieve Moss: Nicholas's half-sister who is an aspiring writer. She is 14 years old at the start of the series.

=== Recurring ===
- Lillian Carrier as Drea, Matilda's autistic asexual girlfriend and later wife
- Lori Mae Hernandez as Barb, Genevieve's friend
- Vivienne Walshe as Penny, Nicholas's mother who occasionally video calls from Australia
- Charlie Evans as Leonard, Genevieve's love interest
- Vico Ortiz as Lindsey, Alex's friend
- Christopher May as Darren Moss, Nicholas's father (season 1)
- Carsen Warner as Jeremy, Matilda's classmate (season 1, guest season 2)
- Kimleigh Smith as Mrs. Hall, Genevieve's teacher (season 1, guest season 2)
- Ivy Wolk as Tellulah, Genevieve's friend (season 1)
- Mason Gooding as Luke, Matilda's crush (season 1)
- Timothy Isaac Brundidge as Zane, Matilda's classmate who she sleeps with at a party (season 1)
- Hye Young Park as Sam, Matilda's teacher (season 1)
- James M. Connor as Principal Young, Genevieve and Matilda's principal (season 1)
- Maria Bamford as Suze, Drea's mother (season 2)
- Richard Kind as Tobias, Drea's father (season 2)
- Christian Valderrama as Oscar, Genevieve's love interest (season 2)
- CJ Jones as Eric, Alex's deaf father (season 2)

== Episodes ==
Season	Episodes	Originally released	
Season	Episodes	First released	Last released
1	10	January 16, 2020	March 12, 2020
2	10	April 8, 2021	June 3, 2021

=== Season 1 (2020) ===
No. overall	No. in season	Title	Directed by	Written by	Original release date	U.S viewers (millions)
1	1	"Seven-Spotted Ladybug"	Rebecca Thomas	Josh Thomas	January 16, 2020	0.302
Just as Nicholas is about to leave the United States for Australia, his father and the father of his two half-sisters, Matilda and Genevieve, tells Nicholas that he is dying.
2	2	"Greenbottle Blue Tarantula"	Silas Howard	Josh Thomas & Marissa Berlin & Vivienne Walshe	January 16, 2020	0.216
The girls struggle when they return to normal life. Nicholas loses his key so tries to sneak into the house through the window. He breaks his pinky, which causes a fight that escalates.
3	3	"Giant Asian Mantises"	Silas Howard	Teleplay by : Josh Thomas; Story by : Jess Meyer	January 23, 2020	0.141
Genevieve wants to have a low-key birthday party with her friends, including peer-pressuring Tellulah. Matilda convinces Alex to get drunk with her.
4	4	"Silkmoths"	Rachel Lee Goldenberg	Hye Yun Park	January 30, 2020	0.257
Nicolas and Alex's relationship is suddenly tested after Genevieve found out at their night out. Matilda gets left home alone with her crush, Luke.
5	5	"West African Giant Black Millipedes"	Silas Howard	Catya McMullen	February 6, 2020	0.144
6	6	"Harvester Ants"	Silas Howard	Marissa Berlin	February 13, 2020	0.098
After Matilda has sex with an 18-year-old boy while drunk, Nicholas attacks the school principal, who is dismissive of the fact. Alex and Nicholas argue on a vacation.
7	7	"Blue Death-Feigning Beetles"	Rachel Lee Goldenberg	Marissa Berlin & Vivienne Walshe	February 20, 2020	0.122
Matilda panics over the differences between success and feeling guilty on the biggest night of her life. Nicolas invited a crowd of people over after video chatting with his mother Penny back in Australia.
8	8	"Maggots"	Rachel Lee Goldenberg	Vivienne Walshe	February 27, 2020	0.130
Nicolas's relationship with Alex is tested when he gets in trouble. Nicolas and Alex decide to work it out at home. Meanwhile, Genevieve and Matilda question their different sexualities.
9	9	"Monarch Butterflies"	Rachel Lee Goldenberg	Teleplay by : Josh Thomas; Story by : Jess Meyer & Josh Thomas	March 5, 2020	0.159
Nicolas is forced to face reality in Genevieve and Matilda's parent-teacher conferences. Matilda grows more concerned about her relationships.
10	10	"Discoid Cockroaches"	Silas Howard	Josh Thomas	March 12, 2020	0.184
The entire Moss family decides to travel to New York City to teach Matilda how to ride the subway. Genevieve tries to keep her revelation a surprise.

=== Season 2 (2021) ===
No. overall	No. in season	Title	Directed by	Written by	Original release date	U.S viewers (millions)
11	1	"Gray Bird Grasshopper"	Silas Howard	Josh Thomas	April 8, 2021	0.193
Nicholas, Matilda, Genevieve, and Alex are shown to be quarantining together due to the COVID-19 pandemic. Matilda has sequestered herself in her room. Her family tries to get her to leave, and Genevieve ultimately cuts her own finger to prompt Matilda to come and care for her. Genevieve looks at Matilda's computer while it is unattended, and deduces that Matilda is uncertain whether she is a lesbian. Genevieve tells Matilda that she must disclose this to Drea before continuing a relationship with her.
12	2	"Jungle Centipede"	Silas Howard	Vivienne Walshe	April 8, 2021	0.113
Alex learns that his parents are divorcing. Drea and Matilda go on a series of socially distanced dates in Matilda's front yard, where Matilda leads Drea in verbal sexual roleplays. Nicholas and Alex bond with Suze and Toby while they wait for the dates to conclude. Genevieve confronts Matilda about what she saw on her computer. Matilda states that she has determined that she's not sexually attracted to women. Nicholas and Genevieve push Matilda to break up with Drea, and she does so on their next date.
13	3	"Emperor Scorpion"	Silas Howard	Marissa Berlin	April 15, 2021	0.116
On the anniversary of their father's death, Nicholas, Matilda, and Genevieve observe a number of rituals to honor him. Afterwards, Matilda and Genevieve confess to each other that they did not feel particularly sad during the rituals, then discuss sex. Alex is frustrated that Nicholas is not very forthcoming with his emotions and tries to get him to open up. Nicholas eventually admits that he feels that his grief is less important than other people's feelings. Alex pushes him to set boundaries with his mother, who still speaks in demeaning ways about his father.
14	4	"Cave Cockroaches"	Josh Thomas	Thomas Ward	April 22, 2021	0.096
Genevieve tries a hand at vlogging about Joan of Arc but due to only positive praises from Alex and others, deletes it and instead makes a video about her reaction of their reaction to her first video. Oscar who has a crush on her replies on her comment and later calls her. Alex is still sad about his parents' divorce and disappointed when Nicholas takes 2 weeks to ask about his feelings. They fight. Matilda and Drea become friends. Drea comes out as asexual and they agree to become girlfriends if Matilda can have casual sex with men.
15	5	"California Banana Slugs"	Rachael Holder	Vivian Walshe	April 29, 2021	0.107
16	6	"Regal Jumping Spider"	Rachael Holder	Teleplay by : Dana Donnelly & Josh Thomas; Story by : Josh Thomas	May 6, 2021	0.141
17	7	"Woolly Bear Caterpillar"	Rachael Holder	Thomas Ward	May 13, 2021	0.109
18	8	"Banded Argiope Spider"	Josh Thomas	Marissa Berlin	May 20, 2021	0.078
19	9	"California Sphinx Moth"	Rachel Holder	Allison Lyman and Josh Thomas	May 27, 2021	N/A
To comfort Nicholas after his breakup, Suze tells Nicholas that she believes he may be autistic. Nicholas and Genevieve are skeptical. After doing more research, Genevieve changes her mind and walks Nicholas through an online autism assessment. This convinces both of them that Nicholas is autistic. Nicholas discloses his realization to Matilda. She disputes this initially, but eventually agrees that he is likely autistic. The episode ends with Nicholas in a medical setting, presumably pursuing an official diagnosis.
20	10	"Gulf Fritillary Butterfly"	Josh Thomas	Josh Thomas & Thomas Ward	June 3, 2021	0.096
On the eve of Matilda's wedding, Alex visits to re-establish a cordial relationship with Nicholas before the event. After Matilda forces Nicholas to disclose his diagnosis to Alex, Nicholas leaves without talking anything through with him. On the morning of Matilda's wedding, Genevieve finally voices her misgivings and asks Matilda to cancel the wedding. Matilda is hurt but ultimately decides to continue getting married. At the wedding, Alex tries to get back together with Nicholas, but Nicholas says they should try to find people to love them without changing themselves.

== Production ==
=== Development ===
On May 10, 2018, it was announced that Freeform had given a pilot order to Everything's Gonna Be Okay, written by Australian comedian Josh Thomas. On December 12, 2018, it was announced that the pilot was picked up to series by Freeform with a 10-episode series order. It was also announced that Thomas would be serving as showrunner with David Martin, Jon Thoday, and Richard Allen-Turner executive producing on behalf of Avalon Television. Stephanie Swedlove and Kevin Whyte would serve as executive producers. On May 19, 2020, Freeform renewed the series for a second season which premiered on April 8, 2021, and ran for 10 episodes until June 3, 2021. On August 17, 2021, Freeform canceled the series after two seasons.

=== Casting ===
After Thomas' announcement to be starring in the series as Nicholas, actress Kayla Cromer was revealed to be portraying Matilda in November 2019. Cromer herself is autistic, which she felt helped her land the part despite self-submitting without an agent. That same month, Maeve Press was cast as Genevieve, Nicholas' 15-year-old half-sister. In January 2020, days before the series premiered, Adam Faison was cast as Alex, Nicholas' boyfriend.

== Release ==
Episodes were available the day after airing on Hulu and Freeform On Demand in the U.S. The series was distributed internationally by Avalon Distribution.

In Australia, the series was released on streaming service Stan, the same day as the U.S.

== Reception ==
=== Critical response ===
On Rotten Tomatoes, the series has an approval rating of 95% based on 21 reviews, with an average rating of 7.5/10. The website's critical consensus reads, "Sweetly poignant and warmly witty Everything's Gonna Be Okay is as big-hearted and nuanced as the well-written characters at its center." On Metacritic, it has a weighted average score of 79 out of 100, based on 11 critics, indicating "generally favorable reviews". Steve Greene of IndieWire, reviewing season one, praised the show's narrative empathy and "grace notes" between the show's more typical chapters. Luke Buckmaster of The Guardian was more guarded, stating the show "misses its marks" and only hits its stride after the season's first episode. Upon the premiere of episodes "Gray Bird Grasshopper" and "Jungle Centipede", critic Alex Reif of laughingplace.com provided positive feedback, noting "...the strength of the series is that it tackles serious issues in a [..] comical way", and that the show is "a breath of fresh air".

=== Ratings ===
==== Season 1 ====
Viewership and ratings per episode of Everything's Gonna Be Okay
No.	Title	Air date	Rating (18–49)	Viewers (millions)	DVR (18–49)	DVR viewers (millions)	Total (18–49)	Total viewers (millions)
1	"Seven-Spotted Ladybug"	January 16, 2020	0.12	0.302	0.05	0.108	0.18	0.410
2	"Greenbottle Blue Tarantula"	January 16, 2020	0.07	0.216	0.05	0.099	0.12	0.315
3	"Giant Asian Mantises"	January 23, 2020	0.04	0.141	0.05	0.075	0.08	0.216
4	"Silkmoths"	January 30, 2020	0.13	0.257	0.05	0.105	0.18	0.362
5	"West African Giant Black Millipedes"	February 6, 2020	0.03	0.144	0.04	0.086	0.07	0.230
6	"Harvester Ants"	February 13, 2020	0.04	0.098	0.04	0.093	0.08	0.191
7	"Blue Death-Feigning Beetles"	February 20, 2020	0.04	0.122	0.05	0.096	0.09	0.218
8	"Maggots"	February 27, 2020	0.04	0.130	0.04	0.075	0.08	0.235
9	"Monarch Butterflies"	March 5, 2020	0.06	0.159	TBD	TBD	TBD	TBD
10	"Discoid Cockroaches"	March 12, 2020	0.06	0.184	TBD	TBD	TBD	TBD

==== Season 2 ====
Viewership and ratings per episode of Everything's Gonna Be Okay
No.	Title	Air date	Rating (18–49)	Viewers (millions)	DVR (18–49)	DVR viewers (millions)	Total (18–49)	Total viewers (millions)
1	"Gray Bird Grasshopper"	April 8, 2021	0.08	0.193	TBD	TBD	TBD	TBD
2	"Jungle Centipede"	April 8, 2021	0.04	0.113	TBD	TBD	TBD	TBD
3	"Emperor Scorpion"	April 15, 2021	0.05	0.116	TBD	TBD	TBD	TBD
4	"Cave Cockroaches"	April 22, 2021	0.05	0.096	TBD	TBD	TBD	TBD
5	"California Banana Slugs"	April 29, 2021	0.02	0.107	TBD	TBD	TBD	TBD
6	"Regal Jumping Spider"	May 6, 2021	0.06	0.141	TBD	TBD	TBD	TBD
7	"Woolly Bear Caterpillar"	May 13, 2021	0.05	0.109	TBD	TBD	TBD	TBD
8	"Banded Argiope Spider"	May 20, 2021	0.04	0.078	TBD	TBD	TBD	TBD
10	"Gulf Fritillary Butterfly"	June 3, 2021	0.04	0.096	TBD	TBD	TBD	TBD

=== Accolades ===
Year	Award	Category	Nominee	Result	Ref.
2021	GLAAD Media Awards	Outstanding Comedy Series	Everything's Gonna Be Okay	Nominated	
2021	Hollywood Critics Association TV Awards	Best Cable Series, Comedy	Everything's Gonna Be Okay	Nominated	
