= Hot Year =

- Directed by: Roxy Sorkin
- Written by: Roxy Sorkin
- Produced by: Christine Vachon; Pamela Koffler
- Starring: Kathryn Newton; Storm Reid; Cole Sprouse; Dove Cameron; Owen Painter; J. Smith-Cameron
- Production companies: Killer Films; Wagner Entertainment; Hype Studios; Mosaic Films
- Country: United States
- Language: English

Hot Year is an upcoming American coming-of-age revenge thriller film written and directed by Roxy Sorkin in her feature directorial debut. The film stars Kathryn Newton, Storm Reid, Cole Sprouse, Dove Cameron, Owen Painter, and J. Smith-Cameron.

== Premise ==
Set in a small Pacific Northwest town during a summer heatwave, the film follows two childhood best friends whose revenge plan against an ex-boyfriend escalates into a violent incident, testing their loyalty and identities.

== Cast ==
- Kathryn Newton
- Storm Reid
- Cole Sprouse
- Dove Cameron
- Owen Painter
- J. Smith-Cameron

== Production ==
=== Development ===
In April 2026, it was announced that Roxy Sorkin would make her feature directorial debut with Hot Year, based on a screenplay she wrote. Killer Films and Wagner Entertainment were attached as production companies, with Christine Vachon and Pamela Koffler producing.

=== Casting ===
In April 2026, Kathryn Newton, Storm Reid, Dove Cameron, Owen Painter, and J. Smith-Cameron were cast in the film. Later that month, Cole Sprouse joined the ensemble cast.

=== Filming ===
Principal photography was scheduled to begin in Oklahoma in May 2026.
