= Kayla Cromer =

American actress (born 1998)

- Born: February 17, 1998 (age 28); San Jose, California, U.S.
- Occupation: Actress
- Years active: 2015–present
- Known for: Everything's Gonna Be Okay

Kayla Cromer (born February 17, 1998) is an American actress. In 2020, she began appearing as Matilda in the series Everything's Gonna Be Okay. She is the first actor openly with autism to play a main character with autism in a TV series.

== Early life ==
Cromer was born in San Jose, California, to Pam and Reno Cromer and grew up in the suburb of Morgan Hill. She became interested in the paranormal when she was nine years old and received her first piece of paranormal investigation equipment at the age of 10 as a Christmas gift. Cromer has investigated famous locations such as the RMS Queen Mary when she was in eighth grade and the Winchester Mystery House.

Originally wanting to be a criminal profiler with the FBI, she began to desire a career in acting after watching Keira Knightley in Pirates of the Caribbean: The Curse of the Black Pearl. In 2017, she moved to Los Angeles to focus on her acting career.

== Career ==
Cromer made her acting debut in the TV series South of Hell in 2015. She later appeared in the films Desert Dwellers and Blood Orange, the latter of which she wrote before landing the role of Matilda in Everything's Gonna Be Okay. She was set to appear in a film titled Okinawa but production was derailed due to the death of the writer and director in 2018. She has also worked as a model. In 2024 she joined the cast of The Good Doctor as Charlotte "Charlie" Lukaitis, an autistic medical student. She first appeared on the show in Season 7's episode 2 titled "Skin in the Game".

== Personal life ==
Cromer was diagnosed with dyscalculia, dyslexia and attention deficit hyperactivity disorder at the age of seven and was diagnosed with autism spectrum disorder years later. She publicly disclosed her diagnosis at the 2019 Freeform Summit. She is the first openly autistic actor to play a main character with autism in a TV series and works as an activist trying to end the stigma of having autism.

== Filmography ==
=== Film ===
Year	Title	Role	Notes
2016	Desert Dwellers	Gloria	
2017	Blood Orange	Tiffany	

=== Television ===
Year	Title	Role	Notes
2015	South of Hell	Young Maria/Abigail	2 episodes
2017	Ghost Brothers	Herself	1 episode
2020–2021	Everything's Gonna Be Okay	Matilda Moss	All episodes
2023	Monster High	Twyla Boogeyman (voice)	5 episodes
2024	The Good Doctor	Charlotte “Charlie” Lukaitis	Season 7
