= Double Down South =

American billiards drama film

- Directed by: Tom Schulman
- Written by: Tom Schulman
- Produced by: Tom Schulman; Rick Wallace; Sara Sometti Michaels; Seth Michaels
- Starring: Lili Simmons; Kim Coates; Igby Rigney; Tom Bower; Justin Marcel McManus
- Production company: Benacus Media
- Release dates: 15 October 2022 (Newport); 19 January 2024; (United States)
- Running time: 120 minutes
- Country: United States
- Language: English

Double Down South is a 2022 American indie drama film written, directed and produced by Tom Schulman, and starring Lili Simmons, Kim Coates, Igby Rigney, Tom Bower and Justin Marcel McManus.

== Premise ==
Set in the world of Keno pool gambling at the turn of the 21st century in the rural south of the United States. Diana (Simmons) is a rising star, under the wing of keno veteran Nick (Coates), and the self-proclaimed "best keno player alive". However, as the stakes are raised so is the dangerous nature of their livelihood.

== Cast ==
- Lili Simmons as Diana
- Kim Coates as Nick
- Igby Rigney as Young Nick
- Tom Bower as Old Nick
- Justin Marcel McManus as Beaumont DuBinion
- Rebecca Lines as Sheila

== Production ==
Originally entitled Southern Gothic, writer-director Tom Schulman based elements of the film of his own experiences playing Keno which began in Nashville when he was 13 years old.

Schulman also produced the film, alongside Rick Wallace, Sara Sometti Michaels and Seth Michaels. Lili Simmons, Kim Coates, Igby Rigney, Tom Bower and Justin Marcel McManus were announced in the cast in April 2022. Principal photography was completed by April 2022. Filming took place in Georgia. In May 2023, Jackrabbit Media secured distribution rights to North America.

== Release ==
The film had its premiere at the Newport Beach Film Festival on 15 October 2022. The film will be released in theatres in the United States on January 19, 2024.

== Reception ==
On the review aggregator website Rotten Tomatoes, Double Down South holds an approval rating of 80% from 5 reviews.
