= Lili Simmons =

American actress (born 1993)

- Born: July 23, 1993 (age 33); Cardiff-by-the-Sea, California, U.S.
- Occupations: Actress; model
- Years active: 2010–present

Lili Simmons (born July 23, 1993) is an American actress and model known for her roles as Rebecca Bowman in the Cinemax series Banshee (2013–2016) and Claudia Flynn in the Starz series Power Book IV: Force (2022–2025).

== Early life ==
Simmons was born and raised in Cardiff-by-the-Sea in San Diego County, California. At age 15, Simmons was discovered by talent manager Kate Linden.

== Career ==
Simmons began her career as a Ford Model, also modelling for Bebe Stores, Roxy, J.C. Penney and Saturn.

She moved into acting in 2010 on the web series Hollywood Is Like High School with Money, based on the book of the same name, playing Quinn Whitaker. She also appeared in an episode of the Disney XD sitcom Zeke and Luther and then in the 2011 Disney Channel Original Movie Geek Charming. Also that year, she had a small role in an episode of the sitcom Mr. Sunshine.

In 2012, Simmons starred in the film Fat Kid Rules the World, and guest starred in an episode of Jane by Design. In 2013, she appeared in an episode of Vegas and began playing Rebecca Bowman, a rebellious Amish girl on the Cinemax series Banshee. She originally auditioned for the role of Deva Hopewell, but: "They said, 'She's too old or too sexy' or whatever". While in Philadelphia for her grandmother's funeral, the producers asked her to go back to New York to read for Rebecca, after which she won the role. In March that year, she appeared in a pictorial in Maxim magazine.

In 2014, Simmons began recurring roles on Hawaii Five-0, and the series True Detective. In April 2016, she was cast in what had been stated would be a recurring role in another series, Westworld, though she appeared in only one episode during the first season. In February 2017, Simmons was cast in a season-long arc on the fifth season of the Showtime drama series Ray Donovan, playing Natalie James, "the star of a big movie franchise".

In April 2019, it was confirmed by actress Camren Bicondova that Simmons was cast to replace her in the role of the adult Selina Kyle / Catwoman for the series finale of Gotham, at Bicondova's request to "give the torch to someone else for her adult self", which was respected by the Fox Broadcasting Company, Warner Bros. Television, and the series' producers. Bicondova and Simmons met beforehand and collaborated on the characterization. Showrunner John Stevens described casting Simmons as "a stroke of incredible good fortune", as well as praising her as "an incredible actress and looks like she could be Cam's sister."

In 2022, she played a pool shark in the independent feature film Double Down South. The film was released in 2024 which also saw her complete the final season of Power Book IV: Force.

== Filmography ==
=== Film ===
Year	Title	Role	Notes
2012	Fat Kid Rules the World	Isabel	
2015	Bone Tomahawk	Samantha O'Dwyer	
2016	Dirty Lies	Michelle	
2016	Robyn Hood: I Love NY	Robyn Hood	Short film
2017	Deux Face	Sand	Short film
2017	Bad Match	Riley	
2021	Sound of Violence	Marie Sotker	
2022	Double Down South	Diana	Lead role
2023	Clive Boomer's Success	Rita	Main role

=== Television ===
Year	Title	Role	Notes
2010	Zeke and Luther	Mia	Episode: "Sludge"
2011	Mr. Sunshine	Hot Teenage Girl	Episode: "Employee of the Year"
2011	Geek Charming	Lola Leighton	Television film
2012	Jane by Design	Piper Grace	Episode: "The Teen Model"
2013	Vegas	Fay Binder	Episode: "Road Trip"
2013–2016	Banshee	Rebecca Bowman	Main role, 32 episodes
2014	True Detective	Beth	2 episodes
2014–2017	Hawaii Five-0	Amber Vitale / Melissa Armstrong	Recurring role, 6 episodes
2017	Ray Donovan	Natalie James	Recurring role (season 5), 8 episodes
2016; 2018; 2022	Westworld	New Clementine / Sophia	Episodes: "Trace Decay", "Akane no Mai", "Well Enough Alone"
2018	Law & Order: Special Victims Unit	Gina Goodrich	Episode: "Accredo"
2018	The Purge	Lila Stanton	Main role
2019	Gotham	Adult Selina Kyle	Episode: "The Beginning..."
2022–2025	Power Book IV: Force	Claudia Flynn	Main role
2026	9-1-1: Nashville	Chloe Kelly	Episode: "In Cold Blood"

=== Web ===
Year	Title	Role	Notes
2010	Hollywood Is Like High School with Money	Quinn Whitaker	9 episodes
2013–2016	Banshee Origins	Rebecca Bowman	3 episodes
