= Tom Schulman =

American screenwriter (born 1950)

- Born: Thomas H. Schulman; October 20, 1950 (age 75); Nashville, Tennessee, U.S.
- Occupations: Screenwriter, film director

Thomas H. Schulman (born October 20, 1950) is an American screenwriter best known for his semi-autobiographical screenplay Dead Poets Society, which won the Academy Award for Best Original Screenplay in 1989.

== Life and career ==
Following high school at Montgomery Bell Academy, Schulman earned a Bachelor of Arts (BA) in philosophy, graduating in 1972 from Vanderbilt University in Nashville. Schulman pursued his interest in film at the University of Southern California's Graduate School of Cinema.

Dead Poets Society won the Academy Award for Best Original Screenplay in 1989, and was nominated for Best Picture and Best Director (Peter Weir). The character of John Keating was inspired by one of Schulman's teachers at Montgomery Bell Academy in Nashville.

Prior to Dead Poets Society, Schulman had already written several telemovies. However, Dead Poets Society was his first movie script to reach the screen. He was hired to rewrite the hit movie Honey, I Shrunk the Kids shortly before the film was due to begin shooting; Schulman had just seven days to turn it from a drama into a comedy.

Other scripts written or co-written by Schulman include comedies Welcome to Mooseport, What About Bob?, Second Sight (which Schulman sold the same day as Dead Poets Society) and Holy Man, which stars Eddie Murphy. The Sean Connery drama Medicine Man, originally entitled The Stand, proved a critical failure. Schulman executive produced the movie Indecent Proposal.

Schulman's directorial debut was the 1997 black comedy 8 Heads in a Duffel Bag, which stars Joe Pesci as a gangster attempting to transport a bag of severed heads across the United States. In 2022, Schulman returned to directing with Double Down South, a seedy sports drama set in Mississippi's underground keno pool scene (a world Schulman encountered as a teenager).

In 2009, Schulman was elected vice president of the Writers Guild of America, West. He was a member of the WGA negotiating committee during the extended writers' strike of 2023.

== Filmography ==
Year	Film	Credit	Notes
1976	Joy Ride: An Auto Theft	Written by, assistant director	Short film, co-wrote with Bill Crain
1986	The Gladiator	Story by, executive producer	Co-wrote story with Jeffrey Walker and William Bleich
1988	A Father's Revenge	Story by	Co-wrote story with Mel Frohman
1989	Dead Poets Society	Written by	
1989	Honey, I Shrunk the Kids	Screenplay by	Co-wrote screenplay with Ed Naha
1989	Second Sight	Written by	Co-wrote with Patricia Resnick
1991	What About Bob?	Screenplay by	
1992	Medicine Man	Screenplay by, story by	Co-wrote screenplay with Sally Robinson
1993	Indecent Proposal	Executive producer	
1997	8 Heads in a Duffel Bag	Director, written by	
1998	Holy Man	Written by	
1999	Genius	Executive producer	
2000	Me, Myself & Irene	Executive producer	
2004	Welcome to Mooseport	Screenplay by, producer	
2019	My Dad, Stephanie	Consulting producer	
2022	Double Down South	Director, Written by, Producer	
