= Second Sight (1989 film) =

1989 science fiction black comedy film directed by Joel Zwick

- Theatrical release poster
- Directed by: Joel Zwick
- Written by: Tom Schulman; Patricia Resnick
- Produced by: Mark Tarlov
- Starring: John Larroquette; Bronson Pinchot; Bess Armstrong; Stuart Pankin
- Cinematography: Dana Christiaansen
- Edited by: David Ray
- Music by: John Morris
- Production company: Lorimar Filmed Entertainment
- Distributed by: Warner Bros.
- Release date: November 3, 1989
- Running time: 83 minutes
- Country: United States
- Language: English
- Box office: $5,368,865

Second Sight is a 1989 American science fiction black comedy film from Warner Bros. Pictures starring John Larroquette, Bronson Pinchot, Stuart Pankin, and Bess Armstrong. In the film, a paranormal detective (Larroquette), a psychic (Pinchot), and a nun (Armstrong) search the streets of Boston, Massachusetts for a missing person who has allegedly been kidnapped.

Although scripted by Patricia Resnick (who previously co-wrote 9 to 5) and Oscar-winner Tom Schulman (who won for Dead Poets Society), the film was a critical and commercial failure; it garnered mostly negative reviews and earned only $5.3 million at the United States box office.

== Cast ==
- John Larroquette as Wilbur Wills
- Bronson Pinchot as Bobby McGee
- Bess Armstrong as Kate / Sister Elizabeth
- Stuart Pankin as Dr. Preston Pickett
- John Schuck as Lieutenant "Noogie" Manoogian
- James Tolkan as Captain Coolidge
- Will Le Bow as FBI Agent Alman
- Christine Estabrook as Priscilla Pickett
- Leonard Jackson as Brian, Doorman At Hampshire House
- Marisol Massey as Maria Soledad
- William Prince as Cardinal O'Hara
- Dominic Chianese as Father Dominic
- Michael Lombard as Bishop O'Linn
- Adam LeFevre as Mike
- Ron Taylor as Carl
- Andrew Mutnick as Elmore
- Lucy Johnson as Stripper
- Michelle Fortune as Stripper

== Production ==
Second Sight was being produced around the time of the 1988 Writers Guild of America strike, which led to problems with both the script and the cast. Filming was completed in Boston, Massachusetts. Bronson Pinchot spent about three months meeting with psychics to research for the part, largely with one who was retained by writer Patricia Resnick as a technical advisor for the film. Pinchot said he found that most of them were very straightforward, intelligent and normal people, unlike the quirky and weird character he planned to play; Pinchot said the research was nevertheless helpful in determining how to play the part differently than actual psychics. Pinchot was directed to other psychics by actress Shirley MacLaine, who is well known for her beliefs in new age spirituality and reincarnation; a photo of MacLaine was hung in the bedroom wall of Pinchot's character as an homage. In the middle one of his research sessions, Pinchot collapsed, which doctors said was due to exhaustion but the film's psychic technical advisor believed was due to his response to the extra-sensory perception and hypnosis he had been exposed to over a long period of time.

One psychic Pinchot talked would randomly begin speaking in tongues repeatedly during conversations, which the psychic said was the result of a spiritual sensation he could not explain; Pinchot said the encounter was helpful in establishing his character. During one scene in the movie, Pinchot is in the office of a man who is in another location and has to urinate, and as a result Pinchot's psychic character begins squirming as if he has to use the bathroom. Pinchot said this scene was inspired by a visit he had with a psychic who used to get drunk whenever she was near somebody who was drunk at a party. The character wears slippers throughout the movie because when Pinchot met psychic Peter Hurkos during his research, they went out to lunch and Hurkos wore sandals because he forgot to put on his shoes.

The Aretha Franklin song "Freeway of Love" plays during a chase scene in the middle of the film.

== Reception ==
The film was not successful commercially or critically. It made only $5.3 million at the United States box office, $2.16 million of which were earned during the opening weekend.

Second Sight received mostly negative reviews. Hal Hinson of The Washington Post said it appeared the film "looks as if it was shot on an everything-must-go, discount basis", and that Pinchot's character "is utterly lacking in either charm or wit". Hinson said the dialogue and direction style were terrible and that Larroquette was rehashing his character from the television comedy series, Night Court. The New York Times reviewer Janet Maslin said Joel Zwick's direction "is so outstandingly maladroit (that) it squelches any possible humor". Maslin also said the film featured too many car chases and had such a pacing of such "artificial liveliness from beginning to end" that "there's nothing in the last reel to distinguish it from the first".

== Home video ==
The film was released on VHS in 1990. Some 20 years later, in 2010, Second Sight was released on DVD as a MOD title from the Warner Archive Collection, marking its first release in said format.
