= Hayes Warner =

- Born: July 16, 1999 (age 27)
- Genres: Pop
- Years active: 2024-present
- Label: Glassnote Records
- Website: hayeswarner.com

Hayes Warner is a pop singer and actress based in New York City.

She experienced breakout success in 2024. Her hits include Predator, Oh! and Zip.

In 2024, she performed at Lollapalooza.

Also in 2024, she released a cover of No Doubt's "Just a Girl."

In August 2025, Warner was cast in the FX drama series The Shards, co-created by Ryan Murphy and Bret Easton Ellis and adapted from Ellis's 2023 novel. Warner also contributed original music to the series. Nylon described the role as Warner's first acting credit.

== Discography ==
=== Singles ===
- Just a Girl
- Predator
- Oh!
- Zip
- Breadcrumbs (with Loren Gray)

== Filmography ==
=== Television ===
- The Shards as Debbie Shaffer (2026)
