= Yes, It's the Cathode-Ray Tube Show! =

1957 British TV comedy series

Yes, It's the Cathode-Ray Tube Show! was a British television comedy programme which aired on ITV during 1957. It was produced by Associated-Rediffusion Television. Cast included Peter Sellers, Michael Bentine, David Nettheim, and June Whitfield. Of the six episodes produced, only one episode is known to survive.
