= Welcome to Mooseport =

2004 American film by Donald Petrie

- Theatrical release poster
- Directed by: Donald Petrie
- Screenplay by: Tom Schulman
- Story by: Doug Richardson
- Produced by: Tom Schulman; Marc Frydman; Basil Iwanyk
- Starring: Ray Romano; Gene Hackman; Marcia Gay Harden; Maura Tierney; Christine Baranski; Rip Torn
- Cinematography: Victor Hammer
- Edited by: Debra Neil-Fisher
- Music by: John Debney
- Production company: Intermedia Films
- Distributed by: 20th Century Fox
- Release dates: February 20, 2004 (United States); July 22, 2004 (Germany)
- Running time: 110 minutes
- Countries: United States; Germany
- Language: English
- Budget: $30 million
- Box office: $14.6 million

Welcome to Mooseport is a 2004 political satire comedy film directed by Donald Petrie, and starring Ray Romano and Gene Hackman in his final film role, about a US president who has retired after two terms in office, returns to his hometown of Mooseport, Maine and decides to run for Mayor against another local candidate. It was filmed in Jackson's Point and Port Perry in Ontario. Welcome to Mooseport was released by 20th Century Fox on February 20, 2004, in the United States and on July 22, 2004, in Germany. The film received negative reviews from critics, and was a box-office bomb, grossing $14.6 million against a $30 million budget.

== Plot ==
Former President of the United States Monroe "Eagle" Cole moves to his vacation home in the town of Mooseport, Maine, to escape from his ex-wife Charlotte. Harold "Handy" Harrison is the town's local hardware store owner and plumber. Handy's job keeps him so busy that he has neglected his relationship with his girlfriend and the town veterinarian Sally Mannis, who is on the verge of breakup.

After the mayor dies, the town council decides to approach former president Cole about running for the office. Cole agrees because, if he is mayor, his Mooseport house can serve as his office and, therefore, can no longer be divided up or sold off in his divorce settlement. As a surprise to Cole, Handy's name has also been entered into the race. When Harrison finds out Cole is running, he decides to withdraw, until he witnesses Cole make a pass at Sally. Handy believes that, by becoming mayor, he can show Sally he is a mature decision maker and win back her heart.

Tempers rise following the arrival of Cole's ex-wife and campaign spoiler Charlotte. Cole's team, led by long-time executive secretary Grace Sutherland and presidential aide Will Bullard, bring in strong support in the form of campaign strategist Bert Langdon, who is looking for excitement since Cole's retirement. As the campaigns progress, Cole and Handy both become obsessed with winning the race at all costs, although Handy refuses to resort to cheating. Cole realizes that in all his years of campaigning this may be his toughest as he is taking on a genuinely honest everyman.

On the night before the election, both candidates urge the voters to vote for the other candidate by saying that neither of them will vote for themselves. Handy keeps his promise, but Cole votes for himself. Upon the revelation that Cole won by one vote, his conscience gets the better of him and he concedes the match to Handy. However, Handy lies that he voted for himself as well, and declines office, making Cole end up as mayor. Handy later reveals to Sally that he conceded the election because Cole needs the mayorship more than he does and that all he really wanted was to propose marriage to her, which he does. As Handy is proposing to Sally, Cole also proposes to Grace. Bert tells Handy that he ran an excellent campaign and offers to be his campaign manager for Governor of Maine, which Handy shows some interest in when he realizes a governor has certain authority over mayors.

== Cast ==
- Gene Hackman as Monroe "Eagle" Cole
- Ray Romano as Harold "Handy" Harrison
- Maura Tierney as Dr. Sally Mannis
- Marcia Gay Harden as Grace Sutherland
- Fred Savage as Will Bullard
- Rip Torn as Bert Langdon
- Christine Baranski as Charlotte Cole
- Wayne Robson as Morris Gutman
- Reagan Pasternak as Mandy Gutman
- June Squibb as Irma
- John Rothman as Stu
- Jayne Eastwood as Lucy Decker
- Juan "Chi-Chi" Rodriguez as himself
- Richard Romano as Handy's bar buddy
- Jon Manfrellotti as Reporter
- Edward Herrmann (uncredited) as Avery Hightower

== Production ==
In October 2002, it was announced that Romano and Dustin Hoffman were in negotiations to star in the Rod Lurie directed comedy Mooseport, and written by Tom Schulman for Intermedia Films.

In February 2003, it was announced Lurie had exited the film and negotiations with Hoffman had broken down, leaving Romano still attached and Donald Petrie replacing Lurie. In March 2003, it was announced that Hackman had joined the cast for the film.

== Reception ==
=== Box office ===
The film opened theatrically on February 20, 2004, in 2,868 venues, earning $6,775,132 and ranking fourth in the domestic box office. The film ended its run twelve weeks later on May 13, 2004, having grossed $14,470,947 domestically and $144,152 overseas, for a worldwide total of $14,615,099. Based on a $30 million budget, the film was a box office bomb.

=== Critical response ===
Welcome to Mooseport received negative reviews from critics. On review aggregator website Rotten Tomatoes, the film received a 13% score, based on 143 critics, with an average rating of 4.2/10. The site's consensus states: "A bland comedy that squanders a talented cast." On Metacritic, the film holds a 33 out of 100 rating, based on 36 reviews, indicating "generally unfavorable reviews". Audiences surveyed by CinemaScore gave the film an average grade of "C+" on an A+ to F scale.

James Berardinelli of ReelViews gave the film one and a half stars out of four, saying that "Welcome to Mooseport's satirical edge is dull and pitted, the screenplay is overlong and uninteresting, the comedy is soft and shapeless, and the actors perform like they're on a sitcom. There's not a whole lot to like about Welcome to Mooseport, and, considering how lively real politics can be these days, you're likely to get more entertainment from watching two hours of CSPAN." William Arnold of the Seattle Post-Intelligencer complimented Hackman's "detailed, delightful, comic performance that never quite disintegrates into caricature", but wrote that "the quality of the writing is nowhere near the standard of Hackman's performance, and the movie around him (...) too often substitutes sight gags involving geriatric nudity and fornicating canines for wit." In addition, Arnold felt that Ray Romano "just doesn't have the stuff to bring off a role that requires a Jimmy Stewart or Tom Hanks. He's supposed to be overshadowed by his nemesis, of course, but Hackman chews him up and spits him out so effectively that the movie is glaringly lopsided." Roger Ebert of the Chicago Sun-Times awarded the film three out of four stars, writing:

Whether the movie works or not depends on the charm of the actors. Hackman could charm the chrome off a trailer hitch. Romano is more of the earnest, aw-shucks, sincere, well-meaning kind of guy whose charm is inner and only peeks out occasionally. They work well together here, and Tierney does a heroic job of playing a character who doesn't know how the story will end, when everybody else, in the cast and in the audience, has an excellent idea.
