= Medicine Man (film) =

1992 film by John McTiernan

- Theatrical release poster
- Directed by: John McTiernan
- Screenplay by: Tom Schulman; Sally Robinson
- Story by: Tom Schulman
- Produced by: Donna Dubrow; Andrew G. Vajna
- Starring: Sean Connery; Lorraine Bracco
- Cinematography: Donald McAlpine
- Edited by: Michael R. Miller
- Music by: Jerry Goldsmith
- Production company: Cinergi Pictures
- Distributed by: Buena Vista Pictures Distribution (North and South America) (Note: Distributed under the Hollywood Pictures banner.); Cinergi Productions (under Summit Entertainment; International)
- Release dates: February 5, 1992 (El Capitan Theatre); February 7, 1992 (United States)
- Running time: 106 minutes
- Country: United States
- Language: English
- Budget: $40 million
- Box office: $45 million

Medicine Man is a 1992 American adventure drama film directed by John McTiernan. The film stars Sean Connery and Lorraine Bracco as Robert Campbell and Rae Crane, biochemists working in the Amazon rainforest on a cancer cure, and features an acclaimed score by veteran composer Jerry Goldsmith.

== Plot ==
The pharmaceutical company Aston Laboratories sends biochemist Dr. Rae Crane into the Amazon rainforest to locate researcher Robert Campbell, after his wife (and research partner) abandons him. She brings equipment and supplies, but Campbell is upset the research partner is not forthcoming. He tries to send Crane home but she demurs, as she has been assigned to determine whether Campbell's research deserves continued funding.

Campbell has found a "cure for cancer", but his attempts to synthesize the compound have failed. With supplies of the successful serum running low, he isolates a derivative of a species of flower from which the formula can be synthesized and with Crane's help is determined to find its source. Campbell earns the title "medicine man" of the village by giving a boy with a stomach ache Alka-Seltzer, insulting the real medicine man and driving him deep into the forest. A logging company is building a road headed for the village, threatening to expose the native population to potentially lethal foreign pathogens, as has happened before. In fact, Campbell's wife left him because he could not forgive himself for a previous tragedy.

Imana, a small boy, appears with malignant neoplasms. Campbell, Crane, Imana, and his father Jahausa set out in search of Campbell's predecessor, a medicine man from whom Campbell acquired his knowledge of flowers. Upon encountering the entourage, the medicine man flees in fear. Though he is reluctant to pursue the man further, Crane convinces him circumstances demand that he must. Campbell rescues Crane from a fall, then locates the medicine man, whom he is compelled to fight in order to heal the medicine man's wounded pride and gain information. However, the medicine man reveals that the flowers have no "juju"—power to heal. Jahausa and Imana agree to return another time. Back at the village, Crane initially refuses to allow Campbell to inoculate Imana with the last of the serum until more can be synthesized. But when Imana's condition worsens, she gives in and Imana is inoculated.

The next morning, Imana is better, but the village is in tumult. The logging road is nearly finished. In desperation and after new samples fail to contain the missing compound, Crane runs the chromatograph one more time and accidentally discovers that the source of the cure is not the flower but a species of rare ant indigenous to the rainforest. Campbell demands that the construction stop. A fight results, and a bulldozer catches fire, destroying the village and the research station along with many acres of rainforest.

The next day, Crane promises to send Campbell new equipment and the research assistant he'd originally requested. She is about to return home when she meets the medicine man, who symbolically passes on his mantle to Campbell. Crane accepts an invitation to continue working with Campbell in exchange for recognition for co-discovering the source of the compound.

== Cast ==
- Sean Connery as Dr. Robert Campbell
- Lorraine Bracco as Dr. Rae Crane
- José Wilker as Dr. Miguel Ornega
- Francisco Tsiren Tsere Reneme as Jahausa
- Bec-Kana-Re Dos Santos Kaiapo as Imana
- Angelo Barra Moreira as Medicine Man
- José Lavat as Government Man

== Production ==
John McTiernan and Sean Connery wanted to work on another film together following their collaboration on The Hunt for Red October (1990), and decided on an age-old script entitled Road Show. McTiernan's interest in the material stemmed from a desire to make a film that would be similar in nature to that of The Quiet Man (1952), directed by John Ford, in which the two main leads, John Wayne and Maureen O'Hara, are constantly at odds with each other and attempt to one-up and dominate one another throughout the film. While McTiernan eventually opted to make Medicine Man instead, upon receiving an offer from Cinergi, his original intentions were never fully realized.

In order to cast someone that would match Connery's masculinity, McTiernan sought out Swedish actress Lena Olin for the female lead Dr. Rae Crane because "she was strong and she was very smart." Connery, however, disapproved of Olin, worried that having her co-star opposite him would result in her stealing his prowess. McTiernan explained:

"Sean had come through all the Bond movies. The Bond movies are terribly misogynistic. [...] Sean came from that school, and he sort of learned, well, you know, you make sure that the woman can't steal the movie from you. [...] Somehow, I couldn't convince him. I couldn't make him see that the only way the movie works is if you don't get the little woman who's gorgeous—like in a Bond movie—you gotta get a woman who's as big as you are! You've got to get Sean Connery: the female, Sean Connery: with breasts! I didn't know how to convince him, and I failed."

Lorraine Bracco was cast opposite Connery instead and principal photography began on March 4, 1991 in the Mexican jungle near Catemaco and was completed in July. Connery and Bracco both complained of conditions on set. Tom Schulman's script was purchased for $2.5 million with a further $1 million spent on rewrites by Sally Robinson and Tom Stoppard.

== Soundtrack ==
Medicine Man

Film score by Jerry Goldsmith
- Released: February 4, 1994
- Recorded: 1994
- Genre: Soundtrack
- Length: 50:09

The music for Medicine Man was composed and conducted by veteran composer Jerry Goldsmith. The score, a blend of orchestra, synthetic elements and guitar solos, was praised by critics and is considered one of the film's strengths. The soundtrack was released February 4, 1994 through Varèse Sarabande and features fourteen tracks.

1. "Rae's Arrival" (5:06)
2. "First Morning" (3:46)
3. "Campbell and the Children" (1:57)
4. "The Trees" (6:01)
5. "The Harvest" (3:11)
6. "Mocara" (3:36)
7. "Mountain High" (2:41)
8. "Without a Net" (4:19)
9. "Finger Painting" (2:30)
10. "What's Wrong" (1:52)
11. "The Injection" (2:09)
12. "The Sugar" (2:08)
13. "The Fire" (2:10)
14. "A Meal and a Bath" (8:03)

== Reception ==
=== Box office ===
The film premiered at the El Capitan Theatre in Los Angeles on February 5, 1992. It was released in 1,304 theatres on February 7, 1992. The film debuted at number 1 at the US box office with $8.5 million. The following week it was knocked out of the top spot by Wayne's World. The film eventually grossed $45.5 million domestically, earning Disney $21 million, just half of its budget.

=== Critical response ===
The film was panned by most critics, several of whom chastised Bracco's performance. On Rotten Tomatoes, the film has an approval rating of 17% rating based on 23 reviews. On Metacritic, it has a weighted average score of 43 out of 100 based on reviews from 25 critics, indicating "mixed or average" reviews. Audiences surveyed by CinemaScore gave the film a grade of "B+" on scale of A+ to F.

Roger Ebert of the Chicago Sun-Times gave it 1.5 out of 4 and wrote: "All of the elements are here for a movie I would probably enjoy very much, but somehow they never come together" and "If this had been some dumb adventure movie, it would probably have been terrific." Owen Gleiberman of Entertainment Weekly wrote "It's not every day you get to see a performance as bad as Lorraine Bracco's in Medicine Man" and Connery "doesn’t do much he hasn't done before". Gleiberman praised some moments in which the film "becomes the dazzling true-life jungle saga it clearly wants to be" but is critical of the plot which he says is "built around some very tired devices" and "The race-against-the-clock structure is a flimsy conceit". He gave it a grade C+.Variety called it "An indelicate attempt to create some African Queen-style magic while curing cancer and saving the rainforests in the bargain, this jumbo-budget two-character piece suffers from a very weak script and a lethal job of miscasting."

About the film's lackluster performance, John McTiernan said: "It was a little art movie with Sean Connery that cost only $27 million. If the press hadn't defined it as an action movie, it probably wouldn't have been considered a disappointment." Lorraine Bracco's performance in the film, as well as Traces of Red, earned her a nomination for the Golden Raspberry Award for Worst Actress at the 13th Golden Raspberry Awards.

== See also ==
- Richard Evans Schultes, an American ethnobotanist who conducted inaugural research in the Amazon rainforest
