= Owen Painter =

American actor (born 1997)

- Born: November 6, 1997 (age 29); West Hartford, Connecticut, U.S.
- Education: Chapman University
- Occupation: Actor
- Years active: 2021–present

Owen Nash Painter (born November 6, 1997) is an American actor who is best known for his role as Isaac Night/Slurp in the Netflix series Wednesday.

== Early life ==
Painter was born on November 6, 1997, in West Hartford, Connecticut. He did several theatre roles in town, including Mel Beineke in Conard High School's 2016 production of The Addams Family musical, and Lumiere in the 2016 West Hartford Summer Arts Festival presentation of Beauty and the Beast.

In 2020, he received his Bachelor of Fine Arts in Screen Acting from Chapman University in Orange, California. While studying at Chapman, Painter received the Department of Theatre's award for Outstanding Performance in a One-Act Play for his role as Tate in the student production "Way Deep."

== Career ==
In 2021, he made his film acting debut in the short film "Soup." In 2022, he starred in an episode of the television series The Handmaid's Tale. The following year, he received a recurring role as the younger Lucas in seven episodes of the miniseries Tiny Beautiful Things, whose alter ego was played by Nick Stahl. In 2025, he was seen in the second season of the Netflix original series Wednesday, initially as the zombie "Slurp," who regains his human appearance as Isaac Night over the course of the story.

On April 6, 2026, Deadline announced that Owen Painter had been cast in Roxy Sorkin's feature directorial debut, Hot Year, a coming-of-age revenge thriller, and the Ryan Murphy-produced erotic/psychological thriller series The Shards.

In August 2026, Painter expanded into stage work, starring alongside David Iacono, Jack Dylan Grazer, and Laurie Hernandez in an exclusive New York City industry reading of Makaio Toft's play Heat, directed by Mack Brown.

On October 22, 2026, Deadline announced that Owen Painter had been cast as a series regular in Season 2 of the Ryan Murphy-produced Netflix series The Watcher.

== Public appearances ==
On September 14, 2025, Painter attended Netflix's Emmy Celebration at NYA WEST in Hollywood, Los Angeles. On November 19, 2025, he attended Swedish singer Robyn's concert performance presented by Spotify and Acne Studios at the Fonda Theatre in Los Angeles.

On August 25, 2026, Painter made a public appearance at the US Open Fan Week at the USTA Billie Jean King National Tennis Center in Flushing, New York, attending matches alongside The Shards co-stars Kaia Gerber and Homer Gere.

On September 29, 2026, Painter made his Paris Fashion Week debut at the Dior Spring/Summer 2027 Womenswear presentation held at Le Bassin Octogonal in the Jardin des Tuileries. He wore an olive-colored Dior Menswear ensemble designed by Jonathan Anderson from the brand's Spring 2027 Menswear collection. During the event, he sat in the front row alongside Hyunjin, Helen Lasichanh, and Pharrell Williams.

On October 4, 2026, he attended the premiere of Columbia Pictures' The Social Reckoning at the Regal Union Square in New York City. Painter attended the screening in support of writer-director Roxy Sorkin, having been cast in her feature directorial debut, the revenge thriller Hot Year.

== Filmography ==
Key
†	Denotes films that have not yet been released

=== Film ===
Film appearances
Year	Title	Role	Notes	Ref.
2021	"Soup"	Young Lawrence	Short film	
TBA	Hot Year †		Post-production	

=== Television ===
Television appearances
Year	Title	Role	Notes	Ref.
2022	The Handmaid's Tale	Jaden	Season 5; Episode: “Fairytale”	
2023	Tiny Beautiful Things	Young Lucas	Recurring role; season 1	
2025	Wednesday	Isaac Night/Slurp	Main role; season 2	
2026	The Shards	Matthew Kellner	Recurring role	
TBA	The Watcher		Main role; season 2	
