= The Shards =

2023 novel by Bret Easton Ellis

- First edition cover
- Author: Bret Easton Ellis
- Audio read by: Bret Easton Ellis
- Language: English
- Genre: Autofiction; metafiction; horror; Gothic; thriller; coming of age
- Publisher: Alfred A. Knopf
- Publication date: January 17, 2023
- Publication place: New York
- Media type: Print (Hardcover)
- Pages: 608
- ISBN: 978-0-593-53560-8
- Dewey Decimal: 813/.54
- LC Class: PS3555.L5937 S53 2023

The Shards is a 2023 autofiction/horror novel by American author Bret Easton Ellis, published on January 17, 2023, by Alfred A. Knopf. Ellis's first novel in 13 years, The Shards is a fictionalized memoir of Ellis's final year of high school in 1981 in Los Angeles. It was first serialized by Ellis as an audiobook through his podcast on Patreon.

The novel's narrator, Bret, relates the story of the events of his senior year of high school in 1981, of his and his close circle of friends' acquaintance with new student Robert Mallory and the tragedy that followed. The novel is both autofiction and metafiction.

== Plot summary ==
At the start of their senior year, Bret Easton Ellis and his peers at the Buckley School are the children of prominent Hollywood figures. Living in the Hollywood Hills, they have easy access to drugs, luxury cars, and lavish parties.

When new student Robert Mallory first arrives at Buckley, Bret is sure that he saw him at a movie theater months before. However, Robert denies this. He claims to have previously spent time in a psychiatric facility, and Bret distrusts him because of this. Bret soon starts believing that Robert is responsible for the murders of the "Trawler", a serial killer who has been targeting mainly female teenagers in the Los Angeles area.

The Trawler's victims first find that furniture has been mysteriously rearranged in their homes, then their pets disappear and they receive phone calls with hang-ups, before they are abducted, mutilated and killed. Their corpses and those of their pets are later found made up into an "assemblage". The Trawler is thought to be connected to the Riders of the Afterlife, a Satanic cult.

Bret's circle of friends, which includes the homecoming king and queen—Thom and his girlfriend, Susan—welcome Robert into their circle and trust him, despite Bret's insistence that he is a psychotic liar. These accusations fall on deaf ears, and Bret's girlfriend, Debbie, believes he is imagining things. Bret is gay but passes as straight. He is eventually lured to a hotel suite by Debbie's father, Terry, a powerful film producer who claims that he will help Bret with writing a script for a teen film. Instead, he takes sexual advantage of Bret.

Bret becomes distant from Debbie as he engages in casual sex with two of his classmates, Matt and Ryan. Matt's pets vanish, and he later finds the furniture in his house rearranged. Matt then goes missing, and his body is later discovered in an arrangement with the corpses of his pets. The police rule this to have been an accidental death by misadventure involving heavy drug use, but Bret suspects otherwise when Matt's father shows him pictures of the crime scene.

Meanwhile, Robert claims that he is being stalked. Bret discovers that Susan is cheating on Thom with Robert, and their secret affair eventually blows up. Debbie begins to receive silent phone calls, and her horse is found mutilated and killed. She is later attacked in her swimming pool by an unseen assailant, whom she escapes from.

After an attack on Susan and Thom by a masked man, who flees after Susan bites into his arm, Bret goes to Robert's penthouse, seals the door to the unit, unplugs the phones, and grabs a kitchen knife to confront him. In the ensuing fight, Robert falls to his death, which is ruled a suicide based on Bret's account of events.

Police discover the remains of one of the Trawler's victims in a house in Benedict Canyon belonging to Robert's uncle, at which Robert frequently stayed. Bret gains celebrity status at school due to having apparently caught the serial killer. However, the Trawler claims another victim. A note sent by the killer reveals that they were not Robert at all but committed the killings as an act of sacrifice to Robert, whom they named "the God". Despite admitting to all the killings, they deny any involvement in the attack on Thom and Susan and declare that now that their "God" is dead, this will be their last killing. Nothing more is heard from the Trawler.

Bret's reputation and popularity plummet as his story is proven false. After noticing a bite mark on Bret's arm in the exact place she bit her assailant, Susan comes to believe he attacked her and Thom.

Two decades later, Thom attends a book signing by Bret, now a famous author, and asks if it was he who attacked Susan and himself that night. Bret denies this and speculates that it was the Trawler in an unsuccessful killing attempt. The novel's ending is ambiguous, leaving the identity of the Trawler, Susan and Thom's attacker, the exact nature of Robert's death, and Bret's account of the whole ordeal open to debate.

== Publication ==
The Shards was first serialized as an audiobook read by Ellis through his podcast on Patreon. The audio serial was published in twenty-seven individual installments, released between September 6, 2020, and September 6, 2021.

On December 1, 2021, Ellis announced on Instagram that the manuscript of The Shards had just arrived for him to look over. In May 2022, pre-orders for the book were made available. It was published by Alfred A. Knopf on January 17, 2023.

== Reception ==
Reviewing the audiobook for The Times in 2021, Theo Zenou called it Ellis's "weirdest, most interesting work in years" and felt it was "rendered all the more absorbing" by the audiobook format.

Kirkus Reviews wrote, "The usual issues with Ellis apply to this bulky novel: The flatness of the characters, the gratuitousness of the violence, the Didion-esque cool that sometimes reads as Olympian smugness. But as the story proceeds, it also becomes easier to admire Ellis' ability to sustain the mood."

Publishers Weekly wrote that the book "feels like two disparate novels—an overly detailed, fictionalized memoir and a high gothic serial killer thriller—that never come together meaningfully or believably".

Melissa Broder said in The New York Times that the book "invit[es] the reader more profoundly into the emotional realm of the protagonist" than Ellis's earlier works. She also observed that while the length and looping narrative helped build suspense, "the reader wonders if the book could have been shorter and still achieved the same psychedelic, collage-like effect". Broder concluded that "the novel's climax and denouement ultimately fall flat".

== Television adaptation ==
The series adaptation of the novel was ordered by FX. It was created by Ryan Murphy and the novel's author Ellis himself. The cast is led by Igby Rigney, Homer Gere, Graham Campbell, Hayes Warner, and Kaia Gerber. The series premiered on August 5, 2026.
