= Before Your Very Eyes =

Play by gob squad

Before Your Very Eyes was a play created by German-British team gob squad. It was originally performed in Europe, then reopened in America at New York City's The Public Theater in October 2015.

== Plot ==
This show looks at views of life and death, from a child's perspective. A team of 7 children, (there were 2 groups of 7 children), are sat in a box made of one way mirrors, where they age until death.

== Cast ==
American production: Team A- Mikai Anthony, Eloise Celine, Margalit Duclayan, Jasper Newell, Maeve Press, Matthew Quirk, Aja Nicole Webber Team 1- Rose Bell-McKinley, Miles Sherr-Garcia, Simone Mindolovich, Elijah Pluchino, Charlotte Beede, Meghan Chang, Keanu Jacobs

== Notes ==
For the Catchphrase "Before your very eyes" see English comedian and actor Arthur Askey.
