= Igby Rigney =

American actor

- Born: June 6, 2003 (age 23); Ossining, New York
- Occupation: Actor
- Years active: 2018–present

Igby Rigney is an American actor. He is known for his collaborations with filmmaker Mike Flanagan, appearing in the Netflix series Midnight Mass (2021), The Midnight Club (2022), and The Fall of the House of Usher (2023). In 2026, he began starring as a fictionalized teenage Bret Easton Ellis in the FX television adaptation of Ellis's novel The Shards.

== Early life and education ==
Rigney is from Ossining, New York, in Westchester County. He attended Pace University in New York, where he studied film and psychology.

== Career ==
Rigney made an early television appearance in a 2018 episode of the CBS police drama Blue Bloods. He subsequently appeared in the films Joe Bell and F9, portraying a young version of Jesse in the latter.

In 2021, Rigney began a recurring collaboration with filmmaker Mike Flanagan when he portrayed Warren Flynn in the Netflix horror miniseries Midnight Mass. He later played Kevin, one of the principal characters in Flanagan and Leah Fong's 2022 series The Midnight Club. Discussing how he came to work repeatedly with Flanagan, Rigney said that he initially auditioned by self-tape for a role he believed he had little chance of receiving, after which Flanagan continued casting him in subsequent projects. Flanagan has described maintaining a recurring group of actors across his productions and cited Rigney as one of the performers who moved between Midnight Mass, The Midnight Club, and The Fall of the House of Usher. Rigney reunited with Flanagan for The Fall of the House of Usher, released in 2023, in which he portrayed Toby. His other work during this period included appearances in The Sex Lives of College Girls and the film Double Down South.

In 2025, Rigney was cast as a fictionalized 17-year-old version of author Bret Easton Ellis in The Shards, an FX adaptation of Ellis's 2023 semi-autobiographical novel developed by Ellis and Ryan Murphy. The series premiered in August 2026. The role marked Rigney's first major television lead. In the series, Rigney's Ellis serves as the narrator and central character, an aspiring writer in early-1980s Los Angeles who becomes increasingly preoccupied with a series of murders and with a new student at his school. Rigney's performance received critical attention. Writing in The New Yorker, Leo Lasdun described him as the "standout" of the ensemble and noted that his delivery recalled Ellis's own speaking voice. The New York Times television critic James Poniewozik described Rigney's character as the audience's guide through the series and noted the character's distinctive narration.

== Filmography ==
=== Film ===
Year	Title	Role	Notes
2021	Joe Bell	Chance	
2021	F9	Young Jesse	
2022	Double Down South	Little Nick	
2023	Out of My Comfort Zone	Brad	
2026	Premarital	Clark Whtaker	

=== Television ===
Year	Title	Role	Notes
2018	Blue Bloods	Evan Scott	Episode: "Risk Management"
2021	Midnight Mass	Warren Flynn	Main role; 7 episodes
2022	The Midnight Club	Kevin	Main role; 10 episodes
2022	The Sex Lives of College Girls	Wes	Episode: "The Short King"
2023	The Fall of the House of Usher	Toby	Recurring role; 3 episodes
2025	Grey’s Anatomy	Dr. Scott Marcus	Guest role; 2 episodes
2025	Devil in Disguise: John Wayne Gacy	Phil	Episode: "Billy and Dale"
2026	The Shards	Bret Easton Ellis	Lead role; 9 episodes
