= Edie McClurg =

American retired actress (born 1945)

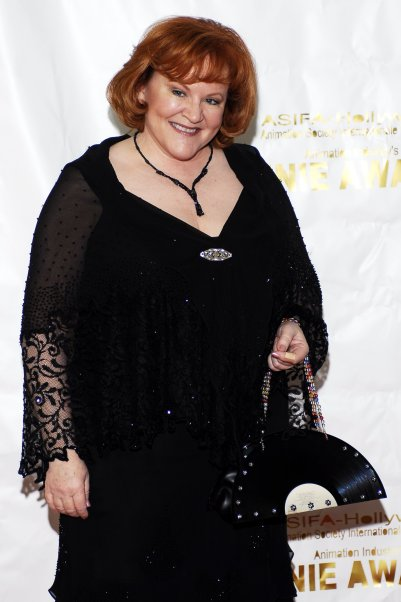
- McClurg at the 34th Annie Awards, 2007
- Born: July 23, 1945 (age 81); Kansas City, Missouri, U.S.
- Education: University of Missouri–Kansas City (B.A.); Syracuse University (M.S.)
- Occupations: Actress; comedian
- Years active: 1976–2022
- Relatives: Angelique Cabral (first cousin once removed)

Edie McClurg (born July 23, 1945) is an American retired actress and comedian. She has played supporting roles in the films Carrie (1976), Ferris Bueller's Day Off (1986), and Elvira: Mistress of the Dark (1988) and bit parts in Cheech and Chong's Next Movie (1980), Mr. Mom (1983) Back to School (1986), Planes, Trains and Automobiles (1987), A River Runs Through It (1992), Natural Born Killers (1994), Flubber (1997) and Air Bud: Spikes Back (2003).

On television, McClurg had a recurring role on WKRP in Cincinnati as Herb Tarlek's wife, Lucille. She regularly performed on The David Letterman Show, before playing Bonnie Brindle in Small Wonder (1985–1987) and Mrs. Patty Poole on The Hogan Family (1986–1991). As a one-off character, she appeared in Alice, Mr. Belvedere, Roseanne, Full House, Seinfeld, Sabrina the Teenage Witch, Malcolm in the Middle, Hannah Montana, Crashbox and Portlandia. She has additionally appeared in numerous commercials.

As a voice actress, she played in The Secret of NIMH (1982), The Little Mermaid (1989), A Bug's Life (1998), the first two films of the Cars franchise (2006-2011) and Wreck-It Ralph (2012), as well as in Snorks (1984–1988), Life with Louie (1995–1998) and Violet Bleakman in Clifford the Big Red Dog (2000–2003).

== Early life and education ==
McClurg was born and raised in Kansas City, Missouri, to LaVerne Charles “Mac” McClurg, a mailman, and Mabel “Irene” Josephine Hawkins, an FAA secretary. She had an older brother, Bob (Robert), who was an actor and comedian. She attended twelve years of Catholic elementary and high school, then the University of Missouri–Kansas City in the mid-1960s where she got her BA in 1967 and where she also taught radio for eight years. She earned a master's degree from Syracuse University in 1970.

At the University of Missouri–Kansas City, McClurg re-entered the entertainment field as a DJ, newswoman, and producer for the NPR affiliate KCUR-FM. There she portrayed John Ehrlichman in Conversation 26 of NPR's national broadcast of the Nixon Tape transcript.

== Career ==
While visiting her actor brother Robert in San Francisco, McClurg was asked to participate in an impromptu stage performance by the Pitschel Players. She soon joined the cast and moved to Los Angeles.

After the Pitschel Players, she joined the Groundlings improv troupe. She worked with fellow Groundling player Paul Reubens on his first play The Pee-wee Herman Show, in which she appeared in 1981 as "Hermit Hattie". She also appeared in the 1988 film Elvira: Mistress of the Dark with fellow Groundling player Cassandra Peterson, who appeared as her alter ego Elvira.

=== Early roles ===
McClurg's screen debut was as Helen Shyres in Brian De Palma's 1976 horror film Carrie starring Sissy Spacek. She was a comedy regular on the Tony Orlando and Dawn variety show (1976–1977) and then a cast member of The Kallikaks and The Richard Pryor Show. In 1980, McClurg regularly performed on The David Letterman Show as Mrs. Marv Mendenhall. She went on to appear in almost 90 films and 55 television episodes, usually typecast as a middle-aged, somewhat stubborn, and dim-witted Midwesterner.

=== Television ===
On television, she played Lucille Tarlek on WKRP in Cincinnati (1979–1980), Willamae Jones in the television remake of Harper Valley PTA (1981), Mrs. Patty Poole on The Hogan Family (originally "Valerie") (1986–1991), Bonnie Brindle on Small Wonder (1985–1987), and Mrs. Beeker on 7th Heaven (1996–2006).

McClurg had numerous appearances on other television programs. She portrayed one of the wicked stepsisters in the Faerie Tale Theatre television production Cinderella. She portrayed a nurse nicknamed "Angel of Death" in an episode of The Golden Girls. She guest-starred in episodes of Alice, The Jeffersons, Diff'rent Strokes, Mr. Belvedere, Roseanne, Full House, Seinfeld, Melrose Place, Touched by an Angel, Married... with Children, Caroline in the City, Sabrina the Teenage Witch, Malcolm in the Middle, Portlandia, Rules of Engagement, and Two and a Half Men among others. She appeared in an episode of Hannah Montana as Cindy Merriweather. She guest starred as Barri's mother in an episode of Campus Ladies. McClurg also appeared on several game shows, including Match Game, The $25,000 Pyramid, Password Plus, and Super Password, and appeared in numerous commercials.

=== Film ===
McClurg also played in a number of films including Helen Shyres in Carrie (1976), Gloria's Mom in Cheech and Chong's Next Movie (1980), the check out lady in Mr. Mom (1983), Grace in Ferris Bueller's Day Off (1986), Marge Sweetwater in Back to School (1986), the car rental agent in Planes, Trains and Automobiles (1987), Lynn in She's Having a Baby (1988), a secretary in Curly Sue (1991), Mrs. Burns in A River Runs Through It (1992), Heather Wilson in Natural Born Killers (1994), Martha George in Flubber (1997), Esther in Hanging Up (2000), Gram Gram in Air Bud: Spikes Back (2003), and Mrs. Gertrude in Dickie Roberts: Former Child Star (2003).

=== Animation ===
McClurg is also known for a number of animated roles. She voiced Miss Right in The Secret of NIMH (1982), Barsa in Kiki's Delivery Service (1989), Carlotta in The Little Mermaid (1989) and The Little Mermaid II: Return to the Sea (2000), a nurse in The Rugrats Movie (1998), Dr. Flora in A Bug's Life (1998), Molly in Home on the Range (2004), Minny in Cars (2006) and Cars 2 (2011), Mary in Wreck-It Ralph (2012), and Gerda in Frozen (2013). She also voiced the offscreen "Polite Female Voice" in the Revolting Slob segments on Crashbox, Fran on Higglytown Heroes, the Dragon in the Nightmare Ned video game, Mrs. Claus in Holidaze: The Christmas That Almost Didn't Happen, Grandma Taters in The Adventures of Jimmy Neutron, Boy Genius, Violet Stimpleton in Rocket Power, Bea's mother in Fish Hooks, Winnie Pig in Tiny Toon Adventures: How I Spent My Vacation, Mrs. Violet Bleakman on Clifford the Big Red Dog, Bobby's teacher in Bobby's World, and Trudi Traveler in an episode of Wander Over Yonder. McClurg contributed assorted voices for The Jetsons, The Snorks and Life with Louie.

=== Stage ===
- 2003: It's Edie in Here (solo show), Groundlings Theatre, West Hollywood, CA.
- Whirly June: A Midwestern Woman (solo show), Zephyr Theatre, Hollywood, CA.

=== Other roles ===
Continuing her passion for performing improvised comedy, McClurg studied improvisation with Viola Spolin, and became a player with Spolin Players. On April 9, 2007, she made an appearance on Thank God You're Here.

In 2020, she made a cameo in the Family Guy episode "Holly Bibble" in a spoof of Ferris Bueller's Day Off. She appeared as 'Grace', personal assistant to [Carter as] Pontius Pilate. Immediately following the delivery of her lines, was the following acknowledgment by Carter/Pontius' character, "Wasn't that cool? That was really her! Edie McClurg. Thanks Edie!".

== Personal life ==
In 2019, TMZ reported that family and friends of McClurg filed court documents requesting a conservatorship to manage her affairs. They said neurological tests provide evidence that McClurg is unable to live alone without assistance and is "especially vulnerable to undue influence, given her poor judgment and evident dementia". TMZ further reported that a conservator, McClurg's cousin, Angelique Cabral, had been appointed.

In August 2022, the lawyer for the conservatorship filed court documents alleging that McClurg had been abused by a man who had befriended her, moved into her home, and became a court-approved caregiver. The documents allege the man sexually assaulted her and a police report had been filed by the Los Angeles Police Department. They further allege that the man tried to remove her from the state to marry her. The judge for the conservatorship granted an order of protection at hearings in September 2022.

== Filmography ==
=== Film ===
Year	Title	Role	Notes
1976	Carrie	Helen Shyres	Film debut
1977	Cracking Up	—N/a	
1980	Cheech and Chong's Next Movie	Gloria's Mom	
1980	Oh, God! Book II	Mr. Benson's Secretary	
1982	Eating Raoul	Susan	
1982	Pandemonium	Blue's Mom	
1982	The Secret of NIMH	Miss Right	Voice
1983	Mr. Mom	Check Out Lady	
1984	Cheech & Chong's The Corsican Brothers	The Queen	
1986	The Longshot	Donna	
1986	Ferris Bueller's Day Off	Grace Wheelberg	
1986	Back to School	Marge Sweetwater	
1987	Planes, Trains and Automobiles	Car Rental Agent	
1988	She's Having a Baby	Lynn	
1988	Elvira: Mistress of the Dark	Chastity Pariah	
1989	Kiki's Delivery Service	Barsa	Voice, 1998 Disney English dub
1989	The Little Mermaid	Carlotta	Voice
1991	Curly Sue	Secretary	
1992	Tiny Toon Adventures: How I Spent My Vacation	Winnie Pig	Voice, direct-to-video
1992	A River Runs Through It	Mrs. Burns	
1993	Stepmonster	Dr. Emmerson	Direct-to-video
1993	Airborne	Irene Metzner	
1994	Natural Born Killers	Mrs. Heather Wilson	
1995	Under the Hula Moon	Dolly	
1996	Carpool	Mrs. Laszlo	Voice
1997	Casper: A Spirited Beginning	Librarian	
1997	Flubber	Martha George	
1998	Ted	Mother	
1998	Holy Man	Laundry Lady #2	
1998	The Rugrats Movie	Nurse	Voice
1998	A Bug's Life	Dr. Flora	Voice
1999	Can't Stop Dancing	Beverly McGuire	
1999	The Manor	Mrs. Ellen French	Based on the play Ravenscroft
1999	My Neighbors the Yamadas	Noboru's teacher	Voice, Disney English dub
2000	Hanging Up	Esther	
2000	Meeting Daddy	Dot	
2000	The Little Mermaid II: Return to the Sea	Carlotta	Voice, direct-to-video
2002	Van Wilder	Campus Tour Guide	
2002	Changing Hearts	Nurse Rollins	
2002	The Master of Disguise	Mother Disguisey	
2002	Now You Know	Pat	
2003	Air Bud: Spikes Back	Gram Gram	Direct-to-video
2003	Dickie Roberts: Former Child Star	Mrs. Gertrude	
2003	Fish Without a Bicycle	Greta	
2004	To Kill a Mockumentary	Estelle	Direct-to-video
2004	Home on the Range	Mollie the pig	Voice
2004	Breaking Dawn	Nurse Olivia	
2004	Mickey's Twice Upon a Christmas	Santa's Workshop Announcer	Voice, direct-to-video
2006	Cars	Minny	Voice
2006	Scooby-Doo! Pirates Ahoy!	Peggy Jones, Sea Salt Sally	Voice, direct-to-video
2007	Simple Things	Maggie Perkins	
2009	Fired Up!	Ms. Tanya Klingerhoff	
2010	Holyman Undercover	Martha	
2011	Cars 2	Minny	Voice
2012	Foodfight!	Mrs. Butterworth	Voice
2012	Wreck-It Ralph	Mary	Voice
2013	Frozen	Gerda	Voice
2014	A Long Way Off	Mrs. Evelyn Grey	
2016	Theresa Is a Mother	Cloris McDermott	
2016	Zootopia	ADR Group	Voice, uncredited
2022	Eyes Upon Waking	Nurse Jane	

=== Television ===
Year	Title	Role	Notes
1976	Tony Orlando and Dawn	—N/a	Regular
1977	The Kallikaks	Venus Kallikak	5 episodes
1977	The Richard Pryor Show	Various roles	4 episodes (including 2 uncredited)
1978	ABC Afterschool Special	Esther Greene	Episode: "A Home Run for Love"
1979	Hello, Larry	—N/a	Episode: "The Trip"
1979	Scooby-Doo and Scrappy-Doo	—N/a	Unknown episodes
1979–1980	WKRP in Cincinnati	Lucille Tarlek	3 episodes
1979, 1984	Diff'rent Strokes	Betty	2 episodes
1981	Harper Valley PTA	Willamae Jones	12 episodes
1981	The Incredible Hulk	Sister Mary Catherine	Episode: "Sanctuary"
1982	Alice	Imogene	Episode: "Sharples vs. Sharples"
1982	American Playhouse	Switchboard Operator	Episode: "Working"
1982	No Soap, Radio	Marion	5 episodes
1982	Madame's Place	Solaria	6 episodes
1982	The Jeffersons	Audrey Blume	Episode: "Death Smiles on a Dry Cleaner"
1983	The Lost Satellite	Various roles	Unknown episodes
1983	The Dukes	—N/a	13 episodes
1983	We Got It Made	Louise	Episode: "Am I Blue?"
1984	Snorks	Mrs. Seabottom, Tara Seaworthy	Voice, unknown episodes
1984	Trapper John, M.D.	Kathleen Wheeler	Episode: "Promises, Promises"
1985	The Jeffersons	Woman on TV	Episode: "And Up We Go"
1985	Faerie Tale Theatre	Bertha	Episode: "Cinderella"
1985	The Jetsons		Episode: "Elroy in Wonderland"
1985	The 13 Ghosts of Scooby-Doo	Telula, Selma	Voice, 2 episodes
1985–1987	Small Wonder	Bonnie Brindle	12 episodes
1986	Moonlighting	Beauty Salon Customer	Episode: "Camille"
1986	Together We Stand	Fannie	Episode: "Pilot"
1986	Mr. Belvedere	Penny Nichols	Episode: "Reunion"
1986–1991	Valerie/The Hogan Family	Mrs. Patty Poole	88 episodes
1990	Timeless Tales from Hallmark	Mathilda	Voice, episode: "The Emperor's New Clothes"
1990	Gravedale High	—N/a	Unknown episode(s)
1990, 1992	Tom & Jerry Kids	Various roles	Voice, 2 episodes
1990–1993	Bobby's World	Aunt Ruth Generic	Voice, 5 episodes
1991	Darkwing Duck	—N/a	Episode: "Trading Faces"
1991	The Golden Girls	Nurse DeFarge	Episode: "Beauty and the Beast"
1991	The New WKRP in Cincinnati	Lucille Tarlek	Episode: "Lotto Fever"
1991–1992	Drexell's Class	Principal Marilyn Ridge	17 episodes
1991–1992	Tiny Toon Adventures	Winnie Pig	Voice, 2 episodes
1992–1993	The Addams Family	Mrs. Normanmeyer	Voice, 11 episodes
1992	Roseanne	Harriet	Episode: "Bingo"
1992	Dinosaurs	Shopper	Voice, episode: "Power Erupts"
1992	Goof Troop	Jea	Voice, episode: "Meanwhile, Back at the Ramp"
1992	Full House	Jungle Jenny	Episode: "Radio Days"
1993	Seinfeld	Mrs. Oliver	Episode: "The Old Man"
1993	Problem Child	—N/a	Unknown episode(s)
1993	Getting By	Lilah	Episode: "The Pit Stop"
1994	Monty	God	Episode: "Death in Plain View"
1994	The Mommies	Nurse Judy	Episode: "Bringing Home Baby"
1994	Adventures in Wonderland	The Eye Doctor	Episode: "Those Tusks, Those Eyes"
1994	L.A. Law	Cille Vonzel	Episode: "Whose San Andreas Fault Is it, Anyway?"
1995	A.J.'s Time Travelers	Marie Curie	Episode: "Marie Curie"
1995	Aaahh!!! Real Monsters	Mom	Voice, episode: "Simon Strikes Back/The Ickis Box"
1995	Empty Nest	Peggy Prockett	Episode: "Stand by Your Man"
1995–1998	Life with Louie	Ora Anderson	Voice, 39 episodes
1996	Night Stand with Dick Dietrick	Mabel	Episode: "Uniting Loved Ones"
1996	Local Heroes	Mrs. Jen Penny	Episode: "Eddie's Secret"
1996	Picket Fences	Mother Dinkle	Episode: "Snow Exit"
1996	The Spooktacular New Adventures of Casper	Willa Winkle	Voice, episode: "Three Ghosts and a Baby/I Wanna Be Rude/Leave It to Casper"
1996	Homeboys in Outer Space	Demille	Episode: "A Man's Place is in the Homey, or The Stepford Guys"
1996–2006	7th Heaven	Mrs. Beeker	6 episodes
1997	Touched by an Angel	Loafer	Episode: "Last Call"
1997	Melrose Place	Hilda Morris	3 episodes
1997	Married... with Children	Mrs. Emy Tot	Episode: "How to Marry a Moron"
1997	Perversions of Science	The Farmer's Wife	Episode: "Panic"
1997	Nash Bridges	Nurse Debbie	Episode: "One Flew Over the Cuda's Nest"
1997	Sabrina, the Teenage Witch	Maw Maw	Episode: "Witch Trash"
1998	The Lionhearts	Betty	Voice, episode: "But Some of My Best Friends are Clowns"
1998	Columbo	Mrs. Kate Lerby	Episode: "Ashes to Ashes"
1998	Maggie Winters	Arlene	Episode: "Suburban Myth"
1998–1999	Caroline in the City	Margaret Duffy	3 episodes
1999	Mad About You	Rosie	Episode: "Uncle Phil Goes Back to High School"
1999	Cow and Chicken	Sis, Lunch Lady	Voice, episode: "Snail Boy/The Penalty Wheel"
1999	Nash Bridges	Bridgit	Episode: "Trade Off"
1999	Oh Yeah! Cartoons	Ms. Jane Davis	Voice, episode: "Terry & Chris"
1999–2000	Crashbox	Female Polite Voice	Recurring role
1999–2000	The Kids from Room 402	Mrs. Nadia McCoy	Voice, 6 episodes
1999–2004	Rocket Power	Violet Stimpleton	Voice, 21 episodes
2000	CatDog	Mrs. Julie Grock	Voice, episode: "A Dog Ate My Homework/The End"
2000	Batman Beyond	Ms. Martel	Voice, episode: "Zeta"
2000	Nash Bridges	Crissy	Episode: "Manhunt"
2001	Providence	Meryl Ridley	Episode: "Saved by the Bell"
2001	Malcolm in the Middle	Julie	Episode: "Book Club"
2002	Clifford the Big Red Dog	Mrs. Violet Bleakman, Grandma Ethel	Voice, episode: "Who Moved My Bone?/Clifford the Pirate King"
2003	Stuart Little	Home of the Year Judge #1, Mrs. Remington	Voice, episode: "Adventures in Housekeeping"
2004	The Batman	June Brown	Voice, episode: "Q&A"
2004–2005	Totally Spies!	Myrna Beesbottom	Voice, 4 episodes
2005	Fat Actress	Nosy Lady	Episode: "Charlie's Angels"
2005	American Dragon: Jake Long	The Tooth Fairy	Voice, 3 episodes
2005–2006	The Adventures of Jimmy Neutron, Boy Genius	Grandma Taters	Voice, 2 episodes
2005–2007	Higglytown Heroes	Fran	Main voice role
2005, 2014	CSI: Crime Scene Investigation	Madge	2 episodes
2006	American Dragon: Jake Long	Bertha	Voice, episode: "The Hunted"
2006	Nanaka 6/17	Yuriko	1 episode
2007	Campus Ladies	—N/a	Episode: "We Are Family"
2008	Miss Guided	Mrs. Dawn Pool	Episode: "Pool Party"
2008	Hannah Montana	Cindy Merriwether	Episode: "Hannah in the Streets with Diamonds"
2008	Curious George	The Doorwoman	Voice, episode: "Everything Old is New Again"
2008–2012	The Life & Times of Tim	Helen	Voice, 17 episodes
2009	Days of Our Lives	Airline Passenger	2 episodes
2009	Titan Maximum	Gammy	Voice, episode: "Dirty Lansbury"
2010–2012	Fish Hooks	Mrs. Goldfishberg	Voice, 8 episodes
2011	Pair of Kings	June	Episode: "Brady Battles Boo-Mer"
2011	Elvira's Movie Macabre	Bernadette, Mistress of the Wind	Episode: "Untamed Woman"
2011	Portlandia	Mayor's Secretary	Episode: "Mayor Is Missing"
2011	Rules of Engagement	Silvia	Episode: "The Last of the Red Hat Lovers"
2012	Desperate Housewives	Connie Thomas	Episode: "Who Can Say What's True?"
2012	Doc McStuffins	Moo Moo	Voice, episode: "Blame It on the Rain"
2013	Two and a Half Men	Helen	Episode: "The Unblessed Biscuit"
2014	Sketchy	Stella	Episode: "Candy Crush Addiction"
2014	TripTank	Dawn	Voice, episode: "Roy & Ben's Day Off"
2014	Wander Over Yonder	Trudi Traveler	Voice, episode: "The Tourist"
2014	Ben 10: Omniverse	Vera Tennyson	Voice, episode: "Clyde Five"
2014	Regular Show	Muscle Man's Mom	Voice, episode: "Terror Tales of the Park IV"
2014	NCIS	Mrs. Ruth Potts	Episode: "Grounded"
2014	The Tom and Jerry Show	Mrs. Clause	Episode: "Santa's Little Helpers"
2015	Mike & Molly	Paula Martin	Episode: "Cocktails and Calamine"
2015	Bad Shorts	Grace	Episode: "Ghost Lookers: The Haunting of Bueller House"
2016	Transformers: Robots in Disguise	Realtor	Voice, episode: "Strongarm's Big Score"
2020	Family Guy	Grace	Voice, episode: "Holly Bibble"

=== Television films ===
Year	Title	Role	Notes
1977	Once Upon a Brothers Grimm	Esmerelda	Segment: "Hansel and Gretel"
1983	Bill: On His Own	Angela	
1988	Crash Course	Beth Crawford	
1988	Dance 'til Dawn	Ruth Strull	
1990	Menu for Murder	Patsy Webber	
1992	Ring of the Musketeers	Temp Agency Agent	Uncredited role
1996	Inhumanoid	Dra. Marianne Snow	
1998	Murder She Purred: A Mrs. Murphy Mystery	—N/a	
2005	Everything You Want	Mary Louise Morrison	
2019	Lucky	Miss Doris	Voice

=== Additional credits ===
- Double Suicide (1982 - short film)
- The Paragon of Comedy (1983 – television special)
- Christmas Everyday (1986 – television special)
- Tiny Toons Spring Break (1994 – television special)
- Life with Louie: A Christmas Surprise for Mrs. Stillman ... Ora Anderson (1994 – television short)
- Nightmare Ned ... Storytelling Dragon (1997 – video game)
- Escape from Monkey Island ... Miss Rivers (2000 – video game)
- Clifford the Big Red Dog: Thinking Adventures ... Violet Bleakman, Traffic People (2000 - video game)
- Stinky Pierre (2003 – television short)
- Clifford the Big Red Dog: Phonics ... Violet Bleakman (2003 - video game)
- Tak 3: The Great Juju Challenge ... Stone Crusher (2005 – video game)
- Toot & Puddle: I'll Be Home for Christmas (2006 – direct-to video animated film)
- What's Wrong with Ruth ... Mother (2007 television short animation)
- The Outlaw Emmett Deemus ... Mary (2008 – short film)
- Stage Two ... Maggie's Mom (2008 – short film)
- The Not Goods Anthology: This Is Absolutely Not Good ... Herself (2010 – video short)
- dated. ... Edie (2011 – video short)
- Heal Thyself ... Doris Green (2012 – Short film)
- Curious George Swings Into Spring ... Lydia / Mom / Lady (2013 – video animation)
- The Gift ... Old Lady (2014 – short film)
- Eyes Upon Waking ... Nurse Jane (2014 – short film)
- How to Become an Outlaw (2014)

=== Theatre ===
- The Pee-wee Herman Show ... Hermit Hattie / Clockey (1981)
