= Maeve Press =

American actress, writer, and comedian

- Born: New York, U.S.
- Occupations: Actress, comedian, writer
- Years active: 2015–present
- Relatives: Darren Press (father)

Maeve Press is an American actress, writer, and comedian. She is best known for her role as Genevieve in the Freeform comedy series Everything's Gonna Be Okay.

== Early life ==
Press was born and raised in New York. Her mother, C. Fraser Press, and her father, Darren Press, both work as filmmakers. She has an older sister Schuyler Iona Press, and a younger sister Amaya Press, both of whom have also worked in entertainment.

== Career ==
Press began professional stand-up at the age of 12. She has since performed at numerous comedy festivals. She was cast in a 2015 New York City production of Before Your Very Eyes. In 2019, she was cast as Genevieve in the Freeform show Everything's Gonna Be Okay. In 2024, she made her Edinburgh Festival Fringe debut with her solo show Failure Confetti, which she wrote and starred in. In April 2025, it was announced that Press had been cast in the Disney+ pilot Holes. However, in December 2025, Disney announced that the series would not be moving forward.

=== Film ===
Year	Title	Role	Writer	Notes
2010	Theresa Is a Mother	Tuesday McDermott	No	
2015	The In Betweens	Nikki	No	Short Film
2021	Too Many Buddhas	Nora	Yes	Short film
2023	Stuck	Aria	No	Short film

=== Theater ===
Year	Title	Role	Theater	Notes
2011	A Christmas Carol	Tiny Tim	13th St Rep Theater, NYC	
2014	Before Your Very Eyes	Maeve	The Public Theater	Gob Squad Production
2016	The Phillie Trilogy	Barbie	Fresh Fruit Festival, NYC	
2017	Rotting Wood the Dripping Word	Ghost Child	MoMa PS. 1	
2018	Dis(is)Respect	Self	Speak up, Rise up festival The Tank	Solo show: Writer/ performer
2020	Shamed	Jessica	Jewish Plays project	Reading
2020	Lily Ineffable	Lily Sutton	Jewish Plays project	Reading
2023	Marv: a one maeve show	Self	Producers club, NYC	Solo show: Writer/ Performer
2024	Failure Confetti	Self	Edinburgh Fringe Festival, Assembly theaters	Solo show: Writer Perfomer
2025	Campus Safety	Student	Berkshire Theater Festival	Reading
2025	The Hope Machine	Maya	Berkshire Theater Festival	Reading
2026	Ruins	Laily	Theatre Write Now	Reading

=== Television ===
Year	Title	Role	Network	Notes
2016	Why Can't Girls Code	Self	Girls Who Code	PSA
2017	Evil Lives Here		Investigation Discovery	Episode "My Brother, The Devil"
2020-21	Everything's Gonna Be Okay	Genevieve	Freeform	Main role

=== Voice Over ===
Year	Title	Role	Network	Notes
2023	Big Envelopes	Becky	Audible, TreeFort	Episode " Saving Face"

== Personal life ==
Maeve was diagnosed as neurodivergent while in elementary school.
