= Matthew Gumley =

American actor

- Born: Matthew David Gumley; February 6, 1997 (age 28); West Palm Beach, Florida, U.S.
- Occupation: Actor
- Years active: 2002–present

Matthew David Gumley (born February 6, 1997 in West Palm Beach, Florida) is an American actor.

== Broadway productions ==
- Beauty and the Beast (2004–2005, as Chip)
- Mary Poppins Original Cast (2006–2008, as Michael Banks)
- Elf Original Cast (2010–2011, as Michael)
- Addams Family Original Cast (2010, as Ancestor, u/s Pugsley Addams)

== Filmography ==
=== Television ===
Year	Title	Role	Notes
2002	In Search of...	Young Tom	Episode: "The Alien Menace"
2005	All My Children	Scooter	Episode: "1.9033"
2005	The Daily Show	Gene Kelly	Episode "dated 13 July 2005"
2005	Drake & Josh	Young Josh Nichols	Episode: "Foam Finger"
2006, 2010	Law & Order: Special Victims Unit	Boy, Joe	2 episodes
2007–2008	Wonder Pets!	Mouse King, Pangaroo	Voice, 2 episodes
2008–2012	Dora the Explorer	Benny	Voice, 15 episodes
2011	Modern Family	Jimmy Scrivano	Episode: "Dude Ranch"
2011	Psych	Mason	Episode: "Shawn Saves Darth Vader"
2013	The Americans	Rich	Episode: "The Oath"
2017–2018	Nella the Princess Knight	Clod	Voice, 33 episodes
2020	Yu-Gi-Oh! Sevens	Luke Kallister	Voice, 2 episodes

=== Film ===
Year	Title	Role	Notes
2006	Artie Lange's Beer League	Tommy	
2012	Theresa Is a Mother	Seth Nerwitz	
2025	Shakey Grounds	Darby	

=== Video games ===
Year	Title	Role	Notes
2006	Thrillville	Children	
2007	Thrillville: Off the Rails	Children	
2008	Grand Theft Auto IV	Zachary Tyler	
2021	Yu-Gi-Oh! Rush Duel: Dawn of the Battle Royale	Luke Kallister	
2022	Yu-Gi-Oh! Cross Duel	Luke Kallister	
