= Richard Poe =

American actor (born 1946)

- Born: January 25, 1946 (age 79); Portola, California, U.S.
- Occupation: Actor
- Years active: 1984–present
- Website: richardpoenyc.com

Richard Poe (born January 25, 1946) is an American actor. He has worked in movies, television and on Broadway.

== Biography ==
Poe was born in Portola, California. He graduated from Pittsburg Senior High School in 1964 then from the University of San Francisco in 1967. He served in the United States Army during the Vietnam War era. Along with Leonard Nimoy, DeForest Kelley, James Doohan, Mark Lenard, Jonathan Frakes, Marina Sirtis, Armin Shimerman and John de Lancie he is one of only a few actors to play the same character on three different Star Trek series. He played Gul Evek in Star Trek: The Next Generation (1987), Star Trek: Deep Space Nine (1993) and Star Trek: Voyager (1995). He appeared in A Christmas Carol at Ford's Theatre, 2006, as Ebenezer Scrooge, and appeared on Broadway in fourteen productions, including the original M. Butterfly (Tony Award), Our Country's Good, The Pajama Game (Tony Award), Journey's End (Tony Award) and All The Way (Tony Award). He created roles in the off-Broadway productions of Paul Rudnick's Jeffrey and Christopher Durang's Why Torture Is Wrong... and the People Who Love Them.

Poe narrated the audiobook versions of Cormac McCarthy's novels Blood Meridian, The Crossing and Suttree, Dan Brown's Angels & Demons, and Carl Bernstein's and Bob Woodward's non-fiction bestseller All the President's Men. He won the 2004 Audie Award for his narration of East Of Eden, has been nominated three other times, and has been a frequent recipient of AudioFile Magazine's Earphone Award.

== Partial filmography ==
- Mystery Mansion (1984) .... Adam Drake
- Born on the Fourth of July (1989) .... Frankie – VA Hospital
- Babes

- Episode: "Pilot" (1990) .... Tyrone

- A Promise to Keep (1990, TV Movie)
- Law & Order

- Episode: "Happily Ever After" (1990) .... Forensic Scientist
- Episode: "Working Mom" (1997) .... Mac Bernum

- Teamster Boss: The Jackie Presser Story (1992, TV Movie) .... Bishop
- The Night We Never Met (1993) .... Bartender
- Frasier

- Episode: "Oops" (1993) .... Chopper Dave
- Episode: "Miracle on Third or Fourth Street" (1993) .... Chopper Dave

- Star Trek: The Next Generation

- Episode: "Journey's End" (1994) ... Gul Evek
- Episode: "Preemptive Strike" (1994) .... Gul Evek

- Star Trek: Deep Space Nine

- Episode: "Playing God" (1994) .... Gul Evek
- Episode: "The Maquis: Part 1" (1994) .... Gul Evek
- Episode: "Tribunal" (1994) .... Gul Evek

- Speechless (1994) .... Tom
- Star Trek: Voyager

- Episode: "Caretaker: Part 1' (1995) .... Gul Evek

- The 5 Mrs. Buchanans .... Ed Buchanan

- Episode: "Clyde and Vivian and Ed and Malice" (1994)
- Episode: "Becoming a Buchanan" (1995)
- Episode: "Viv'acious" (1995)

- Pride & Joy

- Episode: "Terror at 30,000 Feet" (1995) .... Herb

- The Real Adventures of Jonny Quest

- Episode: "Ezekiel Rage" (1996) .... Dr. Smallwood (voice)

- The Prosecutors (1996, TV Movie) .... Roy Mariello
- The Peacemaker (1997) .... DOE Haz-mat Tech #2
- Now and Again

- Episode: "There Are No Words" (2000) .... Admiral

- Ed

- Episode: "Home Is Where the Ducks Are" (2000) .... Jim Ludwig
- Episode: "Hidden Agendas" (2004) .... Dalton Locke

- Transamerica (2005) .... John
- The Warrior Class (2005) .... Magistrate
- Burn After Reading (2008) .... Stretching Gym Patron
- Theresa Is a Mother (2012) .... Roy McDermott
- Delivery Man (2013) .... Loan Officer #3
- Theresa Is a Mother (release 2015) .... Roy McDermett
- Hot Air (2018) .... (voice)
