= Homer Gere =

American actor (born 2000)

- Born: Homer James Jigme Gere; February 6, 2000 (age 26); New York City, US
- Education: Brown University
- Occupation: Actor
- Years active: 2025–present
- Parents: Richard Gere (father); Carey Lowell (mother)
- Relatives: Hannah Dunne (half-sister)

Homer James Jigme Gere (born February 6, 2000) is an American television and film actor.

== Early and personal life ==
Born in New York City, he is the son of actors Richard Gere and Carey Lowell. He was named after his paternal grandfather Homer Gere, and was given the middle name James after his maternal grandfather, James Lowell. His third name, Jigme, means "fearless" in Tibetan. His half-siblings include actress Hannah Dunne. He graduated from Brown University in 2024.

== Career ==
Gere appeared as Dylan Reid in the third season of HBO drama series Euphoria in 2026, alongside Sydney Sweeney.

In 2025, he was also cast in the Ryan Murphy adaptation of Bret Easton Ellis novel The Shards, appearing alongside Kaia Gerber. The portrayal of the character Robert Mallory marked his first leading role, with a release date of the series set for August 2026. In June 2026, it was announced that Gere was cast in the Oliver Stone film White Lies.

== Filmography ==
=== Film ===
Year	Title	Role	Notes	Ref.
TBA	White Lies	TBA	Feature film debut	

=== Television ===
Year	Title	Role	Notes	Ref.
2026	Euphoria	Dylan Reid	Recurring role; 4 episodes	
2026	The Shards	Robert Mallory	Main role; 9 episodes	
