= Makepeace =

Makepeace is an English surname derived from the medieval English Mak(en), to make, plus Pais, peace. It originally designated a mediator, one who is skilled at negotiation of hostilities. It may refer to:

== People ==
- Brian Makepeace (born 1931), English footballer
- Chris Makepeace (born 1964), Canadian film and television actor
- Harry Makepeace (1881–1952), English cricketer and footballer
- John Makepeace (born 1939), British furniture designer and maker
- Jonathan Makepeace (1774–1850), American businessman and politician
- Mary Lou Makepeace, American activist and politician, first female mayor of Colorado Springs (1997–2003)
- Ralph Makepeace (1909–1995), English footballer
- Reginald Makepeace (1890–1918), British First World War flying ace
- Troy Makepeace (born 1979), Australian rules footballer
- William Makepeace Thackeray (1811–1863), British novelist, author and illustrator

== Fictional characters ==
- Detective Sergeant Lady Harriet "Harry" Makepeace, in Dempsey and Makepeace, a British television crime drama
- Quentin Makepeace, a villain in the Bartimaeus Sequence series of children's novels
- Colonel Makepeace, in Stargate SG-1
- Tom Makepeace, in House of Cards
- Winter Makepeace and Asa Makepeace, in the Maiden Lane series of romance novels by Elizabeth Hoyt
- Abel Makepeace, in MacGyver
- Corrine Calloway, née Makepeace, protagonist in Brightness Falls, The Good Life (novel), and Bright, Precious Days, a trilogy of novels by Jay McInerney

== See also ==
- C. R. Makepeace & Company, a defunct architectural firm in Rhode Island, United States
- D. E. Makepeace Company, a historical building in Attleboro, Massachusetts, United States
- George Makepeace House, a historical building in Madison, Indiana, United States
