= The Zoo Story =

One-act play by American playwright Edward Albee

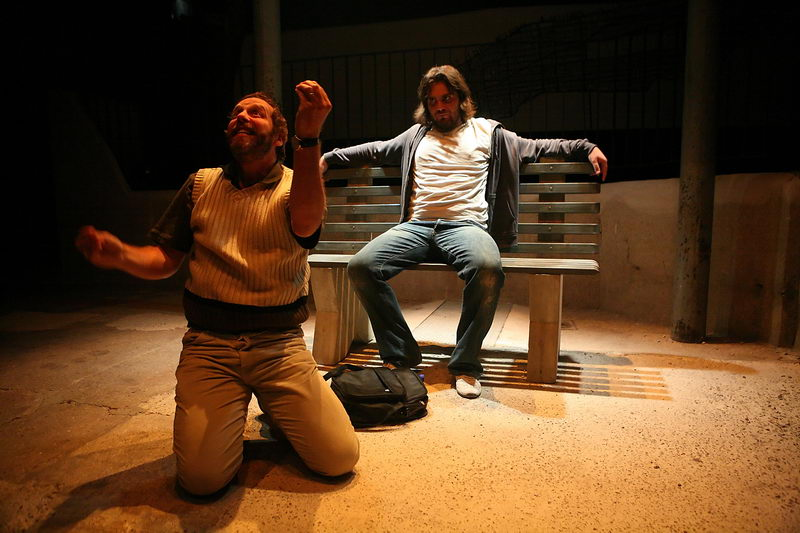
- The Zoo Story; photograph from a Luxembourgish production
- Written by: Edward Albee
- Characters: Peter; Jerry

Premiere
- Date: September 28, 1959
- Place: Schiller Theater, West Berlin

The Zoo Story is a one-act play by American playwright Edward Albee. His first play, it was written in 1958 and completed in just three weeks.

== Productions ==
Rejected by New York producers, the play premiered in West Berlin at the Schiller Theater Werkstatt on September 28, 1959, in a double bill with the German premiere of Samuel Beckett's Krapp's Last Tape.

The play premiered in the United States Off-Broadway in a production by Theatre 1960 at the Provincetown Playhouse on January 14, 1960, and closed on May 21, 1961. The play was paired with Krapp's Last Tape. Directed by Milton Katselas, the cast was William Daniels (Peter) and George Maharis (Jerry). Maharis left the production on March 6, 1960, to film Exodus. Peter Mark Richman (then known as Mark Richman) took over the role of Jerry on March 8, 1960. Daniels and Richman performed to rave reviews for more than nine months. Richman left the production in January 1961. The play won the 1960 Obie Award for Distinguished Play and Distinguished Performance, William Daniels. (Michael Karlan replaced Mark Richman for six weeks when Richman left the show to shoot a film.) On May 23, 2026, the Canadian theatre company Survival of the Useless staged a four show performance at What Lab in Vancouver, B.C.

== Plot summary ==
This one-act play concerns two characters, Peter and Jerry, who meet on a park bench in New York City's Central Park. Peter is a wealthy publishing executive with a wife, two daughters, two cats, and two parakeets. Jerry is an isolated and disheartened man, desperate to have a meaningful conversation with another human being. He intrudes on Peter's peaceful state by interrogating him and forcing him to listen to stories about his life and the reason behind his visit to the zoo. The action is linear, unfolding in front of the audience in “real time”. The elements of ironic humor and unrelenting dramatic suspense are brought to a climax when Jerry brings his victim down to his own savage level.

Eventually, Peter has had enough of his strange companion and tries to leave. Jerry begins pushing Peter off the bench and challenges him to fight for his territory. Unexpectedly, Jerry pulls a knife on Peter, and then drops it as initiative for Peter to grab. When Peter holds the knife defensively, Jerry charges him and impales himself on the knife. Bleeding on the park bench, Jerry finishes his zoo story by bringing it into the immediate present: "Could I have planned all this. No... no, I couldn't have. But I think I did." Horrified, Peter runs away from Jerry, whose dying words, "Oh...my...God", are a combination of scornful mimicry and supplication.

== Revised version ==
Albee wrote a prequel to The Zoo Story, titled Homelife. Homelife is written as the first act, with The Zoo Story as the second act, in a new play called Edward Albee's At Home at the Zoo (initially titled Peter & Jerry). Homelife was first read publicly at the Last Frontier Theatre Conference.

Christopher Wallenberg wrote of The Zoo Story: "Over the years, he'd [Albee] always had a nagging feeling that something was missing from the piece’s unsettling encounter between two very different men on a Central Park bench ..." Albee said: "The Zoo Story is a good play. It's a play that I'm very happy I wrote. But it's a play with one and a half characters. Jerry is a fully developed, three-dimensional character. But Peter is a backboard. He’s not fully developed. Peter had to be more fleshed out."

=== Production history ===
The two-act play Peter and Jerry had its world premiere at the Hartford Stage in 2004, with Pam MacKinnon directing and Frank Wood as Peter, Johanna Day as Ann, and Fred Weller as Jerry.

The play was produced Off-Broadway at the Second Stage Theatre in 2007, and starred Bill Pullman, Dallas Roberts and Johanna Day. It was titled Peter and Jerry.

The play, titled Edward Albee's At Home at the Zoo played at American Conservatory Theater in San Francisco in June 2009, with Anthony Fusco as Peter, René Augesen as his wife Ann, and Manoel Felciano as Jerry.

At Home at the Zoo had its Pittsburgh-area premiere as the inaugural show of the Ghostlight Theatre Troupe in Gibsonia, Pennsylvania in July 2010. It starred Rich Kenzie as Peter, Mary Romeo as Ann and Ned Johnstone as Jerry and was directed by Gabe Herlinger.

At Home at the Zoo opened on February 23, 2018, at New York's Signature Theatre, starring Katie Finneran, Robert Sean Leonard and Paul Sparks.

== In popular culture ==
The Zoo Story is referenced in the 1993 film Grumpy Old Men.

The Zoo Story is a central element in the 2008 novel Qiṣṣat hadīqat al-ḥayawān (English: The Zoo Story), by Moroccan playwright and novelist Yūsuf Fāḍil, set in the milieu of actors and playwrights in 1970s Morocco and Moroccans in Paris. The two main characters of the novel, Al-Sīmū and Rašīd, want to perform a Moroccan version of the play, but their copy of Albee's work is missing essential pages.

The Zoo Story is referenced in Jay McInerney's 1988 novel Story of My Life, Michel Tremblay’s 1992 memoir Douze Coups de Théâtre (English: Twelve Opening Acts), and Bill Hader's TV series Barry (2018).

The Zoo Story is referenced in the 2023 film Woman of the Hour. While on a date with a serial killer, the main character of the film, played by Anna Kendrick, refers to The Zoo Story and quotes the line “Sometimes it’s necessary to go a long distance out of the way in order to come back a short distance correctly”.
