= Bright, Precious Days =

Book by Jay McInerney

- First edition
- Author: Jay McInerney
- Language: English
- Genre: Novel
- Publisher: Knopf
- Publication date: 2016
- Publication place: United States

Bright, Precious Days is a 2016 novel by American author Jay McInerney. It is his third novel about Corrine and Russell Calloway, a couple who live on the Upper East Side of Manhattan. Like the previous two novels in the series, Bright, Precious Days is set against the backdrop of a historical event, in this case the Great Recession. The novel received mostly negative reviews.

== Development and inspiration ==
The novel is the third in a tetralogy about a couple, Corrine and Russell Calloway, and follows the 2006 novel The Good Life. McInerney chose to focus three novels on the Calloways, as he became "fond of them". Drawing the term from Philip Roth's novel The Counterlife, McInerney has said that Russell’s life exists as a “counterlife” to his own, allowing him "...to continue exploring the life of this city" and to avoid writing autobiographical sequels to his first (and best-known) work, Bright Lights, Big City, which focused on the club culture and nightlife of Downtown Manhattan in the 1980s. This change in focus also allowed McInerney to produce a more "panoramic" novel about New York, one that "encompassed a much broader picture of contemporary life".

The idea that an affair between Corrine and Luke McGavock, a banker, "wasn’t really over" after concluding ambiguously in The Good Life inspired McInerney to write Bright, Precious Days.

== Reception ==
Critics were mostly negative in their appraisal of the work. Alex Preston, writing for The Guardian said that the "...novel that lurches from party to party like a gin-drunk socialite, filling the journeys between fundraisers with narrative revelations that fizzle out before they are felt".
