= Show jumping horse killings =

Cases of insurance fraud in the United States

The show jumping horse killings scandal refers to an unverified number of insurance fraud cases in the United States between the mid-1970s and the mid-1990s in which expensive horses, many of them show jumpers, were insured against death, accident, or disease, and then killed to collect the insurance money. Many of the killings involved racketeering, and numerous perpetrators were convicted of crimes.

== Overview ==
It is not known how many horses were killed in this manner between the mid-1970s and the mid-1990s, when a Federal Bureau of Investigation (FBI) investigation brought the horse killings to light, but the number is thought to be well over 50, and may have been as high as 100. In addition, in 1977, the heiress Helen Brach disappeared and was presumed by law enforcement agents to have been murdered by the perpetrators of these crimes, because she threatened to report their criminal activity to authorities; continuing investigations into Brach's death began to uncover the insurance fraud in the 1990s.

The scandal has been called "one of the biggest, most gruesome stories in sports" as well as "the biggest scandal in the history of equestrian sports."

Thirty-six people were indicted and tried for insurance fraud, mail and wire fraud, obstruction of justice, extortion, racketeering, and animal cruelty in connection with the unlawful horse killings; all but one were convicted. Of the 23 people indicted in Chicago in July 1994, 20 pleaded guilty.

The disappearance and murder of Helen Brach was never fully solved, although one man, Richard Bailey, was imprisoned for soliciting her murder.

Over the 20-year period during which the horse killings took place, several different motivations led horse owners and trainers, often affluent and well-respected people, to become involved in what ultimately became a widespread conspiracy.

In some cases, the owner of a promising, or even prize-winning, horse was temporarily strapped for cash and decided to insure and then kill the animal; this was the situation in the 1982 fraudulent killing of the show jumper Henry the Hawk.

Sometimes people bought over-valued horses. Rather than take a loss on a poor investment, these owners chose to finance their next horse purchase by defrauding the insurance company that had insured the unwanted horse.

Another aspect to the scandal went beyond insurance fraud and involved racketeering. This scheme, a form of confidence game, consisted of bilking wealthy widows of their money by encouraging them to invest in horses. The animals were usually over-valued or under-performing, and the conspirators killed the animals in order to prevent the owners from uncovering how much they had overspent. In some cases, before the women invested, these non-performing animals were first "bid up" in value by the co-conspirators, in an attempt to make them seem more desirable to the purchasers. In other cases, a shill buyer would offer to co-purchase the horse from a conspiring owner or trainer, with each buyer putting up half the stated purchase price. The check from the shill buyer would be destroyed and the two con artists would deposit and split the money paid by the wealthy woman buyer. If she began to suspect that the horse she had purchased was relatively valueless, it would be killed for the insurance money, which would soothe her financially, and if the conspirators still had her confidence, she would then be encouraged to invest in another co-owned horse, repeating the cycle. The men who worked this form of confidence game often acted as gigolos to the widows they bilked. It was one of these schemes which the wealthy widow Helen Brach uncovered that — when she announced her intention to report the fraud that had been perpetrated on her — led to her disappearance and murder.

== Famous victims ==
=== Drucks' Henry the Hawk ===
In Florida in 1981, then-17-year-old Lisa Druck (who later changed her name to Rielle Hunter and became known for having an affair with presidential candidate John Edwards in 2008) owned and rode a show horse named Henry the Hawk. She had been in show jumping competitions and won prizes with Henry across the state. Because she was underage, her finances were controlled by her father, James Druck (born 1934), an attorney and owner of Eagle Nest Farm. Druck's legal practice consisted of defending insurance companies against claims, and he knew that if a horse were electrocuted in a certain manner, it would be very difficult for a veterinary pathologist to find signs of foul play and the death would be chalked up to colic. According to ABC News, the woman was "a prize-winning equestrian when her father was implicated in an ugly plot to electrocute horses for insurance money."

In the early 1990s, following James Druck's death, convicted horse-killer and FBI informant Tommy Burns told authorities and reporters that James Druck had first attempted to sell his daughter's horse for $150,000, but the highest offer he received was only $125,000. He then hired Burns and personally taught him how to electrocute horses, even going so far as to buy Burns's first set of electrocution tools. The first horse that Druck hired Burns to kill was Henry the Hawk, whose life insurance policy was worth $150,000. James Druck thus started Tommy Burns on a 10-year-long career as a "horse murderer".

James Druck collected on a $150,000 insurance policy for arranging the killing of his daughter's horse in 1982, but he was under investigation by the FBI when he died of cancer in Tampa, Florida in 1990.

Lisa Druck served as the inspiration for the character Allison Poole in the 1988 novel Story of My Life by Jay McInerney, who Druck had briefly dated.

=== Helen Brach ===
The wealthy socialite Helen Brach was a human victim. Brach was a millionaire candy company heiress and animal lover who vanished in 1977 at the age of 65. While her body was never found, she was declared dead in 1984. Investigators suspected that she was murdered because she threatened to reveal what she knew about the over-valuing of horses, which would have led authorities to the string of horse killings perpetrated by Richard Bailey, a man who was later indicted for a role in her murder.

The events surrounding Brach's murder were summarized by the United States Court of Appeals for the Seventh Circuit in adjudicating an appeal made by Richard Bailey:

Helen Vorhees Brach, millionaire heiress to the Brach's Confections fortune, was one of Bailey's victims. She met Bailey in 1973 and they entered into a relationship. In 1975, Bailey's brother, Paul, sold her three horses for $98,000; unknown to Brach, Bailey also participated in the sale, and the horses were worth less than $20,000. Additionally, Brach bought a group of expensive brood mares. On New Year's Eve 1977, Brach and Bailey 'danced the night away' at New York's Waldorf-Astoria, but their relationship soon began to deteriorate. Early in 1977, Bailey and a co-conspirator arranged an extensive showing for Brach, hoping to persuade her to invest $150,000 in more horses. Brach left in less than an hour. Further, an appraiser Brach hired recommended she invest nothing in training one of her original three purchases, contrary to the $50,000 estimate of the trainer recommended by Bailey. Around this time Brach also visited her breeding stock. After viewing the mares, she openly displayed rage at the stables, screaming about being cheated and informing anyone within earshot that she was going to the district attorney's office. Subsequently, she told a close friend that she was disturbed about her purchase of horses from a younger man whom she had been seeing (Bailey), and after hearing that her friend knew state prosecutors, she agreed to visit the State's Attorney's office after she returned from her upcoming visit to the Mayo Clinic. Brach departed from the Mayo Clinic on February 17, 1977. She was never seen again, and her body has never been found. Bailey was interviewed in connection with her disappearance but no charges were filed at the time.

In 1984, seven years after she disappeared, Helen Brach was declared legally dead. In 1997, the connections between her death and the conspiracy involving socially prominent horse owners and their hired horse killers became the subject of a true crime book, Hot Blood: The Money, the Brach Heiress, the Horse Murders, written by Ken Englade.

== Horse killers ==
=== Tommy Burns ===
Tommy "The Sandman" Burns (a.k.a. Timmy Robert Ray) earned his nickname because he "put horses to sleep" for the conspirators. He traveled the show circuit, visiting stables with his athletic bag full of electrocution equipment and, for fees ranging from $5,000 to $40,000—generally for 10 percent of the insurance price on the horse—he would kill horses for their owners, who would then pay him off from the money obtained by defrauding the insurers. Burns justified his destruction of the animals on the grounds that electrocution—the technique that he had learned in 1982 from James Druck—was quick and painless.

Burns was arrested in 1991, and confessed to all his crimes in a plea deal. In 1992, the investigative reporters William Nack and Lester Munson, writing for Sports Illustrated, interviewed Burns, who told them a great deal about how the conspiracy operated:

Burns's preferred method of killing horses was electrocution. It had been so ever since the day in 1982 when, he says, the late James Druck, an Ocala, Fla., attorney who represented insurance companies, paid him to kill the brilliant show jumper Henry the Hawk, on whose life Druck had taken out a $150,000 life-insurance policy. In fact, says Burns, Druck personally taught him how to rig the wires to electrocute Henry the Hawk: how to slice an extension cord down the middle into two strands of wire; how to attach a pair of alligator clips to the bare end of each wire; and how to attach the clips to the horse—one to its ear, the other to its rectum. All he had to do then, says Burns, was plug the cord into a standard wall socket. And step back.

=== Harlow Arlie ===
In 1991, Burns was hired to kill a showjumper named Streetwise. This horse was owned by Donna Brown, the ex-wife of former U.S. Olympic rider Buddy Brown, who had once been a trainer at Paul Valliere's farm in Rhode Island. Because the animal had already suffered from colic and thus could not be insured against that disease, electrocution was ruled out as a method of murder. Donna Brown insisted that Burns break the animal's leg and make it look like an accident so that the horse would have to be put down by a vet. Burns decided to sub-contract the deed to a man named Harlow Arlie, who was willing to cripple the horse with a crowbar.

By this time, the FBI had Burns under surveillance, and although the agents were too far away, on 2 February 1991, to prevent the fatal injury to Streetwise, they were able to capture Burns and Arlie after a short chase. The two men confessed to the crime, and Burns, in retaliation for being left without legal aid by his powerful former employers, turned FBI informant and revealed the names of dozens of people who had hired him. As a result of his confession, 36 people were arrested for animal cruelty and insurance fraud, of whom 35 were convicted.

After testifying before the federal grand jury in Chicago investigating insurance fraud in the horse show industry, Harlow Arlie served eight months in jail for breaking Streetwise's leg.

Burns, who revealed the names of many other conspirators, was sentenced to a year in jail for his crimes, including breaking Streetwise's leg; he served six months. He still resides in Florida, where he has legally changed his name to Tim Ray; he currently sells auto parts for a living.

=== Richard Bailey ===
Not only electrocution and leg-breaking were employed as methods to kill insured horses. When arson looked profitable, an entire stable could be burned to the ground, to collect on the building insurance as well as the horse insurance. Richard Bailey, who feuded with his brother, and Frank Jayne and his family, were said to have left "a trail of violence" in the horse-club world of the upper Midwest states of Illinois and Wisconsin over the course of decades.

Richard Bailey pleaded guilty to racketeering, mail and wire fraud, and money laundering charges in 1995 and was sentenced to life in prison for his role in the murder of Helen Brach.

== Conspirators ==
=== Paul Valiere ===
Horse trainers also hired Burns in the conspiracy, including Paul Valliere, the owner of Acres Wild Farm in North Smithfield, Rhode Island. In 1994, Valliere admitted that he hired Burns to electrocute his show horse, Roseau Platiere, so that he could collect $75,000 in insurance money. Once he was apprehended, Valiere turned state's evidence. He wore a wire for a year, gathering information for the federal authorities who were investigating the conspiracy.

Due to his cooperation with law enforcement, Paul Valiere was sentenced in 1996 to four years of probation and ordered to pay a $5,000 fine; he also was indefinitely suspended from participating in horse shows sanctioned by the American Horse Show Association (AHSA). In 2006, Valliere attempted to gain reinstatement to the United States Equestrian Federation (formerly AHSA) causing outrage among those who recalled his crimes, and sparking an online campaign to have him permanently barred from participation in equestrian events.

=== Barney Ward ===
One of Valliere's close friends, the Rhode Island-born trainer Barney Ward (father of Olympic show jumper McLain Ward), who owned Castle Hill farm in Brewster, New York, also arranged horse-killings for wealthy owners. The teenaged Tommy Burns had been working as a groom in 1978 when Ward hired him to work on his farm; Ward eventually arranged for Burns to commit 15 different horse killings.

Ward was charged in 1994 with arranging the killings of four horses. Although he claimed to be innocent of the charges, he pleaded guilty in 1996 to conspiring to kill four horses for their insurance payouts between 1987 and 1990: Charisma, Condino, Rub the Lamp, and Roseau Platiere. In court papers he "admitted that he told the horse killer to keep quiet about the people who hired the killer to slaughter the horses, and, if he kept quiet about [Ward's] friends and business associates, [Ward] would pay him money. [and] that [Ward] later spoke with the horse killer and [...] said that he would kill the horse killer if he did anything to hurt [Ward]."

Ward was sentenced to 33 months in prison, followed by three years of probation. He was also ordered to repay $200,000 in fraudulent insurance claims. Upon his release, Ward sued the AHSA, which had barred him from attending its sanctioned shows. He claimed that it was his right, as a private citizen and no longer a member of the AHSA, to watch his son compete in equestrian events. In 2000, the Supreme Court of New York found that argument meritless, ruling that Ward's membership in AHSA at the time of his criminal conduct, plus his promise to be bound by the organization's rules, authorized the AHSA to discipline him, regardless of his current membership status.

=== Donna Brown ===
Donna Brown, the ex-wife of Paul Valliere's former associate Buddy Brown, was convicted of hiring Tommy Burns and Harlow Arlie to break Streetwise's leg.

=== Others ===
- George Lindemann Junior (son of George Lindemann)
- Marion Hulick

== Aftermath ==
In 1993 Jane F. Clark, president of the 60,000-member United States Equestrian Federation (USEF), then known as the American Horse Shows Association (AHSA), which sanctioned 2,500 equestrian events, told The New York Times that her organization was giving federal authorities its complete cooperation and noted that she was "eager to see the investigation completed and any guilty parties brought to justice." By 1995, the AHSA (now USEF) had expelled a number of members who had been indicted for various crimes connected with the horse murders, including Marion Hulick, Barney Ward, and Paul Valliere.

== Literary parallel ==
In 1988 — long before the arrest of Tommy Burns and the subsequent unraveling of the horse murders conspiracy of silence — "Brat Pack" novelist Jay McInerney based a roman à clef novel, titled Story of My Life, on the young adulthood of his former girlfriend Lisa Druck, James Druck's daughter. McInerney's novel implies that the cause of protagonist Alison Poole's "party girl" behavior is her father's abuse, including the murder of her prize jumping horse.

McInerney has said that he chose to write about Druck and her friends because he was both "intrigued and appalled" by their behavior, and the lead character, Alison Poole, who was closely modeled after Druck, was described as "an ostensibly jaded, cocaine-addled, sexually voracious 20-year old."

There was open speculation that Story of My Life was a roman à clef novel when it first appeared; to New York Magazine's questions "Is it real? Did it happen?" McInerney replied, "I'm anticipating some of that kind of speculation, but I'm utterly confident of not having any lawsuits on my hands. The book is a fully imagined work of fiction. On the other hand, it's not to say that I didn't make use of … That's why I live in New York. Mine is not an autonomous imagination."

McInerney's references to the horse murder conspiracy went unremarked by sports journalists or the general media at the time of the novel's publication, because the scandal itself had not yet come to light in the national press, but the novel received renewed interest in the wake of the John Edwards extramarital affair. In August 2008, Vintage Books ordered an additional 2,500 copies of the book in the wake of the interest generated by the scandal with John Edwards.
