= Attila Hazai =

Hungarian writer (1967–2012)

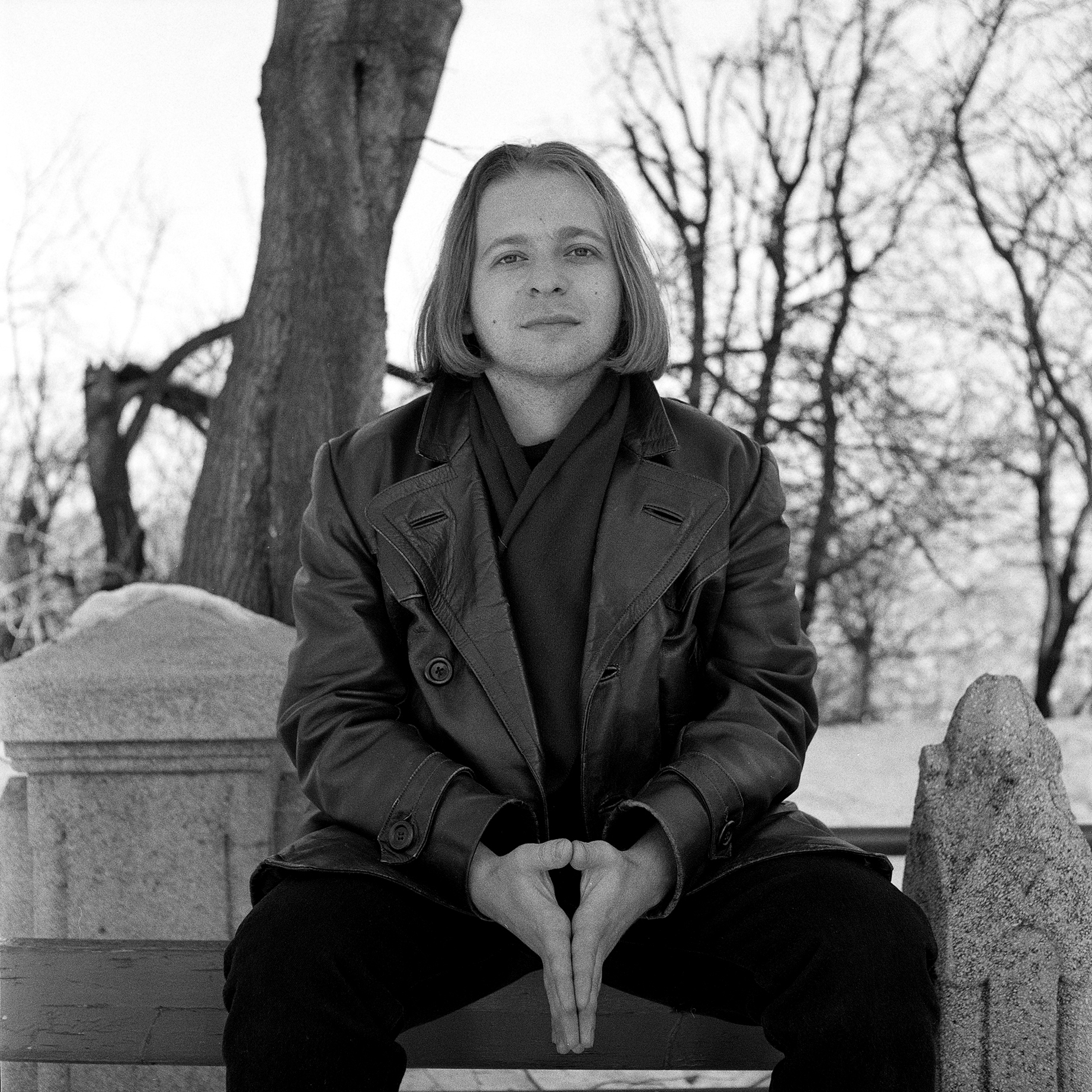
By Gergely Pohárnok

Attila Hazai (April 30, 1967 – April 5, 2012) was a popular Hungarian writer. He is best known for his local version of American Psycho called Budapesti skizo (1997). At the time of his death, none of his works had been translated into English.

== Biography ==
Attila Hazai was born in Budapest. From 1987 to 1995 he studied as an English major at the Eötvös Loránd University. Since 1995 he was an editor at Link Budapest, an Internet magazine for contemporary literature. In 1999 he received a Zsigmond Móricz literature scholarship. Hazai was a member of the Attila József group (Hungarian: József Attila Kör) and a member of the Writers' Union Szépírók Társasága, 2000 to 2004 as its vice president.

He played in a band "Pepsi Érzés, Hazai Íz". He wrote a screenplay called Rám csaj még nem volt ilyen hatással (1993).

His published works include Feri: Cukor Kékség (1992), Szilvia szüzessége (1995), Szex a nappaliban (2000). He is best known for his local version of American Psycho, Budapesti skizo (1997). Hazai also published under a pseudonym, Feri Soros, the novel A Világ legjobb regénye (2000).

His translations into Hungarian include Raymond Carver's Nem ők a te férjed (They are not your husband) (1997), Walter Kirn's Ujjszopó (Thumbsucker) (2000) and James Frey's Millió apró darabban ( A Million Little Pieces) (2004).

Attila Hazai committed suicide on April 5, 2012. He was 44 years old.

== Attila Hazai Prize ==
The Contemporary Writers’ Foundation in Memory of Attila Hazai was established in 2012 by his mother, Éva Hazai. The foundation awards 1.2 million Hungarian forint ($3,500 in 2025) annually to a starting or middle-generation writer.

- 2025 Bettina Simon
- 2024 Borsik Miklós
- 2023 Szőcs Petra
- 2022 Szabó Marcell
- 2021 Anna Zilahi
- 2020 Kiss Tibor Noé
- 2019 Nemes Z. Márió
- 2018 Orcsik Roland
- 2017 Tóth Kinga
- 2016 Bartók Imre
