= Story of My Life (novel) =

1988 novel by Jay McInerney

- First edition
- Author: Jay McInerney
- Language: English
- Genre: Novel
- Publisher: Atlantic Monthly Press
- Publication date: 1988
- Media type: Print (hardcover and paperback)
- Pages: 188
- ISBN: 0871132389

Story of My Life is a novel by American writer Jay McInerney, published in 1988 by Atlantic Monthly Press.

== Plot and characters ==
The novel is narrated in the first-person from the point of view of Alison Poole, "an ostensibly jaded, cocaine-addled, sexually voracious 20-year-old." Alison is originally from Virginia and lives in Manhattan, where she is involved in several sexual relationships and is aspiring to become an actress. She falls in love with bond trader and Shakespeare expert Dean, but soon they betray each other. The novel implies that the cause of Poole's "party girl" behavior is her father's abuse, including the killing of her prize jumping horse.

== Influences ==
Poole is based on McInerney's former girlfriend Rielle Hunter, then named Lisa Druck. In the novel, Poole describes her childhood and tells how her show jumper horse Dangerous Dan had suddenly "dropped dead." McInerney's novel ends with Poole disclosing that her horse was poisoned by her father:

I loved that horse. When he was poisoned I went into shock. They kept me on tranquilizers for a week. There was an investigation — nothing came of it. The insurance company paid off in full, but I quit riding. A few months later, Dad came into my bedroom one night. I was like, uh-oh, not this again. He buried his face in my shoulder. His cheek was wet and he smelled of booze. I'm sorry about Dangerous Dan, he said. Tell me you forgive me. He muttered something about the business[.]

There was speculation that Story of My Life was a roman à clef when it first appeared; to New York magazine's questions "Is it real? Did it happen?" McInerney replied, "I'm anticipating some of that kind of speculation, but I'm utterly confident of not having any lawsuits on my hands. The book is a fully imagined work of fiction. On the other hand, it's not to say that I didn't make use of [pause]...That's why I live in New York. Mine is not an autonomous imagination."

However, in 1981, Lisa Druck's horse, Henry the Hawk, had in fact been killed (albeit by electrocution rather than poison) by her father, James Druck, in order to collect on a $150,000 insurance policy. James Druck was under investigation by the FBI for fraud when he died in 1990.

Poole also appears in the novels of Bret Easton Ellis, including American Psycho, in which she is sexually assaulted by the protagonist Patrick Bateman, and plays a major role in Glamorama as the girlfriend of protagonist Victor Ward. A reference to Poole and the Kentucky Derby — a chapter in McInerney's novel — is also included in Mary Harron's film adaptation of American Psycho in a conversation between Bateman (played by Christian Bale), Elizabeth (played by screenplay co-writer Guinevere Turner), and Christie (played by Cara Seymour):

ELIZABETH: We met ... at the Kentucky Derby in '85 or '86. You were hanging out with that bimbo Alison Poole. Hot number.

PATRICK: What do you mean she was a hot number?

ELIZABETH: If you had a Platinum card she'd give you a blow job. Listen, this girl worked at a tanning salon. Need I say more?

In 2008, McInerney incorporated Hunter's affair with presidential candidate John Edwards into "Penelope on the Pond", featuring Poole, in his short story collections The Last Bachelor and How It Ended.

== Critical reception ==
Michiko Kakutani wrote,

[T]here are some quick, funny portraits of club denizens in this volume, and some satiric renditions of the stoned dialogue that can accompany the ingestion of chemical substances. In the end, though, none of this makes us care about Mr. McInerney's characters. It simply leaves us depressed at the shallowness of these people's lives, and at the author's failure to find a worthy showcase for his talents.

== Publishing history ==
In August 2008, Vintage Books ordered an additional 2,500 copies of the book in the wake of the interest generated by then-presidential candidate John Edwards acknowledging his affair with Hunter.
