= Bright Lights, Big City (film) =

1988 American film by James Bridges

- Theatrical release poster
- Directed by: James Bridges
- Screenplay by: Jay McInerney
- Based on: Bright Lights, Big City by Jay McInerney
- Produced by: Mark Rosenberg; Sydney Pollack
- Starring: Michael J. Fox; Kiefer Sutherland; Phoebe Cates; Dianne Wiest
- Cinematography: Gordon Willis
- Edited by: John Bloom
- Music by: Donald Fagen; Rob Mounsey
- Production company: Mirage
- Distributed by: United Artists
- Release date: April 1, 1988 (United States)
- Running time: 107 minutes
- Countries: United States; Japan
- Language: English
- Budget: $25 million
- Box office: $16 million

Bright Lights, Big City is a 1988 American drama film directed by James Bridges and adapted from Jay McInerney's 1984 novel of the same name. Michael J. Fox stars as a young writer unraveling in Manhattan's fast-paced nightlife, with co-stars Kiefer Sutherland, Phoebe Cates, Dianne Wiest, and Jason Robards. McInerney wrote the screenplay for the adaptation. The film marked the final directorial effort of Bridges, who died in 1993.

Bright Lights, Big City was released by United Artists on April 1, 1988. The film received mixed reviews from critics and grossed $16 million against a $25 million budget.

== Plot ==
The film follows one week in the life of 24-year-old Jamie Conway. Originally from Pennsylvania, Jamie works as a fact-checker for a major New York City magazine. His addiction to cocaine, frequent late night partying with his glib and wealthy best friend Tad Allagash, also a cocaine addict, have made Jamie frequently late for work and not meeting deadlines. Because of this, he has a very strained relationship with his stern boss, Clara Tillinghast, the Research Editor.

His wife Amanda, a fast-rising model, left him two months before. He is also still reeling from the death of his mother from cancer a year earlier, and actively follows a tabloid story about a pregnant woman in a coma.

Jamie is asked to go on a date with Tad's out-of-town cousin, Vicky, as a favor to Tad so he could, in turn, have a fling with a woman he claims is a Penthouse Pet. Jamie avoids phone calls from his younger brother Michael, who has come to the city to look for him, but, instead goes out with Vicky. The date goes well, which encourages Jamie to not use cocaine for the entire evening. After acknowledging their mutual attraction, Vicky returns to her upstate college dorm, sharing a kiss with Jamie before leaving. This makes him feel genuinely happy for the first time in years.

After getting fired from his job, Jamie goes on a further downward spiral with more substance and alcohol abuse. Jamie's maternal co-worker Megan attempts to help him find a new job, as well as open up during a dinner about his troubled life and the reason Amanda left him. Jamie reveals that he had a hard time adjusting to the big city at first, and balancing his marriage to Amanda, the death of his mother and his new job left him with writer's block (he has been trying to finish a novel for years) and a strained relation with Amanda, who was becoming famous as a model and abandoned him to pursue a more glamorous life.

Michael arrives at his apartment and lets himself in, surprising Jamie when he comes home. Jamie reacts angrily at Michael's claim that he has been ignoring his family since the death of their mother and refuses to talk about his life or feelings. While Michael is in the shower, Tad phones and asks Jamie to come to a party that Tad is currently attending. When Jamie refuses, Tad goads him by revealing that Amanda is at the party as well. Jamie immediately leaves and hails a cab.

At the party, Jamie confronts Amanda. She repulses him by asking, "So, how's it going?" Jamie breaks down laughing uncontrollably at the question and retreats to the bathroom with Tad's help when his nose starts to bleed. He looks in the mirror and admits to himself his problems and wants to come clean. Jamie phones Vicky using a phone in the bathroom, revealing to Vicky that he and Michael assisted their dying mother in killing herself to end her suffering. Vicky is very empathetic and tells him to call her any time he needs to talk. Jamie exits the bathroom, declining Tad's offer to spend more time together, stating loudly across the room, "You know what I just realized? You and Amanda are perfect for each other." He then leaves the party alone.

Jamie wanders the streets until dawn, when he stops by a big bakery's loading zone and trades his sunglasses for a baguette. He then walks down to the pier, sits down and looks at the city across the river, pondering and deciding that today will be a better day to get his life back on track. As the story ends, a news clipping of the newborn "Coma Baby Lives!" is shown.

== Cast ==
- Michael J. Fox as Jamie Conway
- Kiefer Sutherland as Tad Allagash
- Phoebe Cates as Amanda White Conway
- Swoosie Kurtz as Megan Avery
- Frances Sternhagen as Clara Tillinghast
- Tracy Pollan as Vicky Allagash
- John Houseman as Mr. Vogel
- Charlie Schlatter as Michael Conway
- David Warrilow as Rittenhouse
- Dianne Wiest as Mrs. Conway
- Alec Mapa as Yasu Wade
- William Hickey as Ferret Man
- Gina Belafonte as Kathy
- Sam Robards as Rich Vanier
- Jessica Lundy as Theresa
- Kelly Lynch as Elaine
- Annabelle Gurwitch as Barbara
- Maria Pitillo as Pony Tail Girl
- David Hyde Pierce as Bartender at Fashion Show
- Peg Murray as Receptionist
- Jason Robards as Alex Hardy

== Production and development ==
In 1984, Robert Lawrence, a vice president at Columbia Pictures, championed Jay McInerney's novel against resistance from older executives. He felt that the book spoke to his generation and described it as "Graduate, with a little bit of Lost Weekend." The studio agreed to make the film with Jerry Weintraub producing and Joel Schumacher directing. McInerney wrote a draft of the screenplay and, soon afterward, Schumacher started rewriting it. Actor Emilio Estevez was interested in adapting it into a film. He met with McInerney while he was still working on the screenplay. Tom Cruise was offered first refusal on the script while McInerney and Schumacher were attempting to capture the novel's distinctive voice. McInerney, Cruise and Schumacher scouted locations in New York City and checked out the atmosphere of the club scenes described in the novel. At one point, Judd Nelson, Estevez, Zach Galligan, Sean Penn, Kevin Bacon, and Rob Lowe were all considered for the role of Allagash.

In 1985, Weintraub took the property to United Artists when he became chief executive there. The film needed a new producer so Sydney Pollack and Mark Rosenberg took over. They hired writer Julie Hickson to write a script. Cruise and Schumacher grew tired of waiting for a workable script, but before they could be replaced, Weintraub left United Artists. The project became entangled in a complicated settlement with the studio, months being lost before it finally stayed at United Artists. A decision was made to shoot the film in Toronto and cast an unknown in the leading role.

Joyce Chopra was hired to co-write the script, with her husband Tom Cole, and also direct it. She had her agent send a copy of McInerney's novel to Michael J. Fox. The actor won the leading role and, at his request, the part of Tad Allagash went to fellow Canadian Kiefer Sutherland. Fox's casting increased the budget to $15 million and principal photography was moved to New York City. The producers hired a crew, many of whom had worked with Pollack, while Chopra brought along the cinematographer from her first film, Smooth Talk, James Glennon.

Fox had to be back in Los Angeles to start taping his television series Family Ties by mid-July, giving Chopra only ten weeks to finish the film. Studio executives did not like what Chopra was shooting and, a week into filming, the studio's chairman and its president of production flew from L.A. to New York City to check on the film. Neither had read the script and both were unaware of how different it was from the novel. McInerney has said that Cole wrote all the drugs out of the script while Cole said that he did this on instructions from Pollack, who was worried that the film would hurt Fox's wholesome image with audiences. Cole recalls, "There was definitely pressure and concern at that time about how Michael was seen by America." The studio announced that "a more experienced director" was needed as a result of an impending strike by the Directors Guild of America. On the short list of possible replacements were Ulu Grosbard, Bruce Beresford, and James Bridges. Bridges received a call on a Friday that the film was in trouble, read the novel that night, and flew to New York City on Sunday. He agreed to direct if he could start from scratch and hire Gordon Willis as his cinematographer.

In seven days, Bridges wrote a new draft bringing back the darker elements of the novel such as the main character's heavy drinking and drug abuse and replaced six actors, casting instead Jason Robards, John Houseman, Swoosie Kurtz, Frances Sternhagen, and Tracy Pollan, while keeping Sutherland and Dianne Wiest. The new cast members read the novel because there was no script at the time. The strike forced the production to shoot in seven weeks and use McInerney's first draft, which Bridges liked the best. Bridges worked on the script on weekends with McInerney, who was enlisted to help with revisions. The two agreed to share screenwriting credit but the Writers Guild of America decided to give it to McInerney only.

The cocaine that Fox snorts in the film was a prop called milk sugar. The filmmakers shot two different endings—one where Fox's character decides to start his life all over but is vague with what he specifically plans to do and an alternative one, to please the studio, where he has finished writing a novel to be called Bright Lights, Big City with a new girlfriend who is proud of what he has written.

== Reception ==
Bright Lights, Big City was released on April 1, 1988, in 1,196 theaters, and grossed USD $5.1 million during its opening weekend. It was a box office bomb, making $16.1 million domestically, well below its budget of $25 million.

The film received mixed reviews from critics and has a 59% rating on Rotten Tomatoes, based on 22 reviews. Metacritic, which uses a weighted average, assigned the film a score of 51 out of 100, based on 18 critics, indicating "mixed or average" reviews. In his review for Newsweek, David Ansen wrote, "Bright Lights isn't an embarrassment, like Less Than Zero; it's a smooth, professional job. But when it's over you may shrug your shoulders and ask, "Is that all?" Janet Maslin, wrote in her review for The New York Times, "Mr. Bridges may not have breathed fire into this material, but he has preserved most of its better qualities. He has treated it with intelligence, respect and no undue reverence, assembling a coherent film that resists any hint of exploitation". In his review for The Washington Post, Hal Hinson criticized Fox's performance, stating that he "was the wrong actor for the job. Fox, who in The Secret of My Succe$s showed a gift for light comedy, is too stylized a performer for the heavier stuff; he has no natural weight. In addition, Fox shows a reluctance to let the audience see him in an unflattering light". However, Roger Ebert praised the actor's performance: "Fox is very good in the central role (he has a long drunken monologue that is the best thing he has ever done in a movie)". Ebert's colleague Gene Siskel felt "burned" by the plotline involving Jamie's mother overshadowing the more interesting story of his failed marriage, but praised Fox's effectiveness in playing a different type of character than usual. He gave a "thumbs down" for the script and a "thumbs up" for Fox. Time magazine's Richard Schickel felt that the film, "arrives... looking like something that has been kicking around too long in the dead-letter office".

=== Home video ===
A special edition DVD version of Bright Lights, Big City was released on September 2, 2008. In her review for The Washington Post, Jen Chaney wrote, "In the end, that's what is most disappointing about this DVD. What could have become a compelling look at a seminal novel of the 1980s and its rocky path through Hollywood ends up being a rudimentary release with a couple of decent commentary tracks and two forgettable featurettes".

=== Possible remake ===
On July 31, 2010, the story's author stated in an NPR All Things Considered interview that Gossip Girl co-creator Josh Schwartz would remake an updated version of the film.

== Soundtrack ==
Bright Lights, Big City: Original Motion Picture Soundtrack

Soundtrack album by Various artists
- Released: March 8, 1988
- Length: 49:14
- Label: Warner Bros.
- Producer: Joel Sill (Compilation producer)

Singles from Bright Lights, Big City: Original Motion Picture Soundtrack
- 1. "Century's End" Released: 1988

Professional ratings
Review scores
| Source | Rating |
|---|---|
| AllMusic | 4.5/5 stars |

=== Track listing ===
| No. | Title | Writer(s) | Artist | Length |
|---|---|---|---|---|
| 1. | "Good Love" | Prince | Prince | 5:12 |
| 2. | "True Faith" | Gillian Gilbert, Stephen Hague, Peter Hook, Stephen Morris, Bernard Sumner | New Order | 5:54 |
| 3. | "Divine Emotions" | Jeffrey Cohen, Narada Michael Walden | Narada | 4:27 |
| 4. | "Kiss and Tell" | Bryan Ferry | Bryan Ferry | 4:06 |
| 5. | "Pleasure, Little Treasure (Glitter Mix)" | Martin Gore | Depeche Mode | 5:36 |
| 6. | "Century's End" | Donald Fagen, Timothy Meher | Donald Fagen | 5:31 |
| 7. | "Obsessed" | Oliver Leiber | The Noise Club | 5:40 |
| 8. | "Love Attack" | Shannon Dawson, G. 'Love' Jay | Konk | 4:00 |
| 9. | "Ice Cream Days" | Jennifer Caron Hall, Alan Tarney | Jennifer Hall | 4:38 |
| 10. | "Pump Up the Volume" | Martyn Young, Steve Young | MARRS | 4:06 |
| Total length: | | | | 49:14 |
