= McLain Ward =

American equestrian

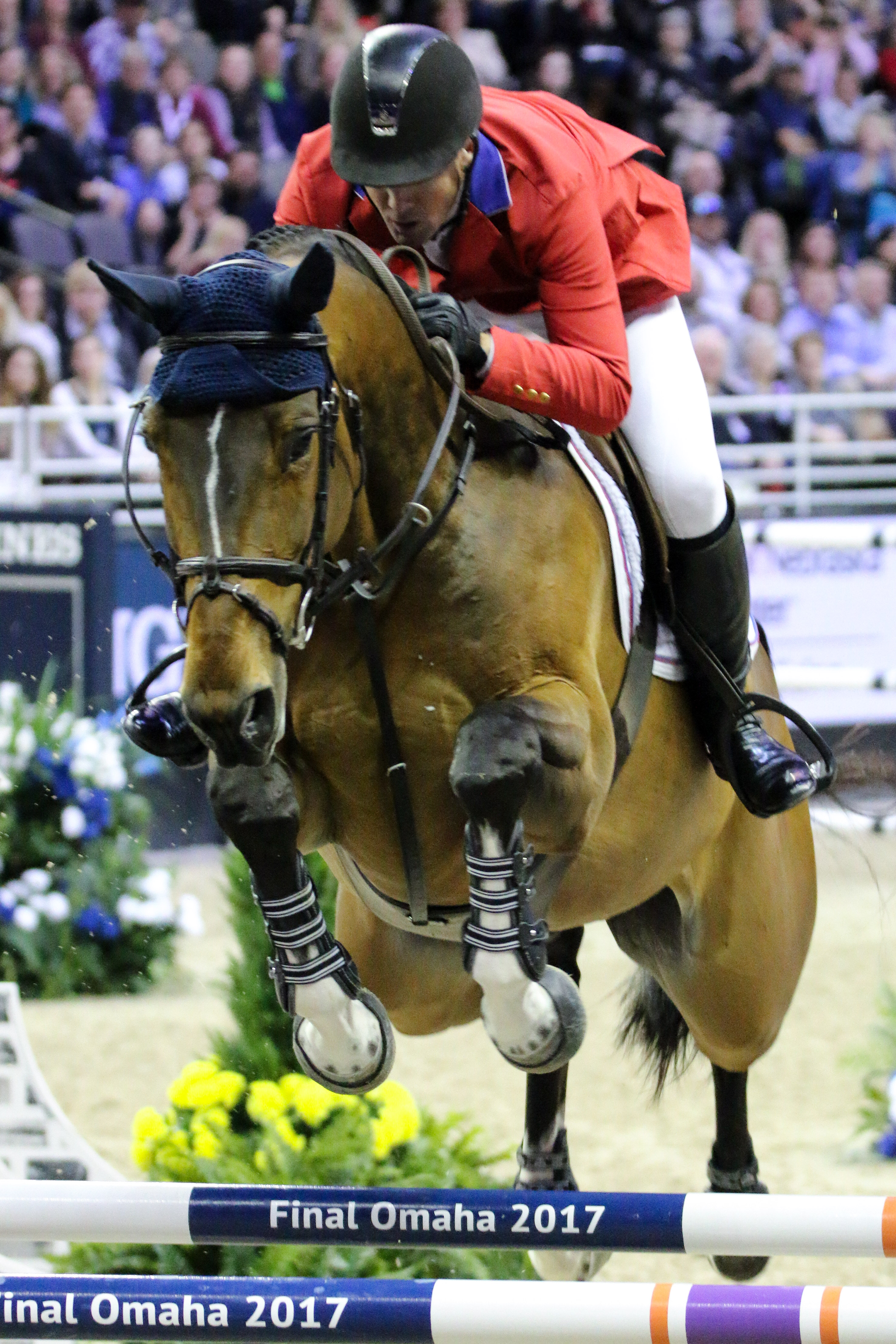
- Ward riding HH Azur in the 2017 FEI World Cup Jumping Finals

Personal information
- Born: October 17, 1975 (age 50) Mount Kisco, New York, U.S.
- Height: 5 ft 9 in (1.76 m)

Sport
- Country: United States
- Sport: Equestrian
- Event: Show jumping
Medal record
Equestrian
Representing the United States
Olympic Games
| Gold medal – first place | 2004 Athens | Team jumping |
| Gold medal – first place | 2008 Beijing | Team jumping |
| Silver medal – second place | 2016 Rio de Janeiro | Team jumping |
| Silver medal – second place | 2020 Tokyo | Team jumping |
| Silver medal – second place | 2024 Paris | Team jumping |
World Championships
| Gold medal – first place | 2018 Tryon | Team jumping |
| Silver medal – second place | 2006 Aachen | Team jumping |
| Bronze medal – third place | 2014 Normandy | Team jumping |
World Cup
| Gold medal – first place | 2017 Omaha | Individual jumping |
Pan American Games
| Gold medal – first place | 2011 Guadalajara | Team jumping |
| Gold medal – first place | 2015 Toronto | Individual jumping |
| Gold medal – first place | 2023 Santiago | Team jumping |
| Bronze medal – third place | 2015 Toronto | Team jumping |
| Bronze medal – third place | 2023 Santiago | Individual jumping |

McLain Ward (born October 17, 1975) is an American show jumping competitor and five-time Olympic medalist.

At the 2004 Olympic Games in Athens, Ward won the team jumping gold medal for the United States, together with Peter Wylde, Beezie Madden, and Chris Kappler. He again won team jumping gold at the 2008 Olympic Games, riding Sapphire alongside teammates Laura Kraut, Beezie Madden and Will Simpson. At the 2016 Summer Olympics, Ward won team jumping silver for the United States.

== Early life ==
Ward was born in Mount Kisco, New York to Barney Ward and Kristine Lindsey. His hometown is Brewster, New York. He graduated from Greenwich Country Day School in 1993. His parents were professionals in the horse industry and encouraged him to ride. His father was his main business partner for much of his life. In 1990, at age 14, he became the youngest rider to win the United States Equestrian Federation's Show Jumping Derby. Later that year, he became the youngest rider to win the USET Medal Finals and became the first and youngest rider to win both titles in the same year.

== Career ==
Ward won the Hampton Classic Grand Prix aboard his Selle Francais bay gelding, Twist Du Valon, in 1998 and 1999. They were the first rider-horse combination to win the Classic's Grand Prix back-to-back two years in a row. Ward became the youngest rider ever to reach the $1 million prize money mark in grand prix competition in 1999.

At the 2004 Olympic Games, Ward won the team jumping gold representing the United States.

Ward rode with a broken collarbone in the 2005 Samsung Super League when the United States team won the Championship.

Ward found himself at the center of controversy at the 2010 World Cup Final in Geneva, Switzerland. His mount, Sapphire, was eliminated after the second round of jumping due to hypersensitivity in her left forelimb. Sapphire was second in both rounds prior to elimination, and was at the top of the overall standings at the time of the disqualification. McLain challenged the ruling to the FEI. In July 2010, the FEI and McLain Ward agreed, to avoid extensive litigation, that Sapphire was incorrectly eliminated. However, Sapphire's disqualification from the final round of the World Cup remained in place. The FEI also decided to develop mandatory guidelines for hypersensitivity tests.

In 2010, Ward was featured in the television series A Rider's Story along with fellow Olympian Laura Kraut.

On the evening of January 14, 2012, when Ward was riding Oh d'Eole in the $30,000 Surpass Grand Prix, Ward suffered an injury, hitting his kneecap on a jump standard. Ward was to heal for eight weeks.

Ward's horse Sapphire was retired May 14, 2012 at the Devon Horse Show. That night, Ward won the $100,000 Wells Fargo Grand Prix of Devon. November 28, 2012 Ward won the $10,000 Welcome Stake aboard Ilan Ferder and Missy Clark's Zhum CW, a Dutch Warmblood (KWPN).

At the 2012 Olympics in London, Ward rode for the USA Olympic Equestrian team. He placed 29th in Individual Jumping-Final Round A, 24th in Individual Jumping-Third Qualifier, 6th in Team Jumping Final Round 2, 20th in Individual Jumping Second-Qualifier, 7th in Team Jumping Finial Round 1, 1st in Individual Jumping-Final Round, and 5th in Team Jumping-Qualification Round 1.

At the 2016 Summer Olympics, Ward again rode for the U.S. Team. His mount was HH Azur, owned by Double H Farms and Francois Mathy. At the time of the Olympics Azur was 10. He earned a team silver medal, and placed 9th individually. He stepped into the role of anchor for the team on the final day of team competition after teammate Beezie Madden's horse suffered an injury. He had near perfect rounds all week, dropping only one rail all week.

In 2017 McLain won the Longines FEI World Cup Championship. It was his 17th appearance at the final. The highest he had placed up till then was 2nd in 2009. He won riding his 2016 Olympic mount HH Azur, an 11 year old mare. He completed the week with no penalties after five rounds of jumping, one rail (four faults) ahead of the second place rider.

In April 2017, McLain Ward was ranked #1 in the Longines FEI world rankings for the first time. He was ranked #1 through June 2017, but in July 2017, Kent Farrington was ranked #1 and McLain Ward was ranked #2 in the world. This was the first time 2 American stood at the top of the Longines FEI world rankings.

Ward currently has horses of his own, as well as riding for owners such as Double H Farm of Ridgefield, Conn. As of 2018, he is now starting to train. During the World Equestrian Games in Tryon, he taught rider and teammate Adrienne Sternlicht.

Recently, Ward has won 5 Grand Prixs at the during the 2020 winter circuit in Wellington, Florida.

In 2026, he began training with Stella Wasserman, the daughter of Casey Wasserman, to prepare her to compete in the 2028 Olympics as a member of the Israeli show jumping team.

== International Championship Results ==
Results
| Year | Event | Horse | Placing | Notes |
|---|---|---|---|---|
| 1995 | World Cup Final | Orchestre | 10th | |
| 1996 | World Cup Final | Omnibus | 24th | |
| 1997 | World Cup Final | | 38th | |
| 1998 | World Cup Final | Orchestre | 39th | |
| 1999 | World Cup Final | Beneton | 17th | |
| 2002 | World Cup Final | Viktor | 4th | |
| 2003 | World Cup Final | Viktor / Onyx 66 | 23rd | |
| 2004 | World Cup Final | Goldika 559 | 38th | |
| 2004 | Olympic Games | Sapphire | 1st place, gold medalist(s) | Team |
| 2004 | Olympic Games | Sapphire | 27th | Individual |
| 2005 | World Cup Final | Sapphire | 16th | |
| 2006 | World Equestrian Games | Sapphire | 2nd place, silver medalist(s) | Team |
| 2006 | World Equestrian Games | Sapphire | 7th | Individual |
| 2007 | World Cup Final | Sapphire | 8th | |
| 2008 | Olympic Games | Sapphire | 1st place, gold medalist(s) | Team |
| 2008 | Olympic Games | Sapphire | 5th | Individual |
| 2009 | World Cup Final | Sapphire | 2nd place, silver medalist(s) | |
| 2010 | World Cup Final | Sapphire | 30th | |
| 2010 | World Equestrian Games | Sapphire | 10th | Team |
| 2010 | World Equestrian Games | Sapphire | 7th | Individual |
| 2011 | World Cup Final | Antares F / Rothchild | 10th | |
| 2011 | Pan American Games | Nikita F | 1st place, gold medalist(s) | Team |
| 2011 | Pan American Games | Nikita F | 4th | Individual |
| 2012 | Olympic Games | Antares F | 6th | Team |
| 2012 | Olympic Games | Antares F | 29th | Individual |
| 2013 | World Cup Final | Super Trooper De Ness | 5th | |
| 2014 | World Cup Final | HH Carlos Z / Rothchild | 9th | |
| 2014 | World Equestrian Games | Rothchild | 3rd place, bronze medalist(s) | Team |
| 2014 | World Equestrian Games | Rothchild | 5th | Individual |
| 2015 | World Cup Final | Rothchild | 20th | |
| 2015 | Pan American Games | Rothchild | 3rd place, bronze medalist(s) | Team |
| 2015 | Pan American Games | Rothchild | 1st place, gold medalist(s) | Individual |
| 2016 | Olympic Games | HH Azur | 2nd place, silver medalist(s) | Team |
| 2016 | Olympic Games | HH Azur | 9th | Individual |
| 2017 | World Cup Final | HH Azur | 1st place, gold medalist(s) | |
| 2018 | World Cup Final | HH Azur | 4th | |
| 2018 | World Equestrian Games | Clinta | 1st place, gold medalist(s) | Team |
| 2018 | World Equestrian Games | Clinta | 4th | Individual |
| 2021 | 2020 Olympic Games | Contagious | 2nd place, silver medalist(s) | Team |
| 2022 | World Cup Final | Contagious | 7th | |
| 2022 | World Championships | Contagious | | |
| 2023 | World Cup Final | Callas | 23rd (tie) | |

- EL = Eliminated
- RET = Retired
- WD = Withdrew

== Personal life ==
Ward's father, Barney Ward, was involved in the show jumping horse killings scandal in the 1980s and 1990s, in which expensive horses were killed as part of an insurance fraud scheme; he pleaded guilty in 1996 and served three years in federal prison, followed by three years probation. Barney died of cancer in 2012.

Ward married in October 2008 and has two daughters: Lilly who was born in February 2015 and Madison born in February 2020. His hobbies include golf and basketball.
