= Barney Ward =

American showjumper and horse trainer

Barney Ward (1941 - October 28, 2012) was an American showjumper and horse trainer, known for his involvement in the show jumping horse killings scandal. He is the father of Olympic showjumper McLain Ward.

== Career ==
Barney Ward grew up in Providence, Rhode Island. He rode horses as a child but did not receive formal instruction. He graduated from the University of Rhode Island and then played football professionally for a year.

Ward worked for various horse farms before going into business on his own in 1967. By the late 1970s, he had established Castle Hill Farm in Brewster, New York. Ward was one of the top grand prix riders in the 1960s, 1970s, and 1980s, despite breaking his neck in 1978. Ward set a puissance record at the 1975 National Horse Show, clearing a 7'5" jump. He won the 1983 $15,000 Mercedes Benz Grand Prix of Devon.

=== Horse Killings ===
Barney Ward was involved in killing horses for insurance money, a scandal called "one of the biggest, most gruesome stories in sports." He acted as a middleman for horse hitman Tommy Burns. Paul Valliere, a fellow trainer and close friend of Ward's, was also involved in the scandal. In 1994, Ward was charged with arranging the killings of four horses. He claimed he was innocent of the charges, but eventually pleaded guilty to conspiracy. He was sentenced on June 14, 1996 and served three years in federal prison, followed by three years of probation. He was ordered by U.S. District Judge George M. Marovich to make a restitution of $200,000 to one of the defrauded insurance companies. The American Horse Show Association - the forerunner of the United States Equestrian Federation - barred him for life. As a result, he was unable to watch his son McLain Ward compete. In a 1999 interview, Ward said, "I made a mistake not coming forward" about the insurance scheme.

== Personal life ==
Ward married Kristine Lindsey and they had two sons: Jay and McLain. Ward and Kristine later divorced. Ward subsequently married Relda Esterhuyse and had his youngest son Dylan Ward. Ward was supportive of his son McLain's desire to ride professionally.

== Death and legacy ==
Ward died from prostate cancer on October 27, 2012, at age 71.

After Ward's death, industry professionals noted that he was a knowledgeable trainer and great rider despite his involvement in the horse murders.

Ward advised his son McLain throughout his riding career. McLain is a four-time Olympic medalist in showjumping.
