= D. E. Makepeace Company =

- U.S. National Register of Historic Places
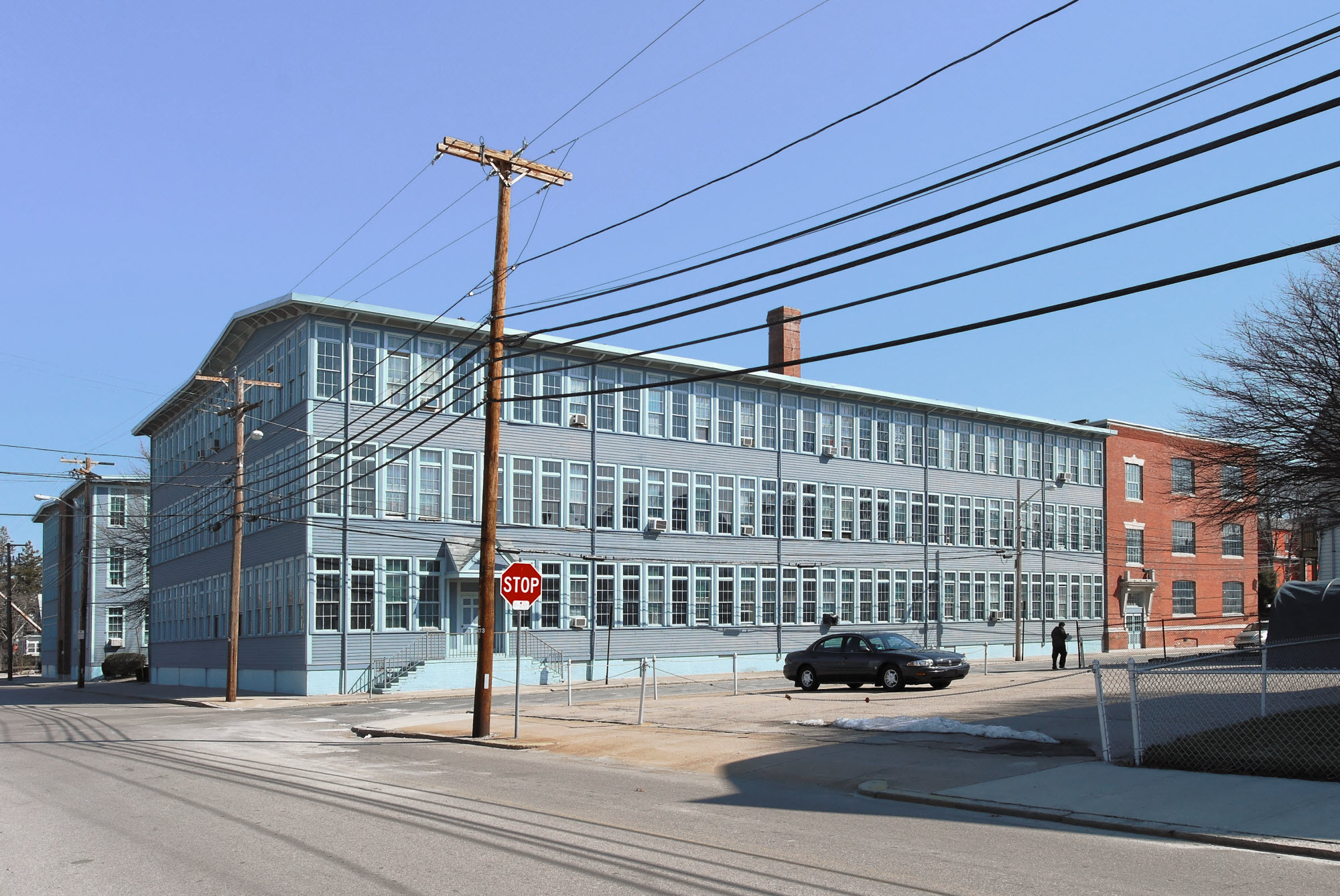
- 46 Pine St

- Location within Massachusetts Location within the United States
- Location: Attleboro, Massachusetts
- Coordinates: 41°56′32″N 71°16′52″W
- Area: 1.2 acres (0.49 ha)
- Built: 1899
- NRHP reference No.: 85001577
- Added to NRHP: July 18, 1985

The D. E. Makepeace Company is a historic industrial building at 46 Pine Street in Attleboro, Massachusetts. Built in 1899-1900, it is one of the city's best examples of a jewelry factory building of the period. The Makepeace Company was a major contributor to the city's reputation at the turn of the 20th century as America's jewelry capital. The building, now converted to residences, was listed on the National Register of Historic Places in 1985.

== Description and history ==
The former Makepeace Company plant is located on the east side of downtown Attleboro, occupying the western half of a block bounded by Park Avenue and Pine, Dunham and Gardner Streets. It is a large U-shaped wood frame structure, three stories in height, with a flat roof. Bands of sash windows line each level, with entrances in the U and on the outside near the corner of Pine and Dunham Streets. The northern and southern legs of the U are of heavy timber construction, while the connecting eastern section is of concrete block construction with a brick exterior. Projecting into the central courtyard from the southern wing is the factory's original boiler house.

The D.E. Makepeace Company was founded by David E. Makepeace in 1885, with original facilities in Providence, Rhode Island. Makepeace moved the firm to Attleboro in 1888, leasing space in other buildings prior to construction of this building's south wing in 1899-1900. The north wing was added c. 1903, as a virtual duplicate of the first part. The connecting section was added in 1915. Makepeace was one of the leading employers in the city during its heyday as a leading jewelry manufacturing center. It specialized in plating precious metals as a preliminary step for other firms, which used their products to produce finished works for retail sale. Makepeace moved its operations to Plainville in 1979; this building was converted into residences in 1984.

== See also ==
- National Register of Historic Places listings in Bristol County, Massachusetts
