= Marshall Arisman =

American painter (1938–2022)

- Born: 1938 (age 87–88)
- Education: San Francisco Art Institute (1988–1991)
- Occupation: Painter
- Known for: Labor-intensive oil painting; layered sanding technique

Marshall Arisman (October 14, 1938 – April 22, 2022) was an American illustrator, painter, storyteller, and educator.

== Biography ==
Arisman was born in Jamestown, New York, on October 14, 1938, where he grew up on a dairy farm. He studied advertising art at the Pratt Institute, graduating in 1960. He received an Ida Gaskell Grant to travel and study in Europe after graduating. He completed military service, then began his career as a graphic designer, working for General Motors.

== Career ==
While working as a graphic designer for General Motors, Arisman took evening courses in figure drawing. He went on to produce illustrations for major American periodicals including The New York Times, Mother Jones, The Nation, OMNI, Time, and Penthouse. He has also illustrated books, including Fitcher's Bird (1983), and Frozen Images (1974), published by Visual Arts Press.

Arisman created a multimedia installation work titled The Last Tribe (2009). An exploration of the theme of nuclear annihilation, the work incorporates painting, sculpture, and video. The video can be viewed online. Arisman's paintings have been exhibited in a number of one-man shows in the United States, Europe, and Japan. Permanent collections that include Arisman's paintings include the Brooklyn Museum, the Smithsonian, and the Museum of American Art. His show Sacred Monkeys was the first American exhibit to be shown in Mainland China, and his work is included in a permanent collection in China.

More recently, he has exhibited the Ayahuasca Series, a series of oil paintings, which is in part based on the religious rituals of the Quechua people. His Ayahuasca Series was on exhibit at the Zadok Gallery in Miami, Florida, from January 1 to May 1, 2012.

Arisman released an album of his own stories, Cobalt Blue, in 2008.

He was chair of the degree program "Illustration as Visual Essay" at the School of Visual Arts in New York City.

== Themes and influences ==
Violence and predation are central themes in many of Arisman's works. His early work, Frozen Images (1974), was a reflection on "personal, environmental, and media-driven" violence. Arisman's illustrations and paintings are characteristically dark, expressionistic depictions of figures in tortured postures; torn flesh, blood, and violent force recur throughout his works, depicted with smeared brush strokes against black shadowy backgrounds. Other works, such as Charging Buffalo (2008), while remaining expressionistic in style, are less menacing, and may be interpreted as reflections on primal connections with the environment and with a regenerative life force. As influences, he has cited André François, Goya, Velázquez, Francis Bacon, Lucian Freud, and primitive art.

In his illustration work, Arisman approaches each piece without making a distinction between commercial or fine art. The barrier is one that he has been confronted with throughout his career: "the fine art world stigmatizes people for illustrating [...] Every gallery tells me to quit illustration".

== Publications ==
Arisman has published several books, including:

- Frozen Images (1973)
- Art of the Times
- Artists' Christmas Cards
- Images of Labor
- Fitcher's Bird
- The Wolf Who Loved Music (2003)
- Heaven Departed
- The Cat Who Invented Bebop (2009)
- Divine Elvis
- A Postcard from Lilydale

Arisman has also co-authored Inside the Business of Illustration and co-edited The Education of an Illustrator, Teaching Illustration.

== See also ==
- Animism
- Expressionism
- Installation art
- Storytelling
