= Brightness Falls =

1992 novel by Jay McInerney

- First edition (publ. Knopf)
- Author: Jay McInerney
- Language: English
- Genre: Fiction
- Publisher: Alfred A. Knopf
- Publication date: 1992
- ISBN: 0-679-40219-5

Brightness Falls is a 1992 novel written by Jay McInerney. His fourth novel, it tells of a couple named Russell and Corrine Calloway who meet in college. Their story continues in McInerney's 2006 novel The Good Life, which follows them into middle age.

The book central characters are the fictitious editor Russell Calloway and his wife Corrine, who works as a stockbroker.

The title is taken from a line in the poem "A Litany in Time of Plague" (1593) by the English poet Thomas Nashe. The full line furnished the title for the James Tiptree, Jr., novel, Brightness Falls from the Air, in which "brightness" is a euphemism for destruction. (A 1942 novel about life in the Blitz, by English writer Nigel Balchin, was entitled Darkness Falls from the Air.)

This novel was written before the events of September 11, 2001, while its sequel The Good Life is about those events.
