= Bright Lights, Big City (novel) =

1984 novel by Jay McInerney

- First edition cover
- Author: Jay McInerney
- Language: English
- Publisher: Vintage Books
- Publication date: August 12, 1984
- Publication place: United States
- Media type: Print (hardback & paperback)

Bright Lights, Big City is a novel by American author Jay McInerney, published by Vintage Books on August 12, 1984. It is written about a character's time spent caught up in, and notably escaping from, the early 1980s New York City fast lane. The novel is written in the second person, an unusual narrative method in English language fiction.

== Plot ==
The story's protagonist is a 24-year-old writer who works as a fact-checker for a highbrow magazine for which he had once hoped to write. By night, he is a cocaine-using party-goer seeking to lose himself in the hedonism of the 1980s yuppie party scene, often going to a nightclub called Heartbreak.

His wife, Amanda, recently left him, and he copes with this by pretending nothing happened and telling no one that she is gone. The two had met in Kansas City; the protagonist moves with her to New York City, where she begins a modeling career that quickly takes off. After flying out to Paris for Fashion Week, she calls the protagonist to inform him that she is leaving him for another man and to pursue her career. Initially hopeful that she will return someday, the protagonist eventually resorts to searching for her at a fashion event, publicly humiliating himself while failing to garner more attention from her than a brief look. He obsesses over every item she owned in his apartment, every modeling photo, and every club she visited, even repeatedly visiting a mannequin based on her. His partying and his personal troubles begin to affect his work. He eventually comes to recognize Amanda's superficiality, becoming disillusioned both with her and the materialistic culture of New York in general. He reveals that the true reason for his spiral downward was his mother's death, which actually took place a year ago. He realizes that he had married Amanda because he thought it would make his mother happy. After his mother's death, he was in shock and it wasn't until Amanda left him that he began really grieving over his mother, causing his cocaine addiction and reckless abandon.

== Adaptations ==
McInerney adapted his novel into the screenplay for the film Bright Lights, Big City, released in 1988. In 1999, an off-Broadway stage musical was produced by the New York Theatre Workshop, written by Paul Scott Goodman and directed by Michael Greif, with orchestrations and musical direction by Richard Barone.

== Cover ==
Scenes in the novel take place at The Odeon, a restaurant in Manhattan, and the exterior of the restaurant was depicted on the book's first edition cover. McInerney has said that attorneys at his publishing house were concerned about depictions of drug use at the restaurant in the novel, so McInerney sought permission from one of the restaurant's owners, Keith McNally, to portray the restaurant in and on the book. McNally granted permission assuming the novel would not sell well.
