= The Good Life (novel) =

2006 novel by Jay McInerney

- First edition cover
- Author: Jay McInerney
- Publisher: Knopf
- Publication date: February 1, 2006
- ISBN: 0-375-41140-2

The Good Life is a 2006 novel by American writer Jay McInerney. A sequel to his 1992 novel, Brightness Falls, it takes place immediately before, during, and after the events of September 11, 2001.
