= Jay McInerney =

American writer (born 1955)

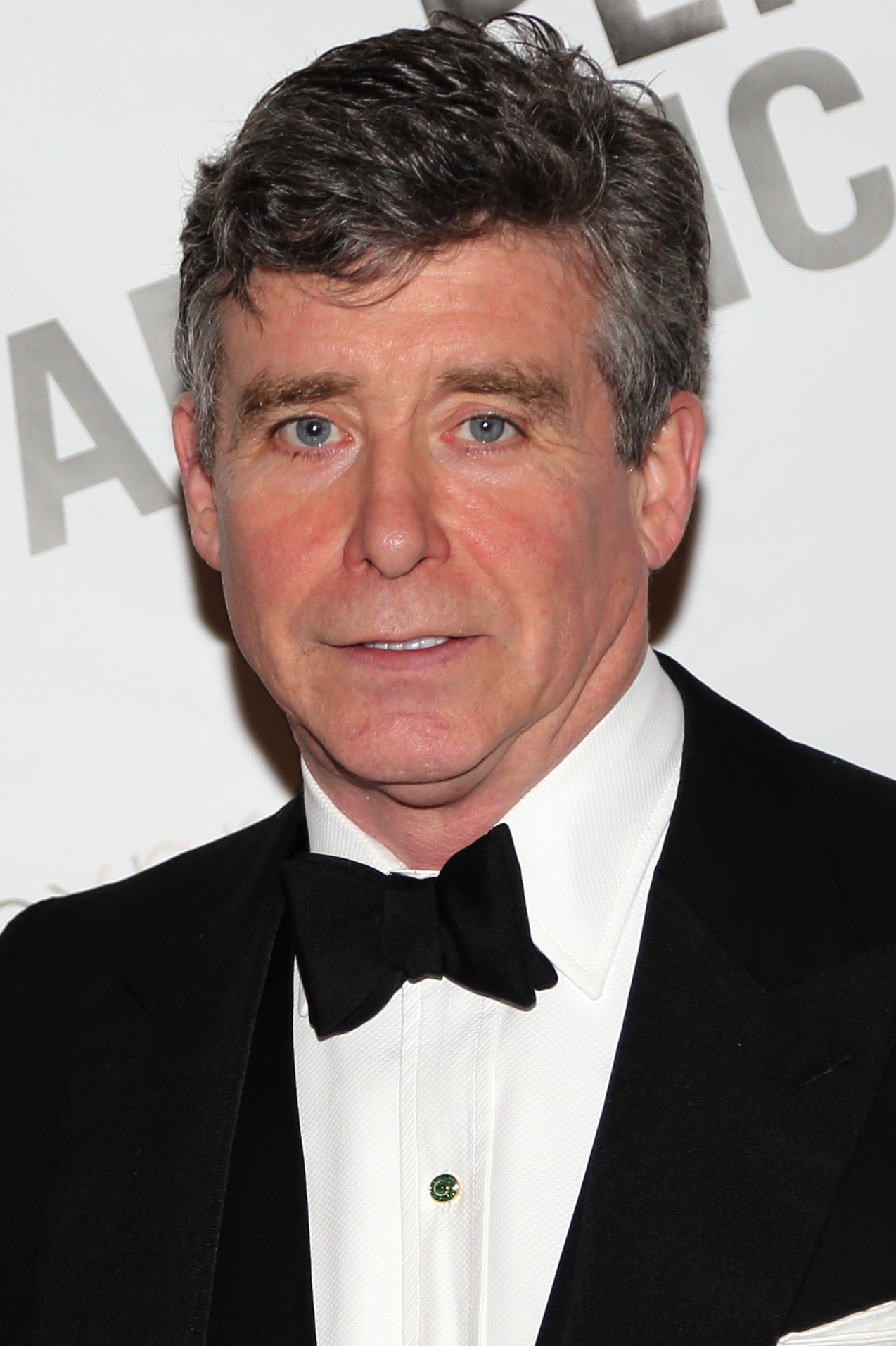
- McInerney at Pen America/Free Expression Literature in May 2014
- Born: John Barrett McInerney Jr. January 13, 1955 (age 71); Hartford, Connecticut, U.S.
- Education: Williams College; Syracuse University (MA)
- Occupation: Writer
- Spouses: Linda Rossiter; Merry Raymond; Helen Bransford; Anne Hearst (m. 2006)
- Children: 2
- Website: https://jaymcinerney.com/

John Barrett "Jay" McInerney Jr. (/ˈmækɪnɜːrni/; born January 13, 1955) is an American novelist, screenwriter, editor, and columnist. His novels include Bright Lights, Big City, Ransom, Story of My Life, Brightness Falls, and The Last of the Savages. He edited The Penguin Book of New American Voices, wrote the screenplay for the 1988 film adaptation of Bright Lights, Big City, and co-wrote the screenplay for the television film Gia, which starred Angelina Jolie. He was the wine columnist for House & Garden magazine, and his essays on wine have been collected in Bacchus & Me (2000) and A Hedonist in the Cellar (2006). His most recent novel is titled See You on the Other Side, published in 2026. In April 2010 he began writing as a wine columnist for The Wall Street Journal. In 2009, he published a book of short stories that spanned his entire career, titled How It Ended, which was named one of the 10 best books of the year by Janet Maslin of The New York Times.

== Early life and education ==
McInerney was born in 1955 in Hartford, Connecticut, the son of Marilyn Jean (Murphy) and John Barrett McInerney Sr., a corporate executive. He graduated from Williams College in 1976. At Syracuse University, he earned a Master of Arts in English and studied writing with Raymond Carver.

== Career ==
After working as a fact-checker at The New Yorker, McInerney achieved fame with his first published novel, Bright Lights, Big City. Published in 1984, the novel was unique at the time for its depiction of cocaine culture in second-person narrative. The title is taken from a 1961 blues song by Jimmy Reed. The novel established McInerney's reputation as part of a new generation of writers. Labelled the 'literary brat pack' in a 1987 article in the Village Voice, McInerney, Bret Easton Ellis and Tama Janowitz were presented as the new face of literature: young, iconoclastic and fresh. (Note: In the September/October 2005 issue of Pages magazine, the "literary brat pack" was identified retrospectively as Bret Easton Ellis, Tama Janowitz, and McInerney. Other associated authors included Donna Tartt, Susan Minot, Peter Farrelly, Mark Lindquist, Peter J. Smith, and Mary Robison.) Five novels followed: Ransom, Story of My Life, Brightness Falls, The Last of the Savages and Model Behavior.

After the success of Bright Lights, Big City, publishers started looking for similar works about young people in urban settings. Ellis's Less than Zero, published in 1985, was promoted as following McInerney's example. McInerney, Ellis and Janowitz were based in New York City and their lives there were the subject of heavy media coverage.

Ellis used McInerney's character, Alison Poole (Story of My Life), in his novels American Psycho and Glamorama. McInerney revealed that the character of Alison Poole is based upon his former girlfriend, Rielle Hunter, then known as Lisa Druck. He described the character as "cocaine addled," and "sexually voracious" but also treated her with some sympathy. McInerney's roman à clef opened a prescient glimpse into the notorious horse murders scandal, which did not become known to the public until 1992, when Sports Illustrated magazine published a confession from the man who had murdered Lisa Druck's horse at her father's behest, in order to claim the insurance on its life.

McInerney also has a cameo role in Ellis's Lunar Park, attending the Halloween party Bret hosts at his house. It was later revealed that McInerney was not pleased with his representation in the novel.

Throughout his career, McInerney has struggled against the image of himself as both the author and protagonist of Bright Lights, Big City. In 2009, he said in an interview, "Obviously, I'm no longer a 25-year-old bon vivant, but [that] gave me what I always wanted: the opportunity to be a full-time writer. It hasn't been entirely fair to my other books, and I've had to deal with a lot of idiocy on the part of the critics and the cultural commentators." He appeared at Williams College as the commencement speaker for the Class of 2010.

== Personal life ==
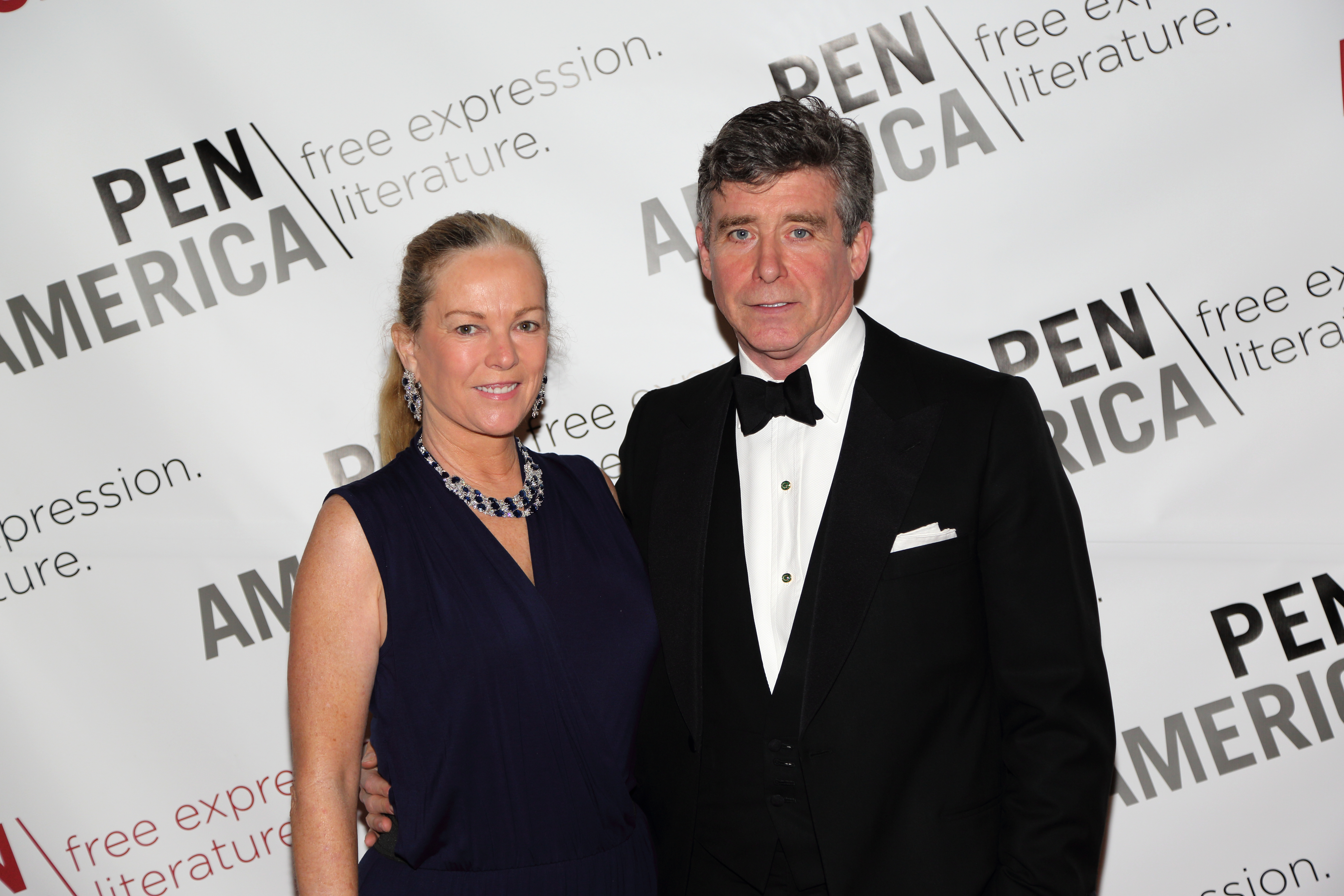
Jay McInerney and Anne Hearst McInerney in 2014

His first wife was fashion model Linda Rossiter. His second wife was writer Merry Reymond, a doctoral student in philosophy at Syracuse. For four years he lived with fashion model Marla Hanson. His third marriage, to Helen Bransford, lasted nine years, and the couple had fraternal twin children, John Barrett McInerney III and Maisie Bransford McInerney. In 2006, he married Anne Hearst.

== Bibliography ==
=== Novels ===
- Bright Lights, Big City (1984)
- Ransom (1985)
- Story of My Life (1988)
- The Last of the Savages (1997)
- Model Behavior (1998)

The Calloway tetralogy

- Brightness Falls (1992)
- The Good Life (2006)
- Bright, Precious Days (2016)
- See You on the Other Side (2026)

=== Short fiction ===
Collections

- McInerney, Jay (2009). How it ended : new and collected stories. New York: Alfred A. Knopf. ISBN 978-0307268051.
- — (2009). The Last Bachelor. London: Bloomsbury. ISBN 978-0747599845.

Stories (Note: Short stories unless otherwise noted.)

Title	Year	First published	Reprinted/collected
"The Queen and I"	1996	McInerney, Jay (1996). The Queen and I. London: Bloomsbury. ISBN 0-7475-2895-0.	McInerney, Jay (2009). How it ended : new and collected stories. New York: Alfred A. Knopf. ISBN 978-0307268051.
Con doctor			McInerney, Jay (2009). How it ended : new and collected stories. New York: Alfred A. Knopf. ISBN 978-0307268051.
"Everything is lost"	2009	McInerney, Jay (January 4, 2009). "Everything is lost". Sunday Times. London.	
"In the North-West Frontier Province"			McInerney, Jay (2009). How it ended : new and collected stories. New York: Alfred A. Knopf. ISBN 978-0307268051.
"Invisible fences"			McInerney, Jay (2009). How it ended : new and collected stories. New York: Alfred A. Knopf. ISBN 978-0307268051.
"The Madonna of turkey season"			McInerney, Jay (2009). How it ended : new and collected stories. New York: Alfred A. Knopf. ISBN 978-0307268051.
"My public service"			McInerney, Jay (2009). How it ended : new and collected stories. New York: Alfred A. Knopf. ISBN 978-0307268051.
"Smoke"			McInerney, Jay (2009). How it ended : new and collected stories. New York: Alfred A. Knopf. ISBN 978-0307268051.

=== Nonfiction ===
- Bacchus and Me: Adventures in the Wine Cellar (2000)
- A Hedonist in the Cellar: Adventures in Wine (2006)
- The Juice: Vinous Veritas (2012)

=== Critical studies and reviews of McInerney's work ===
- Waldman, Adelle (August 8–15, 2016). "Status update : Jay McInerney's trilogy about the perils of privilege". The Critics. Books. The New Yorker. Vol. 92, no. 24. pp. 72–74. (Note: Online version is titled "Jay McInerney's middle–aged malaise".)

== Film ==
- McInerney wrote the screenplay for the 1988 film adaptation of Bright Lights, Big City. Directed by James Bridges, it stars Michael J. Fox, Kiefer Sutherland, and Phoebe Cates.

== Television ==
- McInerney appeared in the series Gossip Girl as the fictional novelist Jeramiah Harris, mentor to aspiring writer Dan Humphrey
- For Hotel Room, a television series for HBO created by David Lynch, McInerney wrote the second episode "Getting Rid Of Robert", which was directed by James Signorelli.
- McInerney was interviewed for an episode of the ITV series The South Bank Show about Bret Easton Ellis.
- In 2013 McInerney presented a documentary on writer F. Scott Fitzgerald for the BBC series The Culture Show.
