= John Edwards extramarital affair =

American political sex scandal

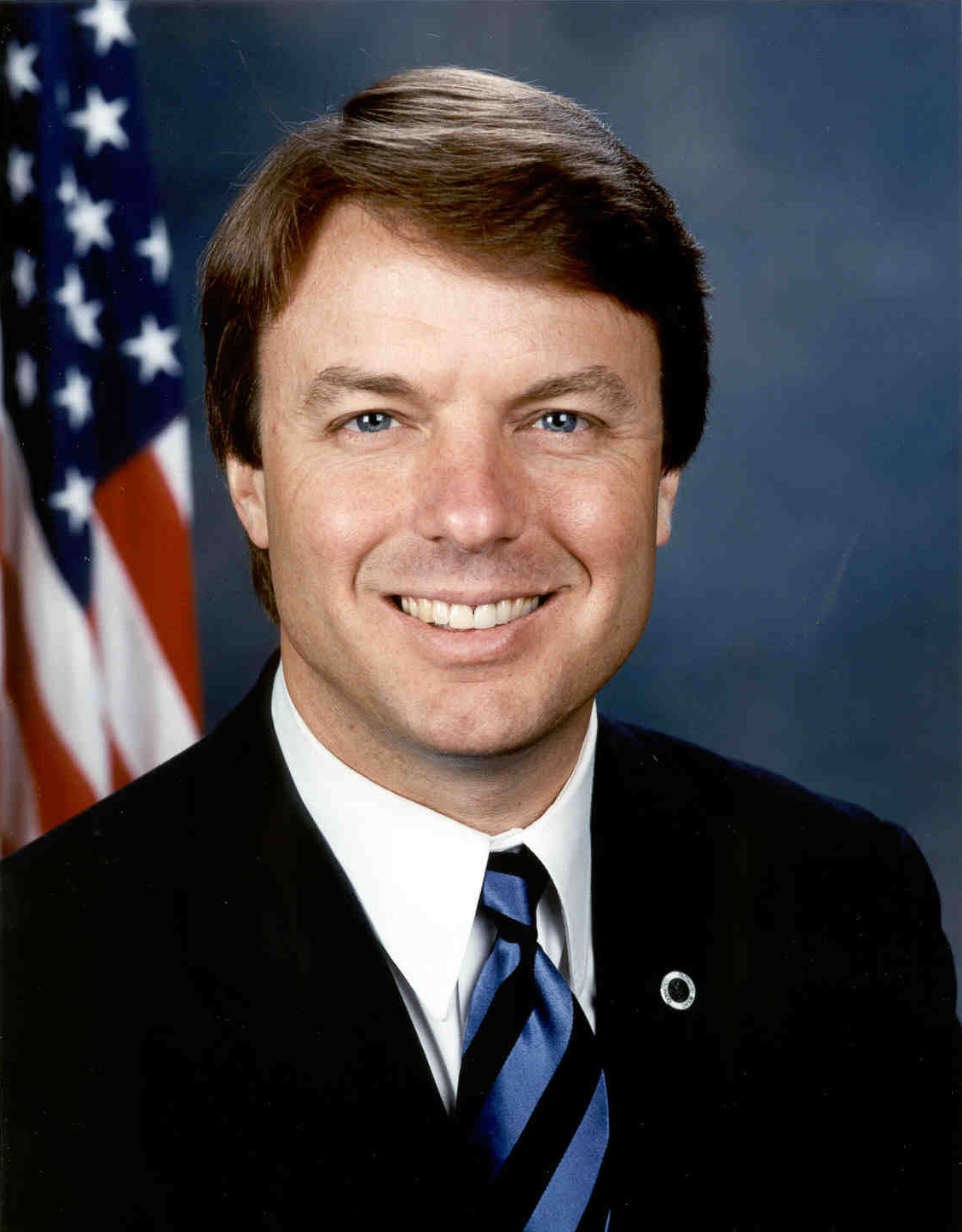
Senator John Edwards

In August 2008, John Edwards, a former United States Senator from North Carolina and a Democratic Party vice-presidential and presidential candidate, admitted to an extramarital affair, which was initially reported in December 2007 by the National Enquirer but was given little attention outside the tabloid press and political blogosphere. The Enquirer cited claims from an anonymous source that Edwards had engaged in an affair with Rielle Hunter, a filmmaker hired to work for his 2008 presidential campaign, and that Hunter had given birth to a child from the relationship. ABC News reported that Andrew Young, a member of Edwards' campaign team, stated that Edwards asked him to, "Get a doctor to fake the DNA results ... and to steal a diaper from the baby so he could secretly do a DNA test to find out if this [was] indeed his child."

In July 2008, several U.S. mainstream news outlets cited the allegations in relation to Edwards' future political career, as well as in relation to his chances of being selected as a running mate in Barack Obama's 2008 presidential bid. Then, on August 7, 2008, Edwards admitted to ABC News correspondent Bob Woodruff that he did have an extended affair with Hunter, but denied that he was the father of Hunter's baby girl. Hunter's sister claimed that Edwards was the father and publicly asked Edwards to take a paternity test to determine whether the child was his. On January 21, 2010, Edwards issued a statement admitting that he was the father of Hunter's child.

After Edwards's admission, his wife Elizabeth announced a separation from her husband with an intention to file for divorce. When Edwards first admitted to the affair, he stated that Elizabeth was in remission from breast cancer. However, it became clear that Edwards continued the affair even after he and his wife made a joint announcement that her cancer had returned and was found to be terminal. Elizabeth died of the disease at age 61 on December 7, 2010.

== Rielle Hunter and the Edwards campaign ==
In December 2006, Newsweek reported that Hunter had been hired by the Edwards campaign to produce a series of webisodes that portrayed behind-the-scenes life on the campaign trail. Hunter had pitched the idea of creating the series to Edwards when she met him at a bar in New York City, where he was attending a business meeting. The campaign paid Hunter's production company, Midline Groove, over USD$100,000 for the short documentaries that were uploaded to YouTube upon completion. In 2006, Business Week included one of the episodes as a feature in a web video.

The first apparent mention, in print form, of a possible affair between Edwards and Hunter appeared in the New York Post on August 27, 2007: a blind gossip item that asked: "Which political candidate enjoys visiting New York because he has a girlfriend who lives downtown? The pol tells her he'll marry her when his current wife is out of the picture." The mention in the Post started a tabloid and blogosphere investigation that eventually led to accusations against Hunter and Edwards.

In September 2007, Sam Stein, a political reporter for The Huffington Post, reported that the Hunter web documentaries had been removed from the Internet and were no longer accessible. Representatives from the Edwards campaign stated that the material could not be used due to campaign finance law. Several days later, The Huffington Post reported that the videos had been reposted to YouTube by an anonymous user.

== Initial National Enquirer allegations ==
On October 10, 2007, the National Enquirer published an article claiming that Edwards had engaged in an extramarital affair with an unnamed female campaign worker. On the same day, Stein published another article in The Huffington Post that contained additional details about Hunter, including her name and the web videos that she had produced. The following day, October 11, New York magazine published a piece linking Hunter to the Enquirer allegations.

Initially, both Edwards and Hunter denied the relationship claims. Edwards said the Enquirer story was "made up", further stating, "I've been in love with the same woman for 30-plus years," referring to his wife Elizabeth, "and as anybody who's been around us knows, she's an extraordinary human being, warm, loving, beautiful, sexy and as good a person as I have ever known. So the story's just false." Hunter's attorney issued a denial via Jerome Armstrong, a political blogger and founder of MyDD, stating, "The innuendos and lies that have appeared on the internet and in the National Enquirer concerning John Edwards are not true, completely unfounded and ridiculous." David Perel, the Editor-in-Chief at the Enquirer, did not back down from the paper's allegations, stating, "The original story was 100% accurate."

The Enquirer published a follow-up story that included a photograph of a visibly pregnant Hunter on December 19, 2007. The tabloid alleged that, according to its anonymous source, Hunter was claiming that Edwards was the father of her child. The article also claimed that Hunter had relocated to a gated community in Chapel Hill, North Carolina, near Andrew Young, a former official with the Edwards campaign, who had claimed paternity of Hunter's child. As with Hunter's initial denial of the affair, Young's paternity claim had been issued to Armstrong and published on MyDD.

CBS News journalist Bob Schieffer, when asked about the allegations on Imus in the Morning, stated, "I believe that's a story that we will be avoiding, because it appears to me that there's absolutely nothing to it ... This seems to be just sort of a staple of modern campaigns, that you got through at least one love child, which turns out not to be a love child. And I think we can all do better than this one." Mickey Kaus, a journalist at Slate, speculated that the lack of mainstream coverage was motivated by a desire not to harm Elizabeth Edwards, who was fighting cancer at the time. Kaus also considered the possibility of news organizations taking a "wait-and-see" attitude, pending the results of the 2008 Iowa caucuses.

Edwards withdrew from the Democratic primaries on January 30, 2008, after finishing third in New Hampshire and South Carolina.

== Hotel encounter with reporters ==
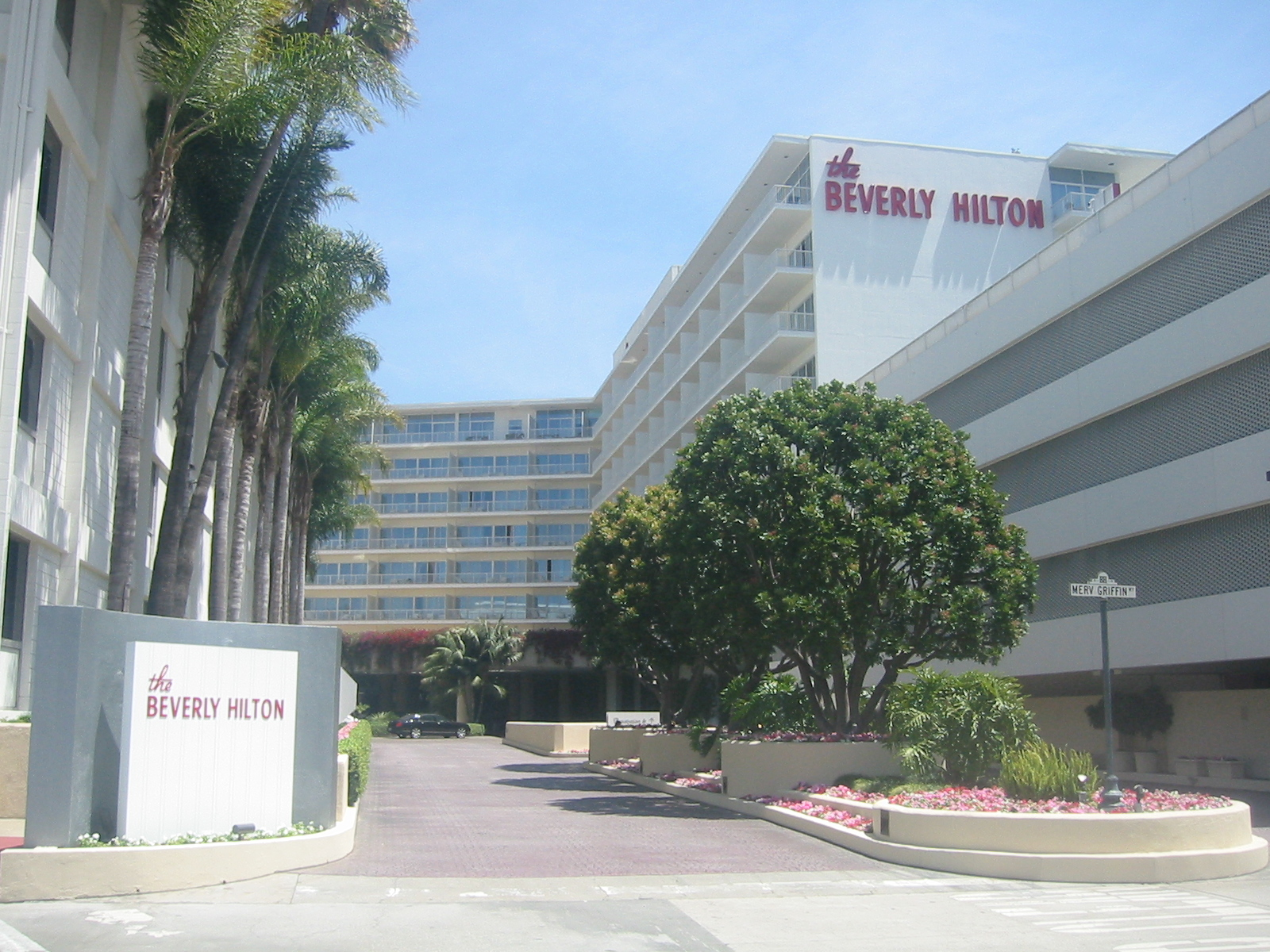
The Beverly Hilton Hotel, where Edwards encountered the National Enquirer reporters

According to Perel, the Enquirer had received information stating that Edwards would be visiting Hunter and her child at the Beverly Hilton Hotel in Beverly Hills, California, on the evening of July 21, 2008, and the paper dispatched several reporters to the hotel. The team of Enquirer reporters encountered Edwards on the hotel premises sometime after 2 a.m. on the morning of July 22. According to Perel, Edwards, who was not a registered guest of the hotel, retreated from the reporters to a washroom, where he remained until being escorted from the premises by hotel security. The encounter between Edwards and the Enquirer reporters was later confirmed by a hotel guard interviewed by Fox News. Edwards' spokespeople did not respond to Fox's request for comment on the incident.

In articles published immediately after the hotel encounter, the Enquirer claimed to be in possession of evidence showing that Edwards had visited Hunter and her child in the Hilton for several hours, including a videotape of Hunter entering the room, where she allegedly met Edwards, and one of Edwards leaving the same room. However, the paper declined a request from Fox to release photos or videotape of the incident. In an interview with Radar, Perel said that the Enquirer would release the photos when "the time is right." The Enquirer later stated that it had filed a "criminal complaint" against the hotel's security over its conduct during the encounter, but the Beverly Hills Police Department said that there was no criminal complaint and that only an "incident report" was under investigation.

When Edwards was questioned at a New Orleans event on July 23, he stated, "I have no idea what you're asking about. I've responded, consistently, to these tabloid allegations by saying I don't respond to these lies and you know that ... and I stand by that." On the same day, Hunter appeared on the television program Extra, describing the Enquirer story as "completely unfounded and ridiculous".

On August 6, 2008, the National Enquirer published a blurry photo that allegedly portrayed Edwards holding Hunter's baby.

== Media coverage ==
=== Coverage of the allegations ===
Aside from the Fox News story on July 25, mainstream news sources did not immediately report the story. Articles describing the Enquirer allegations were eventually published by New York and Radar magazines. The claims were also mentioned in opinion columns and in-house blogs of several other papers. On July 23, Glenn Beck talked about the story on his Headline News program, recommending that Edwards sue the Enquirer if its story was proven false. On that same day, Roxanne Roberts, a style writer for The Washington Post, said, "We have no evidence this is true. Lots of juicy details—enough so Edwards may feel he has to address the issue, especially if it's not true and there's an innocent explanation. Or not. That won't stop anyone from talking about it, but let's assume, until we know the facts, that this could be false."

On July 25, in response to a question as to whether The Washington Post was investigating the claims, political reporter Jonathan Weisman stated, "Yes, and to be quite honest, we're waiting to see the pictures the National Enquirer says it will publish this weekend. That said, Edwards is no longer an elected official and is not running for any office now. Don't expect wall-to-wall coverage." Meanwhile, on that same day, Kaus published an e-mail sent to Slate the day before from Tony Pierce, an editor at the Los Angeles Times. It was sent to the Times' in-house bloggers, and, referring to the Edwards allegations, stated, "I am asking you all not to blog about this topic until further notified." Kaus portrayed the email as a "gag" order. In an online interview, Pierce defended the e-mail, stating that it was the result of a decision by senior editors at the Times to allow time for the newspaper's Metro Desk to investigate the allegations. Pierce also pointed out that a Times blogger had already posted a story on the Enquirer claims. On August 8, in response to a high number of e-mails to the Times, National Editor Scott Kraft stated that "this strikes us as a legitimate story". The newspaper's bloggers subsequently posted a story on the topic.

Over the period of July 27–28, the claims and speculation about the possible impact on Edwards' political career, from the incident thus far, were picked up by several papers outside the U.S., including the London Times, The Independent, Der Spiegel, Irish Independent, and The Times of India.

In the U.S. political blogosphere, the story was covered by Kaus; Alex Coppelman at Salon.com; Jack Shafer at Slate; Rachel Sklar and Lee Stranahan at The Huffington Post; independent political pundit James Joyner; Rod Dreher at The Dallas Morning News; and Guy Adams at The Independent.

Some of the coverage alleged mainstream media bias due to Edwards' Democratic affiliation. Others voiced contempt for tabloid papers like the Enquirer and compared the coverage to that of a scandal involving Republican Senator Larry Craig. Others claimed that the Enquirer was reliable in regard to scandal reporting, noting the reporting on the Gary Hart-Donna Rice affair in 1988, Jesse Jackson's out-of-wedlock child, and Rush Limbaugh's prescription drug addiction in 2006.

Non-coverage was also discussed. Some stated that the non-coverage was motivated by sympathy for Elizabeth Edwards. Several prominent sites criticized the omission of information about the allegations, most notably Gawker.com. For instance, as of August 6, CNN had not mentioned the story and MSNBC had mentioned it only once. Several pundits stated that Edwards was "fair game" for reporting on the allegations because he had been recently identified as a potential candidate for vice president or attorney general for Barack Obama, and that Edwards himself had made his marital fidelity an issue in his campaign.

Blogosphere claims of a media "blackout" extended to Wikipedia and its biographical article on Edwards. The Wikipedia biography was later changed to include a mention of the allegations' potential impact on Edwards' political career. The controversy over the Wikipedia page was covered by Wired magazine and Kansas City Star columnist Aaron Barnhart, who opined the addition of the information to the Wikipedia article influenced later media coverage of the allegations.

On July 31, a late-night talk program played part of a David Letterman "Top 10" list that alluded to the charges. On the same night, The O'Reilly Factor played a clip of a Jay Leno monologue from The Tonight Show that mentioned the story. Altogether, Fox News had run stories or discussed the matter six times by August 6, more than any other cable news organization.

=== Edwards admits the affair ===
On August 8, in a statement that coincided with the opening ceremony of the 2008 Olympic Games, Edwards admitted to the affair but denied he was the father of the child, expressing his willingness to take a paternity test. His statement included:

In 2006, I made a serious error in judgment and conducted myself in a way that was disloyal to my family and to my core beliefs. I recognized my mistake and I told my wife that I had a liaison with another woman, and I asked for her forgiveness. Although I was honest in every painful detail with my family, I did not tell the public. When a supermarket tabloid told a version of the story, I used the fact that the story contained many falsities to deny it. But being 99 percent honest is no longer enough ...

On the same day, Elizabeth Edwards released a statement that first appeared on the liberal blog, The Daily Kos. The statement said that, in 2006, "John had made a terrible mistake," though she went on to praise her husband for "courage in the face of shame." She also said that she hoped people would watch the interview that aired later that night on the ABC News program Nightline, in which her husband admitted the affair to Woodruff. Elizabeth, in her statement, criticized the claims that her husband fathered a child as an "absurd lie in a tabloid publication." Her seemingly willing participation in the efforts to cover up the affair have also been called into question. "I think she's complicit," said Brad Crone, a Raleigh-based Democratic consultant. "Obviously, she knew. While she's the victim, she clearly didn't stand in the way of the cover-up."

On August 12, a friend of Hunter's, Pigeon O'Brien, informed CBS News that Edwards had lied about the timeline of the affair. She claimed the affair began in February 2006, six months earlier than the time Edwards had hired Hunter to start working on his political action committee and when he had claimed that the affair had begun. O'Brien also stated that the affair was not a brief liaison, but a mutual, committed relationship based on love, or so Edwards had led Hunter to believe.

On August 13, Hunter's sister, Roxanne Druck Marshall, gave an interview to CBS News in which she personally apologized to Edwards' wife for her sister's behavior. She also claimed Edwards had lied in his confession, stating the affair was of a longer duration than the timeframe that he had claimed and was still ongoing. Marshall also stated that, in the days after the story broke, Edwards provided Hunter and her baby with a new and secret domicile to prevent media reporters from finding her. She also called upon Edwards to tell the complete truth about the affair. That same day, an article from CBS News reported that, "Edwards may be in legal jeopardy if it could be shown that [campaign] funds were used for purposes other than the ones that they had been assigned for." The New York Daily News also reported that, when questioned about the affair by reporters, Mimi Hockman, Hunter's partner in Midline Groove, "said the contract they signed with John Edwards had a 'hefty' confidentiality clause that bars her from talking." Two days earlier, on August 11, Hockman had been questioned by reporters from the Star-Ledger at her home and reportedly told them, "I'm contractually prohibited from talking to you."

On August 18, David Carr of The New York Times wrote that while the Enquirer can be inaccurate, its revelations about the Edwards affair were a service to the public:

"'There are some stories, especially ones that occur in the bedroom, where mainstream media outlets sometimes can't venture—or at least they can't find it in themselves to lead the charge. But it would be hard to argue that the body politic is not enriched by the recent revelations that Mr. Edwards is not who we thought he was, even balanced against the many stories the Enquirer gets wrong.' (Even in his confession, Mr. Edwards wrinkled his nose and suggested that the allegations had originated with 'supermarket tabloids', as if the method of conveyance absolved him of the deeds described.)"

== Birth certificate ==
On August 1, the Enquirer published an article naming Hunter's child. Mainstream news organizations subsequently obtained a copy of the birth certificate, confirming that a girl named Frances Quinn Hunter had been born at Santa Barbara Cottage Hospital on February 27, 2008. The birth certificate listed the mother's name as "Rielle Jaya James Druck," while the child was given the surname "Hunter"; no father's name was listed. Media reports linked the Druck and Hunter surnames on the birth certificate to conclude that the mother was Rielle Hunter; the reports also noted that the child was born approximately two months after Young's claimed paternity had been announced by Hunter and Young.

When questioned about the omission of the father's name from the birth certificate, Hunter's attorney stated, "A lot of women do that", and that the issue was "a personal matter" between Hunter and Young, before declining to comment further.

In late-July and early-August 2008, news outlets reported that Edwards was avoiding further questions from reporters about the Enquirer claims. WCNC-TV in Charlotte, North Carolina, reported that Edwards' political career was "effectively frozen", pending resolution of the allegations.

== Payments to Hunter and Young ==
In August 2008, Fred Baron, Edwards' campaign finance chairman, told NBC News that he had been providing financial assistance to both Hunter and Young without Edwards' knowledge; he further stated that no campaign funds had been used. Reportedly, Young had also successfully solicited funds from Rachel Lambert Mellon, also known as "Bunny" Mellon, a 99-year-old heiress to the Mellon fortune. Baron died two months later.

== Reactions ==
In August 2008, senior figures in the Democratic Party warned that Edwards' failure to respond to the allegations could affect his role at the 2008 Democratic National Convention. According to Donald Fowler, former Democratic National Committee chair, "If there is not an explanation that's satisfactory, acceptable and meets high moral standards, the answer is 'no,' [Edwards] would not be a prime candidate to make a major address to the convention." Gary Pearce, who ran Edwards' 1998 Senate race, said, "It's a very damaging thing. ... If it's not true, [Edwards] has got to stand up and say, 'This is not true. That is not my child and I'm going to take legal action against the people who are spreading these lies.' It's not enough to say, 'That's tabloid trash.'" Edwards' admission that he engaged in an affair came less than a day after these warnings were published.

Former congressman David Bonior, Edwards' 2008 presidential campaign manager, stated: "Thousands of friends of the senator and his supporters have put their faith and confidence in him, and he's let them down. They've been betrayed by his action." When asked about Edwards' future in public service, Bonior further stated, "You can't lie in politics and expect to have people's confidence."

== Alleged campaign staffers "doomsday" plan ==
In May 2009, ABC News political correspondent George Stephanopoulos reported that Edwards campaign staffers became cognizant of the affair in early 2008. Staff members said that if it appeared Edwards was on his way to winning the Democratic nomination, they intended to sabotage his campaign for the benefit of the party. Edwards' senior adviser, Joe Trippi, said this report was "complete bullshit". He added, "No one that I know had such a plan. I wasn't involved in a plan like that, it didn't exist, it's a fantasy." However, in August 2006, several staffers—including Josh Brumberger, Kim Rubey, and David Ginsberg—had strong suspicions about the affair and left the campaign over concerns about Hunter. Rubey and Ginsberg later discussed their obligation to the party to come forward with what they knew, after finding Young's paternity claim unconvincing.

== Subsequent events ==
A federal grand jury investigated whether any of Edwards' campaign funds were misspent on covering up the affair and, on August 6, 2009, Hunter testified before a federal grand jury in Raleigh.

On January 21, 2010, Edwards admitted that he was, indeed, Quinn's father. In late January 2010, John and Elizabeth separated. In February 2010, the Enquirer reported that Edwards had proposed to Hunter, but that report was categorically denied by an Edwards spokesperson.

Although Young had previously stated he was the father, he recanted in a book proposal. Rielle Hunter also released a book about the relationship and announced her breakup with Edwards on the day of the book's release in 2012. On February 9, 2016, Hunter spoke on Steve Harvey in her first televised interview in almost five years, and stated she and Edwards were still dating until February 2015.

=== Legal proceedings ===
On June 3, 2011, Edwards was indicted by a North Carolina grand jury on six felony charges. He faced a maximum sentence of thirty years in prison and a $1.5 million fine, or a USD250,000 fine and/or five years imprisonment per charge. The indictment came after the failure of intensive negotiations for a plea bargain. The agreement would have meant that Edwards would have been required to plead guilty to three misdemeanor campaign finance law violations, in addition to a six-month prison sentence, but would have allowed Edwards to keep his law license.

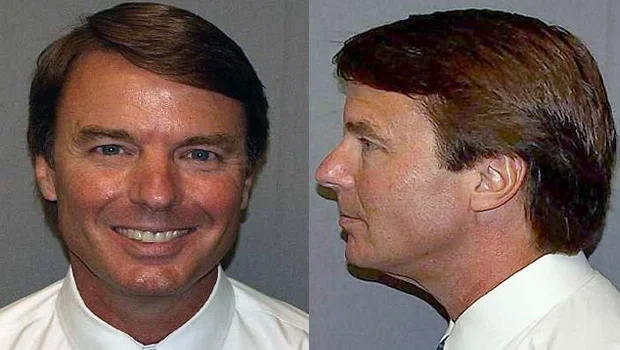
Edwards' smiling mugshot taken on June 3, 2011

After delays, due to Edwards' medical condition, jury selection for the trial began on April 12, 2012. Opening statements began on April 23. A verdict (not guilty on one count and a mistrial on the remaining five) to the trial was reached on May 31, 2012.

The trial was criticized by Republicans, such as Michael Steele and Joe Scarborough, who referred to the procedure as "an absolute waste of resources."

== See also ==
- List of federal political sex scandals in the United States
- Show jumping horse killings – Involved Rielle Hunter's father, who in 1981, when Hunter was 17, electrocuted her horse, Henry the Hawk, in order to collect a $150,000 insurance payout
