= Roger Avary =

Canadian film director, screenwriter, producer (b. 1965)

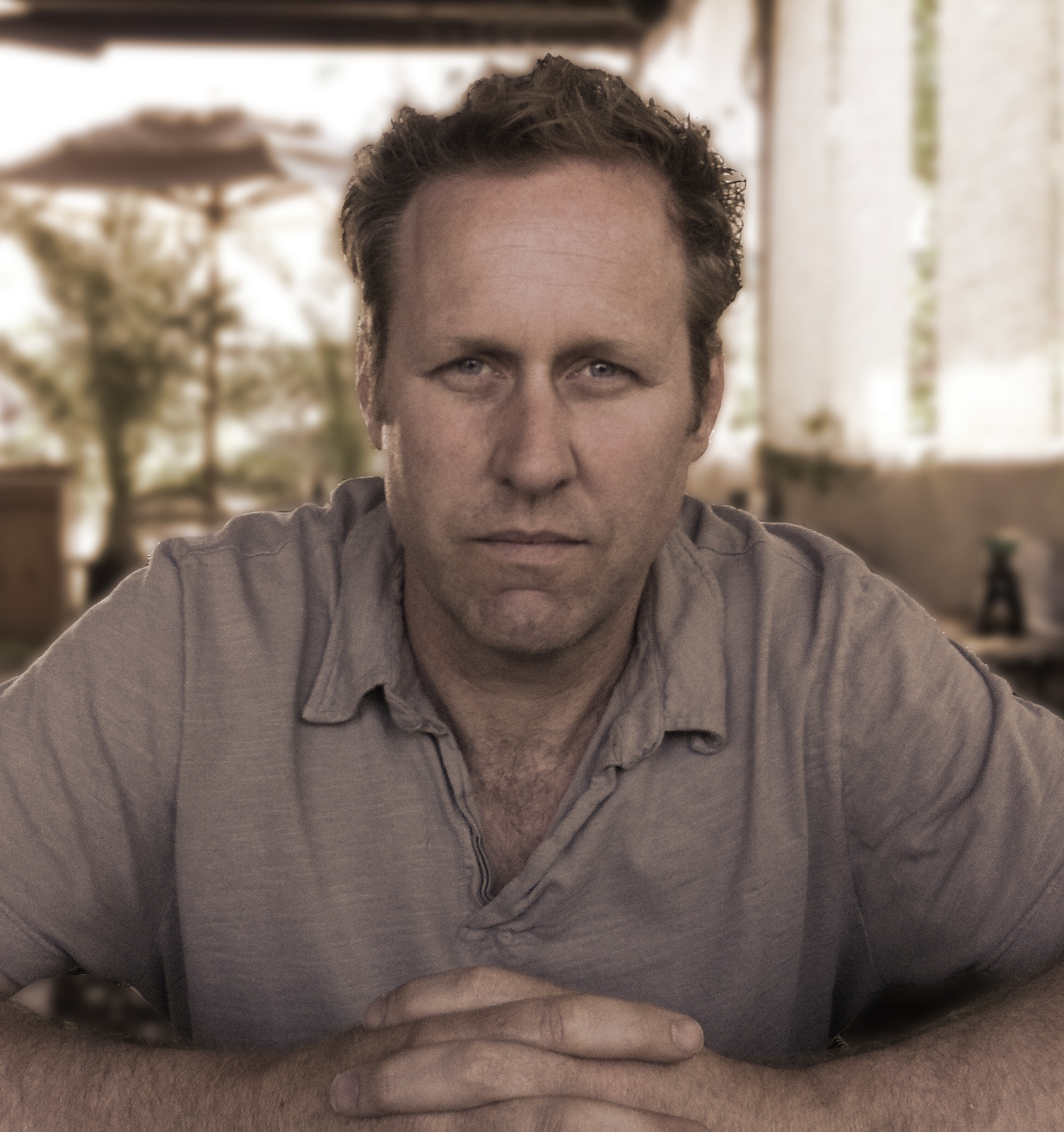
- Avary in 2012
- Born: Roger Roberts Avary; August 23, 1965 (age 61); Flin Flon, Manitoba, Canada
- Citizenship: Canadian; American
- Occupations: Director; screenwriter; producer
- Years active: 1983–present

Roger Roberts Avary (born August 23, 1965) is a Canadian-American film director, screenwriter, and producer. He is best known for his work with Quentin Tarantino on the script for Pulp Fiction (1994), for which they won Best Original Screenplay at the 67th Academy Awards. Avary has also directed films such as Killing Zoe (1993) and The Rules of Attraction (2002), and wrote the screenplays for Silent Hill (2006) and Beowulf (2007).

In 2022, Avary reunited with Tarantino to launch a podcast called The Video Archives Podcast.

== Early life ==
Roger Roberts Avary was born in Flin Flon, Manitoba, in Canada on August 23, 1965, to a Brazilian-raised father, who worked as a mining engineer, and a German mother, who worked as a physical therapist. They moved to Oracle, Arizona, and later Torrance, California, before settling in Manhattan Beach.

== Career ==
=== 1990s ===
In 1993, Avary directed his feature film debut with Killing Zoe. The film follows an American safe-cracker (Eric Stoltz) who travels to Paris to aid a childhood friend (Jean-Hugues Anglade) with a bank heist. Along the way he meets and befriends a sex worker (Julie Delpy) whose fate becomes tied with the crime. The film premiered at the 1994 Sundance Film Festival and went on to win the Grand Prize award at the 5th Yubari International Fantastic Film Festival.

Avary and Quentin Tarantino worked on the 1994 film Pulp Fiction, for which they won the Academy Award for Best Original Screenplay. According to Tarantino, Avary originally came up with the plot of the boxer Butch Coolidge and his gold watch from a screenplay named Pandemonium Reigns, which Avary had written himself.

In 1995, Avary wrote and directed the science fiction film Mr. Stitch for Syfy, then The Sci-Fi Channel. Loosely a modern take on Frankenstein, the film features Wil Wheaton, Rutger Hauer, Nia Peeples, and Ron Perlman.

=== 2000s ===
In 2002, Avary directed the film adaptation for The Rules of Attraction, based on Bret Easton Ellis' novel, which he also executive produced. The Rules of Attraction was the first studio film to be edited on Apple's Final Cut Pro editing system. Avary became a spokesperson for Final Cut Pro product, appearing in Apple print and web ads worldwide. In 2005, Avary, at the request of his friend, actor James Van Der Beek, who starred in The Rules of Attraction, played the part of a peyote-taking gonzo film director Franklin Brauner in the film Standing Still. Avary went on to finish the film Glitterati in 2004 which stars Kip Pardue and was assembled using footage taken from the European segment of The Rules of Attraction in 2001. It has never been released because of legal and ethical concerns.

In 2006, Avary wrote a screenplay adaptation to the Konami video game, Silent Hill (2006), with French director and friend, Christophe Gans, and Killing Zoe producer Samuel Hadida. Avary and Gans being long time gamers and fans of the Silent Hill series, collaborated on the film. Avary and novelist Neil Gaiman wrote the screenplay for the 2007 film Beowulf which was directed by Robert Zemeckis.

=== 2010s and 2020s ===
In September 2017, Avary directed his own screenplay, Lucky Day, a semi-sequel of Killing Zoe. Also in 2017, he shot an adaptation of Jean Cocteau's play La voix humaine that did not screen until it debuted on streaming in 2026.

After Pulp Fiction, Avary had a falling-out with Tarantino that lasted nearly twenty-five years. The two rekindled their friendship after Tarantino heard Avary being interviewed on a 2019 episode of Bret Easton Ellis's podcast. In 2021, Quentin Tarantino announced that he and Avary would launch a podcast titled The Video Archives Podcast. The point of the podcast is to discuss films from the actual Video Archives collection that they would recommend to customers when they worked there. The set is surrounded by actual VHS copies of films from Video Archives that Tarantino bought after the store went out of business. They are joined by podcast announcer, Gala Avary, Roger Avary's daughter. The first episode premiered on July 19, 2022. The duo discussed John Carpenter's Dark Star (1974) and Ulli Lommel's Cocaine Cowboys (1979).

In 2025, Avary created General Cinema Dynamics to develop artificial intelligence-produced films. By February 2026, Avery began active production on three AI-produced films: a Christmas movie set to debut in Winter 2026, a faith-based feature for Easter 2027, and a "big romantic war epic".

=== Unproduced works ===
After winning an Oscar for Pulp Fiction, he was originally attached to direct an adaptation of Neil Gaiman's comic book The Sandman, which merged the "Preludes and Nocturnes" storyline with that of "The Doll's House". Avary was fired after disagreements over the creative direction with executive producer Jon Peters. It was due to their meeting on the Sandman film project that Avary and Gaiman collaborated on the script for Beowulf. Avary had originally intended upon directing his script of Beowulf himself as a live action film, to be shot in Iceland with a $10 million budget. "I wanted it to be like an early Terry Gilliam film, like Jabberwocky," he said. The film was ultimately directed by Robert Zemeckis and instead produced using motion capture technology.

In the late 1990s, Avary reached out to Don Coscarelli and expressed an interest in writing a Phantasm sequel. Entitled Phantasm 1999, the film would have taken place in an apocalyptic future United States divided into three zones: Los Angeles, California; New York, New York; and the Plague Zone. The Plague Zone would be controlled by the Tall Man where he infects people with his "bag plague". Reggie must lead a secret government operation, called the "S Squad", into the Plague Zone to defeat the Tall Man. Avary and Coscarelli spent years trying to get the film made and even had financing in place in 1997 before that company changed hands and the deal evaporated. Eventually, Coscarelli made Phantasm IV without Avary, although as of 2022 Coscarelli still had interest in filming Avary's script, now entitled Phantasm's End as 1999 has come and gone.

Through the 1990s and early 2000s, Avary attempted to direct a film based on the life of Salvador Dalí that had Al Pacino attached to star as the painter at one stage, but the project fell apart and never came to fruition.

After The Rules of Attraction and Glitterati, Avary had intentions to film his screenplay of Bret Easton Ellis's 1998 novel Glamorama. Kip Pardue was attached to reprise his role as Victor Ward. The project never moved beyond the pre-production stage. When asked about the film's status in a 2010 interview, Ellis said: "I think the days of being able to make that movie are over." However, the following year Ellis confirmed that Avary was planning to shoot the feature in 2012.

In 2006, French director Alexandre Aja was set to direct a feature film adaptation of the Black Hole comics, with Neil Gaiman and Avary attached to adapt the screenplay. By 2008, it was reported by MTV that Gaiman and Avary had left the production and that their script would not be used for David Fincher's planned version, which was ultimately not produced. He was also attached to write and direct a Castle Wolfenstein film adaptation both in 2007 and 2012.

In 2006, Avary was set to write the script for a sequel to his film Silent Hill (2006). However, in November 2010, Avary would exit the film due to his vehicular manslaughter incident.

While in prison, Avary came across an "old Penguin paperback" on a book cart of a Robin Hood story written by E. Charles Vivian and decided to adapt the material, sending the pages he wrote to his lawyer to have his daughter type up into a script. "I was crying when I wrote it," Avary noted. "When you're writing like that and you're feeling that much, it's not a bad thing."

Following his prison sentence, Avary had worked on adapting Paul Verhoeven's book Jesus of Nazareth for Verhoeven to direct, oversaw rewrites on the screenplay for a planned Duncan Jones-directed biopic on James Bond creator Ian Fleming, and additionally had plans to adapt the early William Faulkner novel Sanctuary. Also in 2012, Avary was planning to reteam with author Bret Easton Ellis to direct an adaptation of his novel Lunar Park, with financing from Wild Bunch. Ellis himself took to Twitter in 2011, praising Avary's script as "great" and saying he "hopes he makes it." Also according to Ellis, Avary planned to shoot the project in September 2012, and hinted about Aaron Eckhart's potential involvement. In May 2014, Avary was writing a TV series adaptation of The Rules of Attraction for Bravo and Lionsgate Television.

At some point after John Milius' stroke, Avary, along with his daughter Gala, worked with Milius to retool his unproduced feature script on Genghis Khan in the form of a limited-run series. As of 2018, Avary was slated to direct Unwind, co-written with his daughter Gala and based on the dystopian novel of the same name. Avary has also written an as-yet unproduced script based on The Devil Soldier by Caleb Carr, which was in development with Antoine Fuqua directing and Mark Burman producing.

== Imprisonment ==
On January 13, 2008, Avary was arrested under suspicion of manslaughter and DUI, following a car crash in Ojai, California, in which his passenger, Andreas Zini, was killed. The Ventura County Sheriff's department responded to the crash after midnight Sunday morning on the 1900 block of East Ojai Avenue. Avary was released from jail on $50,000 bail. In December 2008, he was charged with, and pleaded not guilty to, gross vehicular manslaughter and two felony counts of causing bodily injury while intoxicated. He changed his plea to guilty on August 18, 2009. On September 29, 2009, he was sentenced to one year in work furlough (allowing him to go to his job during the day and then report back to the furlough facility at night) and five years of probation. However, after making several tweets about the conditions of his stay on Twitter, Avary was sent to Ventura County Jail to serve out the remainder of his term.

== Filmography ==
=== Feature films ===
| Year | Title | Functioned as | | | Notes |
| Year | Title | Director | Writer | Producer | Notes |
|---|---|---|---|---|---|
| 1993 | Killing Zoe | Yes | Yes | No | |
| 1994 | Pulp Fiction | No | Story | No | |
| 1995 | Mr. Stitch | Yes | Yes | Executive | |
| 2002 | The Rules of Attraction | Yes | Yes | Executive | |
| 2006 | Silent Hill | No | Yes | No | |
| 2007 | Beowulf | No | Yes | Executive | |
| 2019 | Lucky Day | Yes | Yes | No | |
| 2026 | La voix humaine | Yes | No | No | |
| N/A | Glitterati | Yes | Yes | Yes | Unreleased; Also editor and cinematographer |

==== Executive producer only ====
| Year | Title | Director | Notes |
|---|---|---|---|
| 1998 | Boogie Boy | Craig Hamann | |
| 2002 | The Last Man | Harry Ralston | |

==== Uncredited writing contributions ====
| Year | Title | Director | Notes |
|---|---|---|---|
| 1992 | Reservoir Dogs | Quentin Tarantino | |
| 1993 | True Romance | Tony Scott | |
| 1995 | Crying Freeman | Christophe Gans | |

==== Other production credits ====
| Year | Title | Role | Notes |
|---|---|---|---|
| 1987 | Maximum Potential | Production assistant | |
| 1987 | My Best Friend's Birthday | Cinematographer | Unfinished |
| 2006 | 36 Steps | Spiritual support | |

=== Short film ===
| Year | Title | Functioned as | | | Notes |
| Year | Title | Director | Writer | Producer | Notes |
|---|---|---|---|---|---|
| 1983 | The Worm Turns | Yes | Yes | Yes | |
| 1983 | The Boys | No | No | Yes | Also cinematographer |

=== Television ===
| Year | Title | Functioned as | | Notes |
| Year | Title | Writer | Producer | Notes |
|---|---|---|---|---|
| 1997 | Odd Jobs | Yes | Yes | Unaired pilot |
| 2012 | XIII: The Series | Yes | Executive | 13 episodes |

== Awards and nominations ==
| Institution | Year | Category | Title | Result |
|---|---|---|---|---|
| Yubari International Fantastic Film Festival | 1993 | Grand Prize | Killing Zoe | Won |
| Academy Awards | 1994 | Best Original Screenplay | Pulp Fiction | Won |
| BAFTA Awards | 1994 | Best Original Screenplay | Pulp Fiction | Won |
