= Honey Lauren =

American actress

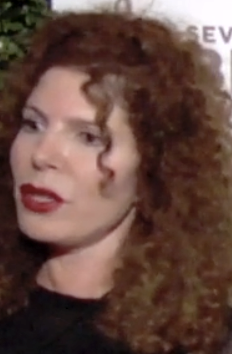
- Lauren in 2014
- Born: Los Angeles, California, U.S.
- Occupations: Actress; screenwriter; film director
- Years active: 1976–present
- Known for: Men Cry Bullets; Satan Was a Lady; Sweet Taste of Souls; Wives of the Skies
- Notable credits: Bram Stoker's Dracula; The Hidden II; June and John
- Website: honeylauren.net

Honey Lauren is an American actress, screenwriter and film director who appeared in the films Men Cry Bullets (1999), Satan Was a Lady (2001), June and John (2025), and Sweet Taste of Souls (2020).

== Career ==
In 1999, Lauren starred alongside Adrienne Frantz, James Russo, and Robert Gossett in Frantz's debut film Jimmy Zip. That same year, she co-starred with Jeri Ryan, portraying Gloria in Men Cry Bullets.

In 2001, Lauren starred in Satan Was a Lady by Doris Wishman, attending a screening with Wishman in early 2002. Her performance as Cleo was praised by Joe Bob Briggs and Film Threat.

In 2014, Lauren directed a documentary Happy Hands with Tippi Hedren which won Best Documentary Short at Sonoma International Film Festival.

In 2020, Lauren starred in Sweet Taste of Souls by Terry Ross. Her short film Wives of the Skies is set in the 1960s, and based on the male obsession with stewardess outfits during that era. Lauren's upcoming films include her directorial debut feature film Mistake with Kay Lenz and she was cast in the film June and John by Luc Besson.

== Filmography ==
Year	Title	Role	Director	Writer	Notes
2011	Dot Got Shot	Dot	Yes	Yes	Short film
2014	Happy Hands	—	Yes	Yes	Short documentary film
2020	Wives of the Skies	—	Yes	Yes	Short film
TBA	Mistake	Aunt Peg	Yes	Yes	Debut feature

=== Acting roles in other films ===
Year	Title	Role	Notes
1992	Bram Stoker's Dracula	Peep Show Girl	
1993	The Hidden II	Rave Girl	
1999	Jimmy Zip	Hooker	
1999	Men Cry Bullets	Gloria	
2001	Satan Was a Lady	Cleo	
2020	Sweet Taste of Souls	Ellinore	
2025	June and John	John's Mom	
