= David Arnott =

American actor and screenwriter

- Born: 1963 (age 62–63); California, United States
- Occupations: Actor, screenwriter, musical composer

David Arnott (born 1963) is an American actor, screenwriter, and musical composer living in Southern California. Among his credits, Arnott co-wrote Last Action Hero, and starred in The Last Man with Jeri Ryan. David is a member of the legendary "Pad O' Guys" screenwriting group, including Shane Black and Fred Dekker, and is the son of banjo player Peter R. Arnott. He also provided additional voices in Happy Feet Two and Finding Dory.

Arnott also appeared as "Cal Evans" in the 1995 UPN sitcom Pig Sty. He also appeared in a 1992 television remake of the classic film, Christmas in Connecticut directed by Arnold Schwarzenegger. This gives Arnott the probably unique distinction of both having written for, and having been directed by Schwarzenegger.

David is also a board game enthusiast, and can be seen on GameNight!, a YouTube web series in which he and 2-4 other participants play different designer board games.

== Partial filmography ==
- Amazing Stories (1986) (Umpire) (Magic Saturday)
- You Again? (1986) (Dirk) (Sports Fantasy)
- House II: The Second Story (1987) (Banana)
- The Facts of Life (1987) (Nick Drexler) (Rumor Has It)
- Three Fugitives (1989) (Bank teller)
- Day by Day (1989) (Fantasy David Gannon) (The Reunion)
- Freddy's Nightmares (1989) (Michael Bowman) (1 episode)
- CBS Summer Playhouse (1989) (Kevin Nesbite) (B-Men)
- Shannon's Deal (1990) (Bushman) (Hitting Home)
- The Adventures of Ford Fairlane (1990) (Club Guy)
- Doctor Doctor (1990) (Ken the Usher) (1 episode)
- Career Opportunities (1991) (Voiceover)
- Timebomb (1991) (Stan)
- Christmas in Connecticut (Crazed Director)
- Mad About You (1992) (Lester) (Met Someone)
- The Young Indiana Jones Chronicles (1993) (Clifford) (1 episode)
- The Second Half (1993) (Ed) (1 episode)
- Little Big League (1994) (Little League Manager)
- Murphy Brown (1995) (Secretary 78) (1 episode)
- The Spooktacular New Adventures of Casper (Voice) (1997) (1 episode)
- Code Name Phoenix (Sasha) (2000)
- Final Fantasy: The Spirits Within (2001) (Additional voices)
- Final Fantasy X (2001) (Additional voices)
- Imagine That (2002) (Dr. Testosterone) (The Macho Therapist)
- The Last Man (2002) (Alan)
- ER (2006) (Clivus) (Graduation Day)
- Happy Feet Two (2011) (Additional Voices)
- Good Luck Charlie (2010-12) (Mitch) (3 episodes)
- Finding Dory (2016) (Additional voices)
- Sing (Additional voices)
- Lucha Underground (2017-18) (Benjamin Cook) (3 episodes)
- Wish Dragon (2021) (Additional voices)
