= Mason Gooding =

American actor (born 1996)

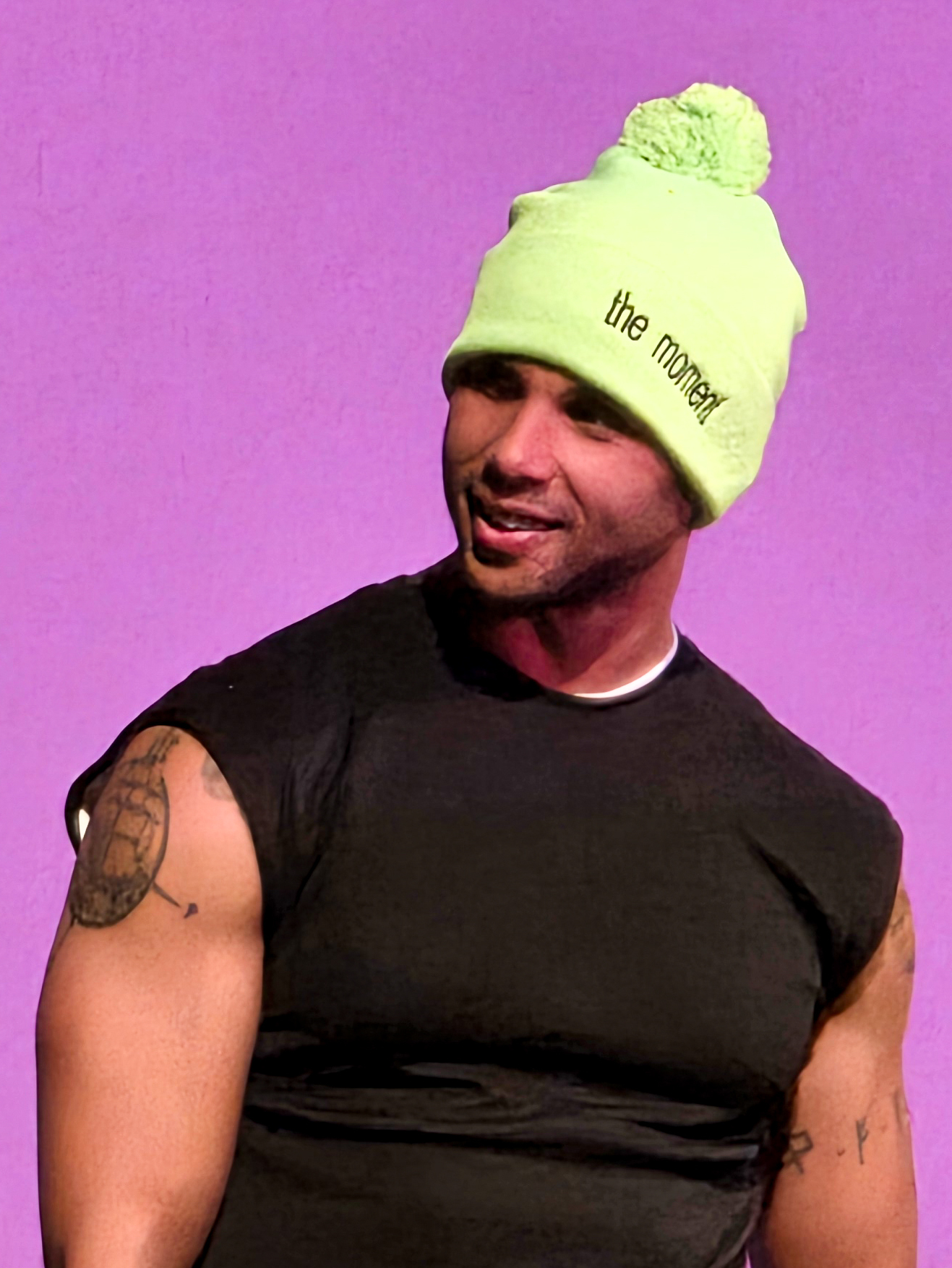
- Gooding at the 2026 Sundance Film Festival
- Born: Mason Cuba Gooding; November 14, 1996 (age 30); Los Angeles, California, U.S.
- Occupation: Actor
- Years active: 2016–present
- Parents: Cuba Gooding Jr. (father); Sara Kapfer (mother)
- Relatives: Cuba Gooding Sr. (grandfather); Omar Gooding (uncle)

Mason Cuba Gooding (born November 14, 1996) is an American actor. The son of Academy Award winning actor Cuba Gooding Jr., he has appeared in television series and films, known for his roles in horror. He had a recurring role in the HBO television series Ballers (2018) and a starring role in Love, Victor, a teen drama series on Hulu (2020–2022).

He has appeared in the films Booksmart (2019) and Fall (2022), and portrayed Chad Meeks-Martin in Scream (2022), Scream VI (2023), and Scream 7 (2026). He also starred in Heart Eyes (2025).

== Early life ==
Gooding was born on November 14, 1996 in Los Angeles to Sara Kapfer and actor Cuba Gooding Jr. He is the middle of three children. His paternal grandfather was Cuba Gooding Sr., the former lead singer of R&B band, The Main Ingredient, and his uncle is actor Omar Gooding. His paternal great-grandfather immigrated to the United States from Barbados.

Mason Gooding attended Windward School in Mar Vista, Los Angeles, where he played varsity football for four years. He graduated in 2015. During high school, his main interests were football and theater. In an appearance on Live with Kelly and Mark on August 4, 2026, Gooding talked about being 300 pounds and playing every offensive line position. After an ACL injury while playing on defense, he was told "football's probably not for you... Is there anything else that you're passionate about, that excites you?" He wanted to begin acting after graduation, but decided to attend college after visiting his father on set in New York. He enrolled in New York University Tisch School of the Arts in Manhattan to study dramatic writing and psychology. He dropped out during his junior year in order to pursue acting full time.

== Career ==
In 2017, while still in college, Gooding found a manager and an agent and began booking roles. While at N.Y.U., he was a PA and a featured background player on the web series Spring Street. He booked his first major acting role in the dramedy Ballers on HBO alongside Dwayne Johnson. In 2018, Gooding played his first major film role in Booksmart, directed by Olivia Wilde in her directorial debut. In 2019, he was cast as Andrew in Love, Victor, the television spinoff of the 2018 film Love, Simon. Originally developed for Disney+, the series premiered in 2020. While he had played football in high school, he had to learn how to play basketball for the role. Gooding appeared in Let It Snow, a Christmas-themed romantic comedy on Netflix later in 2020.

In 2020, he also began appearing in Freeform's sitcom Everything's Gonna Be Okay. In September 2020, Gooding was cast as Chad Meeks-Martin in the fifth Scream film, which was directed by Matt Bettinelli-Olpin and Tyler Gillett. Delayed by the COVID-19 pandemic, the film was released on January 14, 2022. In late August 2021, Gooding co-starred alongside Kesha and Chloe Bailey in the scripted podcast Electric Easy, a musical neo-noir science fiction show set in futuristic Los Angeles. Humans struggle to co-exist with robots, known as “electrics”. The show was created by Vanya Asher and executive produced by Kesha. The podcast premiered on August 30, 2021. Gooding reprised his role of Meeks-Martin in the film Scream VI, released on March 10, 2023. He portrayed the character again in Scream 7.

== Filmography ==
=== Film ===
Key
†	Denotes productions that have not yet been released

Year	Title	Role	Notes	Ref.
2016	Godspeed	Johnny	Short film	
2018	When Don Met Vicky	Don	Short film	
2019	Booksmart	Nick Howland		
2019	Don't Say No	Brandon	Short film	
2019	Let It Snow	Jeb		
2020	Violent Nights	Rick	Short film	
2022	Scream	Chad Meeks-Martin		
2022	I Want You Back	Paul		
2022	Moonshot	Calvin Riggs		
2022	Alone Together with You	Harry	Short film; also director	
2022	Fall	Dan Connor		
2023	Scream VI	Chad Meeks-Martin		
2024	Y2K	Jonas		
2024	Adult Best Friends	John		
2024	Aftermath	Jimmy "Romeo" Roken		
2025	Heart Eyes	Jay Simmonds		
2025	Pools	Reed		
2025	Under Fire	DEA Agent Abbott		
2026	I Want Your Sex	Zap		
2026	Scream 7	Chad Meeks-Martin		
2026	The Gates	Derek		
2026	72 Hours	Mason		
2027	Crawl 2 †	TBA	Filming	
2028	Heart Eyes 2 †	Jay Simmonds	Pre-production	

=== Television ===
Year	Title	Role	Notes	Ref.
2017	Spring Street	Opera house bartender	Episode: "Whatever You Did, It's in the Past."	
2018	Ballers	Parker Jones	Recurring role; 3 episodes (season 4)	
2018	The Good Doctor	Billy Cayman	Episode: "Empathy"	
2020	Everything's Gonna Be Okay	Luke	Recurring role; 4 episodes (season 1)	
2020	Star Trek: Picard	Gabriel Hwang	Episode: "Stardust City Rag"	
2020–2022	Love, Victor	Andrew Spencer	Main role; 28 episodes	
2022	How I Met Your Father	Ash	Episode: "The Good Mom"	
2024	The Kill Count	Dealer	Episode: "V/H/S/2 (2013) KILL COUNT"	

=== Podcasts ===
Year	Title	Role	Notes	Ref.
2021	Electric Easy	Lucky	10 episodes	

=== Music videos ===
Year	Title	Artist	Ref.
2025	"When I'm with You"	Lisa featuring Tyla	
