= Glitterati (film) =

- Directed by: Roger Avary
- Screenplay by: Roger Avary; Kip Pardue
- Based on: Characters by Bret Easton Ellis
- Starring: Kip Pardue
- Country: United States
- Language: English

Glitterati is an American film directed by Roger Avary. Filmed in 2001, it remains unreleased due to various legal, ethical, and music licensing concerns.

Glitterati stars Kip Pardue as Victor Ward, a shallow and narcissistic aspiring model, as he travels around Europe and becomes implicated in a terrorist plot.

The film was assembled from 70 hours of video footage shot for the European sequence of The Rules of Attraction.

The film was intended as a connecting bridge between The Rules of Attraction and a planned film adaptation of Bret Easton Ellis's 1998 novel Glamorama, which was to be directed by Avary and star Pardue. Avary has described Glitterati a "pencil sketch of what will ultimately be the oil painting of Glamorama."

== Plot ==
Victor Ward is in Europe in order to "take a whack at the whole modelling, European, figure-it-out kind of thing".

The film uses song lyrics to tell the story of how Victor Ward becomes involved with a Florence bombing and then plans a second bombing in Rome, after sightseeing the ruins of the Colosseum and the Vatican.

== Production ==
Filming took place over two weeks, beginning in London, and followed by Amsterdam, Paris, Barcelona, Cadaqués, Munich, Zermatt, Florence, Venice, and Rome.

Roger Avary instructed Kip Pardue to remain in character as Victor Ward for the entire duration of filming. Avary followed Pardue with a PAL Sony PD-150, and Greg Shapiro, the producer. Pardue would interact with members of the public, and Shapiro would later ask them to sign release forms.

== Release ==
Avary described the film as "ethically questionable" and stated that he has no intention to release it on DVD, but only to show it privately in "sporadic surprise screenings". Bret Easton Ellis said of the film that "for many legal reasons, it will never see the light of day" as it's "basically about 90 minutes of [Pardue] actually in character seducing women throughout Europe."
