= Spring Street (web series) =

LGBT web series

Spring Street is an American LGBT web series created by David Beck. The series was a production of The Great Griffon, Beck's non-profit LGBT film company dedicated to "telling tales of the underdog". In addition to Beck, the series stars Alanna Blair, Giordan Diaz, Kate Hodge, Luis Villalobos, Michael Earle-Fajardo, Rosina Fernhoff, and Jennifer Bobbi. It also marks an early role for Mason Gooding as the Bartender at the opera in the final episode of Season One. Dealing with the themes of loss, betrayal, addiction, and the healing power of music, the series focuses on Mr. Christopher, a reclusive piano teacher (played by Beck), his pregnant sister recovering from a heroin addiction (Blair), and a mysterious new student who may or may not have ties to their grandmother's death (Diaz). The first season was released on YouTube in nine episodes between March and May 2017. On March 15, 2017, Zach Stafford of OUT Magazine featured an exclusive sneak peek of Spring Street before its premiere.

== Production ==
The successful Kickstarter campaign was endorsed by The HuffPost, who quoted Beck: "This is not an LGBTQ story; this is a human story." Internationally recognized drag queen Manila Luzon also championed the web series. Production for the eighty-eight minute web series took place over nine days throughout New York, including one overnight on the subway. Fashion designer Viktor Luna was hired as a key set dresser in addition to designing the red gown for Rosina Fernhoff in the pivotal episode six on the New York subway. Greek queer filmmaker Natalia Bougadellis co-directed alongside Beck, in addition to creating the cinematography and acting as producer. Iorgo Papoutsas and editor Susan Hunt were also on board as producers.

== Cast ==
- David Beck as Christopher O'Brien
- Giordan Diaz as Ricardo
- Alanna Blair as Anna O'Brien
- Michael Earle Fajardo as Manny
- Luis Villalobos as Sergio
- Nairoby Otero as Elena
- Rosina Fernhoff as Maggie "Grammy" O'Brien
- Jennifer Bobbi as Betty
- Rosemarie Mitchell as Lena
- Sarah Jun as Cindy
- Kenny Chin as Pete
- Toni Murray as Lucy
- Dolly Mariah as Yara
- Mariana Parma as Marta
- Phoenix Williams as Clayton Davies
- Kate Hodge as Mrs. Davies
- Gloria Makino as Opera Singer
- Elliot Fishman as Young Christopher
- Gary Roth as Old Man in Dream
- Colin Buckingham as Violinist on Street
- Aaron Kelly as Gay Piano Bar Patron / Streetwalker in Drag
- Thomas M. Harland as Gay Piano Bar Patron / Opera Patron
- Iorgo Papoutsas as AA Chairperson
- Robert Arteca as AA Meeting Attendee / Gay Piano Bar Patron
- Anand Dharawat as AA Meeting Attendee
- Claudia Fanaro as AA Meeting Attendee
- Jose Carlos Goma as AA Meeting Attendee
- Candice Opperman as AA Meeting Attendee
- Sam Smith as AA Meeting Attendee
- Anthony Wills Jr. as Jammal / Cabaret Pianist
- Aaron Kelly as Streetwalker in Drag / Gay Piano Bar Patron
- Aunt Barbara (Jennifer Bobbi) as Drag Queen
- Jorge Gigi Cutina Flores as Drag Queen
- Hector Simone Xtravaganza as Drag Queen
- Roberto Mejia as Topless Waiter
- Robert Benge as Gay Piano Bar Patron
- McCailey Contreras as Gay Piano Bar Patron
- Tad Greene as Gay Piano Bar Patron
- Elijah Krenik as Gay Piano Bar Patron
- Jim Quinlivan as Gay Piano Bar Patron
- Daniel Silvestre as Gay Piano Bar Patron
- Mary-Anne Brady Bennett as Opera Patron
- Marko Caka as Opera Patron
- Mason Gooding as Opera House Bartender
- Viktor Luna as Opera Patron (cameo)
- Louis Herrera as Opera Patron
- Barry Liebman as Opera Patron
- Robin Westle as Opera Patron
- Daddy Tom as Guy in Bar
- Daisy Park as Eila /
- Iris and Auden Park as Family in the Park

== Music ==
The music, mainly composed and performed by Beck, who is a professional pianist, is inspired by classical music, including Chopin, Mozart, and Dvorak. Luis Villalobos, acclaimed violinist of the Villalobos Brothers, also contributed to the score. Singer-songwriter Meg Cavanaugh covered the jazz standard "How About You" for the teaser. Cavanaugh also contributed her original songs "Pinafore" and "Waltz" to the soundtrack, which also includes "Sons and Daughters" by Radiant Reveries.

== Awards and nominations ==
Spring Street was nominated as Best Indie Web Series at the 7th Streamy Awards. It was also nominated as Best Web Series by the International Online Web Fest. In addition, Beck was honored with a nomination by IOWB for Best Screenplay. Spring Street was selected as Project of the Day by Indiewire, and subsequently was voted as Indiewire's Project of the Week. In reviewing Season One, Sam Gutelle of Tubefilter writes: "Spring Street is here, and it is an eye-catching, complex show driven by its patient cinematography and round characters...Spring Street is a steadily paced, thoughtful show, and diving into it requires careful attention, but it rewards faithful viewers with a well-composed, artful experience. In other words, the show is a lot like the classical music it uses as its soundtrack: Give it time to piece itself together, and it will impress you."
