= Kate Hodge =

American actress and film producer (born 1966)

- Occupations: Actress; film producer
- Years active: 1986–present
- Known for: Rapid Fire

Kate Hodge is an American actress and film producer.

== Career ==
Her first starring role was as Michelle, the heroine of the 1990 horror film Leatherface: The Texas Chainsaw Massacre III. She then portrayed tormented college student Randi Wallace in the syndicated horror series She-Wolf of London (1990–1991), which was later retitled Love and Curses. At the end of one early episode, when Randi and Professor Matheson (Neil Dickson) are pulling away in a car, she asks him if they can stop to rent Leatherface: Texas Chainsaw Massacre III, an in-joke and reference to Hodge's earlier movie role.

From 2000–2001, Hodge played FBI Agent Annie Price on Level 9. She has also been in the films Rapid Fire (1992) opposite Brandon Lee, Desire (1993), The Hidden II (1994), Three Women of Pain (1997), and the independent movie I Will Avenge You, Iago! (2005) as Eve. Her television movies include Love Kills (1991), Pandora's Clock (1996), and Enough About Me (2005).

She has made appearances in several television series, including thirtysomething (1989), Tales from the Crypt (1990), Ellen (1994–1995), Cupid (1998), and Summerland.

Hodge portrayed Libby Schuster in The George Wendt Show (1995) and Gretchen Lafayette in The Louie Show (1996). She was also seen in Manhattan, AZ (2000) as Jane Pentowski. She was a series regular for ten episodes of the Fred Savage show Working (1998). Her character, Chris Grant, was originally introduced as a woman pretending to be a man in order to gain respect in the business world. She acted in the first episode of the Streamy nominated LGBTQ web series Spring Street (2017) and as Harris Dickinson's mother in the film Beach Rats.

In addition to acting, Hodge has also produced two films, The Perfect Stranger (2005) and Black Velvet Pantsuit (1995), where she served as co-executive producer.

== Filmography ==
=== Film ===
Year	Title	Role	Notes
1986	Super Christian II	Cindy	Video short
1990	Leatherface: The Texas Chainsaw Massacre III	Michelle	
1992	Rapid Fire	Karla Withers	
1993	Desire	Lauren Allen	
1993	The Hidden II	Juliet Beck	Video
1997	Three Women of Pain	Mary Ann	Short film
2005	I Will Avenge You, Iago!	Eve	
2007	Finding Oz: A Journey Home	Tin Woman	Short film
2008	Harold	Dusty	
2011	Rules of Love	Michelle	Short film
2012	American Girl	Mother	Short film
2014	Mount Joy	MILF	
2014	The Ones That Have Fallen	Lou	
2015	Completely Normal	Dr Hunter	
2017	Beach Rats	Donna	
2022	Beyond the Resonator	Julia	
2022	Curse of the Re-Animator	Julia	
2022	The Headless Horseman	Moria	
2023	The Exorcists	Reverend Melody Bates	
2024	War of the Worlds: Extinction	Sybil Alfaro	
	Mr. Wonderful	Corinne Fenton	

=== Television ===
Year	Title	Role	Notes
1989	Thirtysomething	Hope at 17	Episode: "The Burning Bush"
1990	Tales from the Crypt	Sally	Episode: "Dead Right"
1990–1991	She-Wolf of London	Randi Wallace	Regular role (20 episodes)
1991	Love Kills	Jill Shanahan	TV film
1992	Mann & Machine	Adrianne	Episode: "The Dating Game"
1993	Jack's Place	Kathleen O'Brien	Episode: "The Pipes Are Calling"
1993–1994	Silk Stalkings	Paige Hamilton	4 episodes
1994	Renegade	Lydia Quantro	Episode: "The Late Shift"
1994–1995	Silk Stalkings	Taylor	4 episodes
1994–1995	Ellen	Stephanie	3 episodes
1995	The George Wendt Show	Libby Schuster	Main role (8 episodes)
1995	Crowfoot	Rachel Stoltz	TV film
1995	Nowhere Man	Angie / Nancy	Episode: "The Spider Webb"
1995	Xena: Warrior Princess	Celesta	Episode: "Death in Chains"
1995	Simon		Episode: "Simon and the She-Devil"
1996	Bunk Bed Brothers	Jessie	TV film
1996	American Pie		Unknown episodes
1996	The Louie Show	Gretchen Lafayette	Main role (6 episodes)
1996	The Lazarus Man		Episode: "The Wallpaper Prison"
1996	Murder, She Wrote	Alana Kimball	Episode: "Race to Death"
1996	Doomsday Virus	Brenda Hopkins	TV film
1997	The Pretender	Carol Bates	Episode: "Mirage"
1997	The Sentinel	Tanya	Episode: "Secret"
1997	Players	Gayle	Episode: "Contact Sport"
1997	JAG	Ens. Elizabeth 'Beth' Lane	Episode: "Defenseless"
1998	The Tom Show	Jill	Episode: "Tom vs. the PTA"
1998	Working	Chris Grant / Ellen	Regular role (10 episodes)
1998	Cupid	Valerie	Episode: "A Truly Fractured Fairy Tale"
1998	Love Boat: The Next Wave	Ginger	Episode: "Affairs to Remember"
1998–1999	Brother's Keeper	Marilyn	4 episodes
1999	Movie Stars	Robyn Winslow	Episode: "Third Time's a Charm"
1999	Snoops	Linda Jennings	2 episodes
2000	Manhattan, AZ	Jane Pentowski	Recurring role (5 episodes)
2000–2001	Level 9	Annie Price	Main role (12 episodes)
2003	111 Gramercy Park	Mimi Philips	TV film
2003	Law & Order: Special Victims Unit	Carolyn Forbes	Episode: "Coerced"
2004	NCIS	NCIS Agent Jane Melankovic	Episode: "The Good Wives Club"
2005	Enough About Me	Paula Conine	TV film
2005	Jonny Zero	Sharon	Episode: "No Good Deed"
2007	Boston Legal	Kaye Kent	Episode: "Guise 'n Dolls"
2007	As the World Turns	Pam Dennison	Episode: "1.13065"
2007	Law & Order: Criminal Intent	Paula Rush	Episode: "Seeds"
2007	Law & Order	Attorney Prescott	Episode: "Remains of the Day"
2000—2008	Level 9	Annie Price	13 episodes
2008	Unhitched	Katherine	Episode: "Pilot"
2008	Fringe	Abby Stockton	Episode: "The Equation"
2009	Law & Order	Serena Kensey	Episode: "Shotgun"
2010	White Collar	Judge Michelle Clark	Episode: "Bad Judgment"
2010	Outlaw	Lois Vidalin	Episode: "In Re: Tracy Vidalin"
2011	In Between Men	Dr. Nicole Shaw	Episode: "Trouble in Paradise"
2011	One Life to Live	Ionia Masters	Recurring role (5 episodes)
2012	Person of Interest	Nicola Petrosian	Episode: "Baby Blue"
2012	Blue Bloods	Theresa Keenan	Episode: "Some Kind of Hero"
2013	The Following	Sharon Cooper	Episode: "Chapter Two"
2013	The Good Wife	Lila Ashbaugh	Episode: "The Decision Tree"
2014	Elementary	Karen Lutz	Episode: "Enough Nemesis to Go Around"
2015	Sex & Drugs & Rock & Roll	Micki	Episode: "Don't Wanna Die Anonymous"
2016	Chicago P.D.	Deborah Meyer	Episode: "In a Duffel Bag"
2017	Spring Street	Mrs. Davies	Episode: "It's Chopin. You Have to Sing It."
2019	The Resident	Lynette Hughes	Episode: "Out for Blood"
