= Sweet Taste of Souls =

2020 American film by Terry Ross

- Poster
- Directed by: Terry Ross
- Written by: F. Scott Mudgett
- Produced by: Lisa Bruhn; Kris Johnson; Bee Pedersen
- Starring: Honey Lauren; John Salandria; Mark Valeriano; Amber Gaston; Sarah J. Bartholomew; Thom Michael Mulligan; Frank Papia
- Cinematography: Oscar Velázquez
- Music by: Dennis Poore
- Production company: Flying Dolphin Productions
- Distributed by: TriCoast Entertainment
- Release date: November 1, 2020
- Running time: 99 minutes
- Country: United States
- Language: English

Sweet Taste of Souls is a 2020 American fantasy horror film directed by Terry Ross and written by F. Scott Mudgett. The film stars Honey Lauren, John Salandria, Mark Valeriano, Amber Gaston and Thom Michael Mulligan.

== Plot ==
When band members stop at a roadside cafe for a slice of pie, they find themselves locked up in the unstable cafe owners surreal art collection and must battle a menacing force with a taste for souls.

== Cast ==
- Honey Lauren as Ellinore
- John Salandria as Nate
- Mark Valeriano as Kyle
- Amber Gaston as Wendy
- Sarah J. Bartholomew as Lily
- Thom Michael Mulligan as Barney
- Frank Papia as Sid
- Jesse LeNoir as Tucker
- Darn Oldham as Raymond
- Scott Alin as Patrick

== Production ==
The film was produced by Flying Dolphin Productions. Principal photography took place in Julian, California and other locations in San Diego County over twenty six days.

== Release ==
The film screened at Cosmo Film Festival. It was released on November 1, 2020, and distributed by TriCoast Worldwide.

== Reception ==
Paul Chapinal at Film-news.co.uk scored it 3 out of 5, claiming it has "enough twists and turns to keep the attention." The Scariest Things scored it 3 out of 5, concluding it is "Delicious cherry pie." Horror Bound called it "a new unique tale in horror." In a review at PopHorror, Anthony Baamonde claims the "acting is fabulous, and Honey Lauren totally steals the show." In a less favorable review, Explosion Network scored it 4 out of 10 claiming that the "core concept is unique enough to carry the weaker parts of the film." Without Your Head scored the film 2 out of 5 stating the film had "great concepts that never get the execution they deserve." Film critic Jennie Kermode at Eye for Film scored in 1 out of 5, stating "you'll be left feeling as if you've been watching this picture for years."
