= Mr. Stitch =

- Directed by: Roger Avary
- Written by: Roger Avary
- Produced by: Roger Avary; Rutger Hauer; Morgan Mason
- Starring: Rutger Hauer; Wil Wheaton; Nia Peeples; Ron Perlman
- Cinematography: Tom Richmond
- Edited by: Sloane Klevin
- Music by: tomandandy
- Release date: 1995
- Country: United States
- Language: English

Mr. Stitch is a 1995 science fiction film written and directed by Roger Avary and starring Rutger Hauer, Wil Wheaton, Nia Peeples, and Ron Perlman.

== Plot ==
Dr. Rue Wakeman and his team create a creature, Subject 3, from the skin and organs of multiple men and women. The creature has no memories but understands speech and selects the male gender for himself. He regularly meets with Dr. Elizabeth English to discuss his dreams which seem to be memories from minds of the sources of his body parts. The creature requests the Bible and Frankenstein for reading material but is only provided the Bible at first, thereafter naming himself Lazarus. He is later also given a copy of Frankenstein which includes an inscription written to Dr. English for her 30th birthday from Dr. Texarian, the former head of the project who was also one of the sources of Lazarus's body parts.

Lazarus's distrust in Dr. Wakeman grows and he decides to escape from the facility where he is being held. He crawls through the ventilation shafts and overhears the doctors planning his termination in order to move ahead with the next stage of their research. He carjacks Dr. Jacobs and escapes from the security personnel in a car chase. He visits the home of Clay and Thorne, a father and son who were the source of some of his body parts, and tells their thoughts to the widow Sandy still living there. He then visits Dr. English and tells her the thoughts of Dr. Texarian. Lazarus returns to the facility and destroys the data being used to create Subject 4. He releases VX nerve gas in the room where Subject 4 is being held and kills General Hardcastle, the man running the project, as well as Subject 4 and himself as Dr. English watches from outside the room in tears. Dr. English leaves the facility and is later shown stitching together a new creature.

== Cast ==
- Rutger Hauer as Dr. Rue Wakeman
- Wil Wheaton as Lazarus
- Nia Peeples as Dr. Elizabeth English
- Ron Perlman as Dr. Frederick Texarian
- Taylor Negron as Dr. Al Jacobs
- Al Sapienza as Clay Gardener
- Luke Stratte-McClure as Thorn Gardener
- Valarie Trapp as Sandy Gardener
- Michael Harris as General Hardcastle
- Ron Jeremy as Lieutenant Periainkle
- Stevo Polyi as Stevo
- Rowland Wafford as Rowland
- Kario Salem as Ornery Policeman
- Tom Savini as Chemical Weapons Engineer

== See also ==
- Frankenstein in popular culture
