= Harry Ralston =

American film director

- Born: Harry Ralston
- Occupations: Screenwriter; Director; Producer

Harry Ralston is an American-born screenwriter, director, and producer.

== Biography ==
Born to a Jewish family, Ralston began his career working in advertising in New York and then as a journalist covering bullfights for the Mexico City News, after which he moved to Los Angeles and wrote and directed the 2000 film The Last Man with Jeri Ryan in her first starring role, and produced the 1999 Tamara Hernandez film Men Cry Bullets. Men Cry Bullets won SXSW and five other festivals and was released later that year. The Last Man won Best Film in the Festival of Fantastic Films in London as well as a Lumière Award in the New Orleans Film Festival. It was released by Lionsgate. He most recently co-wrote the MGM film Mexicali with Roger Avary, Cristian Gudegast & Paul Scheuring and Patrick Kelly.
