= The Hidden (1987 film) =

1987 film by Jack Sholder

- Theatrical release poster
- Directed by: Jack Sholder
- Written by: Jim Kouf (as Bob Hunt)
- Produced by: Michael L. Meltzer; Gerald T. Olson; Robert Shaye
- Starring: Michael Nouri; Kyle MacLachlan
- Cinematography: Jacques Haitkin
- Edited by: Michael N. Knue; Maureen O’Connell
- Music by: Michael Convertino
- Production companies: Heron Communications, Inc. Mega Entertainment
- Distributed by: New Line Cinema
- Release date: October 30, 1987
- Running time: 97 minutes
- Country: United States
- Language: English
- Budget: $4.5 million
- Box office: $9.7 million

The Hidden is a 1987 American science fiction action horror film directed by Jack Sholder, written by Jim Kouf (under the pseudonym Bob Hunt), and released by New Line Cinema. It stars Kyle MacLachlan and Michael Nouri, along with Clu Gulager, Chris Mulkey, Ed O'Ross, Clarence Felder, Claudia Christian and Larry Cedar. It received mostly positive reviews, and was followed by a 1993 sequel, The Hidden II, which was directed by Seth Pinsker.

== Plot ==
Jack DeVries, a quiet citizen with no criminal past, robs a Los Angeles Wells Fargo bank, kills all of the security guards inside, and leads the Los Angeles Police Department on a high-speed chase. The chase ends when DeVries encounters a police blockade overseen by Detective Thomas Beck. DeVries is shot several times, smashes through the blockade and crashes the Ferrari he is driving. DeVries is taken to a hospital, where a doctor informs Beck and his partner, Detective Cliff Willis, that DeVries is not expected to survive the night.

Upon his return to LAPD headquarters, Beck and his supervisor, Lieutenant John Masterson, meet FBI Special Agent Lloyd Gallagher, who informs them that Beck has been assigned to work with Gallagher to track down DeVries. When told of DeVries's condition, Gallagher rushes off to the hospital.

Meanwhile, at the hospital, DeVries suddenly awakens. Disconnecting his life-support equipment, he approaches the comatose man in the next bed, Jonathan P. Miller. After DeVries forces Miller's mouth open, a slug-like alien emerges from DeVries' mouth and transfers itself into Miller's body. Gallagher arrives to find DeVries dead on the floor and Miller's bed abandoned. Gallagher tells Beck to put out an alert on Miller, but Beck refuses, because Miller has no criminal record.

Miller goes to a record store where he beats the store's owner to death. He then goes to a car dealership, where he kills three men and steals a red Ferrari. He then visits a strip club, where the alien leaves Miller's body and takes over the body of a stripper named Brenda Lee Van Buren (Claudia Christian). Gallagher asks police to track Brenda when he sees her picture next to Miller's body. Brenda is then propositioned by a stranger; she accepts and follows him to his car. They proceed to have sex in his car which results in his death. She then takes his car. Gallagher and Beck pursue her to a rooftop, where they mortally wound her in a gun battle. Gallagher points a strangely-shaped alien weapon at Brenda, but she leaps from the roof. As Masterson arrives from his house to take charge of the scene, the alien transfers itself off camera from Brenda's dying body to Masterson's dog.

Frustrated by Gallagher's continuing refusal to explain the strange phenomenon of ordinary citizens turning into crazed killers, Beck arrests him and puts him in a jail cell. Beck soon learns that Gallagher is an imposter, impersonating the real agent Gallagher (who is deceased). When Beck confronts Gallagher with this information, Gallagher admits to being an extraterrestrial lawman and that they are in fact pursuing an alien thrill killer who has the ability to take over the bodies of anyone it wants. Beck dismisses the story as insane and leaves Gallagher in a jail cell at the police station.

Back at Masterson's house, the alien leaves the dog's body and enters Masterson. In the morning, Masterson goes to the police station and seizes a number of weapons, sparking a shootout between himself and the station's police officers as he attempts to track down Gallagher. Convinced of Gallagher's story due to Masterson's immunity to excessive bullet wounds, Beck releases him from jail, and the two confront Masterson. During the resulting shootout, Masterson confirms that Gallagher is an alien law enforcer named Alhague who has been pursuing the alien ever since it murdered his family and his partner on another planet. When Alhague first came to Earth, he inhabited the body of Robert Stone, a park ranger, while assuming the identity of Lloyd Gallagher after the real Gallagher was killed in a fire. Though Beck manages to stop Masterson, Alhague/Gallagher demonstrates that his weapon cannot kill the alien when it is still inside a human body, thus requiring him to be present while it is transferring hosts. They are unable to stop the alien from abandoning Masterson's body for that of Beck's partner Willis, who then escapes the station.

Using Willis' credentials, the alien attempts to gain access to Senator Holt, a likely presidential candidate. Alhague/Gallagher and Beck follow Willis, and a shootout ensues between Beck and Willis. Beck is severely wounded. As Willis, the alien corners Senator Holt and enters his body before Alhague/Gallagher can stop him. "Holt" then calls a press conference and announces his candidacy for the presidency. Alhague/Gallagher is forced to attack Holt in the middle of the press conference. Though shot several times by the police and the senator's bodyguards, Alhague/Gallagher is able to get close enough to use a flamethrower on Holt. The alien emerges from Holt's charred body, shocking everyone present. Alhague/Gallagher kills it with his alien weapon before collapsing.

Taken to the hospital where Beck is being treated, Alhague/Gallagher discovers that Beck is close to death. Witnessing the emotional suffering of Beck's wife and daughter, Alhague/Gallagher transfers his life force from Gallagher to Beck as Beck dies. When she sees her miraculously recovered father, Beck's daughter initially hesitates when he reaches out to her, but then takes his hand.

== Cast ==
- Kyle MacLachlan as FBI Special Agent Lloyd Gallagher / Park Ranger Robert Stone / Alhague
- Michael Nouri as Sergeant Tom Beck / Alhague
- Claudia Christian as Brenda Lee Van Buren / The Hidden
- Clarence Felder as Lieutenant John Masterson / The Hidden
- Clu Gulager as Lieutenant Ed Flynn
- Ed O'Ross as Detective Cliff Willis / The Hidden
- William Boyett as Jonathan Miller / The Hidden
- Richard Brooks as Detective Sanchez
- Katherine Cannon as Barbara Beck
- Larry Cedar as Detective Brem
- Chris Mulkey as Jack DeVries / The Hidden
- John McCann as Senator Holt / The Hidden
- Lin Shaye as Carol Miller
- Danny Trejo as Jailed Prisoner

== Production ==
Director Jack Sholder was drawn to the film because of the script. Writer Jim Kouf had originally expressed interest in directing, but when the studios refused, he lost interest in the script. Sholder, who saw the potential to turn it into more than an action film, did a rewrite to heighten the themes of what it means to be human. Casting for the film was difficult; they used auditions and could not cast Agent Gallagher until several days before shooting began. Sholder later called MacLachlan "an inspired choice", though Sholder clashed with Nouri. Nouri and MacLachlan both liked the script, and, during auditions, agreed to do the film if the other was involved.

Interviewed by director Tim Hunter in 2000, Sholder recalled that the police station seen throughout the film was a set "built into some raw space at the Lincoln Heights Jail."

== Soundtrack ==
The score, which was composed by Michael Convertino, was released on Varese Sarabande Records on January 30, 2007.

Songs featured in the film include:

- "Hidden" – The Truth
- "Black Girl White Girl" – The Lords of the New Church
- "Is There Anybody In There?" – Hunters & Collectors
- "Say Good Bye" – Hunters & Collectors
- "On Your Feet" – Shok Paris
- "Going Down Fighting" – Shok Paris
- "Weapons of Love" – The Truth
- "Still in Hollywood" – Concrete Blonde
- "Your Haunted Head" – Concrete Blonde
- "While the Going's Good" – Twin Set & the Pearls
- "You Make Me Feel So Young" – Brian Gunboty
- "Out of Control (In My Car)" – ULI
- "Bad Girl" – Mendy Lee
- "Over Your Shoulder" – Concrete Blonde

== Release ==
The film was released theatrically in the United States by New Line Cinema in October 1987. It turned out to be a modest hit for the company, grossing $9,747,988 at the box office.

The film was released on VHS and laserdisc by Media Home Entertainment in 1988. In May 1997, Lumivision released the film on DVD as a Collector's Edition.

In 2000, New Line Home Entertainment released the film on special edition DVD. The film was re-released in a set including the sequel The Hidden II in 2005.

In August 2017, Warner Archive announced a remastered release of the film on Blu-ray format. It was released on September 12, 2017.

== Reception ==
Rotten Tomatoes, a review aggregator, reports that 76% of 33 surveyed critics gave the film a positive review; the average rating is 6.9/10. Variety wrote, "The Hidden is a well-constructed thriller, directed with swift assurance by Jack Sholder, brought down by an utterly conventional sci-fi ending." Roger Ebert of the Chicago Sun-Times rated it 3/4 stars and called it "a surprisingly effective film". Vincent Canby of The New York Times wrote, "The movie is mostly a series of automobile chases through Los Angeles, but there is also some humor." Kevin Thomas of the Los Angeles Times, called it "as unstintingly violent as it is crudely ingenious". Hal Hinson of The Washington Post wrote, "The Hidden is one of the most satisfying genre movies to hit the streets in a while." Writing in The Atlanta Constitution and other Cox papers, Eleanor Ringel assessed: "Hidden under this film's low budget lineage is a superb blend of sci-fi thrills and unexpected humor that evokes comparisons to The Terminator and Night of the Comet." She added that "the movie is extremely violent. Yet so surefooted is the tone that the violence is never gratuitous."

In a 1992 retrospective, James M. Silver of the Los Angeles Times wrote that the film did not have a long enough release to attract a proper audience but is "outstanding". It has since become a cult film.

=== Awards ===
- Jack Sholder won the Grand Prize at the Avoriaz Fantastic Film Festival in 1988.
- Jack Sholder won Best Director at Fantasporto in 1988. It was also nominated for Best Film at that festival.
- Michael Nouri won Best Actor at the Catalan International Film Festival in 1987. Jack Sholder took Prize of the International Critics’ Jury at the same festival.
- At the 1988 Saturn Awards, Michael Nouri was nominated for Best Actor, Jack Sholder was nominated for Best Director, Jim Kouf was nominated for best writing, and The Hidden was nominated for Best Science Fiction Film.
