= June and John =

2025 film directed by Luc Besson

- French poster
- Directed by: Luc Besson
- Written by: Luc Besson
- Produced by: Luc Besson; Virginie Besson-Silla
- Starring: Matilda Price; Luke Stanton Eddy; Ryan Shoos; Dean Testerman; Sherry Mattson; Honey Lauren; Ayanna S. Flemings
- Cinematography: Tobias Deml
- Edited by: Julien Rey
- Production company: EuropaCorp
- Release dates: April 17, 2025 (Paris); April 23, 2025 (Ciné+ OCS)
- Running time: 93 minutes
- Language: English

June and John is a 2025 English-language romantic comedy thriller film written and directed by Luc Besson.

== Plot ==
John, a man stuck in the monotonous routine of office life, is immediately drawn to the vibrant and energetic June, a woman whom he sees while riding the subway. John is encouraged by June to change his life and seek excitement outside of the office. June continues to push him beyond the limits of his comfort, ultimately leading him into a crime spree and on the run from the police.

== Cast ==
- Matilda Price as June
- Luke Stanton Eddy as John
- Ryan Shoos as Steven
- Dean Testerman as Francis
- Sherry Mattson as Odile
- Honey Lauren as John's Mother
- Ayanna S. Flemings as Myriam
- Don Scribner as Las Vegas Homeless Guy
- Marceline Orallo as Sex Worker / Bridesmaid
- Claire Montgomery as Contessa
- Ronald Joseph Miller as Contessa's Husband
- Myles Cranford as Melvin
- Filippo Becciani as Officer / Server
- Sean Zerbe as Rookie Cop
- Andrew Arnett as Alan Burke
- Christopher Cano as Andrew Collins
- Whitney Wegman-Wood as Homeless Woman

== Production ==
The film was shot in lockdown in Los Angeles during the COVID-19 pandemic.

== Release ==
The film premiered at the Grand Rex in Paris on April 17, 2025, followed by its broadcast on Ciné+ OCS on April 23, 2025.

== Reception ==
A review on the website Wired Italia reads, "The director of cult films such as Nikita, The Fifth Element, Léon, and Dogman returns with a work focused on the urgency of breaking free from the daily grind and enjoying life. He does so through the expressive faces of Luke Stanton, a cross between Sam Rockwell and Tom Cruise, and Matilda Price, a cross between Emma Stone and Margot Robbie." The review concludes, "Nothing original, but Besson's directorial touch is clearly noticeable. At 66, the French filmmaker continues to innovate and dare, this time crafting a fast-paced, rhythmic direction, informed by the language of social media and the use of iPhones and GoPros, in step with the times, with a road movie that in its final section strongly recalls a romantic version of Thelma & Louise. An independent, low-budget film, shot during a pandemic, perhaps less convincing than his previous works (and certainly not up to the level of the memorable Dogman), which nevertheless has the merit of reminding viewers of the importance of living, not surviving, and of doing everything to change one's existence for the better."

A review by Bruno Carmelo on meioamargo.com states that "Absolutely no cliché of American indie cinema and road movies escapes Besson in his English-language French production. [...] He works with static figures: John is the ultimate loser, in a caricature of tedious adulthood, while June is the endless excitement, in a caricature of childlike vivacity. Furthermore, the filmmaker seems to believe in the depth of this simple endeavor. [...] While the comedy and magical realism justify some concessions to naturalism, several interactions border on the ridiculous, thanks to the sepulchral conviction of this imagery, typical of newsstand self-help."

A review on the French website Télérama reads, "For nearly a quarter of a century, Luc Besson has sunk into the abyss dear to his little, frustrated free-diver's heart. With each film, he sinks deeper into mediocrity, searching for a second wind that never comes. It's not with this unworthy photocopied romance that he'll resurface, alas. Shot on an iPhone in 2020 in a Los Angeles then in full lockdown, this 'content' (to call it a film would be too much of an honor) resembles yet another aftereffect of the Covid epidemic. How can we imagine, in fact, that its director wasn't himself feverish, at the end of his rope and out of ideas, to dream up such a dud?"

Reviewer Christos Bakatselos of the website flix.gr gave the film a rating of 2 out of 5 stars, writing, "Luc Besson, always a lover of images and dreamy romance, decides this time to cross over to the other side of formalism, shooting the film entirely on a mobile phone. A choice that, although technically impressive in some places, ends up closer to the aesthetic style of Instagram Reels and less to a substantial cinematic experience. The project sometimes seems disarmingly spontaneous and sometimes simply naive, just like its story itself." The review concludes, "But what ultimately weighs down 'June & John' is not its technical choices, but its childish view of the concept of love. Love here is presented as a fantasy full of eggplant sunsets, abstract confessions and momentary romances – as if written by Pinterest's AI. The impulsiveness of the characters, which could be translated as youthful authenticity, ultimately turns into a naive overflow of emotions without background. In an era when the cinema of tenderness and personal perspective needs truths, 'June & John' looks more like a home movie that went the wrong way for festivals. Perhaps if Besson had left technological innovation behind a little and looked straight at what it means to be in love when you’re 20, the result would have been more substantial. As it stands, it's a film that seems to love the idea of love – but doesn’t know what to do with it."

Jacque Mandelbaum of Le Monde wrote, "The director of 'The Big Blue' delivers a juvenile essay that borders on a long, aestheticized music video."
