= She-Wolf of London (TV series) =

1990 American TV series

- Series intro
- Also known as: Love and Curses
- Genre: Horror; Comedy; Superhero
- Created by: Tom McLoughlin; Mick Garris
- Starring: Kate Hodge; Neil Dickson; Scott Fults; Jean Challis
- Composer: Steve Levine
- Country of origin: United States
- Original language: English
- No. of seasons: 1
- No. of episodes: 20

Production
- Executive producers: Sheldon Pinchuk; Bill Finnegan; Pat Finnegan; Patrick Dromgoole; Paul Sarony; Lee Goldberg; William Rabkin
- Running time: 60 minutes
- Production companies: The Finnegan-Pinchuk Company; HTV; Universal Television

Original release
- Network: Syndication
- Release: October 9, 1990 – April 10, 1991

She-Wolf of London is a television series produced by the Finnegan/Pinchuk Company, HTV and MCA Television Entertainment that aired in first-run syndication in the United States from October 1990 to April 1991. The first 14 episodes were filmed in England and aired under the She-Wolf title, and a second season of six episodes was filmed in Los Angeles and aired under the title Love and Curses, with a drastically reduced cast.

== Plot ==
American graduate student Randi Wallace (Kate Hodge) travels to Britain to study mythology with Prof. Ian Matheson (Neil Dickson). She arrives expecting a stodgy old academic, but Ian is young and the two are immediately attracted to one other. Their attraction increases but a complication quickly arises when Randi spends a night on the moors and is bitten by a werewolf. She survives what the local hospital thinks was an attack by a large rabid wolf; she insists that it was not a true wolf but instead something supernatural and she seeks Ian's help. For the rest of the series, Randi and Ian investigate supernatural phenomena together while they search for a cure for her lycanthropy and he becomes her keeper during her transformations. Randi's curse draws the attention of various supernatural creatures: another werewolf; spirit possession; succubus; a possessed bookstore; a bogeyman; an evil carnival; a Guy Fawkes spirit; a killer horseman, and in a small town, zombies who ultimately confront Randi in her werewolf form (Diane Youdale). Eventually, their search takes them from British academe to American TV, when they move back to Randi's native California and Ian becomes host of a trashy TV talk show focusing on psychic phenomena.

The series was an old-style romantic comedy with a touch of horror. The romantic comedy comes from Randi and Ian's relationship, and their relationship to the Matheson family and the people she and Ian work for. Randi's transformations did not occur every episode but only during the full moon. This gave her and Ian a chance to investigate the supernatural without having to face possible lycanthropic transformations every week.

== Cast ==
- Kate Hodge as Randi Wallace
- Neil Dickson as Prof. Ian Matheson
- Scott Fults as Julian Matheson
- Jean Challis as Mum Matheson
- Arthur Cox as Dad Matheson
- Dorothea Phillips as Aunt Elsa
- Diane Youdale as Randi (She-Wolf)
- Dan Gilvezan as Skip Seville

== Characters ==
Kate Hodge – As a graduate student Randi Wallace, who after surviving a werewolf attack, fears what she will become every time there's a full moon.

Neil Dickson – As mythology professor Ian Matheson, who helps Randi (Kate Hodge), search for a cure, he develops a sense of humor and he is the protector of Randi.

== Background ==
She-Wolf of London was part of the Hollywood Premiere Network, an early attempt by Universal Television to create an "ad-hoc" syndication network. The series premiered along with two other shows, Shades of L.A. and They Came from Outer Space, on October 9, 1990. The package aired on many of the stations that would later become either UPN or WB affiliates.

The series included female nudity in some episodes, something not uncommon to European television, but considered taboo for U.S. non-cable television programming.

Midway through the first season, HTV pulled their financial backing, and the lower budget forced production to move to Los Angeles for the final six episodes. The series was retitled Love and Curses; Neil Dickson's character was dismissed from his position as a British professor and moved to L.A. to become the host of a talk show investigating the paranormal (explained by the success of one of his books after it was issued with a trashy mass market title). The joint UK/US production ended after its first season, along with the cancellation of two other Hollywood Premiere Network shows.

Episodes of the series ran on the Sci-Fi Channel for a short time following its cancellation. For these airings, the Love and Curses episodes were retitled She-Wolf of London. The opening sequence for these episodes were replaced by the show's original opening. These episodes were also retitled when run in Britain on Sky One, with the opening moments of the She-Wolf titles used to establish the series's title logo, before the titles cut to the Love and Curses opening credits sequence.

== Episodes ==
=== As "She-Wolf of London"/"Love & Curses" ===
No.	Title	Directed by	Written by	Original release date
1	"She-Wolf of London"	Dennis Abey	Mick Garris & Tom McLoughlin	October 9, 1990
2	"The Bog Man of Letchmoor Heath"	Roger Cheveley	Anthony Adams	October 16, 1990
3	"Moonlight Becomes You"	Brian Grant	Valerie West	October 23, 1990
4	"The Juggler"	Gerry Mill	Jim Henshaw	October 30, 1990
5	"Nice Girls Don't"	Roger Cheveley	Story by : Abbie Bernstein & Lee Goldberg & William Rabkin; Teleplay by : William Rabkin & Lee Goldberg	November 6, 1990
6	"Little Bookshop of Horrors"	Gerry Mill	William Rabkin & Lee Goldberg	November 13, 1990
7	"Can't Keep a Dead Man Down: Part 1"	Roger Cheveley	Lee Goldberg & William Rabkin	November 20, 1990
8	"Can't Keep a Dead Man Down: Part 2"	Roger Cheveley	William Rabkin & Lee Goldberg	November 27, 1990
9	"The Wild Hunt"	Brian Grant	Diana Ayers & Susan Sebastian	December 4, 1990
10	"What's Got Into Them?"	Dennis Abey	Lee Goldberg & William Rabkin	January 12, 1991
11	"Big Top She-Wolf"	Brian Grant	Kate Boutilier	January 19, 1991
12	"She Devil"	Dennis Abey	William Rabkin & Lee Goldberg	January 26, 1991
13	"Voodoo Child"	Roger Cheveley	Terry Erwin	February 2, 1991
14	"Beyond the Beyond"	Brian Grant	Story by : Arthur Sellers & Lee Goldberg & William Rabkin; Teleplay by : Lee Goldberg & William Rabkin	February 9, 1991
15	"Curiosity Killed the Cravitz"	Brian Grant	William Rabkin & Lee Goldberg	March 6, 1991
16	"Habeas Corpses"	Chuck Bowman	Lee Goldberg & William Rabkin	March 13, 1991
17	"Bride of the Wolfman"	Bruce Seth Green	Kate Boutilier	March 20, 1991
18	"Heart Attack"	Chuck Bowman	William Rabkin & Lee Goldberg	March 27, 1991
19	"Mystical Pizza"	Bruce Seth Green	Lee Goldberg & William Rabkin	April 3, 1991
20	"Eclipse"	Gary Walkow	Richard Manning & Hans Beimler	April 10, 1991

== DVD release ==
It was announced on November 18, 2009 that all 20 episodes of She-Wolf of London/Love and Curses would be released in a complete series box set from Universal Studios Home Entertainment. The DVD set titled She-Wolf of London: Love and Curses was released on February 2, 2010, as a four-disc set. The boxed set contains no extras and the opening credits of the series were changed. As aired originally, the fourteen UK-based She-Wolf of London episodes had ominous, moody title music; the six L.A.-based Love and Curses episodes had title music with the same melody but in a more upbeat, saxophone-heavy arrangement. All twenty episodes in the DVD begin with the Love and Curses title music (and the onscreen title Love and Curses).
