= The Louie Show =

American television sitcom

- Genre: Sitcom
- Created by: Louie Anderson; Matt Goldman
- Starring: Louie Anderson
- Composers: Tom Hiel; Scott Pinkerton
- Country of origin: United States
- Original language: English
- No. of seasons: 1
- No. of episodes: 6 (1 unaired)

Production
- Executive producers: Matt Goldman; Diane English; Joel Shukovsky
- Camera setup: Multi-camera
- Running time: 30 minutes
- Production company: Shukovsky English Entertainment

Original release
- Network: CBS
- Release: January 31 – March 6, 1996

The Louie Show is an American sitcom television series that aired on CBS from January 31 until March 6, 1996, co-created by and starring comedian Louie Anderson.

== Premise ==
A psychotherapist in Duluth, Minnesota deals with his friends and family.

== Cast ==
- Louie Anderson as Dr. Louie Lundgren
- Bryan Cranston as Det. Curt Sincic
- Paul Feig as Dr. Jake Reinhardt
- Kate Hodge as Gretchen Lafayette
- Laura Innes as Sandy Sincic
- Nancy Becker-Kennedy as Helen
- Kimmy Robertson as Kimmy

== Episodes ==
No.	Title	Directed by	Written by	Original release date
1	"Take Two Donuts and Call Me in the Morning"	Asaad Kelada	Matt Goldman & Louie Anderson	January 31, 1996
Louie thinks he has to take in a roommate to defer the costs of a roof repair. He also encounters a hostile patient at work.
2	"Louie Gets Suspended"	Asaad Kelada	Don Foster	February 7, 1996
Louie is late for his first meeting with a new supervisor, and she suspends him for a week.
3	"Under the Rug"	Joanna Gleason	Jhoni Marchinko	February 14, 1996
Louie advises Eddie to remove his toupee.
4	"Scratcher"	Asaad Kelada	Matt Goldman	February 21, 1996
Louie finds the lotto ticket of a compulsive gambler he has been counseling.
5	"Louie's Little Trip"	Joanna Gleason	Don Foster and Jhoni Marchinko	March 6, 1996
Louie searches for Curt and Gretchen while he's high on morphine.
6	"A Brush with Bob"	Joanna Gleason	Don Foster and Jhoni Marchinko	UNAIRED
One of Louie's patients, an embezzler, asks Gretchen out on a date.
