= Thom Michael Mulligan =

American actor and producer

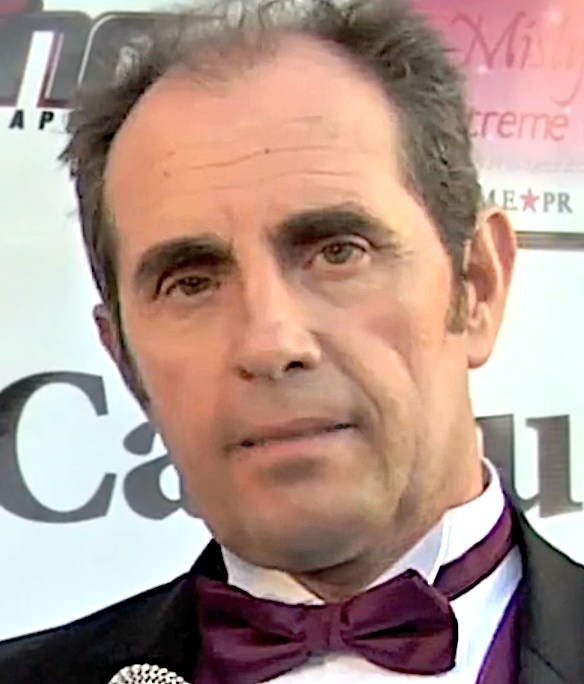
- Mulligan in 2010
- Education: Irvington High School; The City College of New York
- Occupations: Actor; film producer; executive director; playwright
- Years active: 1983–present
- Known for: Callous; Just Dirty Laundry; New Hope Film Festival; Sex, Drugs & Rock & Roll
- Notable credits: Burn This; Sweet Taste of Souls; True West
- Awards: 2009 Best Picture Oceanside International Film Festival

Thomas Michael Mulligan is an American actor, film producer, executive director, and playwright. He appeared in two plays, True West (1986) and Burn This (1990), and the horror film Sweet Taste of Souls (2020). Mulligan is executive director of submissions at New Hope Film Festival, wrote the play Just Dirty Laundry (1986) and won Best Picture for Callous (2009) at the Oceanside International Film Festival.

== Early life and education ==
Mulligan grew up in New York City as the son of Janet and John Mulligan. He became interested in acting at the age of seven, and played sports in high school and college.

Mulligan attended Irvington High School. In 1967, he entered the United States Navy as an Electrician's mate 3rd class aboard the USS Luiseno stationed at Newport, Rhode Island. He later served in the Vietnam War from 1969 to 1970. Mulligan initially pursued a career as a Major League Baseball pitcher but by the time he was 30, he had taken up acting in full-time in New York City.

== Career ==
Mulligan appeared in a charity performance as a guest artist for Fantasies at New Oxford High School in 1983. In 1986, his first submitted play, Just Dirty Laundry, took place at Theatre on the Towpath in New Hope, Pennsylvania. He had his voice recorded in 1993 for educational purposes about artifacts at the Historical Museum in Clinton, New Jersey. In 1994, Mulligan moved to California to further his acting career.

Mulligan produced and acted in Callous which premiered at Riverside International Film Festival in 2009. In 2011, he directed a short play called Code 7 that tied for first place at New Vision Theatre Company's Summer Shorts program.

Since its inauguration in 2010, Mulligan has been the executive director of submissions of the New Hope Film Festival in New Hope, Pennsylvania and hosted their award ceremony in 2017. In 2020, he starred in Sweet Taste of Souls with Honey Lauren. Mulligan is based in Oceanside, California.

== Stage credits ==
Year	Title	Role	Location	Notes
1982	Anna Christie	—N/a	New York	
1986	Ghost of a Chance	—N/a	Theatre on the Towpath, New Hope, Pennsylvania	
1986	Just Dirty Laundry	Randy Miller	Theatre on the Towpath, New Hope, Pennsylvania	playwright
1986	Camelot	Various	Theatre on the Towpath, New Hope, Pennsylvania	
1986	True West	Lee	Theatre on the Towpath, New Hope, Pennsylvania	
1989	Same Time, Next Year	George	Highpoint Dinner Theatre, Chalfont, Pennsylvania	
1990	Burn This	Pale	N.J. Public Theatre, Berkeley Heights, New Jersey	
1992	Sex, Drugs & Rock & Roll	Various	Towpath House Restaurant, New Hope, Pennsylvania	by Eric Bogosian
1992	The Woolgatherer	Cliff	Towpath House Restaurant, New Hope, Pennsylvania	
1993	Drinking in America	—N/a	Theatre on the Towpath, New Hope, Pennsylvania	
1995	Guilty Conscience	Arthur Jamison	OnStage Playhouse, Chula Vista, California	

== Filmography ==
Year	Title	Role	Ref.
2008	A Gothic Tale	Pastor	
2009	Callous	Pete Young	
2018	The Witching Hour	Jimmy Callahan	
2019	RoboWoman	Detective Murphy	
2020	Sweet Taste of Souls	Barney	
2020	Arachnado	Kathi	
2021	Rattlers 2	Bridger	
2021	Apex Predators	Dr. Juke Westwin	
2021	Night Hunter	Lee Jackson Sr.	
2021	Angel Mountain	Frank	
2021	Amityville in the Hood	Detective White	
2022	The Boss Man	Soldier	
2022	American Bigfoot	Red Stone	
2022	DumbFellas	Sonny Clamato	

Accolades
List of awards and nominations
Event	Year	Award	Title	Result	Ref.
New Vision Theatre Company's Summer Shorts	2011	1st place	Code 7	Won	
Big Bear Lake International Film Festival	2009	Best Feature	Callous	Won	
Riverside International Film Festival	2009	Best Feature	Callous	Won	
Oceanside International Film Festival	2009	Best Picture	Callous	Won	
