= Devil's Pond =

- Movie poster
- Directed by: Joel Viertel
- Written by: Alek Friedman; Mora Stephens; Joel Viertel
- Produced by: John Davis; J. Todd Harris; Craig Davis Roth
- Starring: Kip Pardue; Tara Reid
- Cinematography: Matthew Jensen
- Edited by: Jeff Wood
- Music by: Louis Febre
- Production companies: Davis Entertainment Filmworks; Splendid Pictures
- Distributed by: Artisan Home Entertainment
- Release date: December 16, 2003
- Running time: 92 minutes
- Country: United States
- Language: English
- Budget: $5 million

Devil's Pond (alternatively known as Heaven's Pond) is a 2003 American thriller film directed by Joel Viertel, who co-wrote it with Alek Friedman and Mora Stephens. It stars Kip Pardue and Tara Reid as newlyweds who head to a remote lake house for their honeymoon, during which the husband turns it into a prison for his new wife. It was released direct-to-video in the United States by Artisan Home Entertainment on December 16, 2003.

== Plot ==
Newlyweds Mitch and Julianne escape their normal lives and travel to a deserted island for a romantic and adventurous honeymoon, staying for two weeks at an old cottage in the middle of a secluded lake. They discover the area has no electricity or phone coverage, as Julianne tries to settle in despite her fear of water and inability to swim. Mitch enjoys the country life, and when Julianne wants to go into town to call her parents, to confirm her safety, he gets overprotective of her.

While the two weeks go by, Julianne is eager to return home to start their new lives, but Mitch refuses to go back to that life, wanting them to stay put in his ideal setting, even when Julianne cannot find her birth control pills to prevent her pregnancy. When Julianne finds out Mitch had stalked her before they met and got married, she attempts to leave, and she sees a grave in the woods across the lake before Mitch brings her back. To ensure that she does not attempt to escape again, Mitch disposes of their boat.

One night as Mitch is asleep, Julianne takes the key worn around his neck to open his safe box, having grown suspicious of it. She finds a property deed and learns he inherited the land from his deceased father and that he had often visited the property with his dad. Using a raft to head across the lake, she tries to escape again in Mitch's pick-up truck, only for Mitch to find her there, and knock her unconscious. Chained to an anchor and a tree, Julianne realizes how psychotic Mitch is, and that he knew everything about her, including her fear of water, using it to hold her at their location.

Determined to leave, Julianne burns their matches, forcing Mitch to go into town to buy new ones. While he is gone, she gets an axe and breaks free from the chain. He comes back unexpectedly early, and she is almost discovered in her act of escape. When he finds out about it, Mitch begins physically abusing her, before quickly deciding to kill her. A struggle ensues, during which Mitch ends up stepping into a bear trap that she had buried, allowing Julianne to counterattack and eventually use the shotgun he brought back to shoot him in the arm. Mitch remains alive, but he can barely move and is unable to fight back, as Julianne frees herself and leaves a defeated and weeping Mitch for dead, with the shotgun. Overcoming her fear of water, Julianne swims across the lake to the other side and later hears a gunshot, indicating that Mitch has killed himself, seemingly unable to cope with the fact that he has lost Julianne forever due to his own abusive, controlling nature.

The final scene shows Julianne leaving her wedding ring in Mitch's disabled truck and walking away down a country road to an uncertain future, but free.

== Cast ==
- Kip Pardue as Mitch
- Tara Reid as Julianne
- Meredith Baxter as Kate
- Dan Gunther as the Priest
- Guy Graves as Kate's husband (uncredited)

== Production ==
Devil's Pond was shot on location at Horseshoe Lake near Libby, Montana.
