= Satan Was a Lady (2001 film) =

- DVD cover art
- Directed by: Doris Wishman
- Written by: Doris Wishman
- Produced by: Beau Gillespie
- Starring: Honey Lauren; Glyn Styler; Edge; Hans Lohl; Carlos Velazquez; Laudet Torres; Anne Case; Al Reidel; Rene Coman; Victoria Morrison
- Cinematography: Willem Van Vark
- Edited by: David Bialos; Pablo Coig; Russell Fogle; Nelson Olivieri
- Music by: Rene Coman; Glyn Styler; Jeff Treffinger
- Production company: Boomshadow Pictures
- Release date: January 6, 2001
- Budget: $100,000

Satan Was a Lady is a 2001 drama film by Doris Wishman. It stars Honey Lauren, Glyn Styler, Edge, and Hans Lohl.

== Plot ==
A prostitute blackmails, betrays, and murders anyone who gets in her way.

== Cast ==
- Honey Lauren as Cleo Irane
- Glyn Styler as Ed Baines
- Edge as John King
- Hans Lohl as Brett King
- Carlos Velazquez as Jake
- Laudet Torres as Lotte
- Anne Case as Tess King
- Al Reidel as The John
- Rene Coman as Rene
- Victoria Morrison as Syd
- Kerry Johnston as Dancer
- Lindsey Amodeo as Stripper
- Tabatha DeMercado as Tabatha
- Arturo Reyes as Clerk
- Lourdes Graves as Waitress
- Harry Fredrick as Big Tipper
- Greg Gillingham as Stash

== Production ==
Beau Gillespie produced the film for $100,000.

== Reception ==
On the review aggregator website Rotten Tomatoes, 20% of 5 critics' reviews are positive, with an average rating of 5.4/10.

Film Threat and Joe Bob Briggs praised Lauren's performance. Jack Helbig at Chicago Reader criticized the dialogue, storytelling and acting. Film critic Mike Everleth said it was "like a lurid 1950s paperback about a bad girl trying to go good." The Miami Herald said the film offers no entertainment value.

Wishman won the Comeback Kid Award at the New York Underground Film Festival.
