= Rosina Fernhoff =

American actress (1931–2026)

- Born: April 13, 1931; New York City, U.S.
- Died: March 13, 2026 (aged 94); New York City, U.S.
- Occupation: Actress
- Years active: 1951–2026
- Spouse(s): Avraham Inlender (died 2003); 2 daughters

Rosina Fernhoff (April 13, 1931 – March 13, 2026) was an American actress known for her work in the theatre. She often performed plays that dealt with Jewish themes.

== Background ==
Fernhoff was born in New York City on April 13, 1931, the daughter of Austrian-Jewish immigrant parents Dr. William and Tola Fernhoff.

She was a graduate of Carnegie Mellon with a B.F.A in Theatre and furthered her studies at Bank Street College of Education in New York City. Fernhoff was married to artist, playwright and director Avraham Inlender (died 2003). Her husband immigrated from Poland to Israel and the U.S. Both had lost family members to the Holocaust. They had two daughters. Fernhoff studied acting with Lee Strasberg.

A resident of New York City, she continued to perform in theater, film, and tour her one-woman shows. In August 2014, she performed in New York City at the Fresh Fruit Festival as Alice B. Toklas in The Conversion of Alice B. Toklas by Carol Polcovar.

Fernhoff died on March 13, 2026, at the age of 94.

== Career ==
Fernhoff won an Obie Award for Best Actress in 1959 for her performance in two Off-Broadway plays, Fashion as Gertrude, by Anna Cora Mowatt, and The Geranium Hat as Anne-Betty by Bernard Evslin.

She was known for performing plays written by her husband, Av Inlender. These plays included Jerusalem Story, a play that relates the story of the kidnapping of a young boy in Israel for political gain, Mrs. Davidson's Story, which revolves around an American teacher in an Israeli school that is taken-over by terrorists and Shadows, the story of a Russian Jewish choreographer who through her personal story, pleads for asylum for imprisoned Jews in the antisemitic Soviet Union.

"Snow People", a play adapted by Av Inlender from his novel, Zoa, also stars Fernhoff, as Anna Blake, the daughter of a Holocaust survivor who discovers fifty years later the Nazis who terrorized her family. In 2006, Fernhoff performed Snow People at Colorado State University as a special guest for their Holocaust Awareness Week. She has performed these one-person shows at theaters, colleges and Synagogues across the United States, in Europe and Israel. In addition to acting, Fernhoff directed and coached.

Fernhoff was a member of Carnival Girls Productions, and on November 15, 2014, she was honored with a Lifetime Achievement Award at Speyer Hall, University Settlement in New York City.

She was fluent in Hebrew and German. In her youth, she performed classic roles in Israel at the Cameri Theater such as Juliet in Romeo and Juliet. Her other credits include starring roles in The Glass Menagerie, Come Back, Little Sheba, Hamlet, The Piano Teacher, and The Quickening.

=== Film and television ===
In film, she appeared in supporting roles, Love Hunter (2013) and Bobby Dogs (2007). Fernhoff appeared in numerous short films including Man of the House, which screened at the 2012 Cannes Film Festival. She also starred in the Streamy nominated web series Spring Street.
