= The Last Man (2002 film) =

2002 film by Harry Ralston

The Last Man.
- Poster for the film
- Directed by: Harry Ralston
- Written by: Harry Ralston
- Produced by: Tamara Hernandez; Jessica Rains; Harry Ralston
- Starring: David Arnott; Jeri Ryan; Dan Montgomery
- Cinematography: Michael Grady
- Edited by: Tony Miller
- Music by: Woody Jackson; Ivan Knight
- Production companies: ID Films Los Angeles, CA
- Distributed by: Castle Hill Productions; Lions Gate Entertainment
- Release dates: February 15, 2002 (US); July 9, 2002 (DVD)
- Running time: 95 minutes
- Country: United States
- Language: English
- Box office: $3,908

The Last Man is a 2002 American science fiction romantic comedy movie written and directed by Harry Ralston, starring David Arnott, Jeri Ryan and Dan Montgomery.

== Plot ==
Alan Gould, a neurotic, unkempt anthropology graduate student, is beginning to believe he may be the last living person on the planet. A mysterious catastrophe appears to have killed everyone but him. Buildings are left standing and goods are left untouched. When he is not running around in his underwear, reveling in his newly found freedom from body-shaming, he is in abandoned stores downtown trying stuff out. Alan acquires a video camera on one of his expeditions and decides to make a video log explaining to any alien race that stumbles upon the empty planet what he thinks went wrong, interjected with references to his fieldwork among the primitive Shitabi tribe of the Amazon Basin. He also tries, mostly unsuccessfully, to embrace the peaceful philosophy of the Shitabi people.

One day, much to Alan's delight, he finds Sarah. She is beautiful, but he knows that before the apocalypse, she would not have spent time with him even if he was the last man on Earth. Sarah was unfaithful in some important relationships, and now she has convinced herself God is punishing her for her sins. She does not consider Alan to be an ideal mate, but he is her only option at the moment. Alan falls in love with her, and tries to convince her they have to repopulate the world. She makes him promise he will never leave her, and although she does not allow him to touch her, she reluctantly joins him in his RV.

While driving into town to gather supplies, the couple passes a hitchhiker carrying a large backpack. Alan's first impulse is to simply keep driving, but Sarah forces him to stop. The hitchhiker is Raphael, a handsome, charismatic young man. He does not appear to be as smart as Alan, but he is easygoing and quite engaging. Of course, Alan is jealous as Sarah is immediately drawn to Raphael, this mysterious (hunky) stranger.

Alan gets jealous and begins plotting ways to get rid of Raphael, his new nemesis. After some time he decides to let Fate take charge, and he waits for Raphael to mess up, hopefully, sending Sarah running back to him. Somehow, the two men blow up a memorial that Sarah had built. Alan talks to Raphael about it while secretly taping the conversation, but at the end of the conversation, Raphael decides to leave. The last thing he says to Alan is that he loves Sarah. Later on, Sarah asks Alan if he had talked to Raphael before he left, and Alan lies to her saying he had not — he did not want to repeat Raphael's declaration of love. Raphael returns to the camp after finding one of the many notes Sarah had tied to balloons she had released that read, "Come back." After reconciling, the couple finds Alan's tapes and figure out that Alan had betrayed them, so they kick him out of the camp. Alan retaliates by driving a truck through the camp.

In the end, Alan places his camera on the ground and stands back. He tells his camera that he is heading south to find others who eat zinc, figuring that is the reason they all survived. He concludes with, "Life's a bitch, so be decent and try to respect one another's privacy." Then he runs up and kicks the camera.

== Cast ==
- David Arnott as Alan Gould, a quirky male anthropology graduate student living in an camper on the outskirts of San Francisco.
- Jeri Ryan as Sarah, a tall, shapely female, fickle by nature, and looking for companionship.
- Dan Montgomery Jr. as Raphael, dumb as a post but good with his hands, he now competes for Sarah's affections.
- Maureen Sutton as Dead woman in pink.
- Jennifer Sutton as Dead jogger.

== Release ==
=== Theaters ===
The Last Man was released for limited engagements to theaters in New York City and Los Angeles on February 13, 2002 and March 8, 2002, respectively.

=== Home media ===
The Last Man was released to video on July 9, 2002, in VHS and DVD formats.

== Reception ==
=== Box office ===
The film grossed $3,908 at the domestic box office.

=== Critical response ===
On review aggregator website Rotten Tomatoes, the film has a "rotten" 33% approval rating based on 12 reviews, with an average rating of 4.70/10. Metacritic assigned the film a weighted average score of 32 out of 100 based on reviews from nine critics, indicating "generally negative reviews".

A.O. Scott, a critic with The New York Times wrote: "It feels more like a thought experiment than a fully developed story." Maitland McDonagh, a movie reviewer for TV Guide wrote: "Ralston gets solid performances out of his cast, and the film has a surprisingly polished look. But in the end, there isn't much to it." Ed Park, a critic at The Village Voice wrote: "If The Last Man were the last movie left on earth, there would be a toss-up between presiding over the end of cinema as we know it and another night of delightful hand shadows."

In its review for The Hollywood Reporter, film critic Frank Scheck wrote: "What might have emerged as hilarious lunacy in the hands of Woody Allen or Mel Brooks (at least during their '70s heyday) comes across as lame and sophomoric in this debut indie feature."

=== Accolades ===
The Last Man was nominated for Best Film at the Fantasporto 2001 in Porto, Portugal. It won the Lumiere Award at the 2nd annual New Orleans Film Festival, and it won Best Independent Feature Award at the 11th edition of the Festival of Fantastic Films in Manchester, England.

== See also ==
- List of American films of 2002
- Men Cry Bullets
