= The Hidden II =

- British VHS Artwork
- Directed by: Seth Pinsker
- Written by: Jim Kouf (characters); Seth Pinsker
- Produced by: Mark Ordesky; David Helpern; Michael L. Meltzer
- Starring: Raphael Sbarge; Kate Hodge; Jovin Montanaro
- Cinematography: Bryan England
- Edited by: Christopher Cibelli
- Music by: David McHugh
- Distributed by: New Line Cinema
- Release date: September 6, 1993
- Running time: 91 minutes
- Country: United States
- Language: English

The Hidden II (styled as The Hidden 2) is a 1993 American direct-to-video science fiction crime horror film and the sequel to the 1987 film The Hidden.

== Plot ==
The alien criminal from the first movie is dead, but he left a few eggs which are hatching now. It is explained that on the alien's homeworld, evolution took two parallel paths: half of their race became violent criminals who live only for pleasure (the squid-like alien form briefly glimpsed in the first film), and the other half evolved beyond their base desires and even physical bodies, becoming creatures of pure energy.

Alhague, a good alien from the first movie, has been inhabiting Tom Beck's body (played now by Michael Welden). Alhague has been waiting just in case this happened. Unfortunately, his presence in the body has taken a terrible toll on it, draining it of life energy.

Additionally, relations with Beck's daughter Juliet (Kate Hodge), now a cop herself, have deteriorated (possibly due to his bizarre behavior caused by the alien inhabiting his body). But when the killing starts again, both will need to work together—and with a new alien policeman (Raphael Sbarge), who comes to Earth to aid in the struggle—to stop the new generation of aliens.

== Cast ==
- Raphael Sbarge as MacLachlan
- Kate Hodge as Juliet Beck
- Jovin Montanaro as Stanton
- Christopher Murphy as Tony Thompson
- Michael Welden as Sergeant Tom Beck / Alhague
- Honey Lauren as Rave Girl

== Production ==
In June 1993, it was reported that New Line Cinema had hired Seth Pinsker to direct The Hidden 2: The Spawning, a sequel to The Hidden.

The film was announced to be preceded by a three-part comic book limited series titled The Hidden: Gene War which would be written by Andy Mangels for Millennium Publications.

== Release ==
The film was released direct to video in the United States by New Line Home Video on July 20, 1994.

However, in Japan, it was released in September 1993, 10 months ahead of its US release.

In 2005, New Line Home Entertainment released the film on DVD on a double feature release alongside the original The Hidden.

== Reception ==
Creature Feature found the twist of the alien slowly being consumed interesting, but otherwise the sequel was found inferior to the original, giving it two out of 5 stars.

Moria gave the movie a half-star. While it found the pairing of Sbarge and Hodge to be a plus, especially as Sbarge attempts to understand human behavior, but found the rest of the movie to be an example of everything wrong with sequels.

While Entertainment Weekly enjoyed the first movie, it gave this one a D− finding it to be "crud."

The Encyclopedia of Science Fiction notes that the first 10 minutes of this movie are reprised from the first movie.
