= Men Cry Bullets =

- Directed by: Tamara Hernandez
- Written by: Tamara Hernandez
- Produced by: Harry Ralston; Tamara Hernandez
- Starring: Steven Nelson; Honey Lauren; Jeri Ryan; Michael Mangiamele; Harry Ralston; Bob Sherer
- Cinematography: Michael Grady
- Edited by: Scott Balcerek; Garth Grinde
- Music by: Woodrow Jackson; Ivan Knight; Forest Dunn
- Distributed by: Phaedra Cinema
- Release date: September 1999 (South by Southwest)
- Running time: 106 minutes
- Country: United States
- Language: English

Men Cry Bullets is a 1999 American comedy-drama film written and directed by Tamara Hernandez and starring Steven Nelson, Honey Lauren, Jeri Ryan, Michael Mangiamele and Harry Ralston.

== Cast ==
- Steven Nelson as Billy
- Honey Lauren as Gloria
- Jeri Ryan as Lydia
- Michael Mangiamele as Paper Boy
- Harry Ralston as Freddy Fishnets
- Bob Sherer as Booster
- Maximilian A. Mastrangelo as Billy's Father

== Release ==
The film had its world premiere at the South by Southwest film festival in September 1999. The film was then screened at the Angelika Film Center in New York City on October 22, 1999. It was also screened at the Roxie Theater in San Francisco on November 12, 1999.

== Reception ==
The film has a 40% rating on Rotten Tomatoes. Joe Bob Briggs of United Press International awarded the film one star.

== Accolade ==
The film won the Best Narrative Feature award at the South by Southwest film festival.
