= Jimmy Zip =

1996 short film & 1999 full-length film

Jimmy Zip is a 1996 short film starring Alyssa Milano, Spalding Gray and Justin Whalin.

It was remade into a 1999 full-length film, starring Brendan Fletcher and Adrienne Frantz.
