= Kip Pardue =

American actor (born 1975)

- Born: Kevin Ian Pardue; September 23, 1975 (age 50); Atlanta, Georgia, U.S.
- Education: Yale University (BA)
- Occupations: Actor, model
- Years active: 1999–2018

Kevin Ian Pardue (born September 23, 1975) is a former American actor and model, who became known for his roles in the films But I'm a Cheerleader (1999), Remember the Titans (2000), Driven (2001), The Rules of Attraction (2002), and Thirteen (2003).

== Early life and education ==
Born in Atlanta, Georgia, Pardue attended Dunwoody High School, where he played defensive back for the football team. Pardue was co-captain of Dunwoody's 1993 Georgia Class AAAA state football championship team. He also played center field for Dunwoody's baseball team. The name "Kip" comes from the initials of his full name. Pardue earned a Bachelor of Arts degree in economics from Yale University, where he played football.

== Career ==
After graduating from college, Pardue was discovered by Molly Ringwald's publicist. He has been a model for Armani, Polo and Abercrombie and Fitch. He was named as one of the "Top 10 Upcoming Actors" by Armani Exchange in 2001.

== Personal life ==
On October 31, 2018, the Hermosa Beach Police Department announced it was investigating a report of sexual misconduct filed by actress and intimacy coordinator Sarah Scott, who alleged she was "sexually violated while at work" in May by Pardue, who masturbated in front of her in his trailer while they were working on the premise pilot Mogulettes. She chose not to press charges and, on July 7, 2019, SAG-AFTRA, a labor union, fined him US$6,000 (equivalent to $7,600 in 2025) for sexually harassing Scott.

== Filmography ==
=== Film ===
Year	Title	Role	Notes
1999	But I'm a Cheerleader	Clayton Dunn	
2000	Whatever It Takes	Harris	
2000	Remember the Titans	Ronnie Bass	
2001	Driven	Jimmy Bly	
2002	The Rules of Attraction	Victor Johnson	
2002	Vacuums	Jack Bentley	
2003	Thirteen	Luke	
2003	Devil's Pond	Mitch	
2003	This Girl's Life	Kip	
2004	American Crime	Rob Latrobe	Direct-to-video
2004	The Heart Is Deceitful Above All Things	Luther	
2004	Imaginary Heroes	Matt Travis	
2004	Glitterati	Victor Ward	Unreleased
2005	Loggerheads	Mark Austin	
2005	Laura Smiles	Chris	
2005	Undiscovered	Euan Falcon	
2005	The Iris Effect	Paul Bergamo	
2006	Wasted	Mitch	
2007	The Trouble with Romance	Jack Romero	
2007	Ripple Effect	Tyler	
2007	The Wizard of Gore	Edmund Bigelow	
2007	South of Pico	Robert	
2007	Remarkable Power	Preston	
2008	Stag Night	Mike	
2009	Bitter/Sweet	Brian Chandler	
2010	Below the Beltway	Luke	
2011	The Briefcase		
2011	Answer This!	Lucas Brannstrom	
2011	Hostel: Part III	Carter	Direct-to-video
2013	Phantom	Yanis	
2013	Missionary	Ian Kingsmen	
2013	Slightly Single in L.A.	Zach	
2015	The Nymphets	Joe	
2016	American Fable	Abe	
2016	Beyond Valkyrie: Dawn of the 4th Reich	Clarence Edward	
2018	Brand New Old Love	David	
2019	Chokehold	Uncle Ray	Direct-to-video; filmed 2016

=== Television ===
Year	Title	Role	Notes
1999	7th Heaven	Chris	Episode: "Sometimes That's Just the Way It Is"
2006	House	Brent Mason	Episode: "Forever"
2006	ER	Ben Parker	6 episodes
2008	Princess	William Humphrey	TV movie
2013	Mad Men	Tim Jablonski	2 episodes
2013	The Nightmare Nanny	Ben Gerson	TV movie
2013	Holiday Road Trip	Davis	TV movie
2014	Looking for Mr. Right	George	TV movie
2014	Ray Donovan	FBI Agent Volchek	Recurring role (season 2)
2015	Agent X	Josh Robin	Episode: "Back in Your Arms"
2017	Imposters	Kurt Radcliffe	Episode: "Frog-Bikini-Eiffel Tower"
2017	Law and Order: Special Victims Unit	Reverend Gary Langham	Episode: "Conversion"
2017	NCIS: Los Angeles	Michael Silva	Episode: "Se Murio El Payaso"
2017–2018	Runaways	Frank Dean	Main cast (seasons 1–2)
2018	Mogulettes	Buckley	TV movie
2018	Hawaii Five-0	Special Agent Douglas Fischer	Episode: "Ka Hopu Nui 'Ana"
2018	Once Upon a Time	Chad	Episode: "Chosen"

=== Video games ===
Year	Title	Role
2017	Resident Evil 7: Biohazard	Alan Douglas

== Awards and nominations ==
Year	Group	Award	Result	Notes
2000	Las Vegas Film Critics Society Awards	Best Male Newcomer	Nominated	Remember the Titans
2002	Young Hollywood Awards	New Stylemaker - Male	Won	
2005	Vail Film Festival	Rising Star Award	Won	
