= Jeri Ryan =

American actress (born 1968)

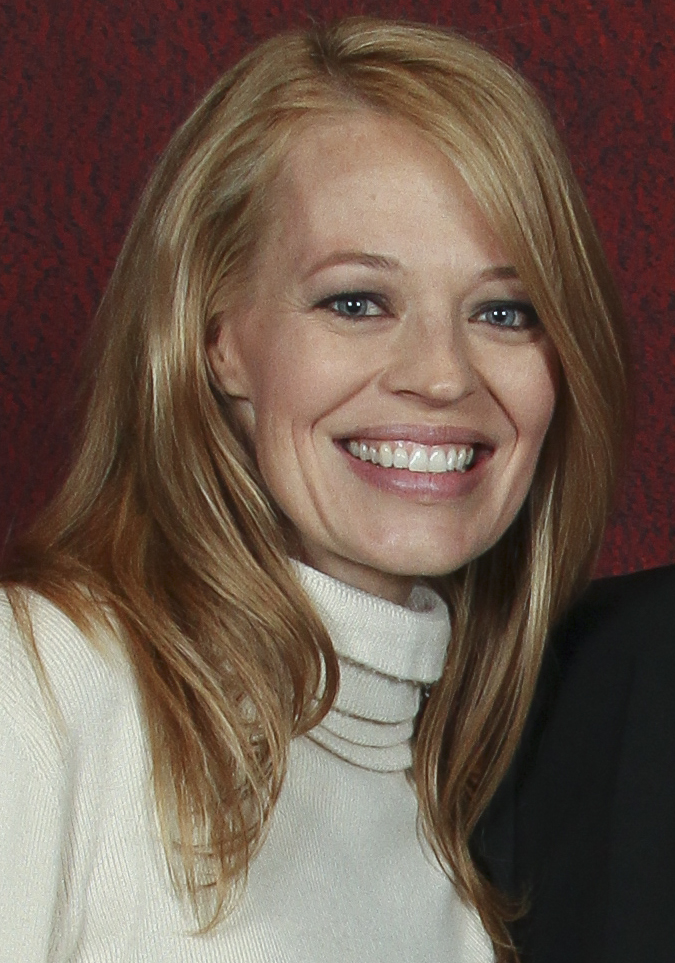
- Ryan in 2014
- Born: Jeri Lynn Zimmermann; February 22, 1968 (age 58); Munich, West Germany
- Education: Northwestern University (BA)
- Occupation: Actress
- Years active: 1991–present
- Known for: Star Trek: Voyager; Boston Public; Shark; Body of Proof; Star Trek: Picard
- Spouses: Jack Ryan (m. 1991; div. 1999); Christophe Émé (m. 2007)
- Children: 2

Jeri Lynn Ryan (née Zimmermann; born February 22, 1968) is an American actress best known for her role as the former Borg drone Seven of Nine in Star Trek: Voyager (1997–2001) and Star Trek: Picard (2020–2023), for which she won two Saturn Awards, in 2001 and 2024.

She is also known for her role as Veronica "Ronnie" Cooke on Boston Public (2001–2004), and as a regular on the science-fiction series Dark Skies (1997) and the legal drama series Shark (2006–2008). In 2009, she guest-starred on the series Leverage as Tara Cole. From 2011 to 2013, she starred as Dr. Kate Murphy in the ABC drama series Body of Proof, and from 2016 to 2019, she appeared as Veronica Allen on the Amazon Prime series Bosch.

== Early life ==
Ryan was born Jeri Lynn Zimmermann on February 22, 1968, in Munich, West Germany to father Gerhard Florian "Jerry" Zimmermann, a U.S. Army master sergeant, and mother Sharon, a social worker. Ryan grew up on Army posts in Kansas, Maryland, Hawaii, Georgia and Texas. She has an older brother.

When she was 11 years old, her father retired from the Army and the family settled in Paducah, Kentucky. She graduated from Lone Oak High School in 1986 as a National Merit Scholar. She attended Northwestern University, where she was a member of the Alpha Phi sorority. She graduated from Northwestern in 1990 with a bachelor's degree in theatre.

Ryan was Miss Illinois 1989. She competed in the Miss America 1990 pageant, where she placed third runner-up.

== Career ==
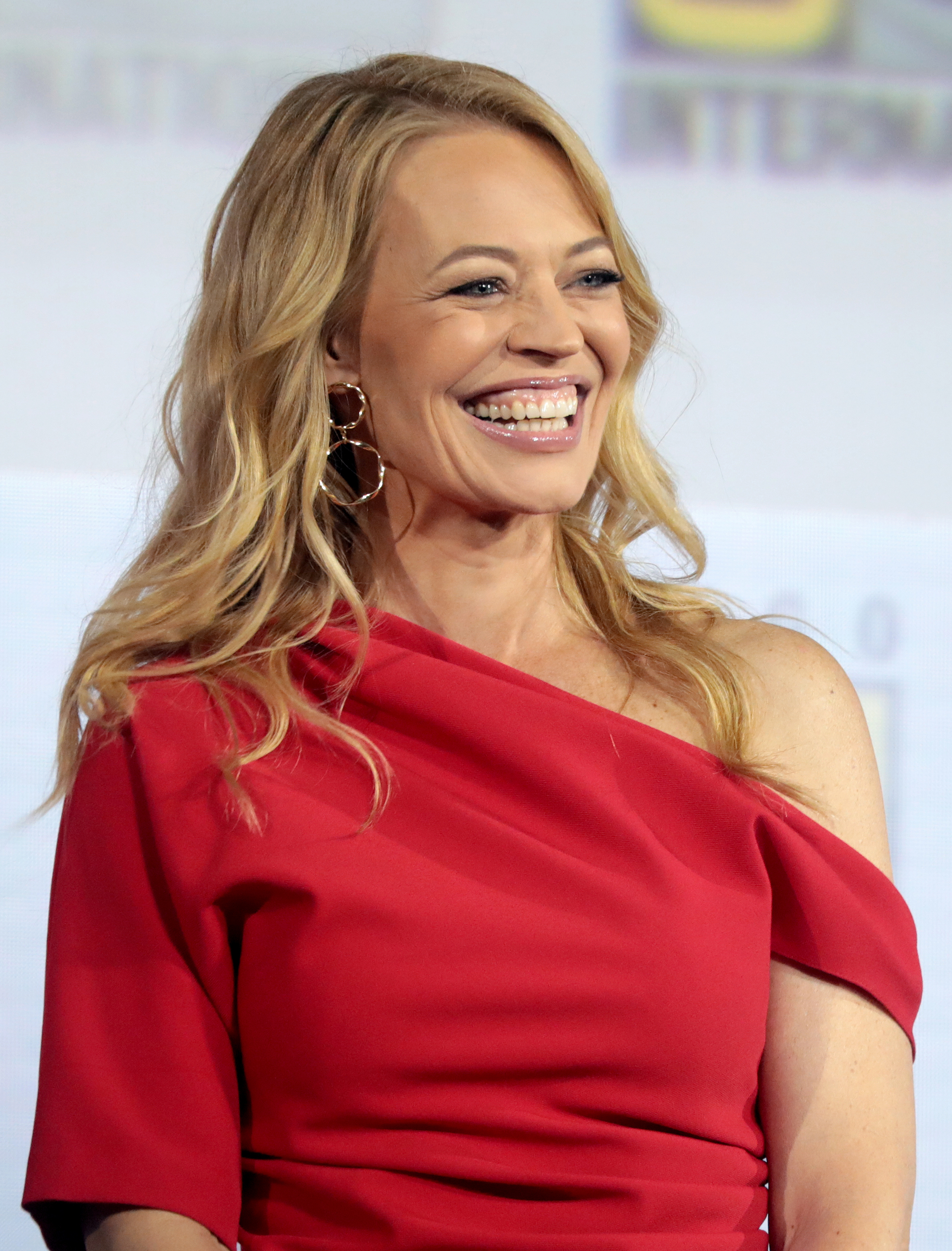
Ryan in 2019

After college, Ryan pursued acting full-time in Los Angeles. She made her acting debut in Who's the Boss?, and followed that with guest-starring roles in television series such as Melrose Place, Matlock, and The Sentinel, as well as TV movies.

She had a regular role as extraterrestrial investigator Juliet Stuart on the television series Dark Skies, which was cancelled after one season.

In 1997, Ryan was chosen for a role on the science-fiction series Star Trek: Voyager as Seven of Nine, a Borg drone who was freed from the Borg's collective consciousness. When she joined the cast in season four, ratings increased 60%.

She appeared in Wes Craven's Dracula 2000. After Voyager ended in 2001, Ryan joined the cast of Boston Public as Veronica "Ronnie" Cooke, a frustrated lawyer who becomes a high-school teacher. David E. Kelley, the series' producer, wrote the role specifically for her. The series ended in 2004.

Ryan appeared in the romantic-comedy film Down with Love and as Lydia in the independent film Men Cry Bullets. Her first film lead was in The Last Man as the last woman left on Earth.

In 2005, she had a role in a TV pilot titled Commuters, a suburban version of Desperate Housewives. She had a recurring role as Charlotte Morgan on The O.C. in 2005, and she guest-starred as Courtney Reece on David E. Kelley's Boston Legal in 2006. Ryan then co-starred in the legal drama Shark as Los Angeles County District Attorney Jessica Devlin alongside series lead James Woods, but she did not return for episodes aired after the 2007–2008 Writers Guild of America strike; she was credited in all four episodes. CBS cancelled the broadcast of the series after its season-two finale.

She guest-starred as defense attorney Patrice La Rue on the April 7, 2009, episode of Law & Order: Special Victims Unit, her first role since giving birth to her daughter Gisele. Ryan next had a seven-episode role on the drama Leverage in season two as a grifter named Tara Cole, filling in while series regular Gina Bellman was on maternity leave.

She was in Kevin Tancharoen's short film Mortal Kombat: Rebirth as Sonya Blade. Although originally a film, it was marketed as a web series, with previews scheduled to appear online in June 2010. The web series Mortal Kombat: Legacy officially launched in March 2011.

Ryan was a regular in the series Body of Proof, which premiered on March 29, 2011.

Ryan continued to appear in guest roles on genre television series, including the science-fiction series Warehouse 13 as Marine Major Amanda Lattimer, ex-wife of the series' male lead character Pete Lattimer, in the episode "Queen for a Day". She made a return guest appearance on the drama Leverage in season four, episode 13 as grifter Tara Cole, in the episode "The Girls' Night Out Job". She also appeared for a multiepisode arc in season one of the science-fiction series Helix. She was next seen in the series Star Trek: Picard, reprising her role as Seven of Nine.

== Personal life ==
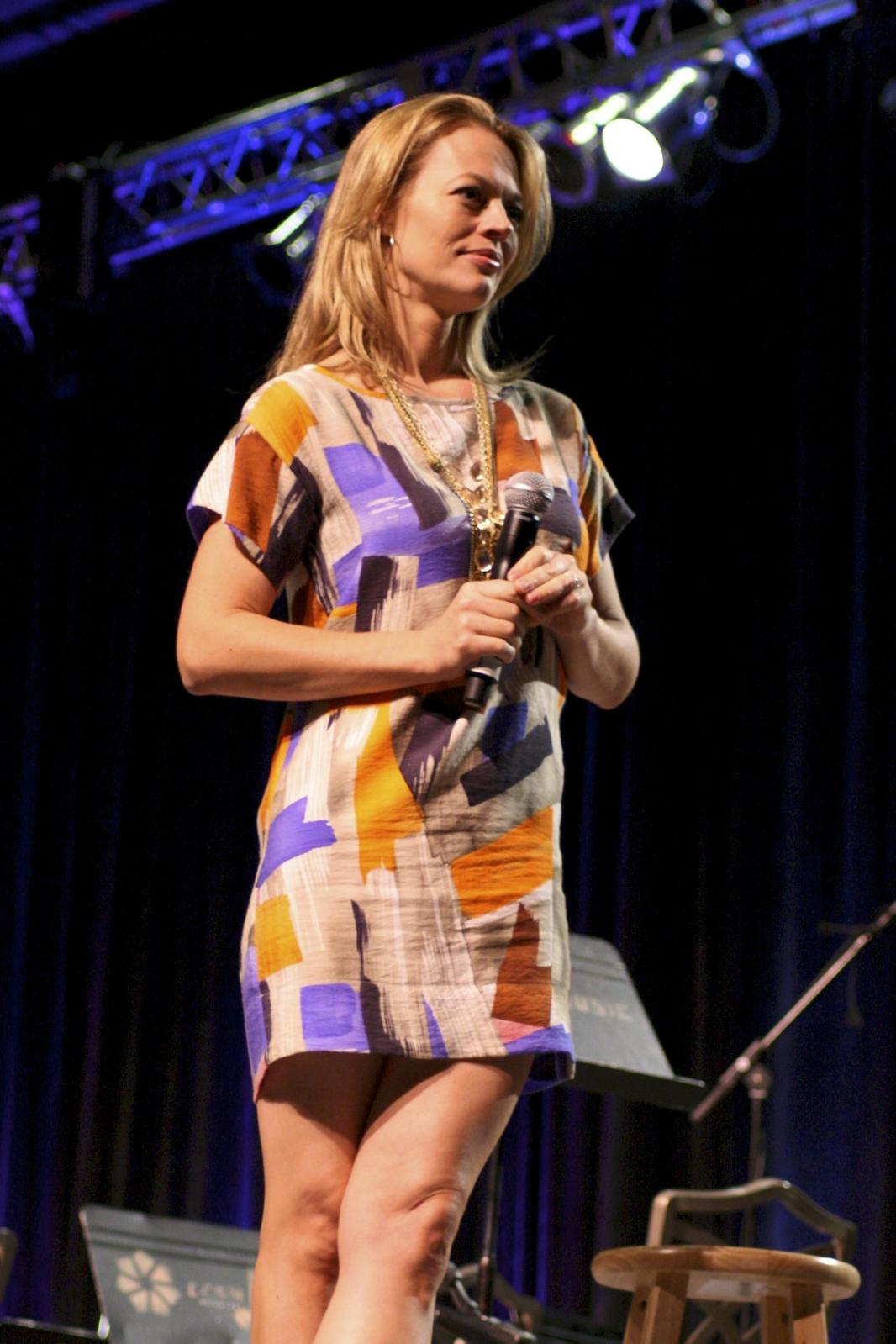
Ryan at the 2010 Las Vegas Star Trek convention in Nevada

In 1990, while dealing blackjack at a charity event, Ryan met investment banker and future Republican political candidate Jack Ryan. They married on June 15, 1991, in Wilmette, Illinois. They have a son. Jeri commuted between Los Angeles and Wilmette during their marriage. They divorced on August 27, 1999. A few years after she joined the Voyager cast, Ryan began dating Star Trek: Voyager producer Brannon Braga. Between February and November 2000, they were stalked by Marlon Estacio Pagtakhan, who was convicted for harassment and threats in May 2001.

When Jack Ryan's campaign for an open United States Senate seat in Illinois began in 2003, the Chicago Tribune newspaper and WLS-TV, the local ABC affiliate, sought to have his records released. Both Jeri and Jack agreed to make public their divorce records, but not their custody records, saying the latter's release could be harmful to their son.

On June 18, 2004, Los Angeles Superior Court Judge Robert Schnider agreed to release the custody files. The decision went against both parents' direct requests and reversed the decision to seal the papers in the child's best interest. It was revealed that six years earlier, Jeri accused Jack of asking her to perform sexual acts with him in public and in sex clubs in New York, New Orleans and Paris. Jeri described one venue as "a bizarre club with cages, whips, and other apparatus hanging from the ceiling." Jack denied the allegations. Although Jeri only made a brief statement, and refused to comment on the matter during the campaign, the disclosure led Jack to withdraw his candidacy. His main opponent, Barack Obama, then won the 2004 United States Senate election in Illinois, flipping the Senate seat from Republican to Democratic.

In interviews, Ryan has said her main hobby is gourmet cooking. While starring in Boston Public, she moonlighted on weekends in the kitchen of the Los Angeles restaurant The House. In 2003, Ryan met French chef Christophe Émé at a chef's charity event. They later began a relationship, and Émé moved in with Ryan and her son in their home in San Fernando Valley. In February 2005, Ryan, a "lifelong Francophile", and Émé opened the restaurant Ortolan on Third Street in Los Angeles, serving French food with a modern interpretation. The two have appeared on Iron Chef America, where Émé and one sous-chef challenged Iron Chef Masaharu Morimoto and his two sous-chefs. The restaurant is seen in Season 2, Episode 26 of Boston Legal as Denny Crane (William Shatner) and Alan Shore (James Spader) discuss the arrival of Courtney Reece (Ryan) at "her favorite restaurant". Hit hard by the Great Recession, the restaurant closed in December 2010.

Ryan and Émé married in the Loire Valley, France, on June 16, 2007. In March 2008, she gave birth to a daughter in Los Angeles.

== Notable awards and nominations ==
Year	Award	Category	Nominated work	Result	Ref
1998	Saturn Awards	Best Genre TV Actress	Star Trek: Voyager	Nominated	
1999	Saturn Awards	Best Genre TV Actress	Star Trek: Voyager	Nominated	
1999	Golden Satellite Award	Best Actress – Drama Series	Star Trek: Voyager	Won	
2000	Saturn Awards	Best Genre TV Supporting Actress	Star Trek: Voyager	Nominated	
2001	Saturn Awards	Best Supporting Actress on Television	Star Trek: Voyager	Won	
2021	Saturn Awards	Best Guest Performance in a Television Series	Star Trek: Picard	Nominated	
2023	Astra TV Awards	Best Supporting Actress in a Streaming Drama Series	Star Trek: Picard	Won	
2024	Saturn Awards	Best Supporting Actress in a Television Series	Star Trek: Picard	Won	
2024	Critics' Choice Super Awards	Best Actress in a Science Fiction/Fantasy Series	Star Trek: Picard	Nominated	

== Filmography ==
=== Film ===
Year	Film	Role	Notes
1999	Men Cry Bullets	Lydia	
2000	The Last Man	Sarah	
2000	Disney's The Kid	Herself	
2000	Dracula 2000	Valerie Sharpe	Alternate title: Wes Craven Presents: Dracula 2000
2003	Down with Love	Gwendolyn	
2010	Mortal Kombat: Rebirth	Sonya Blade	Short film
2019	Devil's Revenge	Susan	
TBA	Unplugged	C.J. Skye	Voice role; in production

=== Television films ===
Year	Film	Role	Notes
1991	Nightmare in Columbia County	Dawn Elizabeth Smith	Alternate title: Victim of Beauty
1992	Flash III: Deadly Nightshade	Felicia Kane	
1992	Just Deserts	Nicole	
1993	In the Line of Duty: Ambush in Waco	Rebecca	
1996	Co-ed Call Girl	Kimberley	
1996	Pier 66	Beth Saunders	
2005	The Commuters	Anne	
2010	Dead Lines	Sophie Fyne	
2010	Secrets in the Walls	Rachel Easton	
2016	Against the Wild: Survive the Serengeti	Jennifer Croft	

=== Television series ===
Year	Show	Role	Notes
1991	Who's the Boss?	Pam	Episode: "The Unsinkable Tony Micelli"
1991	The Flash	Felicia Kane	Episode: "The Deadly Nightshade"
1991	Top of the Heap	Tyler	Episode: "The Marrying Guy"
1991	Nurses	Lisa	Episode: "Mother, Jugs, and Zach"
1991	Reasonable Doubts	Rachel Beckwith	Episode: "Graduation Day"
1993	The Jackie Thomas Show	Pauline Yardley	Episode: "Jackie and the Model"
1993	Matlock: The Fatal Seduction	Carrie Locke	2 episodes
1994	Time Trax	Lauren Sanders	Episode: "Out for Blood"
1995	Murder, She Wrote	Maura	Episode: "Death n' Denial"
1995	Charlie Grace	Claire	Episode: "Designer Knock-Off"
1996	The Client	Jennifer	Episode: "The Morning After"
1996	Melrose Place	Valerie Madison	2 episodes
1996	Diagnosis: Murder	Melissa Farnes	Episode: "Murder by the Book"
1997	Dark Skies	Juliet Stewart	8 episodes
1997–2001	Star Trek: Voyager	Seven of Nine	100 episodes Satellite Award for Best Actress – Television Series Drama; Saturn Award for Best Supporting Actress on Television; Nominated—Saturn Award for Best Actress on Television (1998–1999); Nominated—Saturn Award for Best Supporting Actress on Television
1999	The Sentinel	Alexis Barnes	2 episodes
1999	Dilbert	Seven of Nine alarm clock (voice)	Episode: "The Gift"
2001–2004	Boston Public	Ronnie Cooke	59 episodes
2004–2011	Two and a Half Men	Sherri	3 episodes
2005	The O.C.	Charlotte Morgan	7 episodes
2006	Boston Legal	Courtney Reese	2 episodes
2006–2009	Iron Chef America	Herself	2 episodes
2006–2008	Shark	Jessica Devlin	34 episodes
2009	Law & Order: Special Victims Unit	Patrice Larue	3 episodes
2009–2011	Leverage	Tara Cole	8 episodes
2010	Psych	Dr. Kim Phoenix	Episode: "The Head, the Tail, the Whole Damn Episode"
2011	Law & Order: Criminal Intent	Naomi Halloran	Episode: "Boots on the Ground"
2011	Mortal Kombat: Legacy	Sonya Blade	2 episodes
2011–2012	Warehouse 13	Major Amanda Lattimer	2 episodes
2011–2013	Body of Proof	Kate Murphy	42 episodes
2014–2017	Major Crimes	Linda Rothman	3 episodes
2014	Helix	Constance Sutton	2 episodes
2015	NCIS	Rebecca Chase	Episode: "Check"
2015	Arrow	Jessica Danforth	Episode: "The Candidate"
2016–2019	Bosch	Veronica Allen	12 episodes
2020–2023	Star Trek: Picard	Seven of Nine	25 episodes Astra TV Award for Best Supporting Actress in a Streaming Drama Series; Saturn Award for Best Supporting Actress on Television; Nominated—Critics' Choice Super Award for Best Actress in a Science Fiction/Fantasy Series; Nominated—Saturn Award for Best Guest Starring Role on Television
2020	The Ready Room	Herself	2 episodes
2020	MacGyver	Gwendolyn Hayes	3 episodes
2023	Dark Winds	Rosemary Vines	4 episodes
2025	Leverage: Redemption	Tara Cole	Episode: "The Grand Complication Job"
2026	Tracker	Dr. Serena Jukic	2 Episodes: "Chrono Stasis" and "The Best Ones"
2026	Criminal Minds Evolution	Susan Cartright	Episode "Now and Then"

=== Video games ===
Year	Title	Role	Notes
2001	Star Trek: Voyager – Elite Force	Seven of Nine	Voice role (in patch 1.2 and the Expansion Pack)
2014, 2020	Star Trek Online	Seven of Nine	Voice role

Preceded by Dawn Spicuzza	Miss Illinois; 1989	Succeeded by Marjorie Vincent
