= List of ethnic religions =

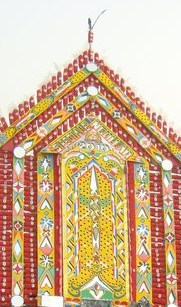
The symbol of the Ndut initiation rite in Serer religion

Ethnic religions (also "indigenous religions" or "ethnoreligions") are generally defined as religions which are related to a particular ethnic group (ethnoreligious group), and often seen as a defining part of that ethnicity's culture, language, and customs (social norms, conventions, traditions). In an ethnic religion, the ethnic group and its beliefs system cannot be easily separated. Oftentimes an ethnic religion's doctrine only pertains or is directed to that group. Many modern ethnic religions accept converts, but do not seek converts, as opposed to universal religions, which are open to all peoples and actively pursue and accept converts.

== Africa ==
=== North Africa ===
- Ancient Egyptian religion (Ancient Egyptians)
- Berber religion (Berbers of northern Africa)
- Punic religion (Phoenicans of Carthage)
- Coptic Christianity (Coptic Egyptians)

=== Sub-Saharan Africa ===
- Abwoi religion (Inhabitants of central Nigerian plateau)
- Akan religion (Akans of the Gold Coast)
- Bori religion (Hausa people of Northern Nigeria)
- Dinka religion (Dinka people of South Sudan)
- Dogon religion (Dogon people of Mali)
- Edo traditional religion (Edo people of Edo State)
- Inam (Ibibio people of Southern Nigeria)
- Bantu religion (Bantu of Central/Southern Africa)
- Malagasy religion (People of Madagascar)
- Mbuti religion (Mbuti of Congo and central Sudan)
- Odinani (Igbo of southeastern Nigeria)
- Serer religion (Serer of Senegal and northern West Africa)
- Vodun (Fon and Ewe of Benin and southwestern Nigeria)
- Nuer religion (Nuer people of South Sudan)
- Maasai religion (Maasai people of Kenya)
- Sidama mythology (Sidama people of Ethiopia)
- Waaqeffanna (Oromo people of Ethiopia and Kenya)
- Yoruba religion (Yoruba of southwestern Nigeria and southern Benin)
- San religion (San people of Southern Africa)

== Asia ==
=== Austroasiatic ===
- Sari Dharam (Santal Tribes)
- Ka Niam Khasi (Khasis of Meghalaya)
- Muong ethnic religion (Muong people of Vietnam)
- Sarnaism (Santal Tribes of India)
- Vietnamese folk religion (Vietnamese)
- Malaysian folk religion (Negrito)

=== Austronesian ===
- Aluk Todolo (Torajans)
- Anitism (Indigenous peoples of the Philippines)
- Fanomba Adu (Nias)
- Kaharingan (Dayaks)
- Kan Imam San (Chams)
- Kejawèn (Javanese)
- Marapu (Sumba)
- Parmalim (Bataks)
- Sunda Wiwitan (Sundanese)
- Tolotang (Bugis)
- Tonaas Walian (Minahasans)
- Malaysian Folk (Proto Malay)
- Momolianism (Kadazan Dusun and Murut)

=== Indo-European ===
- Armenian religion (Armenians)
- Proto-Indo-Iranian paganism

==== Anatolian ====
- Hittite religion (Hittites of Anatolia)
- Luwian religion (Luwians of Anatolia)
- Lydian religion (Lydians)
- Phrygian religion (Phrygians of Anatolia)

==== Indo-Aryan ====
- Hinduism (within the Indian subcontinent population)
- Jainism (predominantly within the Indian subcontinent)
- Kalash religion (Kalash people of Kalasha Valleys in Pakistan)
- Sikhism (among Sikhs and Punjabis in Indian subcontinent and across the world through Sikh diaspora)

==== Iranian religions ====
- Assianism / Uatsdin (Ossetians)
- Scythian religion (Scythians)
- Shabakism (Shabaks in Iraq)
- Yarsanism (Kurds of northern Iraq and western Iran)
- Yazidism

=== Semitic ===
- Alawism (Alawite Muslims in Syria)
- Druze
- Ebla religion (Eblaites)
- Judaism (Jews)
- Mandaeism (Mandaeans of southern Mesopotamia)
- Maronite Christianity (Maronites of Lebanon)
- Samaritanism (Samaritans)

=== Sino-Tibetan ===
- Chinese folk religion, Confucianism (Han Chinese)
- Kirat Mundhum (Kirat of the south-western flanks of the Himalayas)
- Mizo religion (Mizo people of Mizoram)
- Qiang folk religion (Qiang people)
- Sanamahism (Meitei of northeastern India)

==== Tibeto-Burman ====
- Bathouism (Boro people of India)
- Bimoism (Yi people)
- Bon (Tibetans)
- Burmese folk religion (Bamar people)
- Daba (Na of southern China)
- Dongba (Nakhi from the foothills of the Himalayas)
- Donyi-Polo (Arunachali of northeastern India)

=== Other ===
- Ainu religion (Ainu people)
- Ryukyuan religion, Ijun (Ryukyuans of the Ryukyu Islands near Taiwan)
- Shinto (Yamato (Japanese))
- Musok (Koreans)
- Koyapunem (Gondi people)
- Tai folk religion (Tai peoples of Mainland Southeast Asia)
  - Ahom religion (Ahom people of north-east India)
  - Moism (Zhuang people)
- Siberian Shamanism (Indigenous peoples of Siberia)
  - Manchu shamanism (Manchu people)
- Tengrism (Turkic peoples and Mongolic peoples)

=== Historical religions ===
- Dravidian folk religion (Dravidian peoples)
- Ancient Mesopotamian religion (Assyria, Sumer, Babylonia and Akkad)
- Elam religion (Elamites)
- Hattian religion (Hattians of Anatolia)
- Hurrian religion (Hurrians)
- Yahwism (ancient Israelites)

== Americas ==
- Acoma Pueblo religion (Puebloans)
- Anishinaabe traditional beliefs (Anishinaabe)
- Aztec religion (Aztec people of the Aztec Empire)
- Blackfoot religion (Blackfoot Confederacy)
- Brujeria (Latin Americans/Mestizos)
- Candomblé (Afro-Brazilians)
- Cherokee religion (Cherokee people of Cherokee Nation)
- Choctaw religion (Choctaw people of the Choctaw Nation, part of the United States)
- Guarani religion, San La Muerte worship in Paraguay and north of Argentina
- Haitian Vodou (Haitian people)
- Haudenosaunee religion (Inhabitants of the Haudenosaunee Confederacy)
- Hoodoo (African Americans)
- Inca Religion (Inhabitants of the Inca Empire)
- Inuit religion (Inuit of North America and Greenland)
- Lakota religion (Lakota people)
- Mapuche religion (Mapuche people of Chile)
- Maya religion (Maya; Guatemalans)
- Miskito religion (Miskito people of Central America)
- Molokane, Spiritual Christians from Russia
- Muisca religion (Muisca people and Colombian Mestizos)
- Muzo religion Muzo people
- Navajo religion (Navajo people)
- Obeah (Afro-Caribbean people)
- Olmec religion (Olmecs)
- Purépecha religion (Purépecha people of the Purépecha Empire)
- Rastafari (Jamaicans)
- Umbanda (Afro-Brazilians and Afro-Uruguayans)
- Santa Muerte worship (Mestizo/Mexicans and Mexican-Americans)
- Southeastern Ceremonial Complex (Mississippian culture)
- Taíno religion (Taíno)
- Tecumseh's religion (Inhabitants of the Tecumseh's confederacy)
- Teotihuacan religion (Inhabitants of Teotihuacan)
- Totonac religion (Totonac people)
- Wayuu religion (Wayuu people)
- Yupik religion (Yupik of Alaska and Eastern Russia)
- Zapotec religion (Zapotec peoples of the Zapotec civilisation)

== Europe ==
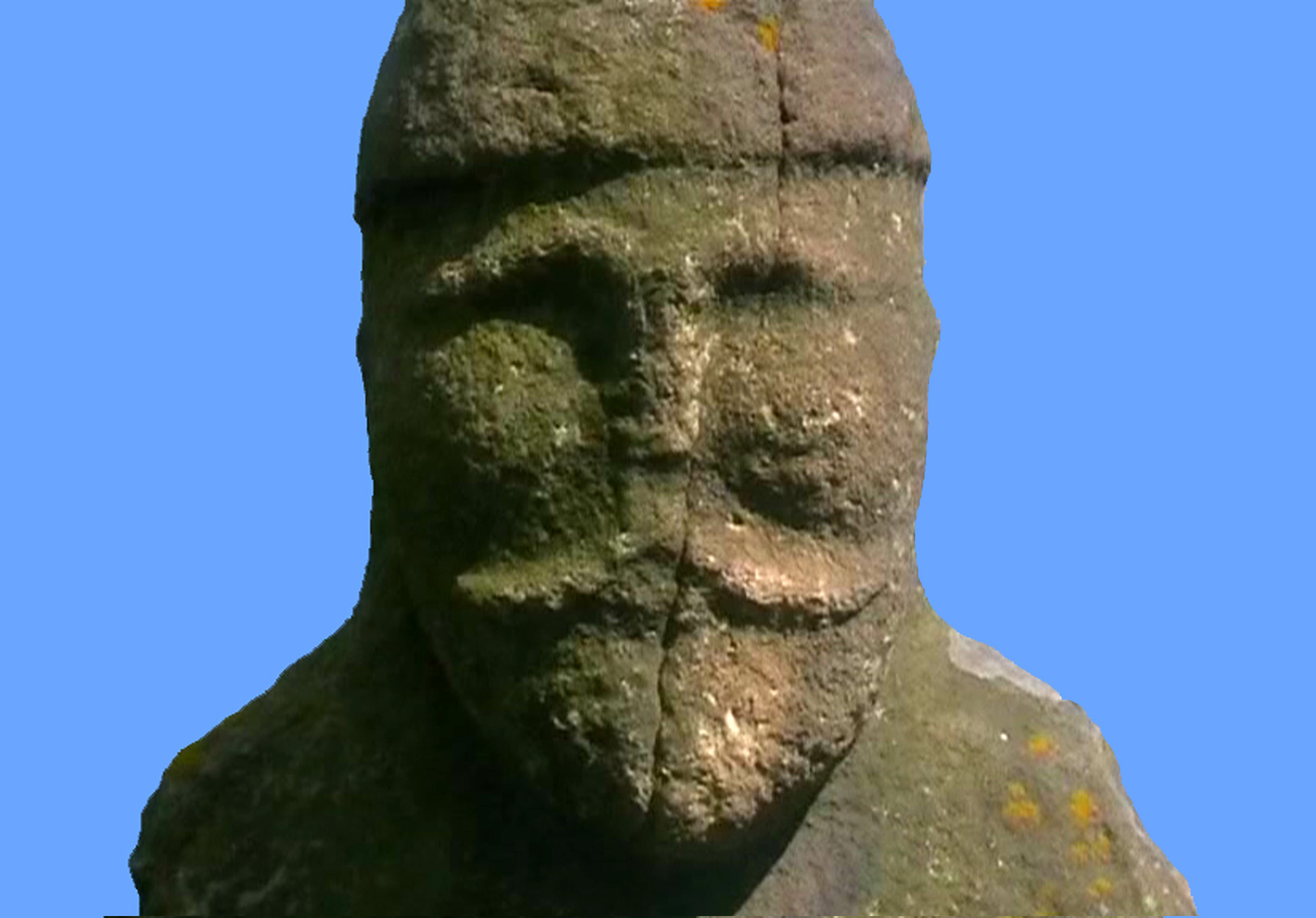
Cuman statue, 11th century, Ukraine

- Albanian religion (Albanians)
- Anglo-Saxon paganism (Anglo-Saxons of England)
- Baltic paganism (Lithuanians, Latvians and Baltic Prussians)
- Basque religion (Basques of the western end of the Pyrenees)
- Celtic paganism (Celtic peoples and tribes (Ancient Britons, Cumbrians, Gaels, Manx, Picts, Gallaeci, Gauls, Belgae, etc.) of what is now Great Britain, Ireland, France, Belgium, Iberia, Asia Minor, and other parts of Europe)
- Circassian paganism (Circassians of Circassia)
- Dacian religion (Dacians of Dacia)
- Dievturība (Latvians)
- Georgian religion (pre-Christian Colchis of the southern Caucasus)
- Estonian religion (Estonians of Estonia)
- Etruscan religion (Etruscans of the central Italian peninsula)
- Finnish paganism (Finns and Karelians)
- Germanic paganism (Germanic peoples and tribes of Germania)
- Greek polytheism (pre-Christian Greeks)
- Illyrian religion (Illyrians of Illyria)
- Mari religion (Mari people)
- Minoan religion (Minoan civilization)
- Mordvin Native Religion (Mordvins of Mordovia)
- Norse religion (Norsemen and Vikings of Scandinavia)
- Roman polytheism (pre-Christian Romans of the Roman Empire)
- Sámi religion (Sami people of Fennoscandia)
- Samnite religion (Samnites of Samnium)
- Slavic paganism (Early Slavs/Slavs) of Eastern and Southeastern Europe)
- Tengrism (Turks)
- Thracian religion (Thracians of Odrysian kingdom)
- Vainakh religion (Nakhs of the Caucasus)

== Oceania ==
- Indigenous Australian religion
- Modekngei (Palauan people)
- Fijian ancient religion
- Kanak traditional beliefs
- Papuan religion
  - Dumo spirituality
  - Fore traditional beliefs
  - Kaluli religion
  - Korowai religion
  - Trobriand traditional beliefs
  - Urapmin traditional beliefs
- Micronesian religion
  - Carolinian religion
  - Chamorro religion
  - Chuukese religion
  - Nauruan indigenous religion
- Polynesian narrative
  - Cook Islands narrative
  - Hawaiian religion
  - Mangarevan narrative
  - Māori religion (Māori people)
  - Niuean narrative
  - Rapa Nui narrative
  - Samoan narrative
  - Tahitian narrative
  - Tongan narrative
  - Tuvaluan narrative

== See also ==
- Ethnoreligious group
- Völkisch movement
- Folk religion
- List of modern pagan movements
- List of religions and spiritual traditions
- Modern paganism
- Shamanism
- Three teachings
