= Dongba Manuscripts =

Classic Chinese texts

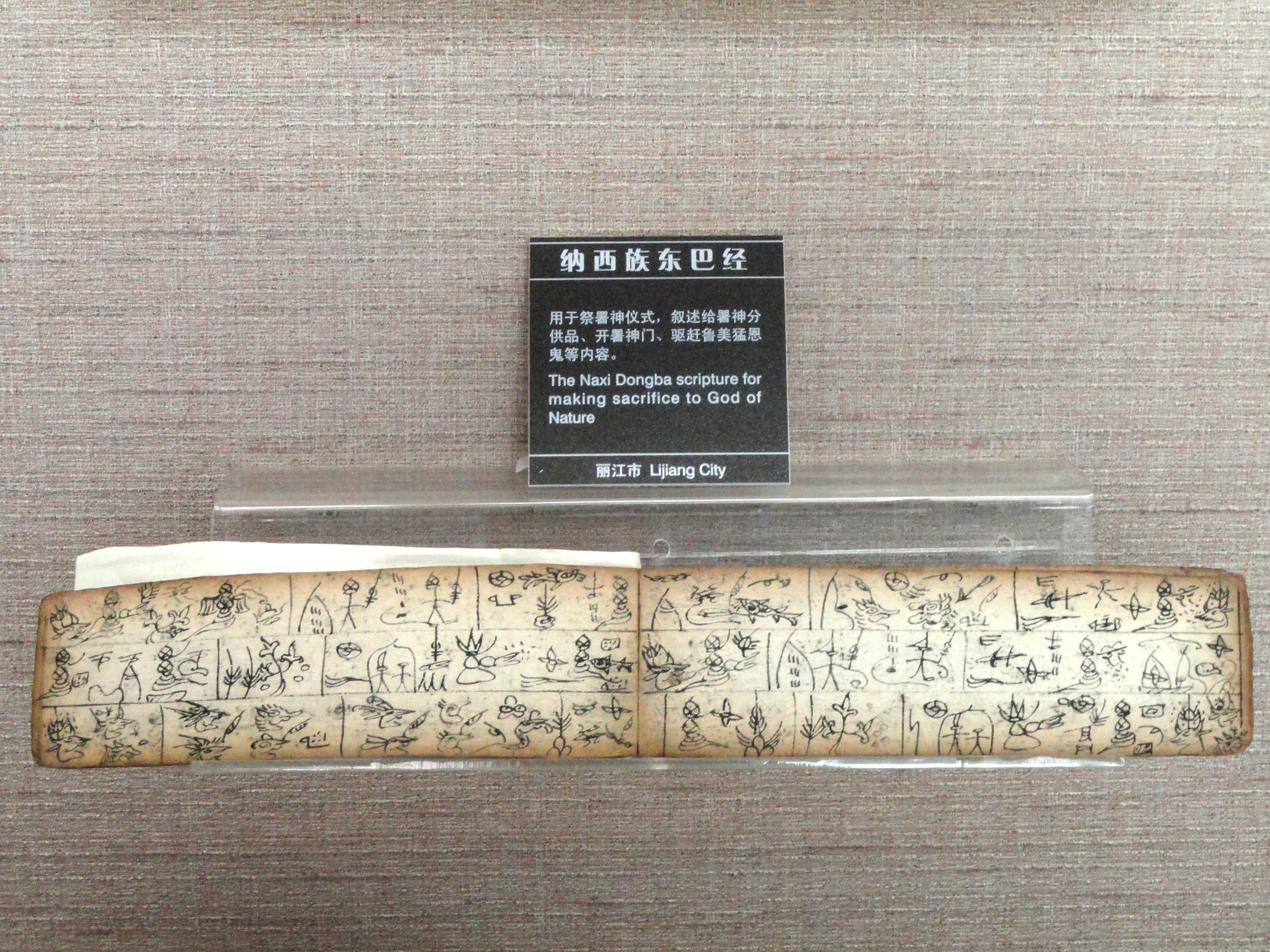
One excerpt from the Dongba Manuscript (photo taken at Yunnan Nantionalities Museum)

The Dongba Manuscript is an important classic of Dongba religion. It was compiled by the ancient Naxi priests, also called dongba, meaning 'instructor', in Naxi language, with an estimated total of 20,000 volumes.

== Naxi script ==
The Dongba Manuscript is the main source for studying the Naxi writing system. The Naxi writing system, consisting of both pictographic Dongba symbols and phonographic Geba script, is unique in that it exists in a buffering state of transition from drawings to formal writing, resulting in an intriguing hybrid of both, rather than solely pictographic or phonographic as some scholars may suggest. Given its close relationship with pictorial representation, the characters exhibit remarkable flexibility in their forms, including variations such as tilting, inversion, fragmentation, splitting, reduction, extension, and rotation, as well as modifications through dots, lines, colors, and scaling. Around 1,231 volumes of Dongba manuscripts were collected by Chinese anthropologist Li Lincan in the Naxi area. These scriptures laid the crucial foundation for his publication of Naxi Pictographic Dictionary in 1944 and Naxi Phonetic Dictionary the following year.

According to the Naxi legends recorded in the manuscripts, phonetic Geba characters first came into existence but proved difficult to mark down. The invention of Dongba symbols was later inspired by portraying common objects like stones and wood. This view is in accordance with Rock (1937). Nevertheless, some contradicting evidence exists, with the most prominent being the word geba, meaning 'pupil', used to denote phonograms. Li (2001) suggests that this indicates the subordinate status of Geba, as the humble younger script, as opposed to Dongba, as the older 'instructor' script. The argument that Geba should be a direct descendant of Dongba is also supported by Zhang and Huang (2018). This view in fact posits challenge to the European linguistic tradition which is centered around the study of phonetic realities, conforming Swiss linguist and often considered the founder of structural linguistics Ferdinand de Saussure's claim that "spoken forms alone makes language".

Other than the Dongba manuscript, the direct reference to the Naxi language made by the Naxi people can only be found in Mushi Huanpu (Chinese: "木氏宦谱", literally "Genealogy Book of Mu family"), which belongs to the Naxi headmen, or tusi, family. It states that a legendary ancestor named Cong who learned all scripts (Chinese: "旁通百蛮各家诸书", literally "knows a hundred barbarian and other scripts") of early 13th century, during the period of the Song dynasty, invented their own script. Li speculates (2001) that the script mentioned was Dongba. Another reference comes from a Han Chinese scholar who lived during the period of Qianlong Emperor. He described the language as the following:

Mostly in pictographs, people are drawn as people, objects are drawn as objects, and this serves as writing.

— Yu Qingyuan, Chronicles of Weixi

An anecdote is also noted in Li's dictionary, which states that legend has it that in late Qing dynasty the Naxi language used to be ridiculed by local Chinese literates as the hideous script (Chinese: "牛头马面", literally "cow-headed and horse-faced") due to its very much pictographic nature. A grand priest named He Wenyu, who could no longer stand this kind of humiliation, invented the Geba symbols instead.

== Textual components ==
Although it may be seen as traditionally composed in ritual literature (Duncan 2023), its content in fact encompasses a wide range of topics, including Naxi cultural traditions, language and writing, astronomy, geography, philosophy, etc. In actual texts, there is no fixed word order of the symbols, and they are often arranged in intricate, ideographic collages. To further complicate the matter, one graph can correspond to a single word, or sometimes even a whole sentence, as some symbols are written as silent markers, while many others are read and not written. Subsequently, there is generally a looser relationship between the written and the spoken symbols than an average reader is probably used to.

An example of a word corresponding to one sentence is as follows:

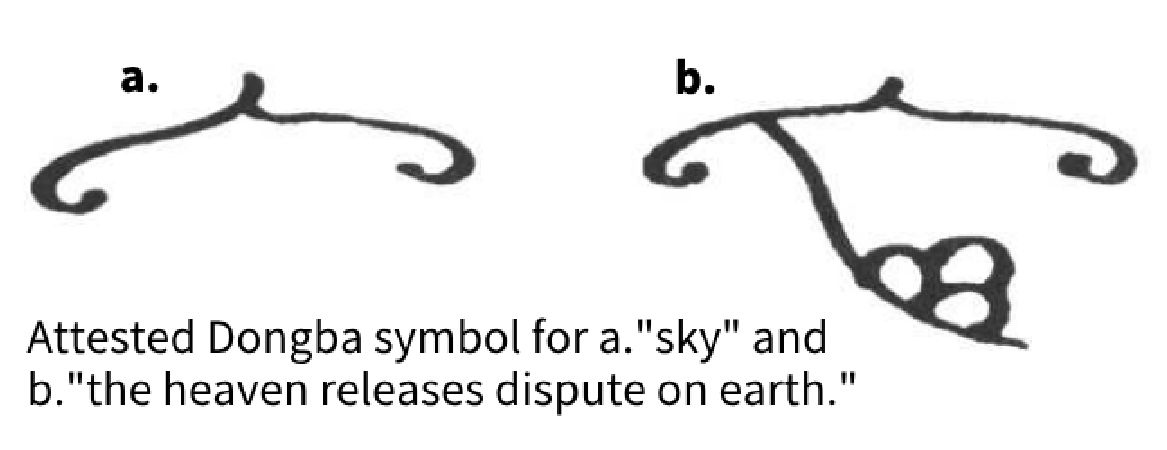
[mɯ^{33}] versus [mɯ^{33}nɯ^{33}dʐv^{33}rv^{33}kwɛ^{55}]

[mɯ^{33}] which means "sky".

[mɯ^{33}nɯ^{33}dʐv^{33}rv^{33}kwɛ^{55}] which means "the heaven (sky) releases dispute (on earth)".

Note that the numbers in superscript indicate the tone of the previous syllable.

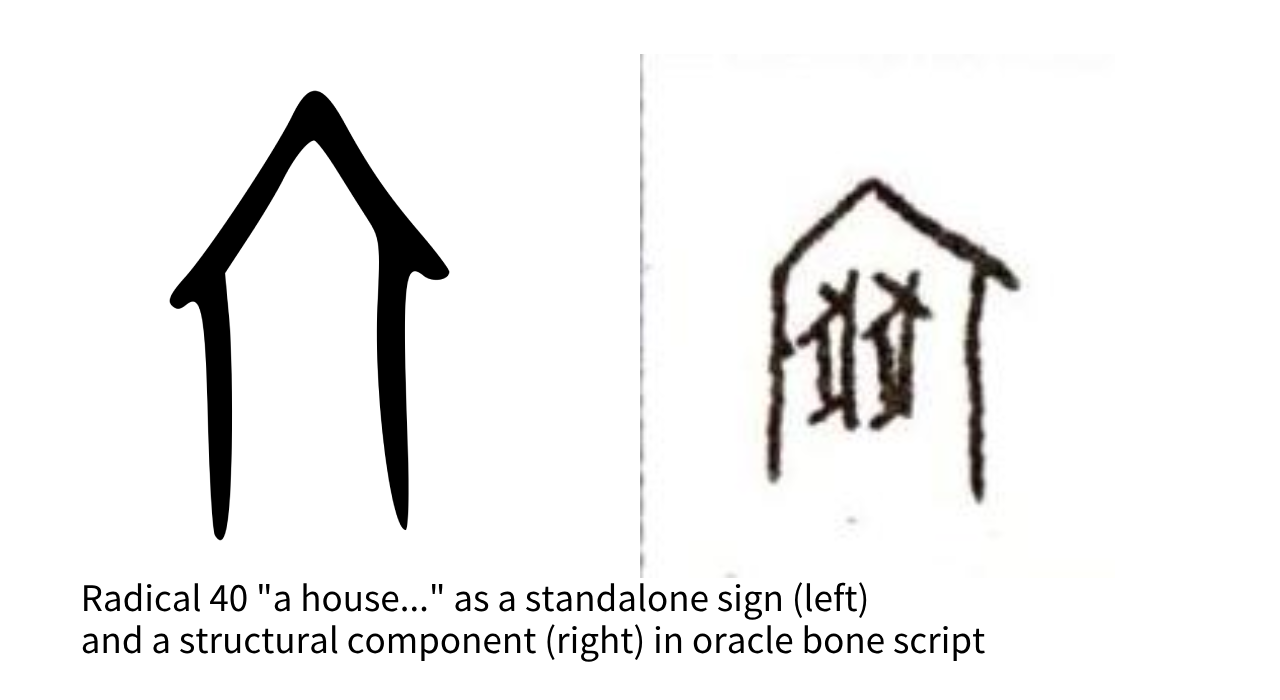
宀 versus 家 in oracle bone script.

From the perspective of character formation, the logographic Dongba script exhibits clear similarities with Chinese characters. Notably, a semantically complete character can also function as a radical, or pseudo-radical in the case of Dongba. For instance, consider the Chinese radical 宀, denoting "a house with a hall and chambers", it is then used as a structural component to form a series of words, such 家 "home", 向 "towards", 灾 "trouble", and 宁 "peace". Compare this with Naxi word "sky" and "the heaven (sky) releases dispute (on earth)", the compositional similarity is evident.

== See also ==
- Dongba symbols
- Li Lincan (in Chinese)
- Joseph Rock
- Youmi script
