= Lamu Gatusa =

Lamu Gatusa (Gaofeng Shi) is an associate professor at the Yunnan Academy of Social Sciences, in Kunming, Yunnan, China. He is also a writer, and a three-time winner of China's Minority People Literature Award.

His studies have focused on his own ethnic group, the Mosuo, and especially their folk song traditions. In the early 1990s, carrying a large, old Japanese tape recorder, he went into the Mosuo mountain villages to collect folksongs and published the only book about Mosuo folk songs in China. In 1997 he finished the translation of a shaman's recitation of the entire oral history of the Mosuo people, which it took him two months to record. In 1999, he published a book called "Mosuo Daba Culture," in which he collected and translated important oral literature of Mosuo indigenous religion Daba. In recent years, Lamu's works have shifted towards critiquing the tourism and modernization of Mosuo culture. He has published the article "Mosuo People Do Not Live in the Western Exotic Fascination" and nine other articles in academic journals.

Lamu has also collaborated with TV programs or ethnographic documentaries on Mosuo culture: "The Story of the Kingdom of Women", "Stories of Shangerila", "The Path to Heaven" and "Sun Rises, and Sun Sets."

He is a member of the Chinese Writers' Union and the Chinese Minority Nationalities Writer's Union; and is a co-founder of the Lugu Lake Mosuo Cultural Development Association, a non-profit organization dedicated to both preserving and increasing awareness of the Mosuo culture.
