= Dongba symbols =

Naxi pictographic writing system

Dongba
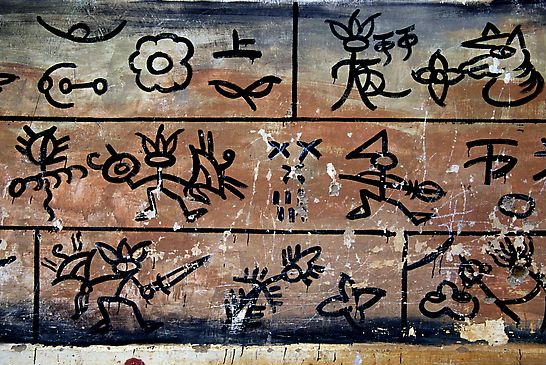
- Script type: Pictographic
- Period: At least 30 CE to the present
- Direction: Left-to-right
- Languages: Naxi language

ISO 15924
- ISO 15924: Nkdb (085), Naxi Dongba (na²¹ɕi³³ to³³ba²¹, Nakhi Tomba)

The Dongba, Tomba or Tompa or Mo-so symbols are a system of pictographic glyphs used by the ²dto¹mba (Bon priests) of the Naxi people in southern China. In the Naxi language it is called ²ss ³dgyu 'wood records' or ²lv ³dgyu 'stone records'. The first artifacts with this script on them originate from approximately 30 CE.

The glyphs may be used as rebuses for abstract words which do not have glyphs. Dongba is largely a mnemonic system, and cannot by itself represent the Naxi language; different authors may use the same glyphs with different meanings, and it may be supplemented with the geba syllabary for clarification.

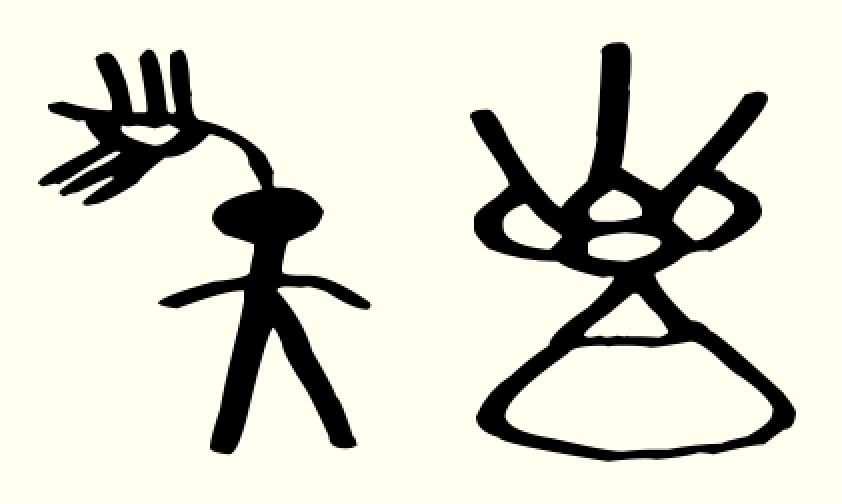
The logograms Naxi and Tomba in Naxi Dongba characters

== Origin and development ==
Facing pages of a Naxi manuscript, displaying both pictographic dongba and smaller syllabic geba
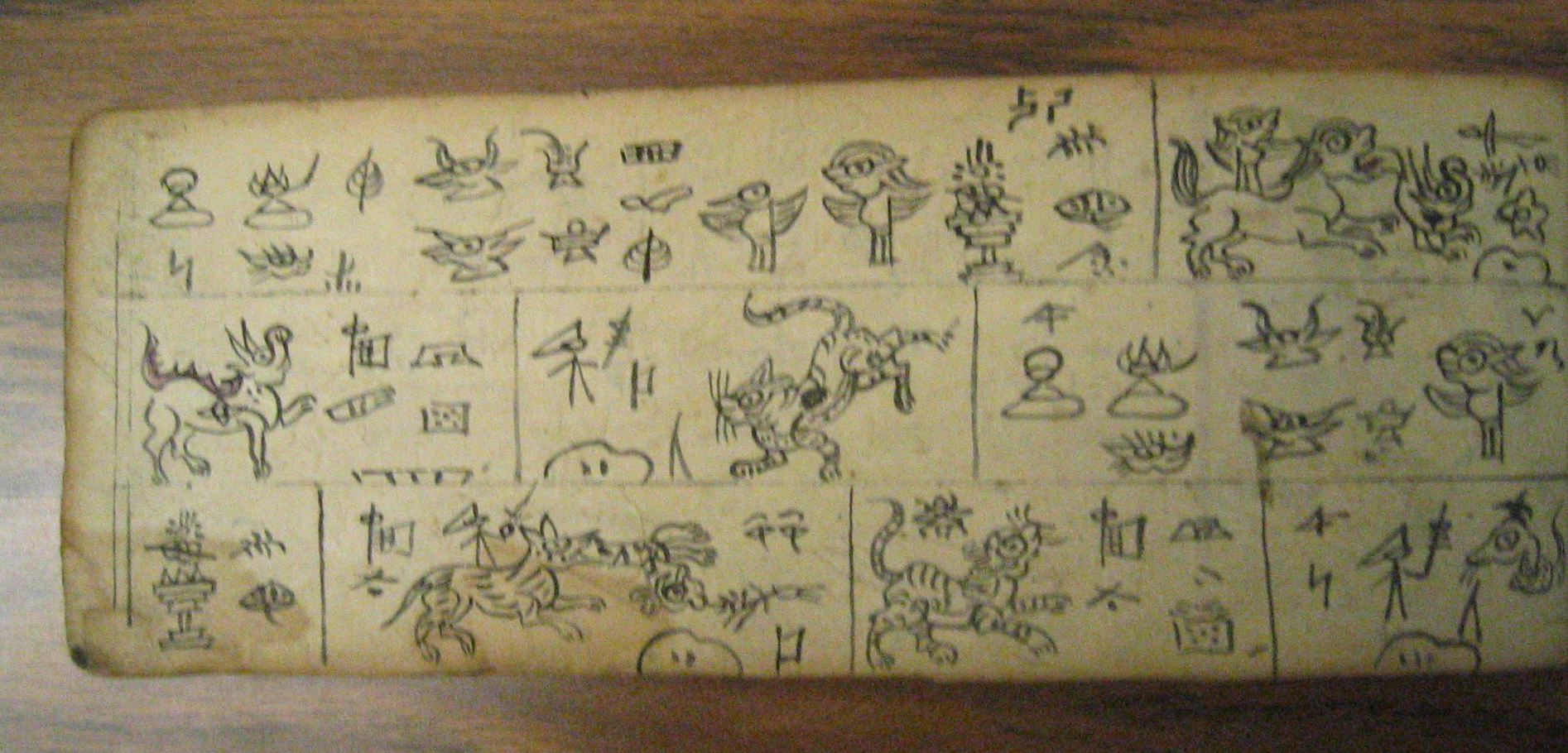

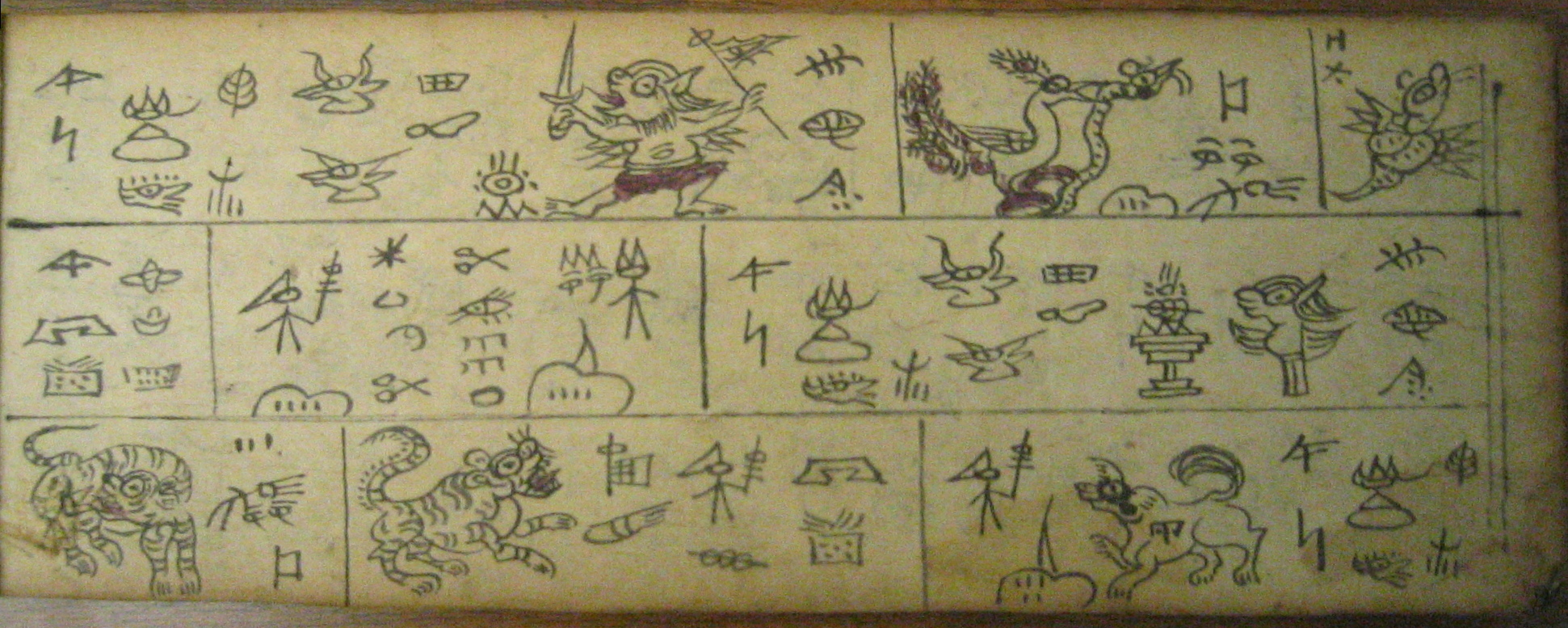

The Dongba script appears to be an independent ancient writing system, though presumably it was created in the environment of older scripts. According to Dongba religious fables, the Dongba script was created by the founder of the Bön religious tradition of Tibet, Tönpa Shenrab (Tibetan: ston pa gshen rab) or Shenrab Miwo (Tibetan: gshen rab mi bo), while traditional Naxi genealogies attribute the script to a 13th-century king named Móubǎo Āzōng. From Chinese historical documents, it is clear that Dongba was used as early as the 7th century, during the early Tang dynasty. By the Song dynasty in the 10th century, Dongba was widely used by the Naxi people. It continues to be used in certain areas; thus, it is the only pictographic writing system in the world still actively maintained.

Chinese historical documents referred to Naxi 納西 as Mosuo or Moso (麽些 mósuò, "tiny little"). Dongba means Priest.

After the conclusion of the Chinese Communist Revolution in 1949, the use of Dongba was discouraged.

In 1957, the Chinese government implemented a Latin-based phonographic writing system for Naxi.

During the Cultural Revolution, thousands of manuscripts were destroyed. Paper and cloth writings were boiled into construction paste for building houses. About half of the Dongba manuscripts that survive today had been taken from China to the United States, Germany and Spain. Among those held in the United States are the 598 volumes at the Harvard–Yenching Library; the "double red" manuscripts in that collection have been traced to Xiachangshui village in Yulong County, Yunnan, and to the lineage of the Qing-dynasty priest Mu Zhi.

Today Dongba is nearly extinct, and the Chinese government is trying to revive it in an attempt to preserve Naxi culture.

== Usage ==
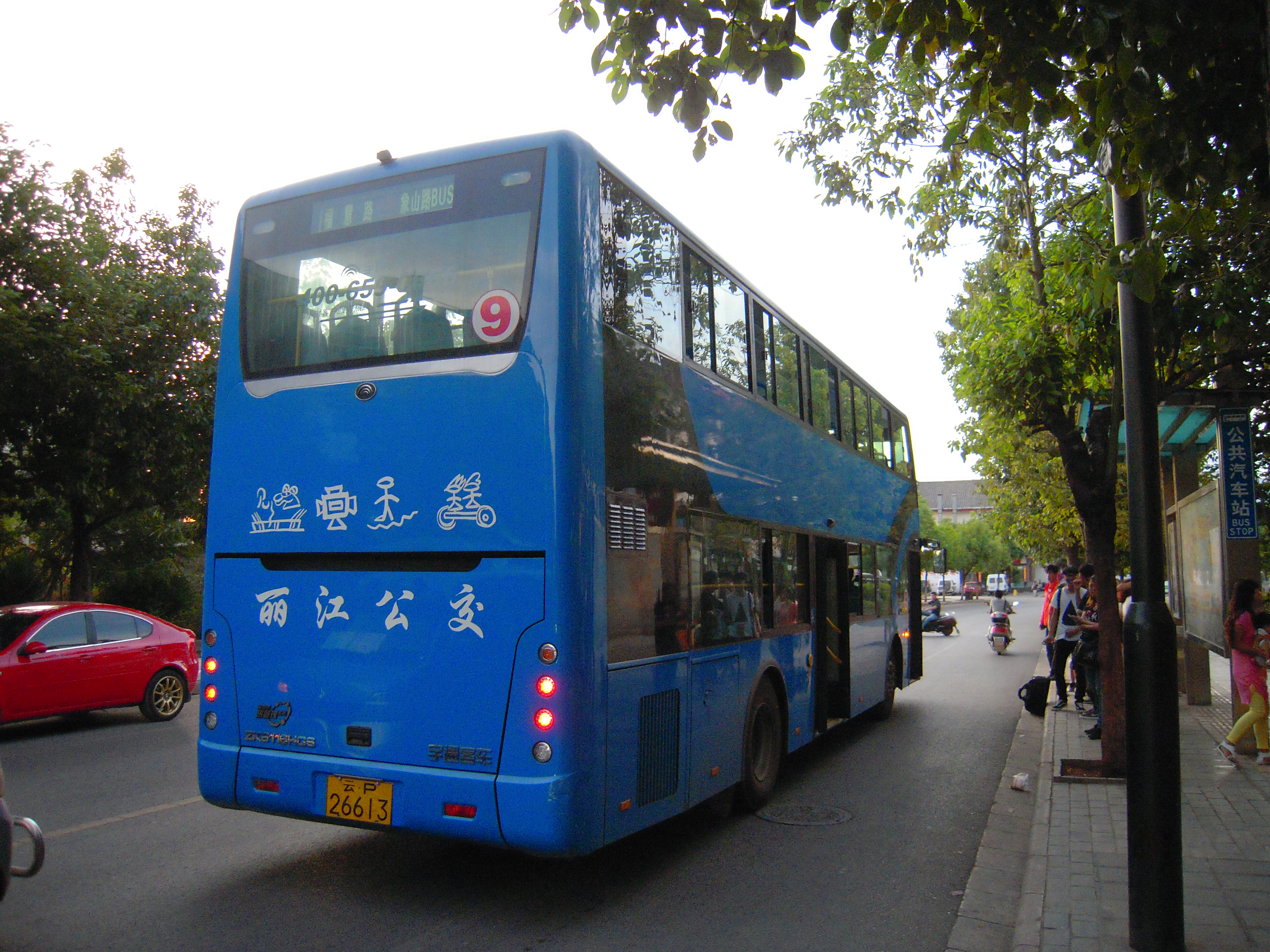
Dongba symbols are printed on buses in Lijiang.

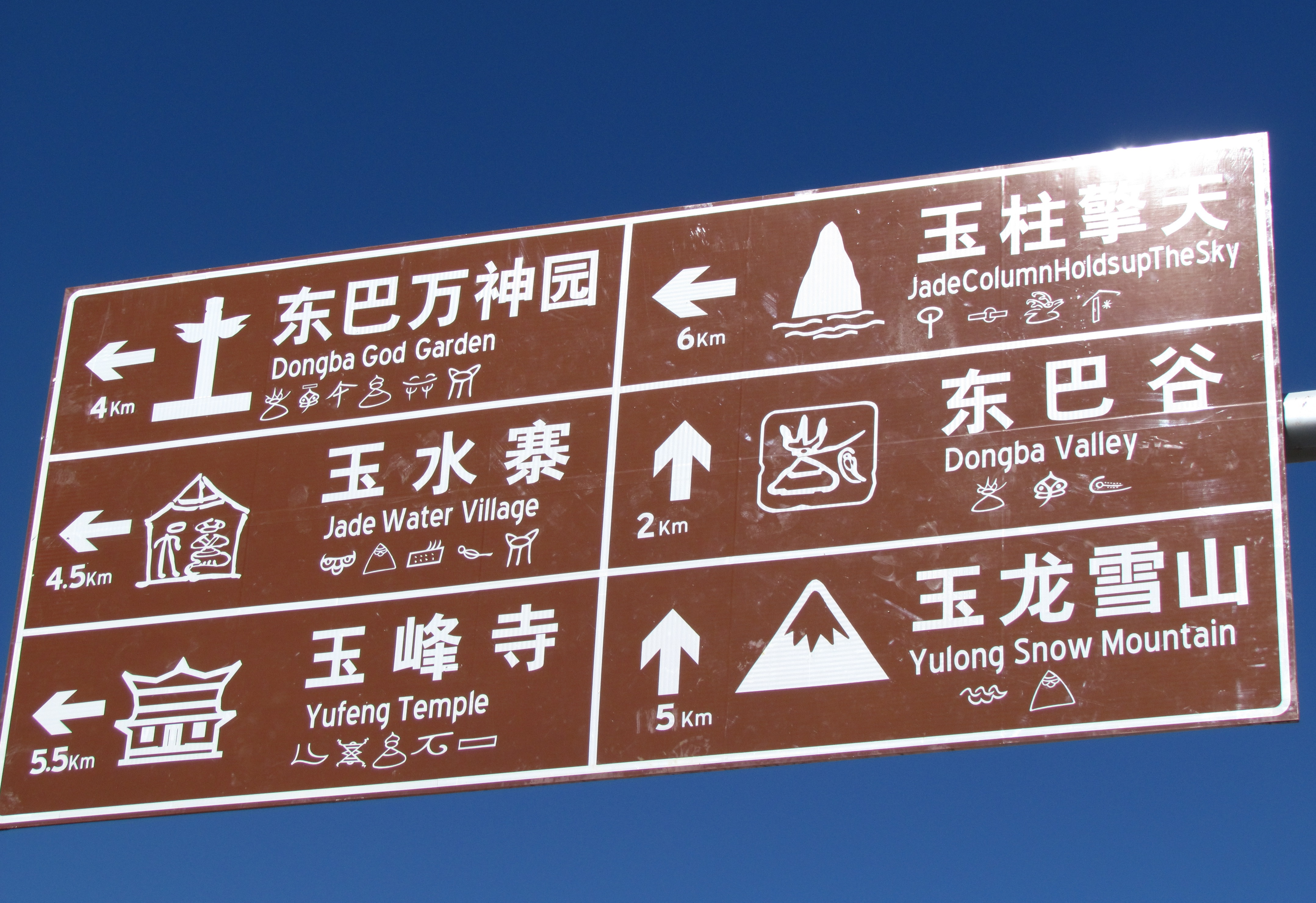
Sign with text in Chinese, English and Dongba in Lijiang

The script was originally used as a prompt for the recitation of ritual texts. For inventories, contracts, and letters, the geba script was used. Milnor concludes it is "unlikely that it [the Dongba script] would make the minor developmental leap to becoming a full-blown writing system. It arose a number of centuries ago to serve a particular ritual purpose. As its purpose need not expand to the realm of daily use among non-religious specialists—after all, literate Naxi today, as in the past, write in Chinese—at most it will presumably but continue to fulfill the needs of demon exorcism, amusing tourists and the like."

The script is also present in modern settings, especially in the Ancient City of Lijiang, where tourists may see Dongba used alongside Chinese and English on business signs and public spaces. This usage emphasizes its role as a cultural symbol that represents the Naxi people's heritage.

Today, Dongba continues to be used in religious contexts, such as ceremonial chants and rituals, while also appearing in artistic and commercial forms. Dongba symbols are incorporated into local crafts, souvenirs, and artwork, providing a visual link to Naxi cultural identity. This integration supports its visibility and contributes to local cultural tourism.

== Structure and form ==
Dongba is both pictographic and ideographic. There are about a thousand glyphs, but this number is fluid as new glyphs are coined. Each glyph in the Dongba script can have multiple meanings or serve various functions depending on its context. For example, a single pictogram could represent an object, an idea, or even a sequence of actions. This inherent ambiguity allows for creativity and adaptability but also means that texts are often personalized by the author’s unique use of symbols.

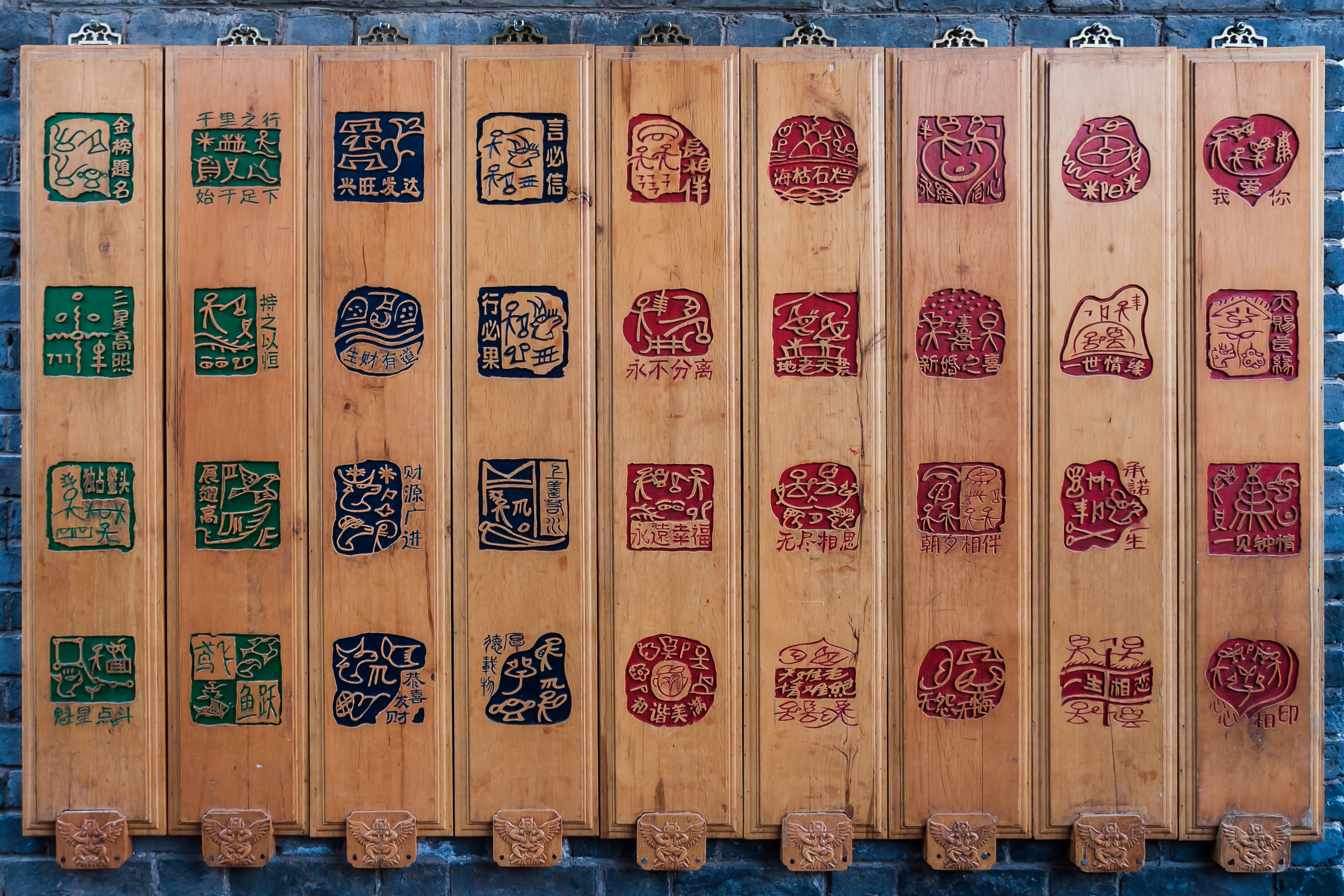
Dongba characters combined with simplified Chinese characters

Priests drew detailed pictures to record information, and illustrations were simplified and conventionalized to represent not only material objects but also abstract ideas. Glyphs are often compounded to convey the idea of a particular word. Generally, as a mnemonic, only keywords are written; a single pictograph can be recited as different phrases or an entire sentence.

Examples of Dongba rebus include using a picture of two eyes (myə^{3}) to represent fate (myə3), a rice bowl (food; xa^{2}) for 'sleep' (xa^{2}), and a picture of a goral (se^{3}) stands in for an aspectual particle. It has two variants ma˧ lɯ˥ ma˧ sa˧ (玛里玛莎文) and ʐər˧ dy˨˩/ʐər˧ k’o˧ (阮坷文).

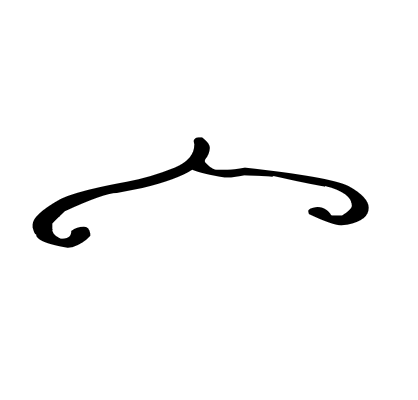

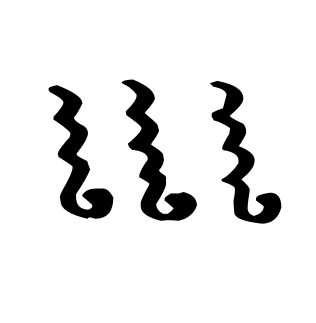

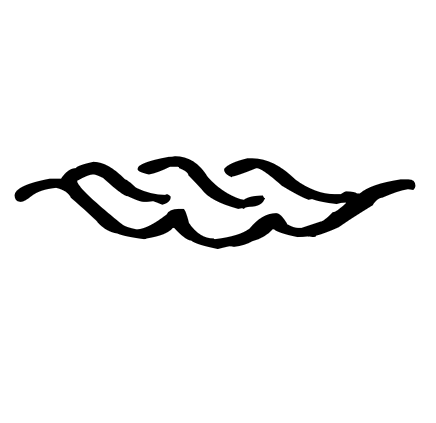

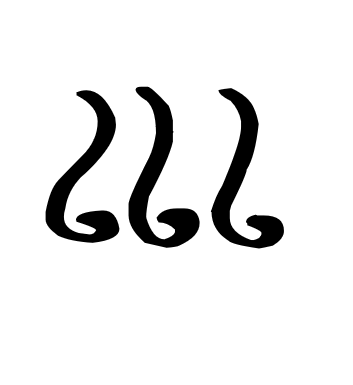

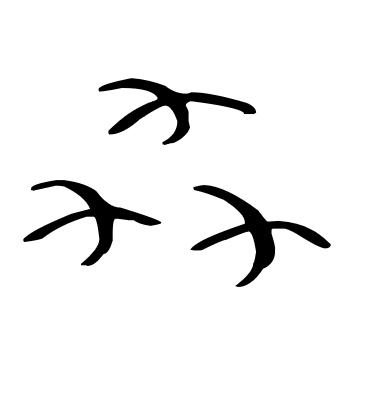

sky - rain - cloud - dew - snow

== Writing media and tools ==
The Naxi name of the script, 'wood and stone records', testifies that Dongba was once carved on stone and wood. Nowadays it is written on handmade paper, typically from the trees Daphne tangutica and D. retusa. The sheets are typically 28 by 14 cm (11 by 5.5 in), and are sewn together at the left edge, forming a book. The pages are ruled into four horizontal lines. Glyphs are written from left to right and top to bottom. Vertical lines are used to section off elements of the text (see image above), equivalent to sentences or paragraphs. Writing utensils include bamboo pens and black ink made from ash.

== See also ==
- Daba
- Youmi Script
