= Choo Waihong =

Singaporean corporate lawyer and travel writer

Choo Waihong (died September 2023) was a Singaporean corporate lawyer, feminist and travel writer, known for her book The Kingdom of Women: Life, Love and Death in China’s Hidden Mountains (2017) about the matriarchal Chinese tribe of Mosuo.

== Biography ==
Choo was from a Chinese community in Singapore. Choo was educated at McGill University in Montreal, Canada. After graduating, Choo worked at law firms in Singapore and California, United States, as a corporate lawyer specialising in fund management law. She took early retirement from her law career in 2006 in order to travel in China and reconnect with her roots.

Choo began writing about her post-retirement travels for the China Daily newspaper. Choo then lived among the matriarchal tribe of Mosuo, who live around Lugu Lake in the Yunnan province, for six months a year over seven years. She built a traditional Mosuo house on the land of a friend and was the first outsider to move into the heart of the tribe. She was taught the Mosuo language by a teenage girl named Ladzu.

Choo wrote the book The Kingdom of Women: Life, Love and Death in China’s Hidden Mountains (2017) about the Mosuo culture. It has been covered by publications including The Guardian, The Diplomat magazine, Physics World, South China Morning Post and Stylist magazine. As of 2017, foreign-language rights had been sold to Finland, Spain, Japan and Korea and a copy of Choo's book is held in the History of Medicine collection of the Wellcome Collection in London, England.

Choo described herself as a feminist and volunteered as vice-president of the AWARE women’s rights group in Singapore, serving for two terms (2007 to 2009).

Choo died in September 2023.
