= Geba syllabary =

Syllabic script for the Naxi language

Geba
- Script type: Syllabary
- Period: Unknown — present
- Direction: Left-to-right

ISO 15924
- ISO 15924: Nkgb (420), Naxi Geba (na²¹ɕi³³ gʌ²¹ba²¹, 'Na-'Khi ²Ggŏ-¹baw, Nakhi Geba)

Geba is a syllabic script for the Naxi language. It is called ¹Ggo¹baw in Naxi, adapted as Geba, 哥巴, in Chinese. Some glyphs resemble the Yi script, and some appear to be adaptations of Chinese characters. Geba is used only to transcribe mantras, and there are few texts, though it is sometimes used to annotate dongba pictographs. Geba's phonetics can vary depending on who is using it. Symbols do not have fixed phonetic values, and they may have the same phonetic values as well.

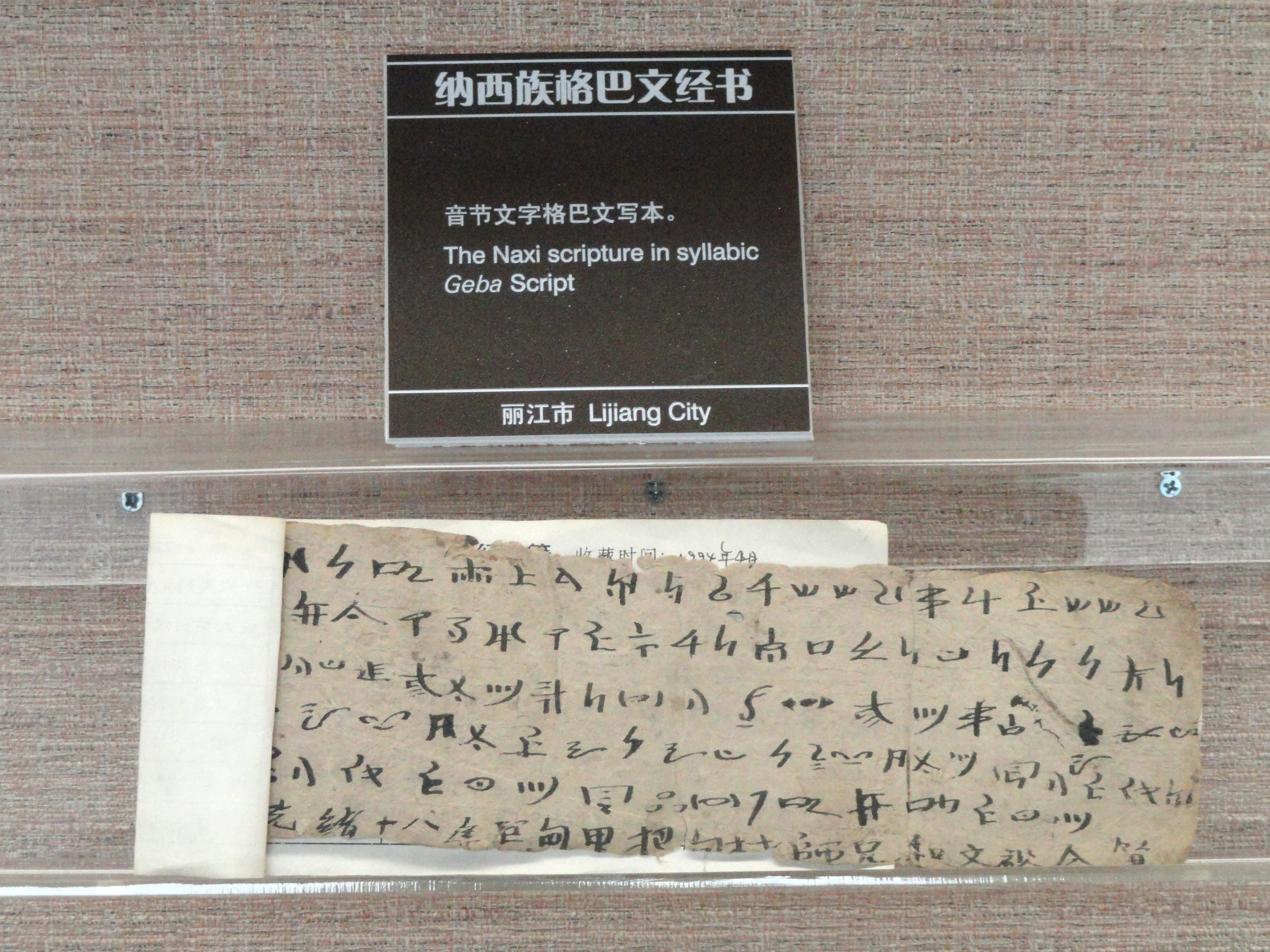
Naxi scripture using the Geba syllabary (Yunnan Nationalities Museum in Kunming, Yunnan, China)

== See also ==
- Youmi script
