= Samnite religion =

Religion of the samnites

The Samnites were an ancient Italic people who lived in modern south-central Italy, placing them between the Latins to the north and the Greek settlements to the south. Consequently, the Samnites had anthropomorphic deities shared with both Rome and Greece, especially after their conquest of Campania at the end of the fourth century BCE. There is additional evidence that suggests the Samnites also believed in spirits called numina. Numina are believed to have been kinless, animistic spirits that could take human form to walk amongst the living. To the Samnites, having good relations with these spirits was of the utmost importance. To honor these deities, the Samnites would sacrifice either living things or make votive offerings.

The Samnites practiced a type of sacrifice called the ver sacrum. In this kind of sacrifice, infants were offered to the god Mamers in hopes of more cattle and offspring. Once they reached adulthood they would be exiled from their community. Superstition was very important in Samnite religion, and they believed that magic and talismans could influence reality. Warriors are said to have been vowed to the gods that they would not retreat in battle under any circumstance, and betraying these vows were forbidden. Sanctuaries were a pillar of Samnite religion and they served many functions, such as marking transhumance routes and establishing borders. From the third century onwards, Samnite sanctuaries slowly became abandoned due to increasing Roman influence in the area that would ultimately result in the extinction of Samnite civilization and language.

== Gods and spirits ==
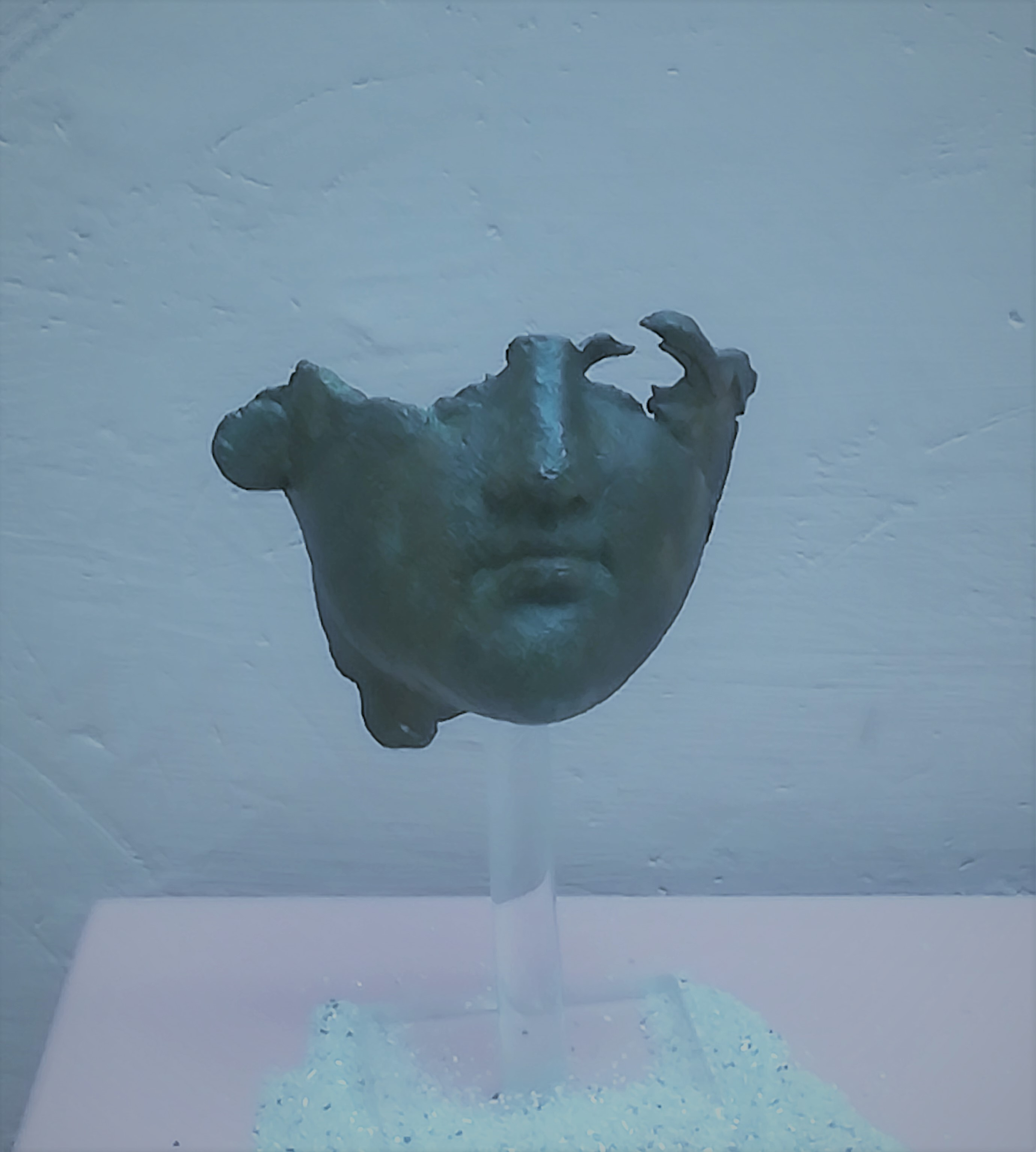
Face of Mefitis

Vaguely defined spirits called Numina were prominent in Samnite mythology. It was essential to establish proper relations with these spirits. They may or may not have had human forms, and could have been genderless, nameless, and kinless. Numina lived in localities such as houses, rivers, mountains, the day, the night. They also excised certain powers, that possibly amounted to nothing more than divine will. Eventually, the Numina evolved into the Samnite gods and goddesses.

Few Samnite gods are known, but some names have survived. Many Samnite gods were also Roman gods. For example, Vulcan, Loesius, Flora, Mefitis, Apollo, Angitia, and Diana were all worshipped. Some gods like Fortuna, Fides, and Spes did not gain importance until after the Roman conquest. There were Samnite gods unique to Samnite or Oscan culture. Such as Herentas, who was the Oscan equivalent of Venus. The most prominent gods in Samnite religion were Mars, and Heracles. Heracles was worshipped by the Samnites as a divine protector of pastoralism, an important aspect of the Samnite economy.

== List of deities ==
Often, the Samnite gods were named with the adjective "Kerríiaí" (singular) or "Kerrìiuìs" (plural) which mean cereal: it worked as a protective adjective and it binded that deity to Ceres's sphere.

=== Listed in the Oscan Tablet ===
- Ammaí Kerríiaí :goddess of spring, equivalent to Maia.
- Anafríss Kerríiuís: nymphs of rain.
- Anter Stataí: midwife goddess, equivalent to Stata Mater
- Deívaí Geneta: equivalent to Mana Geneta.
- Diumpaís Kerríiaís: nymphs of water springs.
- Diúvei :god of the sky, known as Regatureí, bringer of rain, and Verehasiúí, which guards the passing of seasons. Equivalent to Iupiter.
- Evklúí Patereí: equivalent to Mercury.
- Fluusai: goddess of flowers and blossoms, equivalent to Flora.
- Futreí Kerríiaí: daughter of Ceres, equivalent to goddess Libera or Proserpina.
- Hereklúí Kerríiú: patron god, equivalent to Heracle.
- Kerres: goddess of cereals and agriculture, equivalent to Ceres.
- Liganakdíkei Entraí: goddess of plants and fruits.
- Maatúís Kerríiúís: goddesses of birth and dew.
- Patanaí Piístíaí: goddess of wine and grain stalks.
- Pernaí Kerríiaí: goddess of shepherds, equivalent to Pales.
- Vezkeí: unknown god.

=== Other deities ===
- Lúwkeií Kerríiaí: god of sacred groves or luci.
- Mamerte: god of war and agriculture, equivalent to Mars
- Mifineis : goddess of passage, equivalent to Mefitis.

== Practices ==
=== Sacrifices and offerings ===
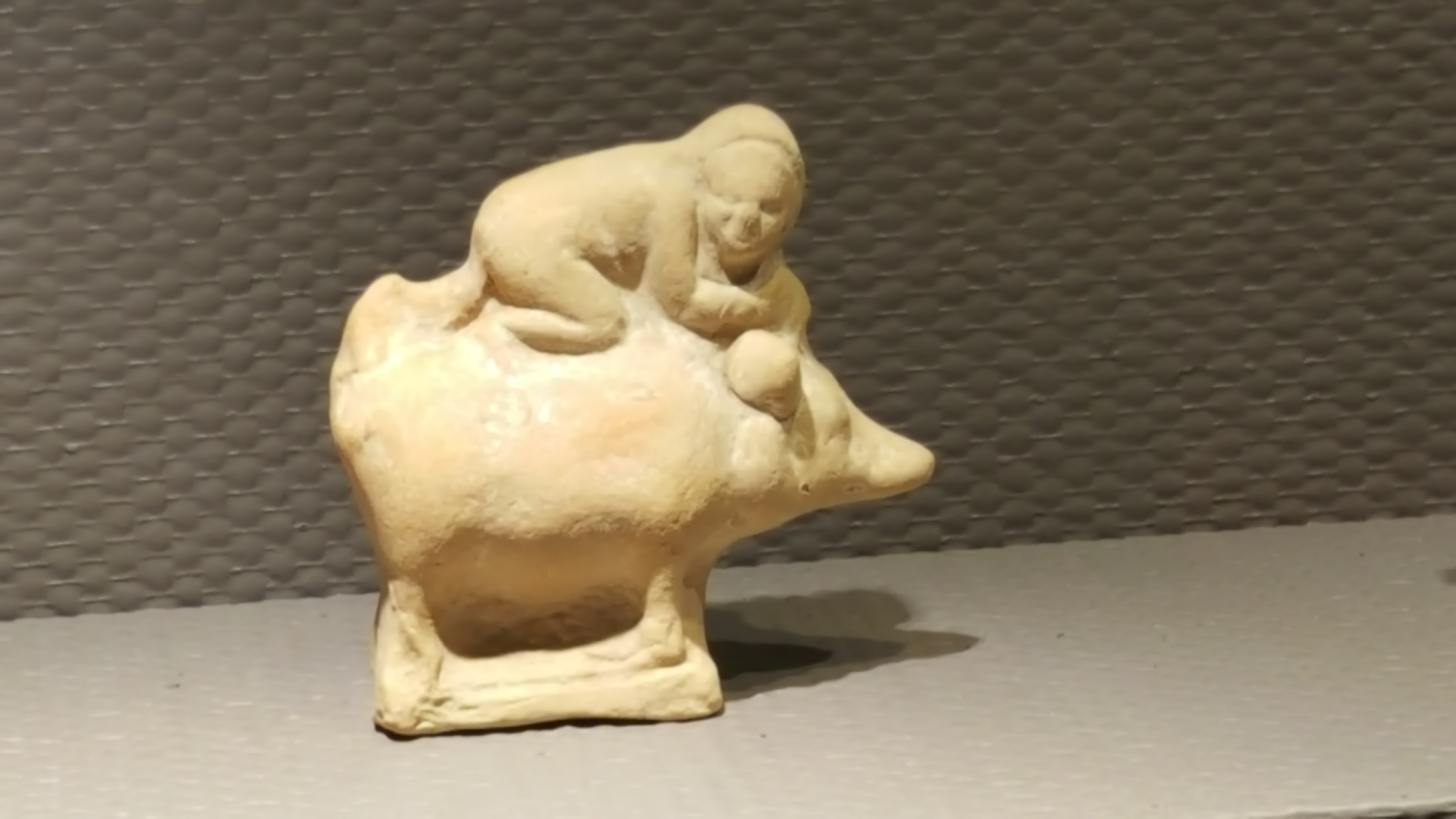
Italian votive offering from the 4th century BCE.

The Samnites would use a fenced off 200 square feet area that was covered in linen cloth to sacrifice animals such as pigs, sheep, goats, birds, cows, fish, roe deer, and oysters. In the beginning of the 5th century BCE, they began to use votive offerings, such as votive bronze figurines, terracotta figurines, pottery, coins, beverages, cakes, animal statuettes, and weapons taken from their defeated enemies. These gifts needed to be important to the populace, and they could entice the gods to aid the offeror.

==== Ver Sacrum ====
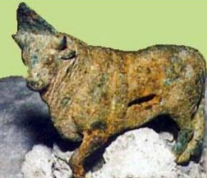
Bronze Bull from the Ver Sacrum

The Ver Sacrum, or Sacred Spring, was a ritual practiced by both ancient Italic civilizations and Romans. In a Ver Sacrum all the offspring of plants and animals were declared property of the gods. Human offspring would be exiled from their homeland once they reached adulthood. It has been suggested that this was done to alleviate overpopulation. However, overpopulation was not a problem for the Samnites, as they had highly developed systems of agriculture.

The Samnites believed that the Ver Sacrum was the origin of their society. The found myth of the Samnites was that bull sent by the war god Mamers, who was the Samnite equivalent of Mars, to lead the Samnites to a new country once they had been exiled Ancient sources claim that all of these sacrifices would be made to Apollo or Mars instead of Mamers. Bulls had symbolic connections to the military in Samnium. The Hirpini believed that they were guided by a wolf to their land. Hence the name Hirpini, from Hirpus, meaning wolf. These myths have often been associated with the founding myth of Rome. Despite how often the ver sacrum appears in ancient literature, very little architectural evidence of this practice exists.

=== Funerary practices ===
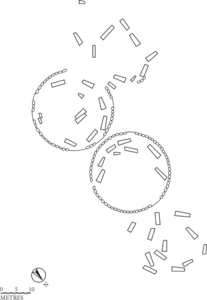
Samnite circular grave sites.

The Samnites believed in an afterlife. To bury a dead Samnite, their corpse needed to be fully dressed, laid out in a supine position, and their head needed to be set upon an object. Goods would be buried with the dead in order to ease their journey into the afterlife. Common goods were food, impasto pottery, purification rites, and bronze and iron ornaments, spindles, loom weights, bowls, weaponry, and armor. It was rare for a Samnite to be buried with gold or silver, on account of how hard they were to import to Samnium. The Samnites may have honored their dead. Burial goods such as weapons, armor, steles, and statues may all have been ways of indicating that the deceased individual was of high status. For a Samnite warrior, the number of burial goods depended on how they died. If they had what they considered to be a "good death," they were buried with much more goods. While soldiers who had a "bad death" were buried with little goods. To put the Manes, or spirits of the dead to rest, games involving combat were played near the tombs.

Dead Samnites were buried in graves consisting of rectangular trenches or limestone cists. These graves were lined with gravel for drainage, and were usually marked with stone. On other occasions, ollae, wooden planks, tiles, or stelae were used. Funerary statues were another way of marking graves. They usually marked the graves of important and powerful Samnites, such as chieftains. One notable example of these statues is the Capestrano Warrior. This statue depicts a figure of local authority, such as a chieftain. In some parts of Samnium, such as Alfedena, graves were organized in circular rows to showcase the relationships between the dead. Elders were buried closer to the center. While those who died younger were buried further. Other parts of Samnium, such as those closer to the Adriatic Coast do not organize graves according to those principles. These graves are organized according to no principles or authority, implying that these areas were more egalitarian.

The number of funerary sites throughout Samnium sharply decline around the fifth to fourth centuries BCE in the Sangro. In Bisaccia, Oliveto Citra, and Cairano funerary sites begin to decline around the sixth century BCE. Alongside this decline, Samnite funerary practices changed. Samnites began to cremate their dead, and either scatter their ashes or place them in a bronze urn called a stamnoi. Burial sites also started to contain fewer goods. Possibly due to the difficulty of acquiring materials necessary for burial, or that high social status was required for burial. Alternatively, the shifting funeral practices could be emblematic of a cultural shift in Samnium. Funerals could have become less prominent in Samnite religion. Alternatively, these changes could be caused due to Samnite culture valuing austerity. However, this theory is contradicted by archaeological evidence. As numerous lavish Samnite graves have been found during this period. Another explanation is that this decline could be the result of sociopolitical changes in Samnium.

=== Superstition and festivals ===
Superstition was essential to the Samnite culture. They practiced augury and believed magic could influence the world. Ceremonies would be performed at weddings to promote fertility and bring good fortune. Priests and important politicians such as the Meddix and Meddix Tuticus were involved in these rituals. Priests also defined the limits to sanctuaries and kept records. The Seviri Augustales were likely based on Samnite priests. Clothing was also an aspect of Samnite religion. They believed that magical amulets could protect their owners from harm. These amulets were usually made from expensive materials that showcased wealth. Like beads or pendants. They were also usually given to young women that were old enough to bear children. Depictions of people worshipping at the Samnite sanctuary of Pietrabbondante showcase them wearing veils, capes, and a head ornament resembling a polos. It is common for these worshippers to also hold objects. Such as focaccia or bronze goblets. Red paint was also used to decorate the faces of people whilst they chanted. These chants were common at harvests, festivals, and marriages.

==== Oath ====
The Samnite oath was a practice described by the historian Livy. This practice, which was unique to the Samnite civilization, was used to bind soldiers to their army, and their war. It would transform civilians into soldiers, and prepare them for rigorous training. Livy describes Samnite priests binding soldiers to this oath using linen books. Such a practice may have formed the basis of a Roman practice called the sacramentum militare, or "soldier's oath." It is unclear if the Samnites really took these kinds of oaths. Livy may have made it up. Another possibility is that Livy embellished parts of this practice, but it was still an aspect of Samnite religion.

== Sanctuaries ==
=== Architecture ===
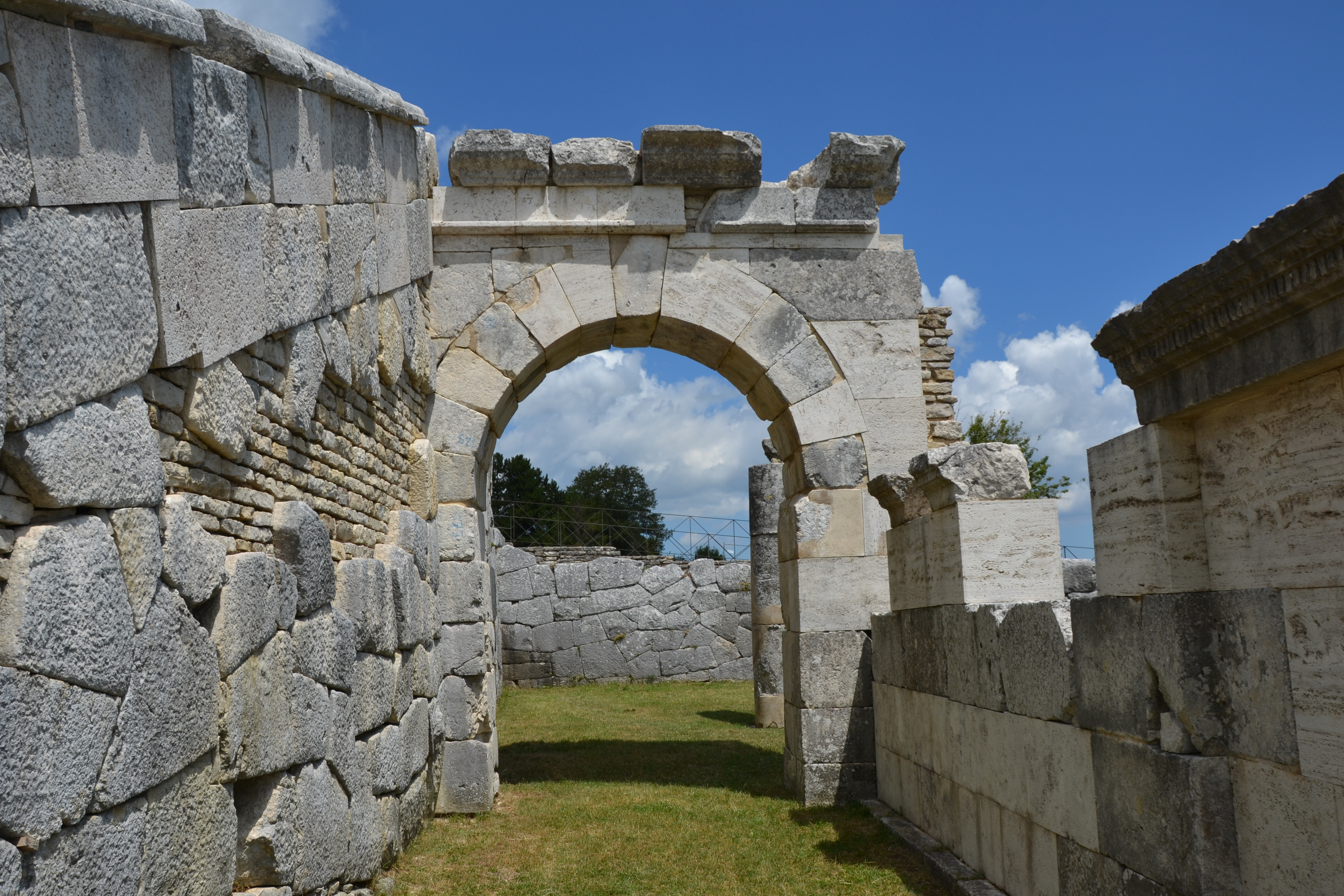
Samnite sanctuary complex at Pietrabbondante. The sanctuary at Pietrabbondante was likely at the top of Samnite social hierarchy.

Samnite sanctuaries used Ionic architecture. They consisted of temples surrounded by several other buildings. Inside these temples, altars were placed in front of podiums. The podium were aligned with cellarettes. Which were flanked by porticoes. Alongside the temple, sanctuaries could also have theaters. One temple has a theater with walls decorated with telamones. Pentrian sanctuaries were usually open-air and were usually made of perishable material. Tiles dating back to the 2nd century BCE usually contain inscriptions naming the Meddix Tuticus. All of these tiles bear the same stamp detailing the workshop where it was made. Indicating that a single workshop produced all of the tiles for the sanctuaries. Rural sanctuaries began to be constructed in the 4th century BCE, and stone temples began to be built in the late 3rd century BCE. There are a variety of explanations for this design shift. It could have been a prerequisite to even further change. Powerful families could have pushed for the architectural change. Alternatively, this design change could be explained by a desire to display wealth, or a shift in sociopolitical organization.

=== Functions ===
Sanctuaries were built for a variety of reasons. Possibly to profit off of Mediterranean trade network. Although, it is unclear how they would make or spend profit. Another theory is that they were built where government business was conducted. Sanctuaries may also have been connected to pastoralism. Connections between agriculture and sanctuaries are evidenced by the gods worshipped in these places. Many of them, such as Hercules, were connected to transhumance in Samnite culture. Indicating that the sanctuaries could have profited off of transhumance, or housed herdsmen. It is possible that this function was only developed after the Roman conquest of Samnium. Hercules was worshipped in Samnite culture long before the Roman conquest. However, he may only have developed his connections to pastoralism after the Roman conquest. Implying that connections between sanctuaries and pastoralism only developed after the Romans conquered the Samnites.

Sanctuaries may also have marked the borders between rural and urban areas, or marked the lack of borders between communities. They could also have served as meeting places between bordering communities, meeting places between officials, and as a representation of the city's autonomy. The level of government each sanctuary served depended on its location. Urban sanctuaries were relevant to either the Pagi, or the Vicus. Rural sanctuaries were relevant to the touto, or the pagi. One law called the Lex Aedis Furfensis possibly implies a connection between the Samnite government and the Samnite sanctuaries. However, other epigraphic evidence for this is limited, or even nonexistent. After the Roman conquest sanctuaries located near urban centers possibly became relevant to the Municipium. However, epigraphic evidence for this is unclear. Xenophobia may have played a part in sanctuaries. It is possible that sanctuaries were designed to reinforce group identities.

=== Decline ===
As Roman influence in Samnium grew, the number of sanctuaries declined. Possibly because sanctuaries began to be replaced by municipal centers. Alternatively, it could have been a part of an effort to become Romanized. Rome took an active role in Romanizing the Samnites. They spread Roman religious items, forced temples to adopt Roman culture, and destroyed sanctuaries. Urbanization also played a role in the decline of sanctuaries. As Samnium become more urbanized, rural sanctuaries were abandoned. Alongside the decline in the number of sanctuaries, their power also declined. Sanctuaries were no longer were relevant to the entirety of a vicus or pagus. Roman styles of architecture also became prominent in the sanctuaries built after the Roman conquest.
