= Dongba =

Religion and the priests of the Nakhi people of Southwest China

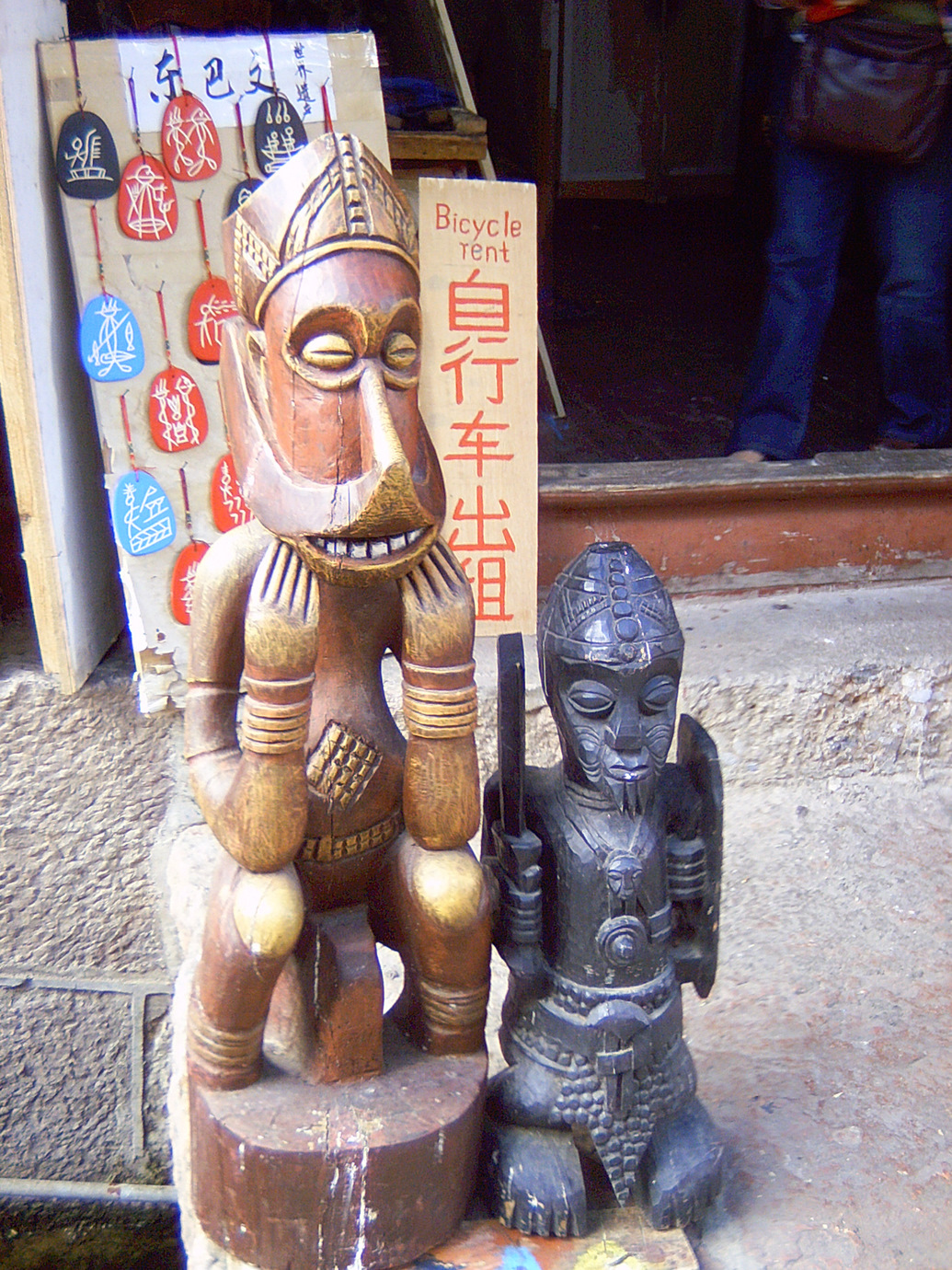
Dongba wood carving in the ancient town of Shuhe, Yunnan

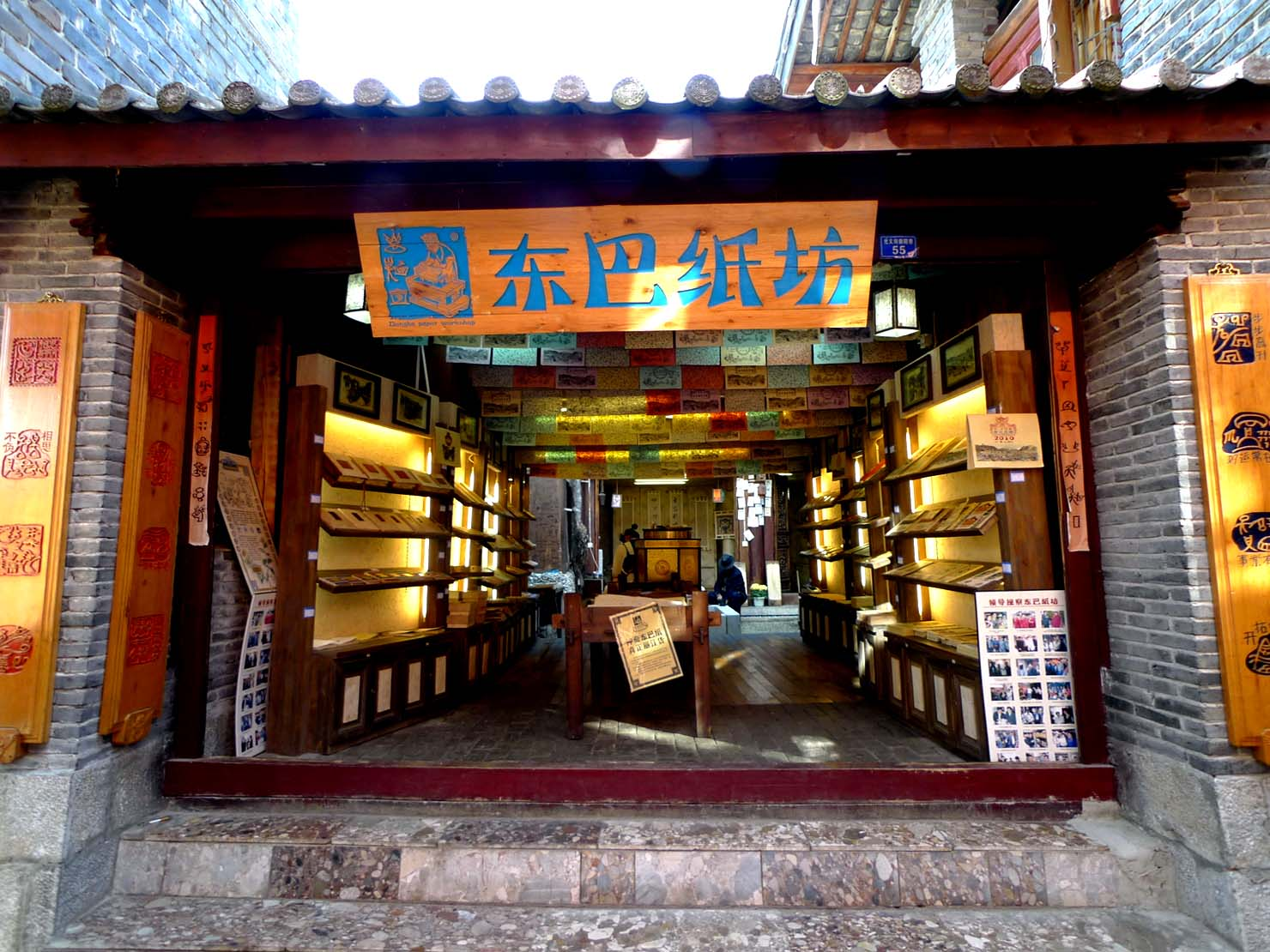
Dongba paper shop in the old town Lijiang

Dongba (Nakhi: ²dto¹mba, Chinese: 东巴; pinyin: dōngbā; lit. 'Ba of the East') refers to both the religion and the priests of the Nakhi people of southwest China.

== Role in society ==
Dongba is believed to have originated from the indigenous Tibetan Bon religion. According to Nakhi legend, these teachings first came to Yunnan from a Bon shaman from eastern Tibet named Dongba Shilo (丁巴什罗). The strong Tibetan influence can be seen today in the rituals and costumes of the Dongba priests, who invoke Bon spirits and are often adorned with pictures of Bon gods on their headgear.

Currently, the religion is deeply ingrained in Nakhi culture, with Dongba priests serving as the primary transmitters of traditional Nakhi culture, literature and the pictographic Dongba symbols. The priests also conduct a variety of rituals to propitiate the many gods and spirits which are believed to play an active part in the natural world. The core of the Dongba religion is based on the belief that both man and nature are two half-brothers born of two mothers and the same father.

Prior to Tibetan influence, it is suggested that the original Nakhi priests were female llü-bu. At that time, statues or religious images could be widely seen everywhere.

A complete annotated translation of ancient Nakhi Dongba books (simplified Chinese: 纳西东巴古籍译注全集), in 100 volumes, has been published.

== Bibliography ==
Xu Duoduo. (2015). A Comparison of the Twenty-Eight Lunar Mansions Between Dabaism and Dongbaism. Archaeoastronomy and Ancient Technologies, 3 (2015) 2: 61-81 (links: 1. academia.edu; 2. Archaeoastronomy and Ancient Technologies).

== See also ==
- Daba (Mosuo religion)
- Dongba symbols
