= Mosuo =

Chinese minority people

Mosuo (also Moso, Musuo, Mosso and Naxi )
Total population
- 50,000

Regions with significant populations
- China (Sichuan · Yunnan)

Languages
- Na

Religion
- Daba, and Tibetan Buddhism (Gelug)

Related ethnic groups
- Nakhi

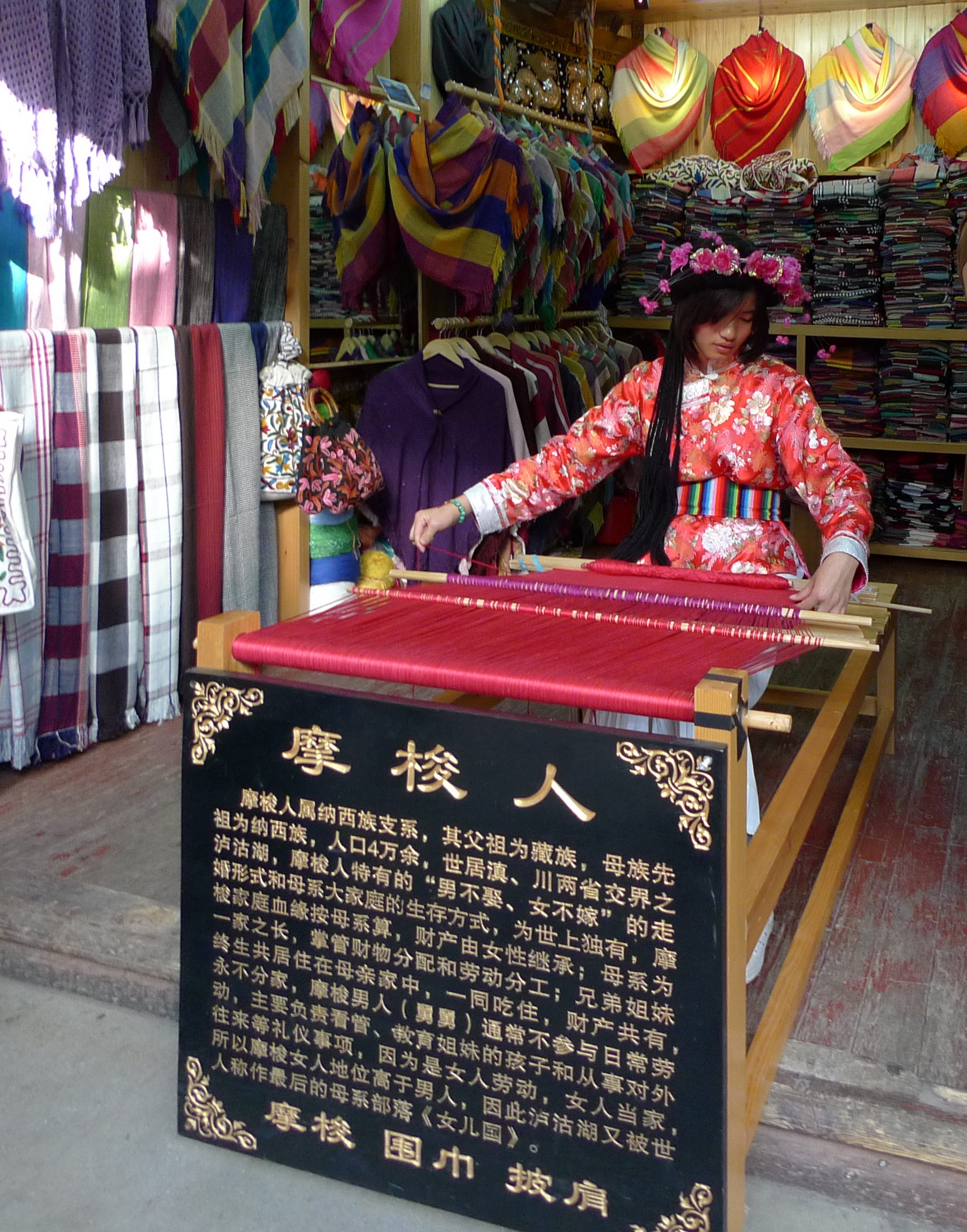
Mosuo girl weaver in Old town Lijiang

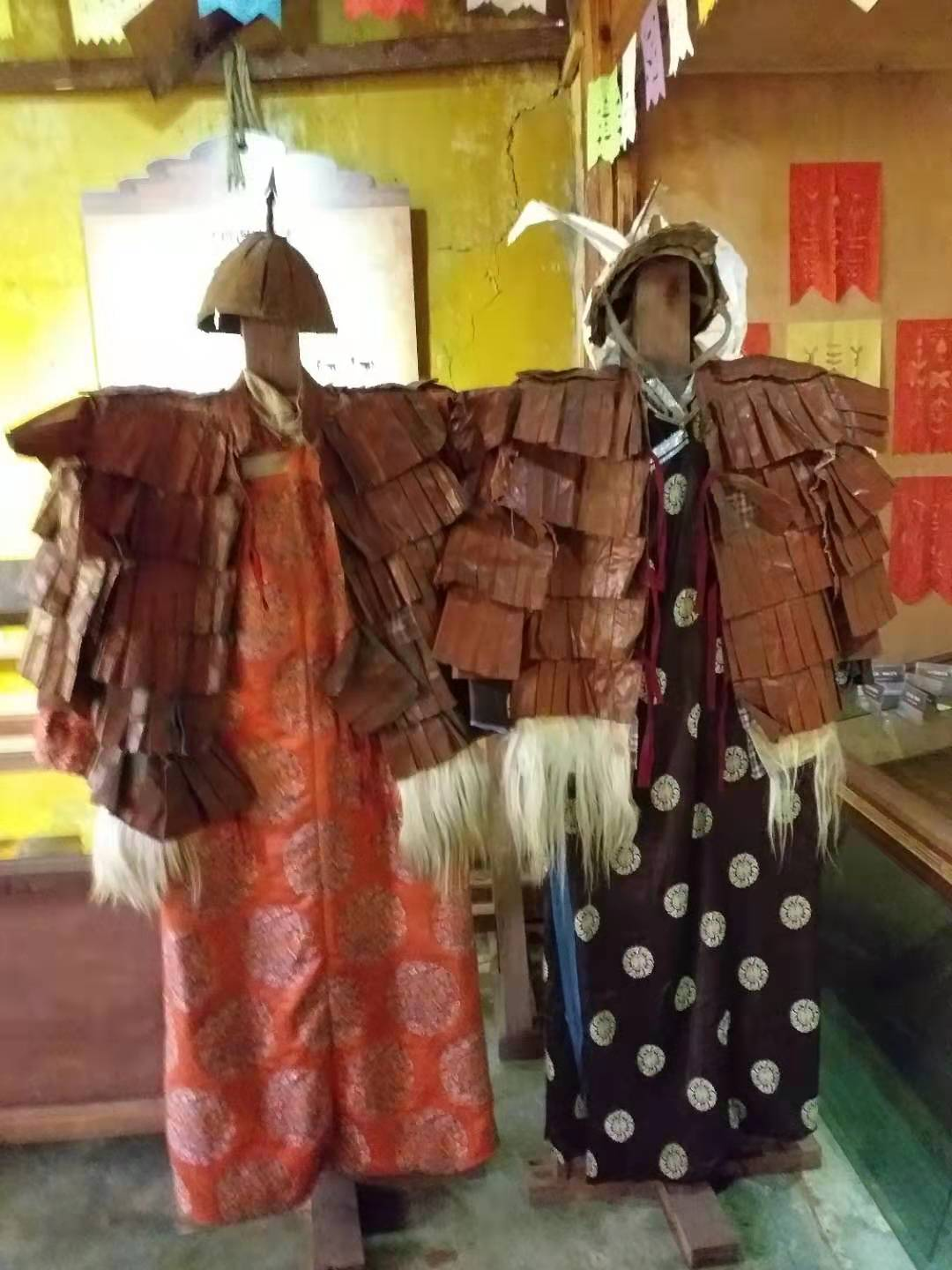
Clothes of religious ceremonies of Moso, photo taken at Moso's Folk museum.

The Mosuo (Chinese: 摩梭; pinyin: Mósuō; also spelled Moso, Mosso or Musuo) or Na, often incorrectly referred to as the Naxi, are an ethnic group living in the Hengduan mountains of China's Yunnan and Sichuan provinces. They currently have a population of approximately 40,000, many of them living in the Yongning region, around Lugu Lake, in Labai, in Muli, and in Yanyuan.

Although the Mosuo are culturally distinct from the Nashi, the Chinese government claims they are the same as the Nashi people. The Nashi vastly outnumber the Mosuo at around 320,000 people spread throughout different provinces in China. Their culture has been documented by indigenous scholars Lamu Gatusa, Latami Dashi, Yang Lifen, and He Mei.

== Introduction ==
The Mosuo are often referred to as China's "last matrilineal society". The Mosuo themselves may also often use the description matriarchal, which they believe increases interest in their culture and thus attracts tourism. However, the terms matrilineal and matriarchal do not reflect the full complexity of their social organization. In fact, it is not easy to categorize Mosuo culture within traditional anthropological categories. They have aspects of a matriarchal culture: women are often the head of the house, inheritance is through the female line, and women make business decisions. However, unlike a matriarchy, the political power tends to be in the hands of men. For instance, a man named Ge Ze A Che is the political leader of Luoshui village. However, according to an article by NPR, there was once a time when the political leaders of Mosuo villages were in fact often women. The anthropologist Peggy Reeves Sanday has argued that the Mosuo should be considered a matriarchy. Further, scholars have argued that while matrilineal arrangements are the normative pattern, domestic arrangements still vary geographically and by family circumstance. Pascale-Marie Milan dislikes the term matriarchal instead using matrifocal.

== Lifestyle ==
=== Society ===
The core structure of Mosuo society is a corporate house group of about twenty people called the Awo, as the Mosuo are a matrilineal house society. Buildings, lands and livestock are owned collectively by the house and Musuo customs are largely made in order to maintain it, not for individual initiative. When an Awo grows too large, it is split into multiple awo, which stay a part of the larger matriline or Sissi. It is rare, but Awo sometimes adopt new members from other houses, often due to outside pressure or a house group being at risk.

Awo use their kin connections with other Awo in order to preserve their own Awo and accomplish projects that one Awo can't do on its own. Individuals will often be sent out to help neighboring houses with the expectation that it will be reciprocated down the line. Usually, Awo will call on their Sissi, the Awo of the partners of the women or simply the other households in the village for assistance.

The leader of the Awo is called the Ddabbu. This role goes from sister to sister and then to a daughter. It is typically given to a woman unless a man is particularly suited for the job. Although the Ddabbu is the leader of the Awo, nonroutine decisions are always made by adult members of the household, especially the Ddabbu's sisters and brothers, often during meals. Roles in the house are given based on each person's skillset.

=== Daily life ===
Mosuo culture is primarily agrarian, with work based on farming tasks such as raising livestock (yak, water buffalo, sheep, goats, poultry) and growing crops, including grains and potatoes. The people are largely self-sufficient in diet, raising enough for their daily needs. Meat is an important part of their diet and, since they lack refrigeration, is preserved through salting or smoking. The Mosuo are renowned for their preserved pork, which may be kept for 10 years or more. They produce a local alcoholic beverage made from grain, called sulima, which is similar to strong wine. Sulima is drunk regularly and usually offered to guests and at ceremonies and festivals.

Local economies tend to be gift or barter-based. However, more interaction with the outside world has led people to use cash more often. Average incomes are low (US$150–200 per year), causing financial issues when cash is needed for activities such as education or travel. Electricity has been introduced in most Mosuo communities, but some villages still lack electric power.

Mosuo homes consist of four rectangular structures arranged in a square, around a central courtyard. The first floor houses livestock, including water buffalo, horses, geese, and poultry. The main cooking, eating and visiting areas are also on the first floor. The second floor is commonly used for storage and for the bedrooms.

Tasks are largely distributed based on gender and age (grouped into elders, adults (put into a sisters-brothers dyad) and children), although this is highly flexible and often not followed as the wellbeing of the Awo is centered first and foremost. The sisters-brothers dyad takes care of the Awo while the children do simple routine tasks and the elders do weaving or help the children with herding.

=== Role of women ===
As soon as a Mosuo girl becomes old enough, she learns the tasks that she will perform for the rest of her life. Mosuo women do all the housework, including cleaning, tending the fire, cooking, gathering firewood, feeding the livestock, and spinning and weaving. In the past, due to isolation, Mosuo women produced much of their own household goods. Today, due to increased trade with surrounding villages and cities, it is easier to obtain goods. Nevertheless, some Mosuo women, especially those of older generations, know how to use looms to produce cloth goods.

=== Role of men ===
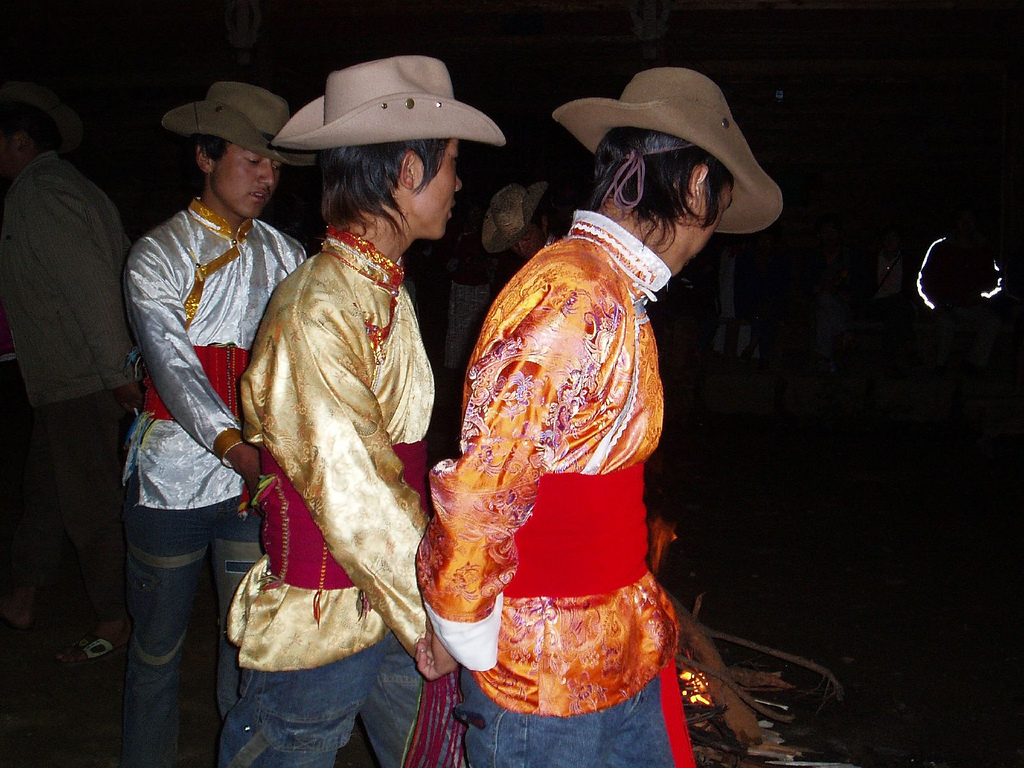
Mosuo men

Mosuo men help to bring up the children of their sisters and female cousins, build houses, and are in charge of livestock and fishing, which they learn from their uncles and older male family members as soon as they are old enough. Some misleading authors claim men have no responsibility in Mosuo society — they have no jobs, rest all day, and conserve their strength for nighttime visits.

Men deal with the slaughter of livestock, in which women never participate. Slaughtered pigs, in particular, are kept whole and stored in a dry, airy place that keeps them edible for up to ten years. This is especially helpful when harsh winters make food scarce.

== Matrilineality ==
Except for the women and men who leave Mosuo society, Mosuo people usually learn who their father is through casual conversation and hints from family and neighbors. When a baby turns one year old, the mother and sister of the father will visit, bringing gifts. On major festivals, children visit their father's Awo. Fathers are not responsible for disciplining nor for providing for their children. Instead, they are expected to discipline and provide for their sisters' children and to be close to their nephews' biological children. Therefore, the Mosuo people "know their father but are not close to their father". If the wife moves into their husband's Awo her children inherit her husband's identity not their mothers.

=== Matriarch ===
The matriarch (Ah mi, or elder female, in Chinese) is the head of the Awo. The Ah mi has significant power over her household. She's responsible for all those living under her roof. In walking marriages, Mosuo women are responsible for much of the work done around the house and financial decisions. The matriarch also manages the money and jobs of each family member. When the Ah mi wishes to pass her duties on to the next generation, she will give this female successor the keys to the household storage, signifying the passing on of property rights and responsibility.

=== History ===
An important historical fact often missed in studies of the Mosuo was that their social organization has traditionally been feudal, with a small nobility controlling a larger peasant population. The Mosuo nobility practiced a "parallel line of descent" that encouraged cohabitation, usually within the nobility, in which the father passed his social status to his sons, while the women passed their status to their daughters. Thus, if a Mosuo commoner female married a male serf, her daughter would be another commoner, while her son would have serf status.

Chuan-Kang Shih argued that matrilineality and "walking marriage" (tisese) is a primary institution of family, sex and reproduction, and marriage is secondary. As Shih argues, marriage, as different from tisese, was introduced into Mosuo society through contact with other ethnic groups during the Yuan and Qing empire-building process.

=== Adoption ===
If there are no offspring of one sex, it is common for a child from another family to join an adoptive Awo. Such a child might come from a large family, or one too small to continue. Children raised in this sense are full members of their adoptive household. They are treated as equal family members; in some instances, adopted females become the matriarchs of their adoptive families.

== Walking marriages ==
One of the best known aspects of Mosuo culture is its practice of "walking marriage" (Chinese: 走婚; pinyin: zǒu hūn), although this practice remains poorly understood. Walking marriages are the most prominent form of marriage in Mosuo culture; however, it is not unheard of for women in Mosuo culture to cohabit with their husbands, whether it is marriages with foreigners or other Mosuo people. In a walking marriage, both partners live under the roof of their respective extended families during the day; however, at night it is common for the man to visit and stay at the woman's house (if given permission) until sunrise. Therefore, they do not technically live in the same household, but they are free to visit when granted permission. Children of parents in a walking marriage are raised by the brothers of the mother (maternal uncles), who take on the responsibilities of the father since he is not typically around during the daytime. In long term marriages the wife and husband refer to each other as Chumi and Haechube.

Shih (2010) offers the most sophisticated anthropological account of Mosuo practices of sexual union. "All on-going sexual relationships in Mosuo culture are called "walking marriages." These bonds are "based on mutual affection." "When a Mosuo woman or man expresses interest in a potential partner, it is the woman who may give the man permission to visit her. These visits are usually kept secret, with the man visiting the woman's house after dark, spending the night, and returning to his own home in the morning." After the birth of the child, the man has no moral, cultural, or legal obligation to take care of the child. However, the child will be raised with adequate care and attention. The overwhelming support from the woman's extended family allows both the man and woman to engage in sexual relations with whomever they please.

=== General practice ===
"The Mosuo have large extended families, and several generations (great-grandparents, grandparents, parents, children, grandchildren, aunts, uncles, nieces, nephews, etc.) live together in the same house. Everyone lives in communal quarters, and there are no private bedrooms or living areas, except for women between certain ages (see the section on "coming of age", below) who may have their own private rooms."

"While a pairing may be long-term, the man never lives with the woman's family, or vice versa. Mosuo men and women continue to live with and be responsible to their respective families. The couple do not share property. The father usually has little responsibility for his offspring." However, this does not mean that men can wipe their hands free of responsibilities and spend every night participating in shenanigans. After work, they are obligated to go home and help raise their nieces and nephews. The children rely on the collective effort of the extended family rather than that of the biological father.

"A father may indicate an interest in the upbringing of his children by bringing gifts to the mother's family. This gives him status within the mother's family, while not actually making him part of the family."

=== Matrilineal society ===
Unlike other cultures, women in the Mosuo society are central to the Awo and its family. They are responsible for housework, agricultural duties, and taking care of children. In a walking marriage, the ancestral line is most important on the wife's side of the family and the children of the couple reside and belong to the wife's family household. Considering women are responsible for most domestic jobs, they have a larger role in the walking marriage and are viewed with more respect and importance in this society.

Husbands in walking marriages have a much less involved role than wives. The husbands in these relationships are generally the figures who are in charge of all religious and political decisions for the family. Regarding the family responsibilities, the father or husband in the family does not have nearly as many responsibilities regarding the family as the wife does. In fact, the male relatives of the mother's side of the family, such as uncles and cousins, are generally the "father figure" to the husband's children. The mother's brothers occupy a central role in the Awo. Their roles include disciplining children, caring for them, and supporting the children financially. Since the husband and wife live with their separate immediate families, they help take care of the families' children and issues regarding their household. Even though fathers are involved in their sister's children's lives, they are not necessarily involved in their biological children's life. In walking marriages, the involvement of a father in his child's life is optional. If a father decides to be involved in the upbringing of his own biological child, he can bring gifts and work for his wife's Awo. This relationship can be performed regardless if the woman and man are still in the walking marriage and it gives the man a type of "official status" among the family without being fully involved.

=== Advantages to a walking marriage ===
Other than the child receiving exceptional care and attention from the extended family, there are many inconspicuous advantages for participating in a walking marriage. For example: divorce is never an issue because the man and woman are not legally bound together, thus sharing very few of the same responsibilities. There are also never any disputes over who owns custody of the child since the child belongs to the mother's extended family and takes the mother's last name. In the case of a parent's death, the child still has a prodigious amount of care and affection from the extended family.

=== Myths and controversies ===
Outsiders often believe the following myths:

==== Mosuo women have many partners ====
"While it is possible for a Mosuo woman to change partners as often as she likes [...] the majority of such couplings will actually be more long term. And few Mosuo women have more than one partner at a time. Anthropologists have described this system as 'serial monogamy'; and, in fact, many such pairings may last for a lifetime."

But, in other anthropologists' views, it is a more recent change, "in the face of political campaigns and cultural integration with the Han Chinese", and "previous generations often continued with multiple partners even after a child was born. Some older Na report having upwards of 30, 40, even 50 partners throughout their lifetime" and despite these changes, "notions of exclusivity are not entrenched, and the Na language has no word for 'jealousy'."

==== Fathers of children are not known and unimportant ====
The large majority of women know their children's fathers; it is actually a source of embarrassment if a mother cannot identify a child's father. But, "unlike many cultures which castigate mothers and children without clear paternity, Na children induce no such censure". The father of a child born from a walking marriage will not see his child during the day, but rather at night time. The father doesn't play as large a role in the development of the child. "At a child's birth, the father, his mother and sisters come to celebrate, and bring gifts. On New Year's Day, a child visits the father to pay respect to him and his Awo. A father also participates in the coming-of-age ceremony. Though he does not have an everyday role, the father is nevertheless an important partner." Mosuo refer to their fathers as ave, ada and abo which is the same term used for uncles. Fathers visit their children regularly, assist them and hold feasts for them at their Awo. Especially when the brothers are absent from the household are the fathers called in for assistance.

== Customs ==
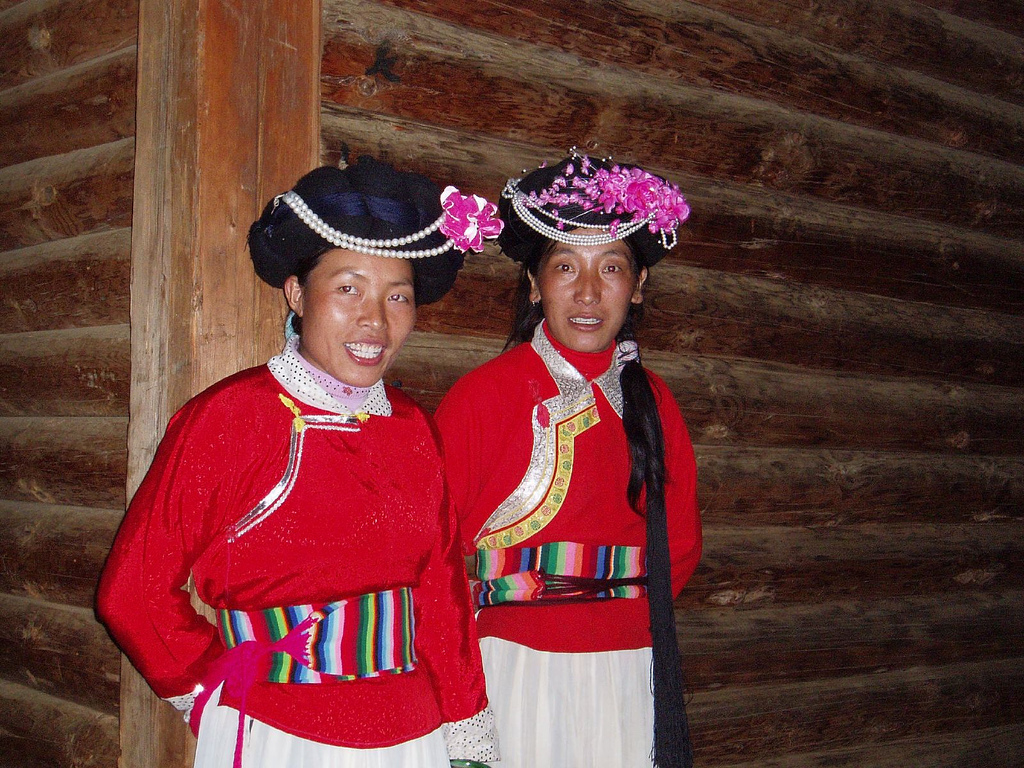
Mosuo women

=== Coming of age ===
The coming-of-age ceremony, which occurs at the age of thirteen, is one of the most important events in a Mosuo child's life. Before this ceremony, Mosuo children all dress the same and are restricted from certain aspects of Mosuo life, particularly those that involve religious rites. Also, a child who dies before this ceremony does not receive the traditional funeral. Once they come of age, girls are given their skirts, and boys are given their trousers (thus, it is called the "skirt ceremony" for girls, and the "trouser ceremony" for boys).

After coming of age, Mosuo women can get their own private bedroom, called a "flowering room"; and, once past puberty, can begin to invite partners for "walking marriages".

=== Hearth ===
The Mosuo describe the hearth as the heart of the Awo. It combines the worship of nature, ancestors, and spirits. Behind the hearth is a slab of stone (called guo zhuang in Chinese) and an ancestral altar where Mosuo household members leave a food offering. They do this before each meal, even when having tea.

=== Funeral ===
Death is the domain of men, who make all funeral arrangements. It is the only time men prepare food for family and guests. Usually, every family in the village will send at least one man to help with the preparations. Dabas and Lamas are invited to recite prayers for the deceased. Mosuo believe that if a spirit does not have the assistance of a daba, it will be lost. Without Lamas, a spirit will not be able to attain reincarnation. Caskets are small and square, with the deceased's body placed in the fetal position so that it can be reborn in the next life. During cremation, a decorated horse is led around the fire, which Mosuo believe will help carry the deceased's spirit away. Afterwards, friends and family gather to pay their last respects and wish the deceased an easy journey to their ancestral land.

=== Dogs ===
While some Asian cultures practice the custom of eating dogs, this is strictly forbidden to the Mosuo. In Mosuo culture, a myth describes that long ago, dogs had life spans of 60 years while humans had life spans of thirteen years. Humans felt their life span was too short, so they traded it with the dogs in exchange for paying homage to them. Therefore, dogs are valued members of the family. They are never killed, and they most certainly are never eaten. During the initiation rites into adulthood, Mosuo adolescents pray before the family dogs.

== Religion ==
Religion is a major part of Mosuo life. It is made up of two coexisting religions: their own ethnoreligion called Daba and various syncretic adoptions from Tibetan Buddhism, especially the Gelug school.

=== Daba ===
Daba is the religion of Na people It holds most of the Na's culture and history. They worship a variety of animistic spirits including various persons of the natural world, their ancestors and the worship of a mother goddess. Daba also refers to the religious leaders of the Na. Their primary tasks are to be literate priests and shamans for the Na people. They perform exorcisms, bless families and assist deceased spirits. Priests go into a trance and can converse with these spirits. A cultural crisis is emerging. Due to past Chinese government policies, which made being a daba illegal (this policy has now stopped), there are very few remaining dabas. This leads some Na to worry that their history and heritage may be lost. Recently, Tibetan Buddhism has also gotten a more prominent role in Mosuo society.

== Economy ==
The Mosuo are primarily farmers. Subsistence is mostly based on agriculture. Farmers work "seven hours a day and seven months a year". In the past, they cultivated oats, buckwheat, and flax exclusively. This changed under Han influence at the end of the nineteenth century. Since then, these farmers have also cultivated, among other things, corn, sunflowers, soybeans, potatoes and other vegetables such as pumpkins and beans. Potatoes were their main staple for a while until the mid-twentieth century when they began growing rice, which today makes up more than half of annual production. In recent years, subsistence for some Mosuo has shifted dramatically from agriculture due to a thriving tourist industry

Mosuo also keep a variety of livestock. Since the early twentieth century they have raised buffalo, cows, horses, and goats which originated from Han and Tibetan regions. However, their preferred stock is pigs. Pork plays several important roles in Mosuo society. It is fed to guests, is the obligatory offering at funerals, and used as payment or reimbursement. Hua (2001) insists that it is "a kind of currency and... a symbol of wealth".

Once a year, regions of Mosuo males gather for a livestock fair. They travel for miles on buses, horses, or foot to attend. Here men sell and trade livestock to supplement their Awo's income.

The Mosuo fish on Lake Lugu and also set land-based fish traps; however, they do not use motorboats, and catching fish in open water using their very primitive gear is not easy.'

In recent times some Musuo go to nearby towns to earn extra income to buy some Chinese products however most Musuo are still subsistance farmers.

== Language ==
The Mosuo speak Na (a.k.a. Narua), a Naish language (closely related to Naxi), a member of the Sino-Tibetan language family. Although there is no question that the language of the Mosuo and that of the Naxi are closely related, some Mosuo speakers resent the use of the language name Naxi, which is commonly used to refer to the dialect of the town of Lijiang and the surrounding villages. A more adequate name is Na, used in several linguistic publications. The name "Narua" is used in the Summer Institute of Linguistics' inventory of languages, Ethnologue. Narua A collection of audio recordings is available online for the dialects of Yongning, Lataddi, Qiansuo, and Lijiazui, and a trilingual dictionary has also been posted online. Two book-length descriptions of the language are available, as well as several research articles.

Yongning Na, which is spoken in Yongning township, Lijiang municipality, Yunnan, China, has been documented by Jacques and Michaud (2011).

== Youmi Script ==
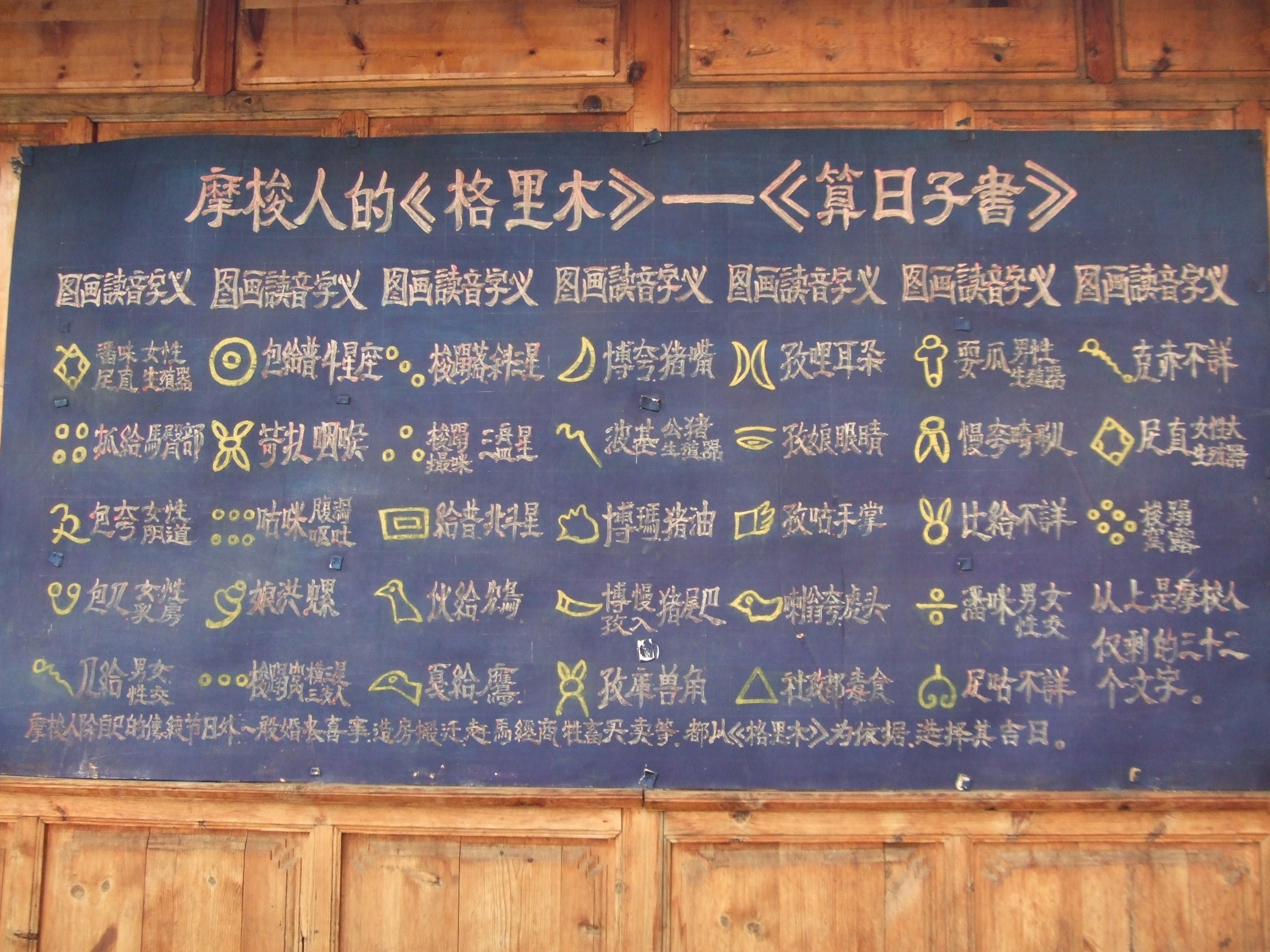
A chart of ancient Mosuo symbols (and meanings written in Chinese) found at the Mosuo Cultural Museum, Lugu Lake

Despite claims to the Mosuo being a solely oral society the Mosuo used to have a hieroglyphic script that was written on animal hides although now only 32 characters and an oral memory remain. Their script is understudied compared to the related Dongba script of their neighbors. However the Mosuo community of Youmi, a village of both Nashi and Mosuo, has led to the discovery of over 400 new characters and over 300 sacred texts belonging to the Mosuo people.

Like other Chinese, the Mosuo today use Han script for daily communication. The Tibetan script may sometimes be used for religious purposes. However, there are currently efforts underway to develop a full written form of the Mosuo language.

== Intercultural exchanges ==
The Han are the ethnic majority of China, one of the 56 ethnic groups of China. In the Yongning region during the Ming Dynasty, the Mosuo integrated many Han ideals. The Mosuo also accepted Buddhism and adapted it to fit their values. Neither the Cultural Revolution nor trade between different cultures fundamentally changed Mosuo beliefs. But recently, Mosuo society has been rapidly changing.

=== Modernity ===
With improved technology, there are better roads and transportation. Young Mosuo men and women use these modes to leave their villages and find employment in neighboring cities. Television has brought the ideas of the modern world and an image of a more affluent lifestyle. Also, men have begun to take jobs independent of their Awo and earn their own income. Older Mosuo fear emerging property conflicts as a consequence. Care for the family, with younger generations leaving the villages, is also a concern.

=== Tourism ===
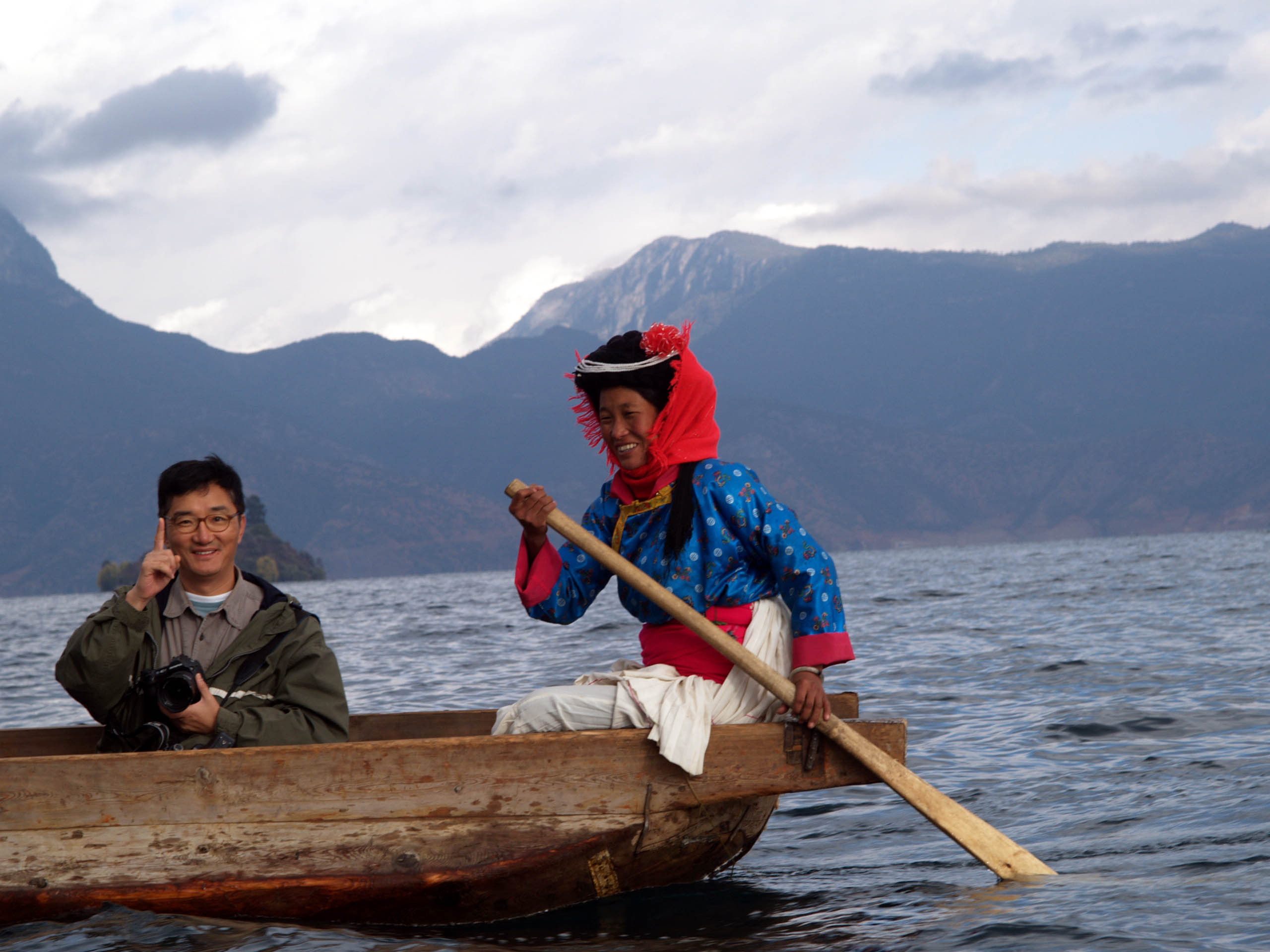
On Lake Lugu

Mosuo living near Lugu Lake inhabit an scenic region that bring photographers, television crews, writers, and artists. This increased attention has also brought tourists. Tourists are usually Han Chinese and they typically come as a part of organized tour groups who fetishize Mosuo culture as "exotic." Many Han tourists also visit in hopes of fulfilling erotic fantasies wrongly associated with Mosuo social norms. Tourism has influenced kinship and parenting practices, with Mosuo residing in areas where tourism is prevalent being less likely to adhere to strict matrilineal norms.

== Films ==
There are many documentaries made about the Mosuo, in English and Mandarin, and there has even been a film festival dedicated to some of them. Most films perpetuate the myth that men have no say in Awo matters and do not work.

- "Without Fathers or Husbands" (1995, 26 min., Royal Anthropological Institute). Made by Chinese born, French educated anthropologist Cai Hua. It does not make claims about matriarchy.
- "A World without Fathers and Husbands" Eric Blavier (2000, 52 min.)
- "The Ladies of the Lake: A Matriarchal Society" (20 min.)
- Elsewhere (2001)
- "Frontline World: The Women's Kingdom" (July 19, 2005, 9 min.)
- Mosso, the Land of Free Love: The Last Matriarchy (2006, 50 min.)
- Mosso, the Land of Free Love: Walking Marriage (2006, 50 min.)
- "Frontline World: stories from a small planet" (June 27, 2006, 9 min)
- Kingdom of Women: The Matriarchal Mosuo of China (2007, 54 min.)
- Mosuo Song Journey, by Diedie Weng and Carol Bliss (2007, 37 minutes)
- Kingdom of Women - A Reflection of a Matriarchal Society on Lugu Lake (58 minutes)
- "Taboo: Sex", National Geographic Channel (2008)
- "Free Love," National Geographic Channel (2008)
- "The Fall of Womenland," Director: Xiaodan He (2009)
- Sunny Side of Sex (2011) by Sunny Bergman
- The Mosuo Sisters (2012, 80 min.). A tale of two sisters living in the shadow of two Chinas directed by Marlo Poras.
- "The Land Where Women Rule: Inside China's Last Matriarchy." Broadly staff. 2016. Broadly. October. 2016.

== See also ==
- Chiefdom of Yongning
- Chinese marriage
- Kettu Kalyanam
- List of ethnic groups in China
- List of matrilineal or matrilocal societies
- Lugu Lake
- Matriarchy
- Matrilineality
- Matrilocal residence
- Mosuo women
- Nashi people
- Sambandam
- Yang Erche Namu, a notable Chinese writer, singer and TV star of Mosuo ethnicity

== Bibliography ==
- Barber, Nigel (2014-01-25). "Chinese tribe without marriage points to future". Huffington Post.
- Dashi, Latami (editor). 摩梭社会文化研究论文集 (1960–2005)，云南大学出版社，主编：拉他咪达石
- Gong, Binglin; Yan, Huibin; Yang, Chun-Lei (2015). "Gender Differences in the Dictator Experiment: Evidence from the Matrilineal Mosuo and the Patriarchal Yi". Experimental Economics. 18 (2): 302–313. doi:10.1007/s10683-014-9403-2. S2CID 254461390.
- Hamon, Raeann R.; Ingoldsby, Bron B., eds. (2003). Mate Selection: Across Cultures. Thousand Oaks, CA: Sage Publications.
- Hardenberg, Roland J. (2008). "Die Moso (China) im interkulturellen Vergleich : Möglichkeiten und Grenzen des komparativen Ansatzes in der Ethnologie". Paideuma. 54: 109–127. ISSN 0078-7809.
- Hua, Cai (2001). A Society Without Fathers or Husbands: The Na of China. New York: Zone Books.
- Mattison, Siobhán M.; Scelza, Brooke; Blumenfield, Tami (2014). "Paternal Investment and the Positive Effects of Fathers among the Matrilineal Mosuo of Southwest China". American Anthropologist. 116 (3): 591–610. doi:10.1111/aman.12125.
- Mattison, Siobhán M. (2010). "Economic impacts of tourism and erosion of the visiting system among the Mosuo of Lugu lake". The Asia Pacific Journal of Anthropology. 11 (2): 159–176. doi:10.1080/14442211003730736.
- "Matriarchal/Matrilineal Culture." Matriarchal/Matrilineal Culture. Lugu Lake Mosuo Cultural Development Association, 2006. Web. 25 Oct. 2016.
- Namu, Yang Erche; Mathieu, Christine (2003). Leaving Mother Lake: A Girlhood at the Edge of the World. Boston: Little, Brown. ISBN 978-0-316-12471-3.
- Shih, Chuan-kang (2010). Quest for Harmony: The Moso Traditions of Sexual Union & Family Life. Stanford. ISBN 9780804761994.
- Stacey, Judith (2011). Unhitched: Love, Sex, and Family Values from West Hollywood to Western China. New York: New York University Press. ISBN 978-0-8147-8382-5.
- Stockard, Janice E. (2002). Marriage in Culture: Practice and Meaning Across Diverse Societies. Harcourt. ISBN 9780155063860.
- Ward, Martha; Edenstein, Monica (2009). A World Full of Women. Boston: Pearson.
- Waihong, Choo. The Kingdom of Women: Life, Love and Death in China's Hidden Mountains. I B Tauris, London, 2017, ISBN 978-1-7845-3724-1, ISBN 1-7845-3724-1
- Xu, Duoduo. (2015). A Comparison of the Twenty-Eight Lunar Mansions Between Dabaism and Dongbaism. Archaeoastronomy and Ancient Technologies, 3, 2: 61-81 (links: 1. academia.edu; 2. Archaeoastronomy and Ancient Technologies).
- Xu, Duoduo. (2017). From Daba Script to Dongba Script: A Diachronic Exploration of the History of Moso Pictographic Writings. Libellarium: Journal for the Research of Writing, Books, and Cultural Heritage Institutions, X, 1: 1-47 (Links: 1. Libellarium; 2. academia.edu).
- Yuan, Lu. "Land of the Walking Marriages." Natural History. Ed. Sam Mitchell. N.p.: n.p., n.d. 57–65. Print.

== Further media ==
- Archived at Ghostarchive and the Wayback Machine: "China's Last Matriarchy: The Land Where Women Rule". Vice Asia. 2018-10-23.
