= Daba (religion) =

Daba is the holistic religion and worldview of the Na people, who live in Yunnan, Sichuan and Tibet in China. It is practiced by the Na people, who are commonly known as Mosuo, inaccurately grouped as Nakhi. It is oral and handed down through generations by word of mouth. It holds most of the Na's culture and history. The main clergy of Daba are referred to with the same name as their religion. Na religion includes elements of animism and shamanism.

== Beliefs ==
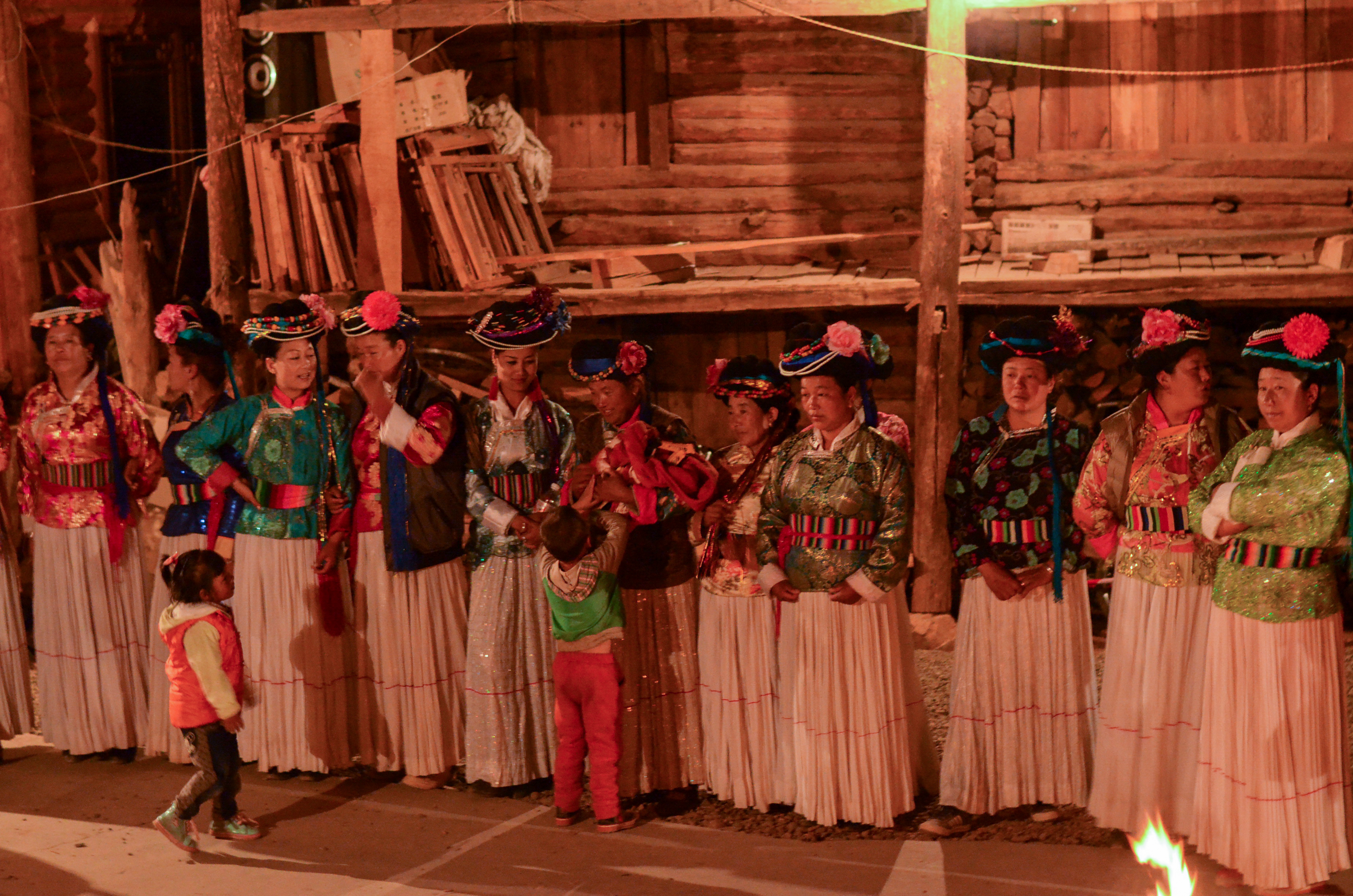
Na folk performance

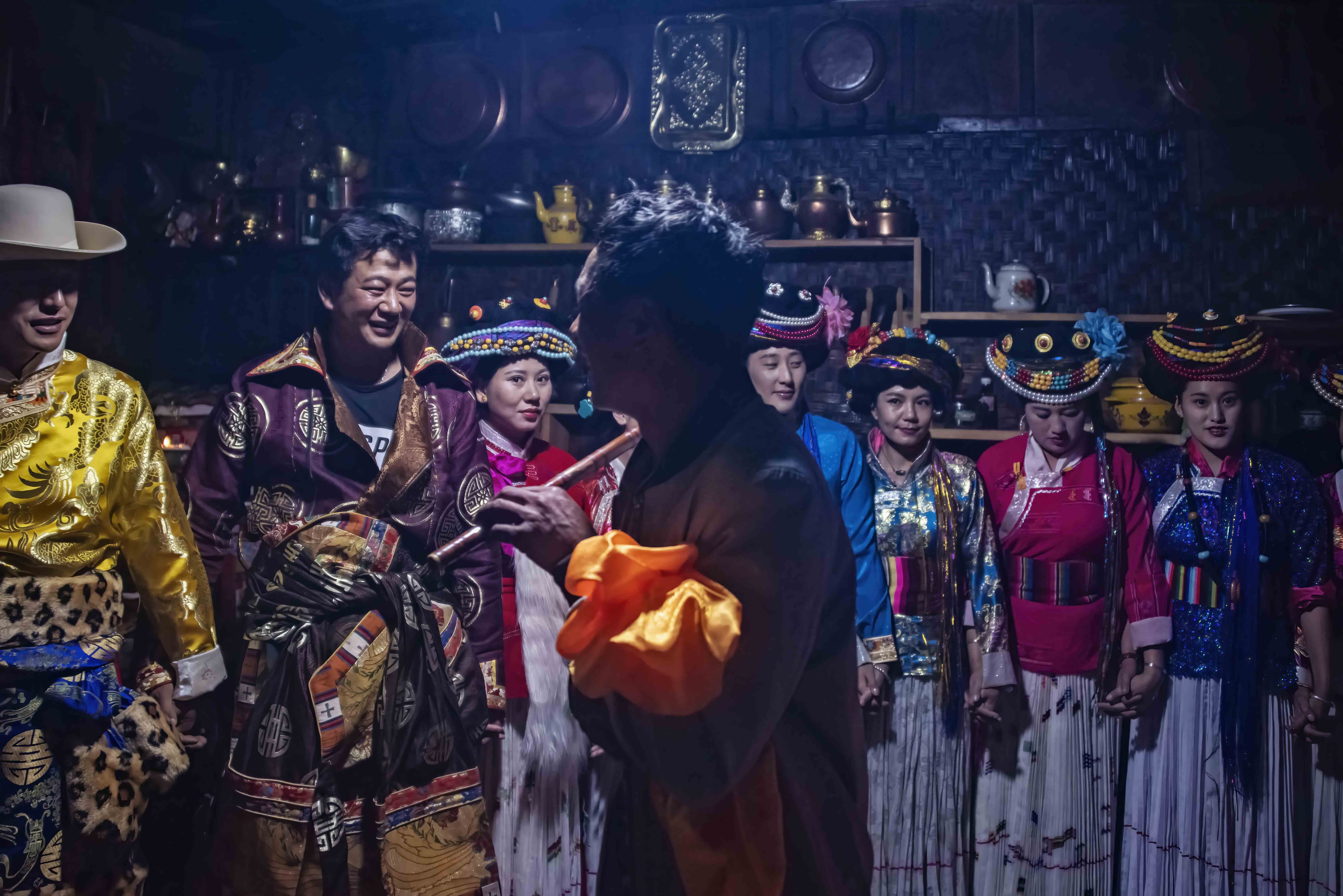
Na Tibetan Buddhist wedding.

The Na worship a variety of animistic spirits. This includes various persons of the natural world, the Na's ancestors and a mother goddess: "The Mosuo are alone among their neighbors to have a guardian mother goddess rather than a patron warrior god." Mountains, lakes and the rest of their environment are described in feminine terms and the vast majority of praise songs involve maternal love. They also worship a mountain goddess known as Gemu.

The Daba priests are the religious leaders of the Na. Their name is a compound of two words: Da which means cutting and Ba which means trace. The compound word is a reference to chopping wood. The Daba's services include being literate priests and shamans for the Na people. They are responsible for preserving the oral tradition of the Na handed down for centuries. Daba priests are obligated to conduct Na rites and ceremonies alongside performing exorcisms, blessing families and assist with the spirits of dead Na. Daba also take care of the sick, handle animal sacrifices and the ceremonial consumption of wine. They drink alcohol until they go into a trance and can talk with spirits. All daba priests are men, and they live in their mother's Awo (their household) with their brothers and sisters. When not pursuing their religious duties, they engage in everyday tasks such as fishing and herding. Although both Buddhist monks and daba priests are exclusively men, women make offerings at household altars dedicated to ancestors or spirits. Na etiquette requires that someone should prostrate themselves three times when meeting a daba priest.

On a day-to-day basis, daba priests play a far smaller role in the lives of the Na. A daba priest is mostly called on to perform traditional ceremonies at key events, such as naming a child, a child's coming-of-age ceremony, a funeral, or special events such as the Spring Festival.

The Na script plays a vital role in their religion, although in most communities it has been lost. Some of the characters are used to determine auspicious and inauspicious days. Sacred stories are written down by daba priests and preserved. The script is written into clothes, letters, scrolls and books to secure blessings.

It has been argued that Daba has much in common with its neighbor Dongba, the traditional religion of the neighboring Nakhi.

== Government repression ==
A cultural crisis is emerging. Due to past Chinese government policies, which made being a daba priest illegal (this policy has now stopped), there are very few remaining daba priests, most of whom are old men. This leads some Na to worry that Na history and heritage may be lost when the current generation of priests are gone. Also, many people are not interesting in being daba priests or using their services preferring to move away and use nontraditional medicine. The oral tradition, passed down through the daba priests, is based on the history and culture of the Na and their Awos. The limitations imposed by the Chinese authorities on the training of new priests, who consider them to be part of an antiquated form of superstition, led to much fewer people being trained for the role. After these government restrictions were ended, the Na have begun training young people to become daba priests again to ensure that their traditions and Awos continue for future generations. For the same reason, a project has also been started to create a writing system for the language, which requires a long time to implement.

== Syncretism with Tibetan Buddhism ==
Over the centuries, Daba been influenced by Tibetan Buddhism. It was introduced to the Na people between the end of the Song dynasty (960–1279) and the beginning of the Yuan dynasty (1271–1368). The most prominent school of Tibetan Buddhism is Gelug, which was introduced to the Na during the Qing dynasty (1644–1911).

Buddhist influence has grown in recent years. Although today Tibetan Buddhism is the predominant religion, it still has been syncretized with Daba. Like the Buddhist population of Tibet, both lay and monastic Buddhists among the Na eat meat. Na lamas offer prayers of thanks, prayers for the dead, basic religious and secular education to young children, and counsel adults. In families with more than one son, one will often be sent to be a monk and in recent years, the number of such monks has grown significantly. Many Daba ceremonies involving the recitation of several dozen sutras. The Na have their own "living Buddha", a man said to be a reincarnation of one of the great Tibetan spiritual leaders. He usually lives in Lijiang but rarely returns to a Tibetan temple in Yongning for important holidays. He died of old age in April 2011.

In most Na homes, a statue of some Buddhist deity can be found above the cooking fire. The family will usually put a small portion of whatever they are cooking in the fire, as an offering to their deity. Tibetan Buddhist holidays and festivals are participated in by the entire Na community.

Although Buddhism has come to dominate Na religious life, the daba priests are still called upon to deal with dangerous spirits. During funerals Buddhist monks preside over the cremation of the dead while the Daba priests are responsible for directing the soul of the deceased to Seba'anawa, the afterworld of the Na.

== See also ==
- Bon
- Chinese folk religion
- Dingba
- Wuism
