= Jade Water Village =

Jade Water Village 玉水寨
- Natural Village
- Location in Yunnan
- Coordinates: 27.000441°N 100.120461°E
- Country: People's Republic of China
- Province: Yunnan
- Prefecture-level City: Lijiang
- County: Yulong Naxi Autonomous County
- Town: Baisha
- Elevation: 2,500 m (8,200 ft)

Jade Water Village (Chinese: 玉水寨; pinyin: Yùshuǐzhài) is a natural village in the town of Baisha, Yulong Naxi Autonomous County, Lijiang, Yunnan, China. The village serves as a Dongba cultural centre, and a home to Nakhi people. The village is near Jade Dragon Snow Mountain.

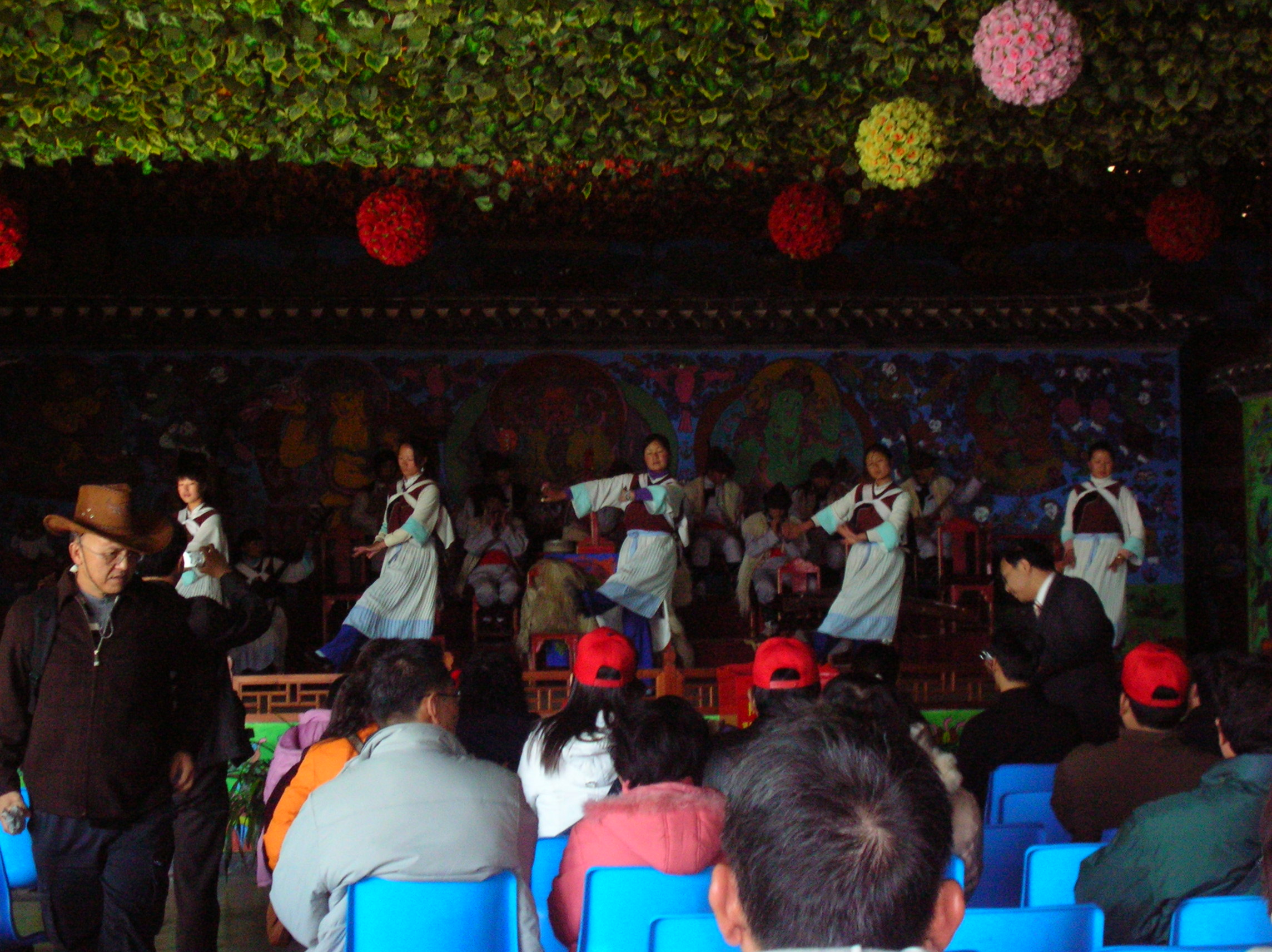
A dance item at its cultural centre.

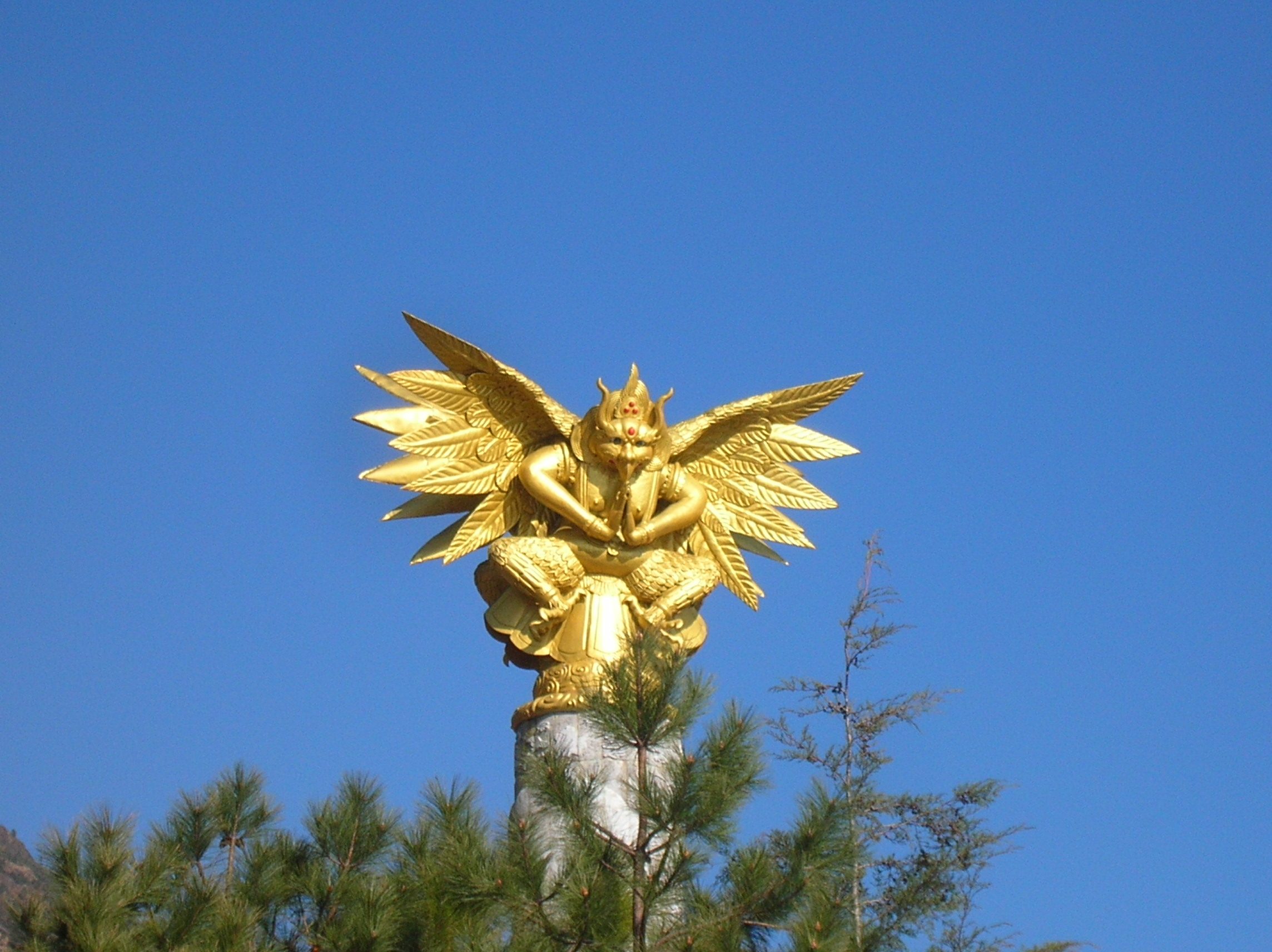
The statue of a bird immortal sacred to the Naxi people.

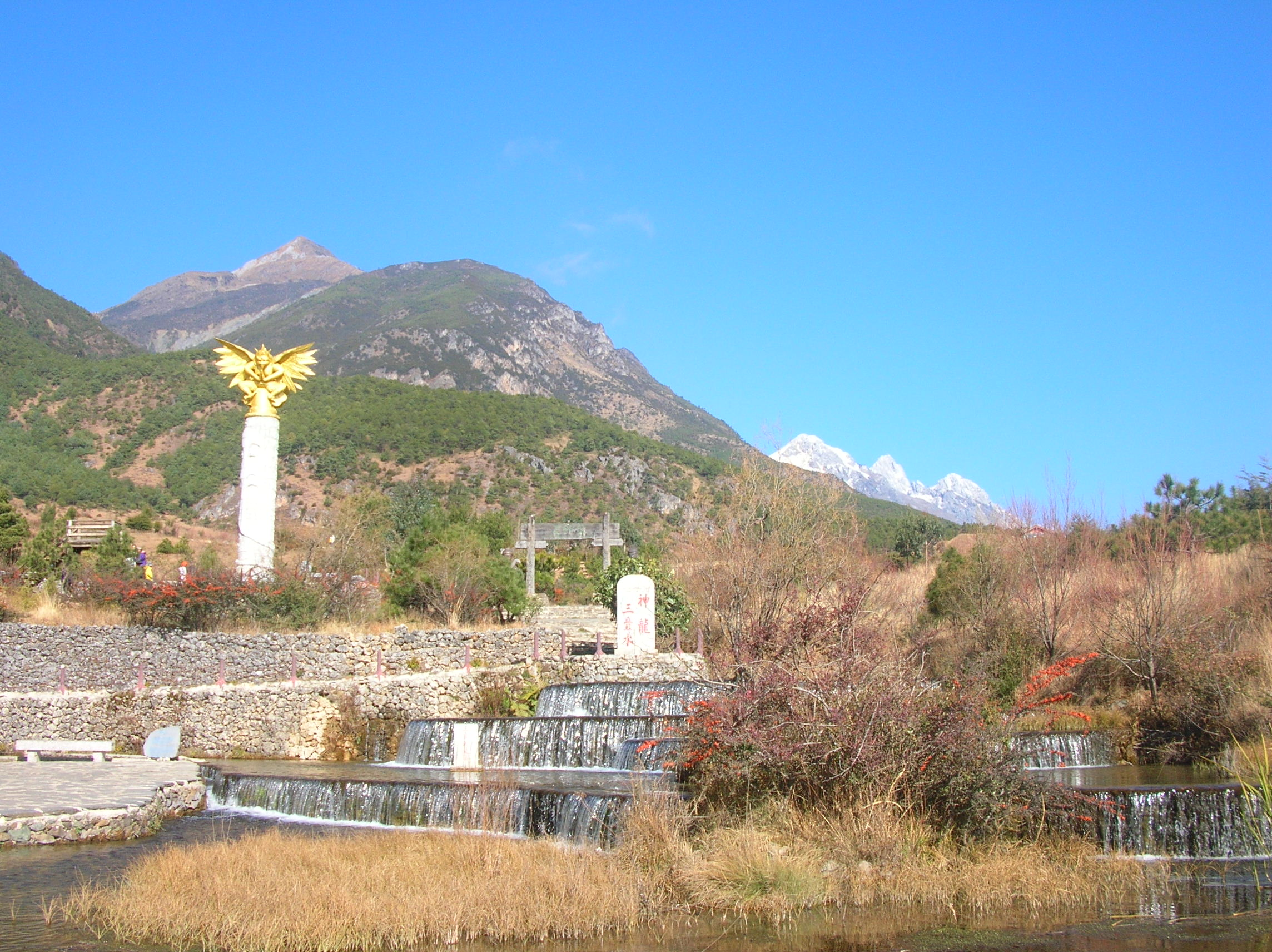
The exit of the Jade Water village, with Jade Dragon Snow Mountain (right) in the background.

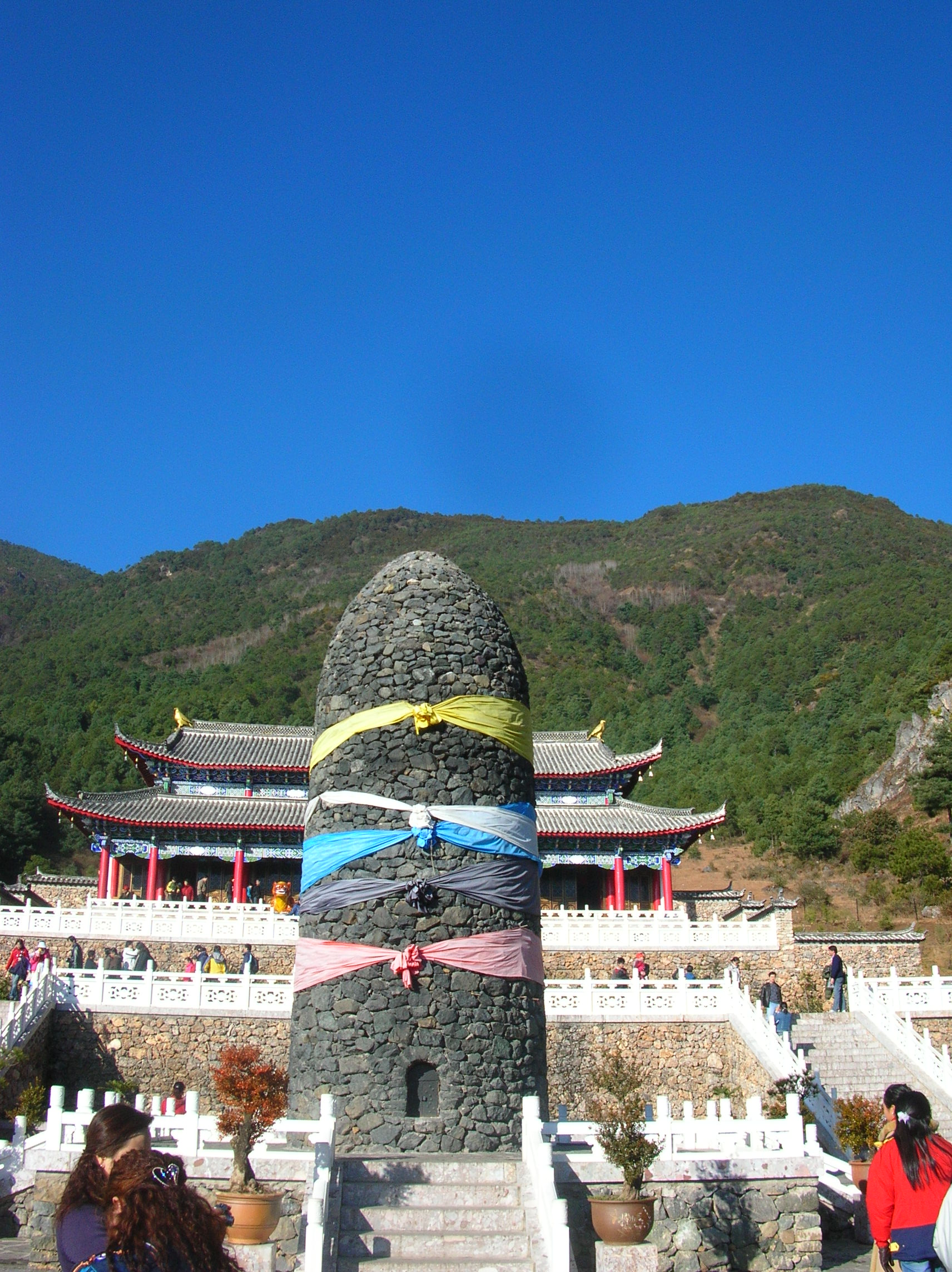
A furnace at the village, near the sacrificial ground.

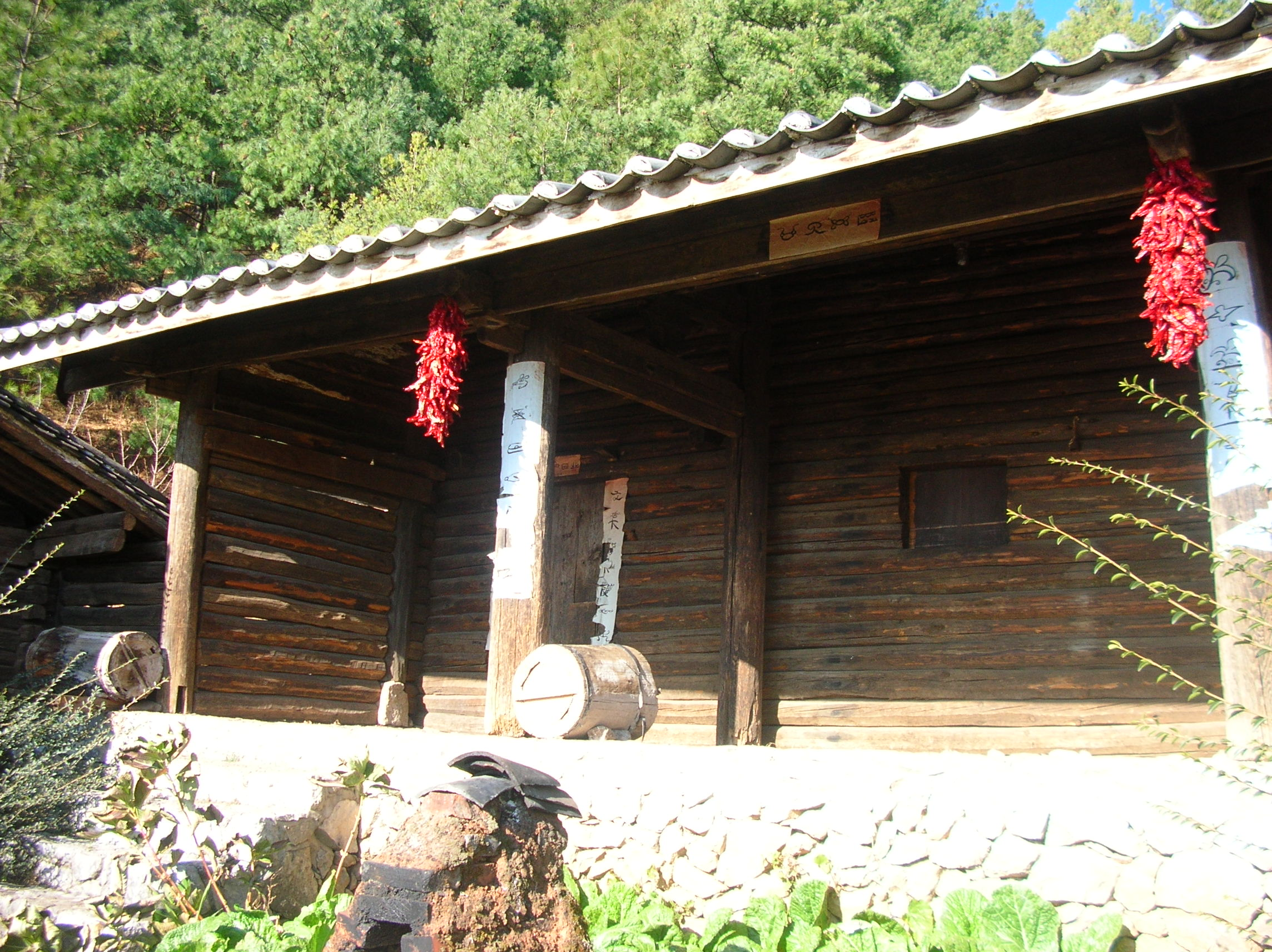
A house at the village. Seen hanging outside are bunches of dried chili.
