= Daju =

Daju may refer to:

- Daju languages, a group of Nilo-Saharan languages spoken by the Daju people
- Daju people, an ethnic group of Sudan
- Daju kingdom
- Daju (town), a town in Lijiang Prefecture, Yunnan Province, China
