= Jade Dragon Snow Mountain =

Small mountain range in China

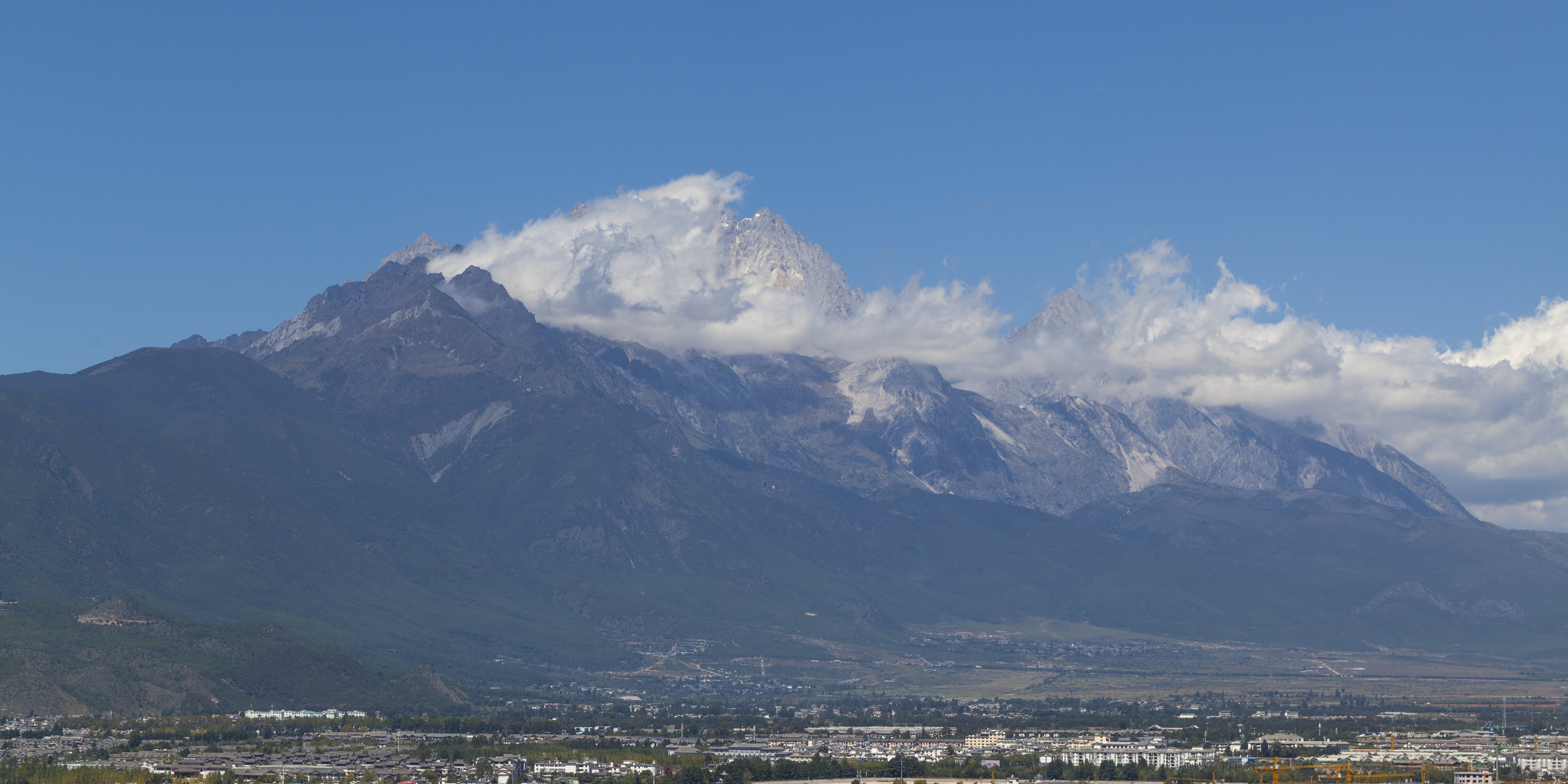
- Jade Dragon Snow Mountain towering over nearby Lijiang

Highest point
- Elevation: 5,596 m (18,360 ft)
- Prominence: 3,202 m (10,505 ft); Ranked 71st
- Listing: Ultra
- Coordinates: 27°05′54″N 100°10′30″E

Geography
- Location within Yunnan
- Location: Yulong Naxi Autonomous County, Yunnan
- Parent range: Yun Range

Climbing
- First ascent: 1987 by Phil Peralta-Ramos and Eric Perlman
- Easiest route: East side: snow/rock climb

Jade Dragon Snow Mountain (simplified Chinese: 玉龙雪山; traditional Chinese: 玉龍雪山; pinyin: Yùlóng Xuěshān; Naxi: Jingv'lv or Ngv'lv bbei jjuq) is a mountain massif or small mountain range in Yulong Naxi Autonomous County, Lijiang, in Yunnan province, China. Its highest peak is named Shanzidou or Shan-Tzu-tou (扇子陡) and it is 5,596 m (18,360 ft) above sea level.

== Etymology ==
The Chinese name, Yùlóng Xuěshān, translates directly as Jade Dragon Snow Mountain; it is sometimes translated as Mount Yulong or Yulong Snow Mountain. The mountain's Naxi name is Mount Satseto.

== Geography ==
The Jade Dragon Snow Mountain massif forms the bulk of the larger Yulong Mountains, which stretch further north. The mountain is covered in snow year-round.The northwestern flank of the massif forms one side of the Tiger Leaping Gorge (Hǔtiào Xiá, 虎跳峡), which has a popular trekking route on the other side. In this gorge, the Jinsha (upper Yangtze) River descends dramatically between Jade Dragon and Haba Snow Mountain. The Yulong Mountains lie to the south of the Yun Range and are part of Southwest China's greater Hengduan Mountains. The mountain also supports a diverse animal and plant population, thanks to its varied environmental factors.

Settlements surrounding Jade Dragon Snow Mountain include Baisha Town to the south, Longpan Township to the west, Daju Township to the northeast, and Jade Water Village at the foot of the mountain to the east.

== Exploration history ==
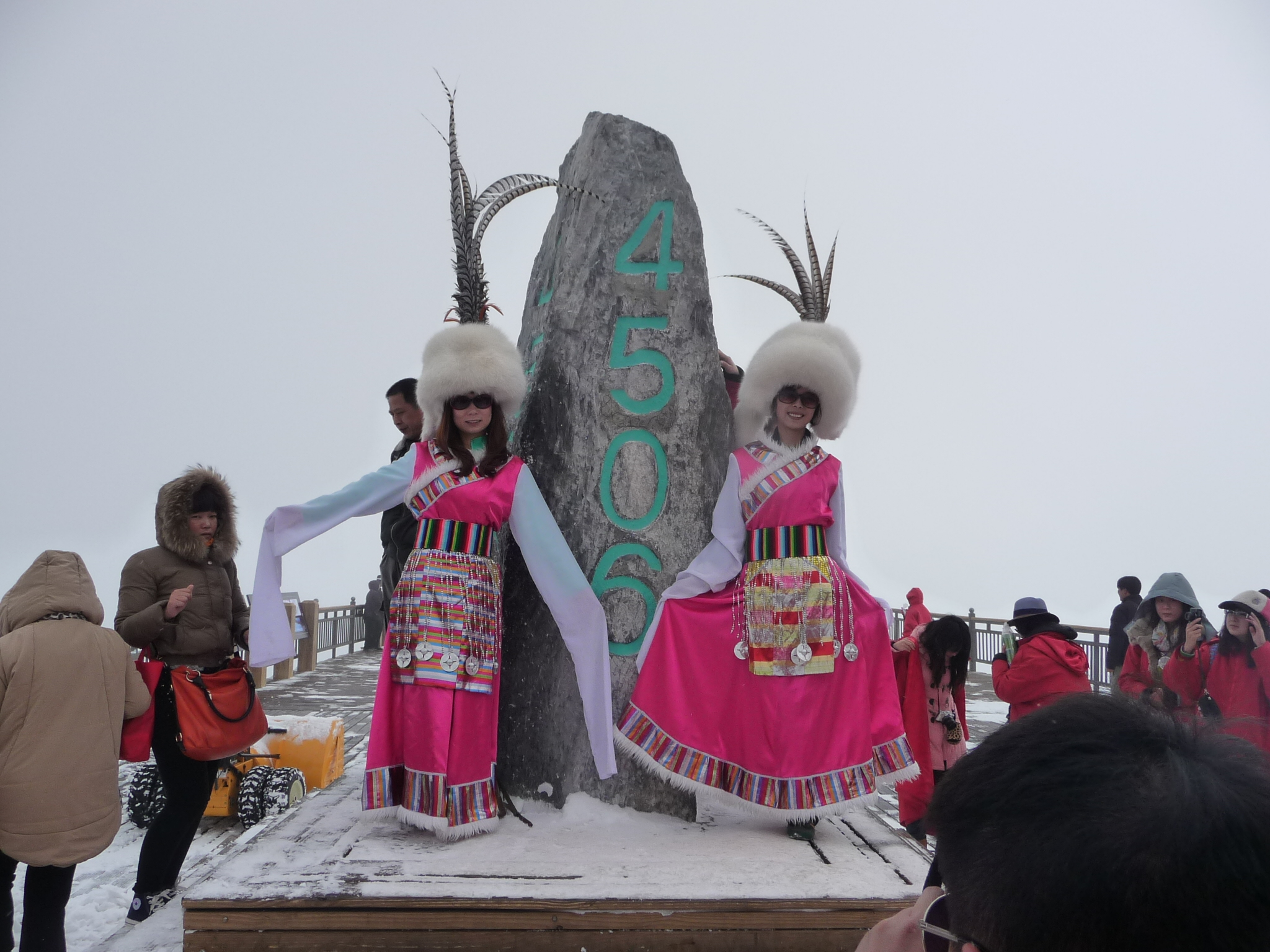
High on Jade Dragon Snow Mountain, tourists frolic (2013)

Marie Byles, the Australian lawyer, feminist, conservationist, and mountaineer, led an expedition to the mountain in 1938, accompanied by five others who included Dora de Beer, Mick Bowie, and Marjorie Edgar-Jones. They failed to reach the summit due to bad weather. Byles was bitterly disappointed by this failure, and she subsequently became a Buddhist.

Shanzidou has been climbed only once, on May 8, 1987, by an American expedition. The summit team comprised Phil Peralta-Ramos and Eric Perlman. They climbed snow gullies and limestone headwalls and encountered high avalanche danger and sparse opportunities for protection. They rated the maximum technical difficulty of the rock at YDS 5.7.

The Austro-American botanist and explorer Joseph Rock spent many years living in the vicinity of Mt. Satseto and wrote about the region and the Naxi people who occupy it. An interest in Rock later drew the travel writer Bruce Chatwin to the mountain, which he wrote about in an article that appeared in The New York Times and later, retitled, in his essay collection What Am I Doing Here?. Chatwin's article inspired many subsequent travellers, including Michael Palin, to visit the region.

== Tourism ==
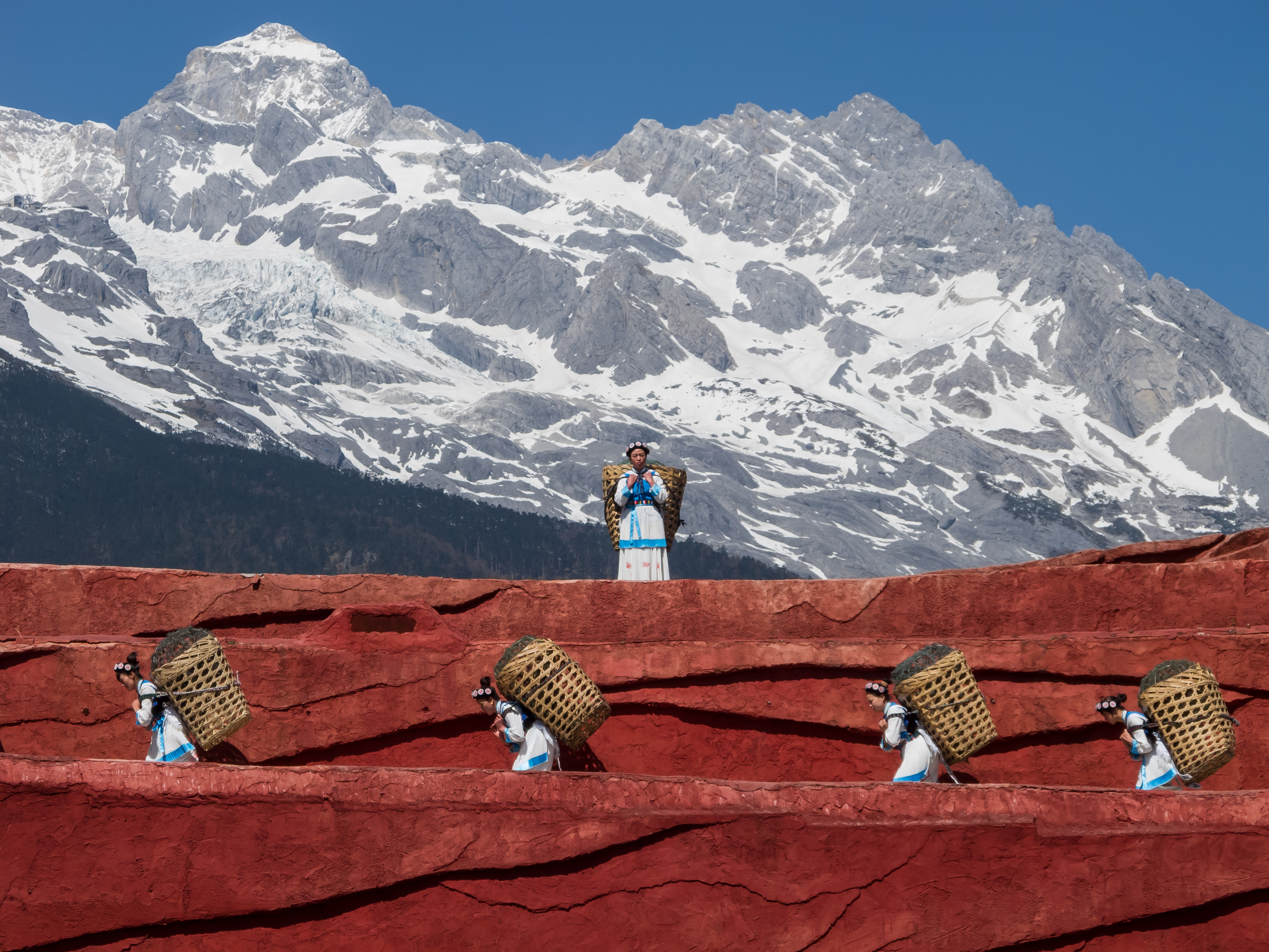
Public performance in Jade Dragon Snow Mountain Open Air Theatre.

The view of the massif from the gardens at the Black Dragon Pool (Heilong Tan) in Lijiang is noted as one of China's finest views. The mountain is part of Yulong Snow Mountain National Scenic Area and National Geological Park, an AAAAA-classified scenic area. The Park operates a tourist cable car that climbs to an observation platform at an elevation of 4,506 m (14,783 ft). There is also another higher observation platform, one of the highest in the world, at an elevation of 4,680 m (15,350 ft) for close views of the snow peak. Due to the extremely high elevation, many people become oxygen-starved and carry cans of compressed oxygen to help. Some have criticized the cable for accelerating the melting of the snow and reducing the water retention by the mountain.

The mountain was featured on Episode 4 of The Amazing Race 18.

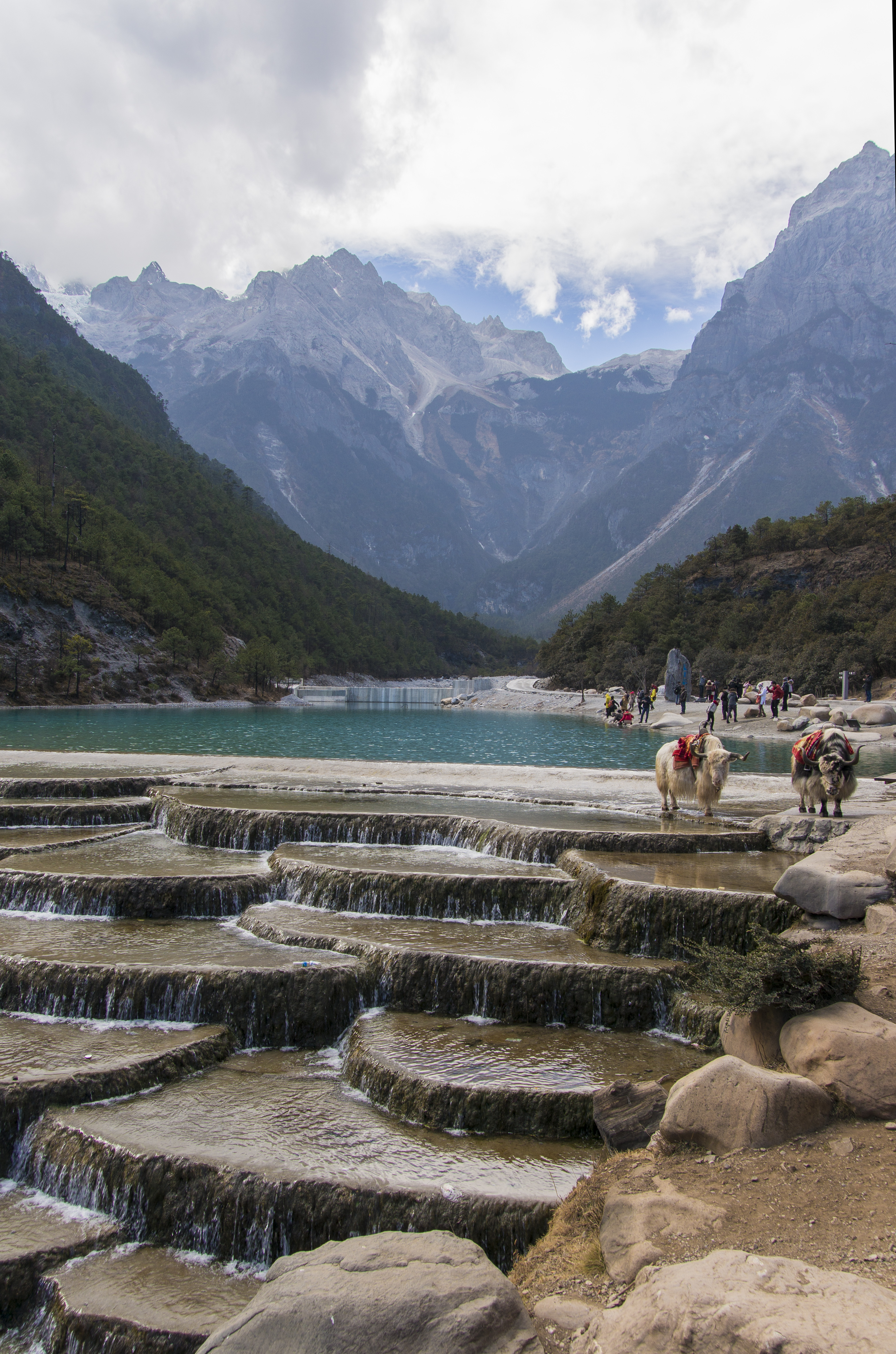
Yak and cascading pools with the mountain in the background

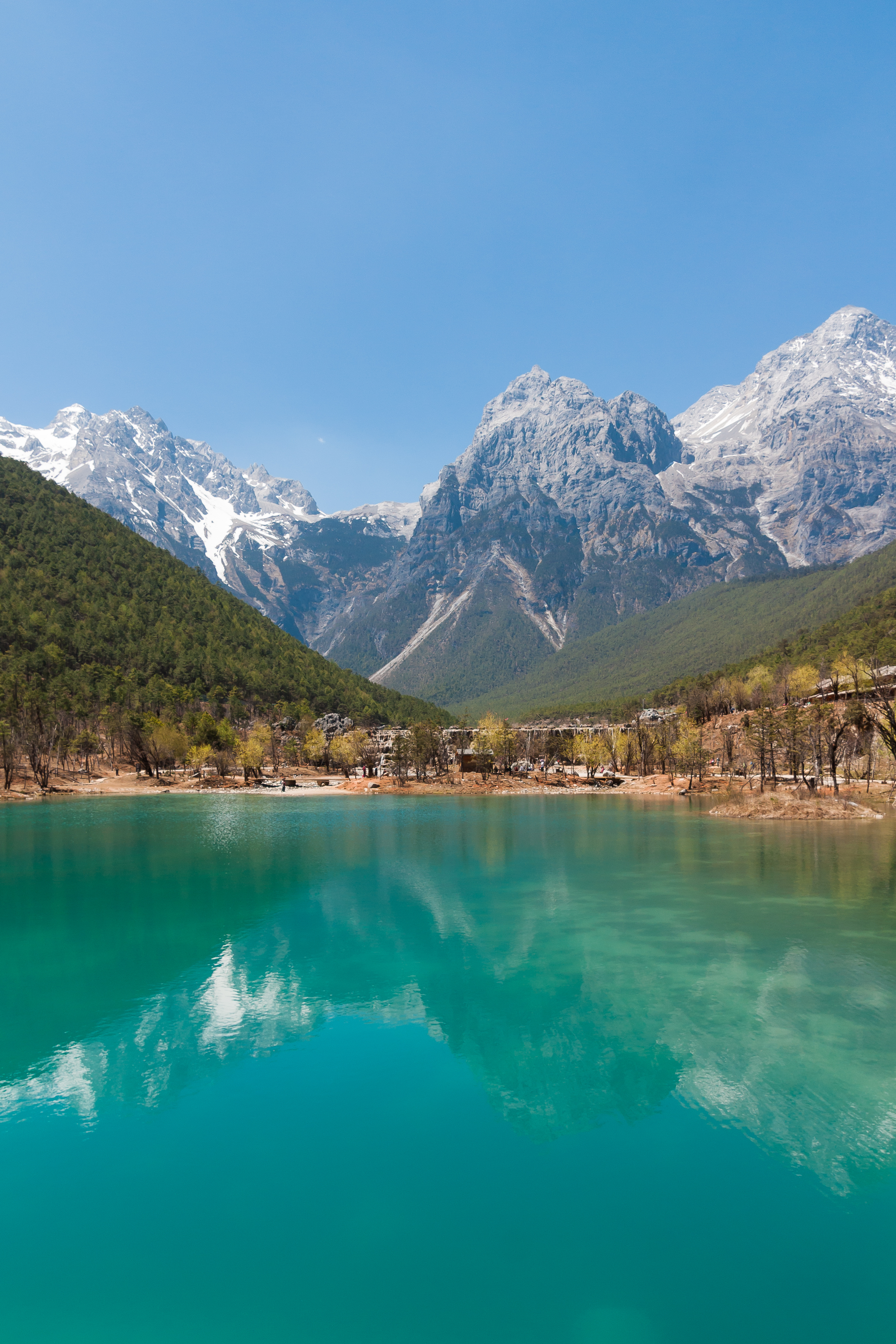
View of Jade Dragon Mountain

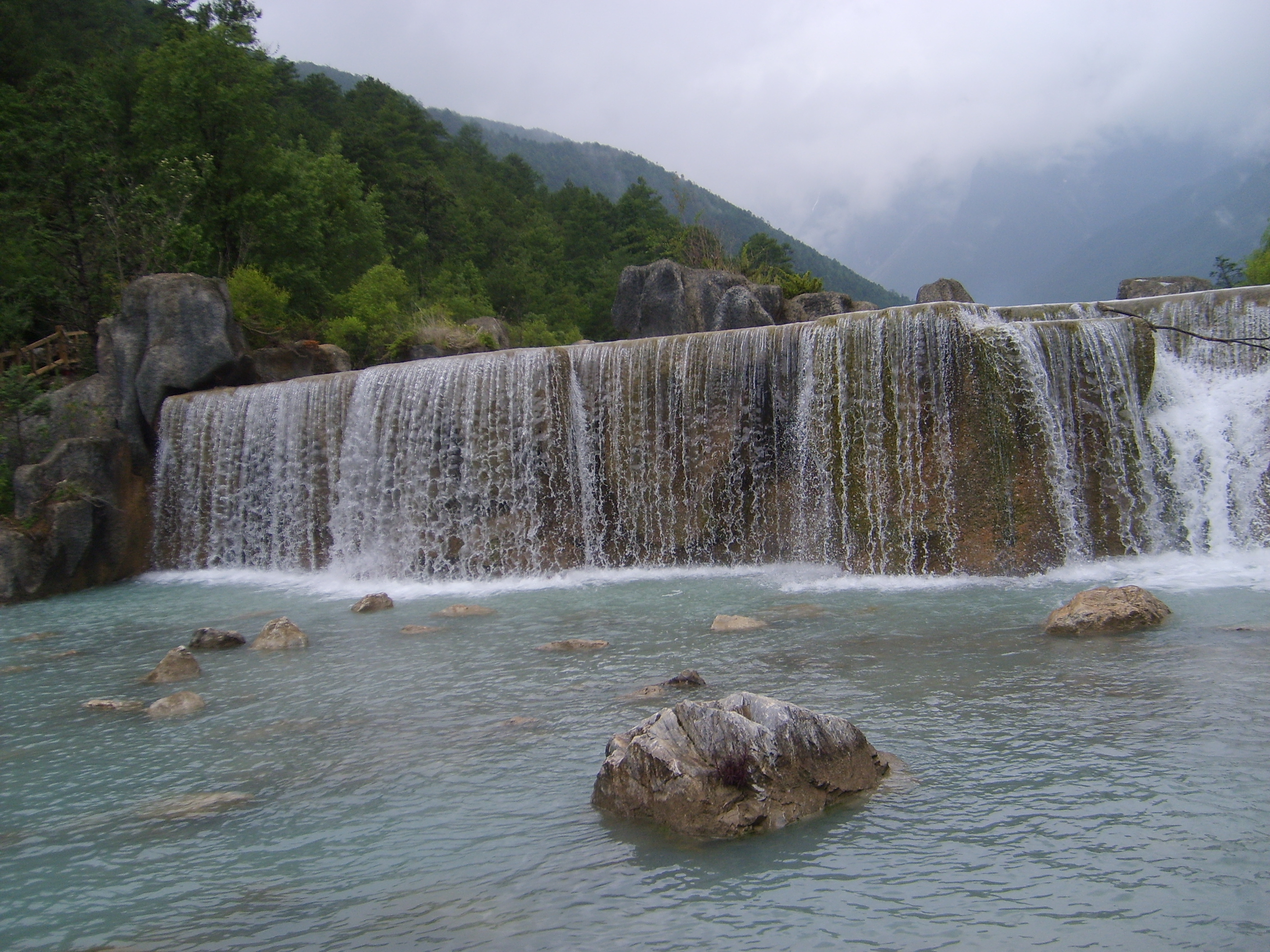
Yulong Snow Mountain Waterfall

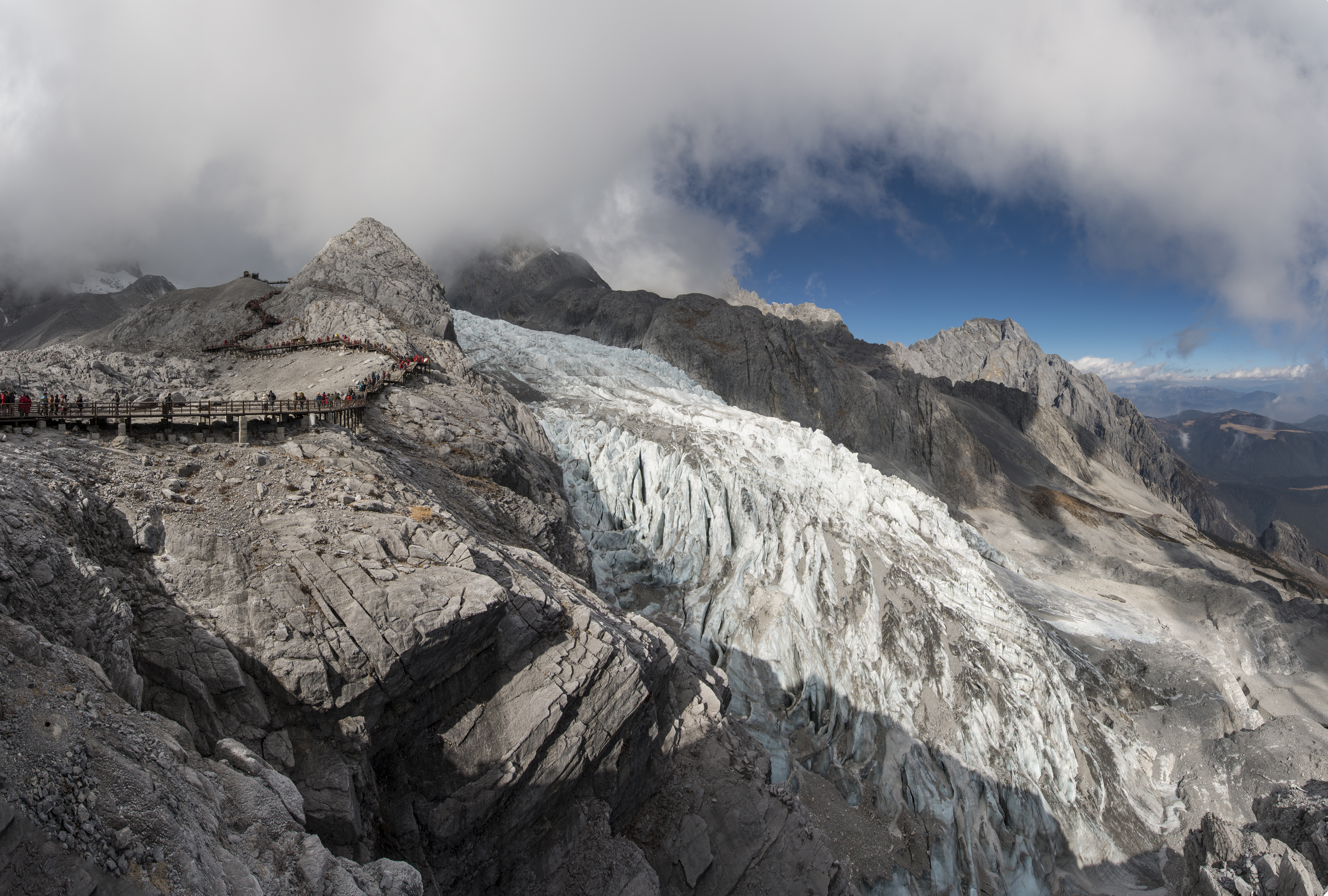
Glacier on top of the mountain

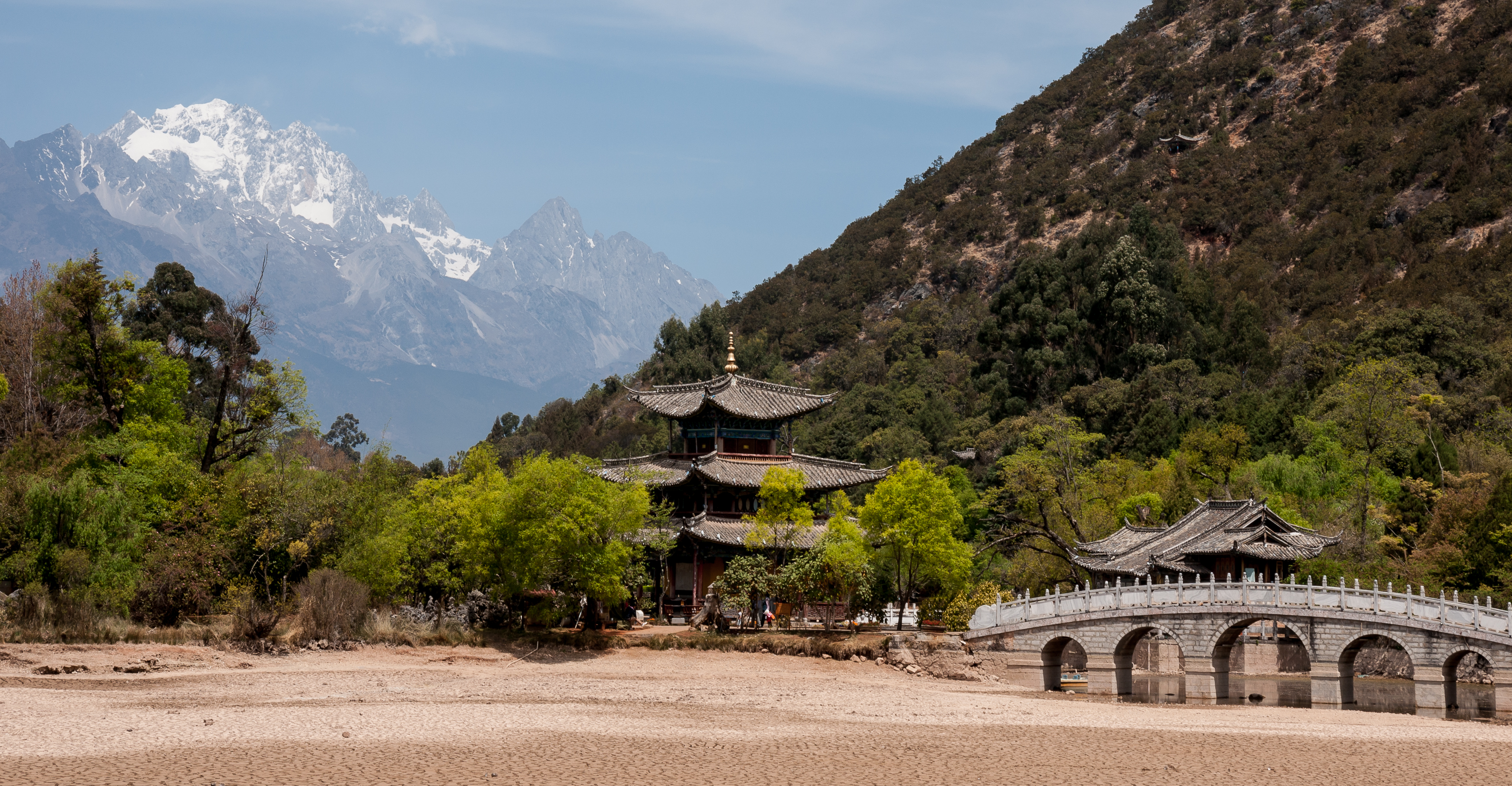
Yunnan Black-Dragon-Pool

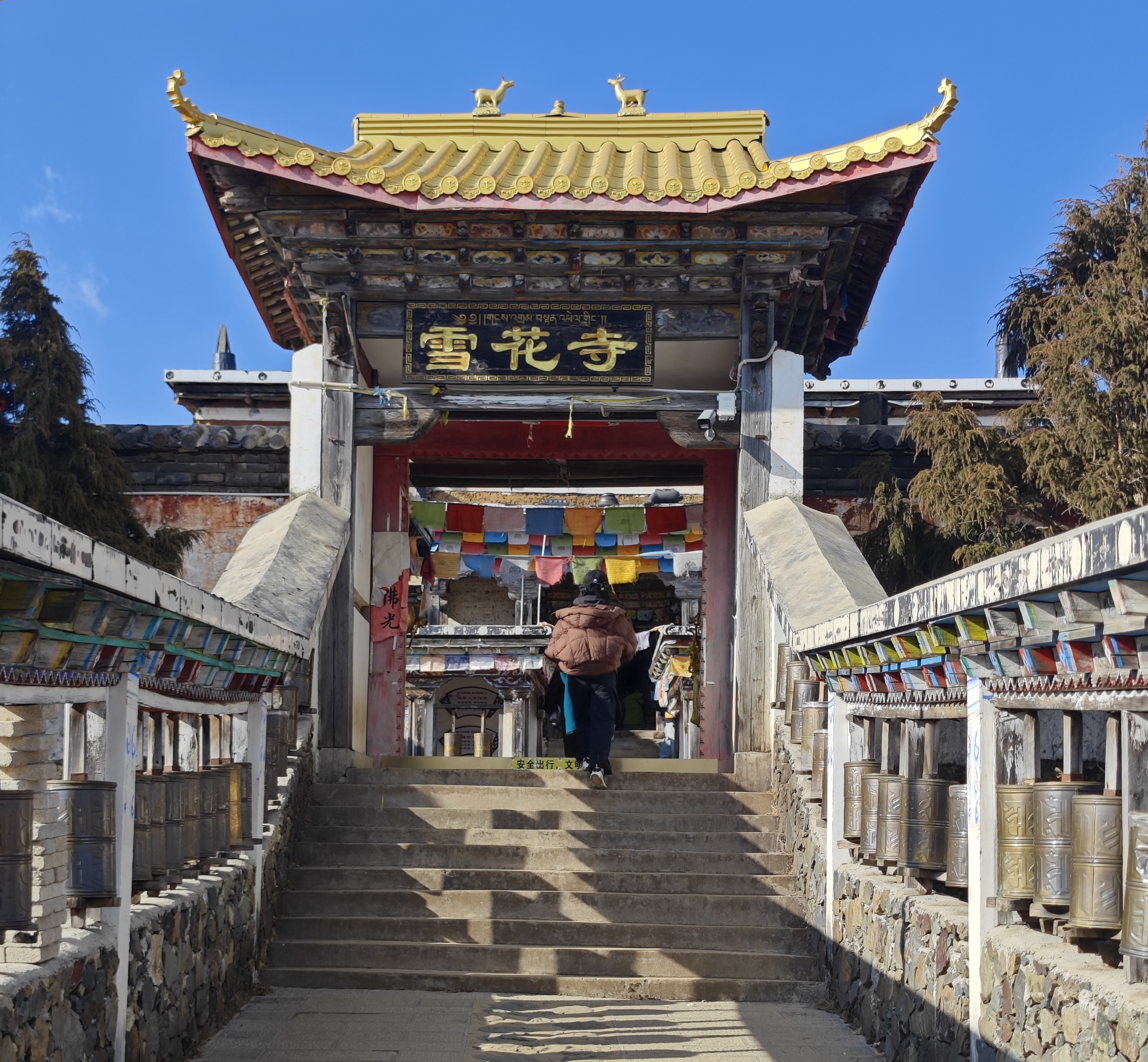
Xuehua Temple

== See also ==
- List of ultras of Tibet, East Asia and neighbouring areas
