= Wenhai =

Coordinates: 26.983811°N 100.169391°E

Wenhai is a village in Lijiang, Yunnan province in China. It is located on the southern slope of Yulong (Jade Dragon) snow mountain and it is a part of the Lashihai provincial level Alpine Wetlands Nature Reserve.

== Climate ==
The elevation at Wenhai is 3,100 meters. The unique climate and soil in the area nourished a variety of vegetative covers and plant species. Including old-growth forests, shrubs and meadows. There are also unique wild flowers that bloom all four seasons. Including over twenty species of rhododendrons. Wenhai is also home to a variety of economically viable mushrooms and precious medicinal herbs.

The Wenhai lake is a seasonal alpine lake and wetland throughout the Spring and Summer. The Wenhai lake basin is one big grazing ground with various little streams winding through the grassland. During every July and August when the rain season arrives, water begins to rise in Wenhai, and the lake is usually filled up by October. Then during the winter season, Wenhai water level lowers again until March of the next year. Then, the entire lake is emptied of water, when the basin turns into a grassland again. Every year between November and January of the next year, birds from as far as Siberia and Qinghai come to Wenhai to rest, creating a great opportunity for bird watching in the area.

== Residents ==
The Naxi people, the main ethnic group in Lijiang, have lived in Wenhai for over 300 years. North of the Wenhai villages is the Xuehua village where there lives a group of Yi people, who still maintain their traditional lifestyle.
