= Black Dragon Pool =

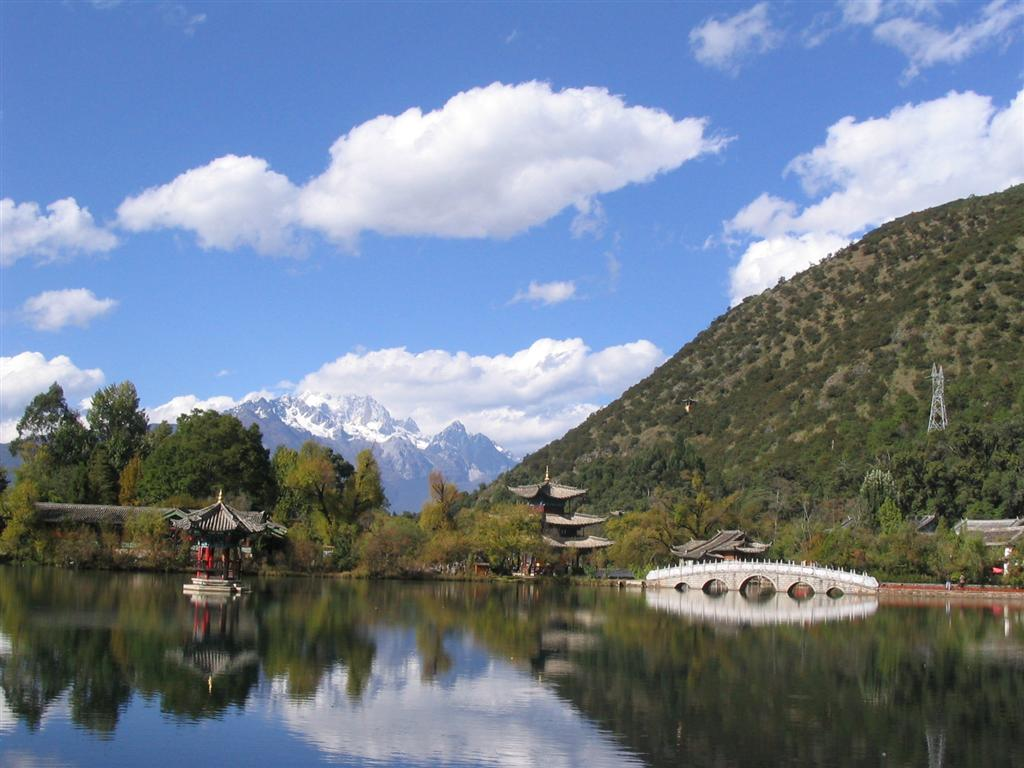
- Black Dragon Pool

- Location within Yunnan
- Location: Lijiang, Yunnan
- Coordinates: 26°53′15.39″N 100°13′59.79″E
- Type: lake

Black Dragon Pool (simplified Chinese: 黑龙潭; traditional Chinese: 黑龍潭; pinyin: Hēilóngtán) is a famous pond in the scenic Jade Spring Park (Yu Quan Gong Yuan) located at the foot of Elephant Hill, a short walk north of the Old Town of Lijiang in Yunnan province, China. It was built in 1737 during the Qing dynasty and offers views of the region's tallest mountain, Jade Dragon Snow Mountain, over its white marble bridge.

In the past, the pool itself has sometimes been dry, spoiling the famous view. In 2010, however, the park was declared a water conservation area by the local government. As of 2014, the pool stood full of water.

The park features several smaller temples and pavilions:

- The Moon-Embracing Pavilion (simplified Chinese: 得月楼; traditional Chinese: 得月樓; pinyin: Déyuè Lóu), originally built in the late Ming dynasty. The current structure is a 1963 reproduction following a 1950 fire.
- The Longshen Temple (simplified Chinese: 龙神寺; traditional Chinese: 龍神寺), also known as Dragon God Temple, was constructed by local Naxi people in 1737 and is located to the east of the park. It was given the name Dragon God of Jade Spring by the Qianlong Emperor of the Qing dynasty in the same year.
- The threefold overlap Five-Phoenix Tower (Wufeng Tower) was built during the Ming Dynasty (1601), and today is located at the north end of the park. The tower was originally located at the Fuguo Temple, 30 kilometres (19 mi) to the west, but was moved to Jade Spring Park in 1979.
- Forest of Stele (simplified in Chinese: 碑林, pinyin: bēi lín) is the treasure house of Naxi culture. It comprises more than 50 famous steles from the Tang Dynasty to the Republic of China and has high historical value.

The park is further home to the Dongba Culture Research Institute and the Dongba Culture Museum.

== History ==
The ancient buildings in the Heilongtan Scenic Area were first built in the second year of the Qianlong reign of the Qing Dynasty (1737 AD). In 1999, it was announced as the first batch of cultural relics protection units in Lijiang. 2006, it was announced as the sixth batch of national key cultural relics protection units. The cultural relics points are Wenmingfang (i.e., the gate of Heilongtan Park), Suocui Bridge, Deyue Tower, and Dragon God Temple. There are nine buildings: Guangbi Tower, Yiwen Pavilion, Wufeng Tower, Jiejie Linmen Tower, and Stage. Five buildings, Jiejie Linmen Tower, Wufeng Tower, Guangbi Tower, Yiwen Pavilion, and Wenmingfang, were moved here from other places. In 2009, it was rated as a national 4A tourist attraction.
