= Quercus marlipoensis =

Conservation status
- Critically Endangered (IUCN 3.1)

Scientific classification
- Kingdom: Plantae
- Clade: Embryophytes
- Clade: Tracheophytes
- Clade: Spermatophytes
- Clade: Angiosperms
- Clade: Eudicots
- Clade: Rosids
- Order: Fagales
- Family: Fagaceae
- Genus: Quercus
- Subgenus: Quercus subg. Cerris
- Section: Quercus sect. Ilex
- Species: Q. marlipoensis

Binomial name
- Quercus marlipoensis Hu & W.C.Cheng

Species of flowering plant

Quercus marlipoensis is a species of oak. It is a tree endemic to Yunnan Province in south-central China. It is a medium-sized oak which grows in montane mixed evergreen cloud forest from 1,700 to 1,900 metres elevation. The forest is dominated by broadleaf trees of family Fagaceae, including species of Lithocarpus, Castanopsis, and Quercus sect. Cyclobalanopsis, along with species of Magnolia. It is known from a single location in Xia-Jin-Chan village of Malipo County, in the Laojun-Shan National Nature Reserve. A 2021 survey counted 64 mature individuals growing in close proximity to each other.

The species was described by Hu Xiansu and Wan-Chun Cheng in 1951.
