= Gucheng, Lijiang =

Gucheng 古城区
- District
- Location of Gucheng District (red) and Lijiang City (pink) in Yunnan

- Location within China Gucheng (China)
- Coordinates: 26°50′51″N 100°18′58″E
- Country: China
- Province: Yunnan
- Prefecture-level city: Lijiang
- District seat: Dayan Subdistrict

Area
  - Total: 1,127 km^{2} (435 sq mi)

Population (2020 census)
  - Total: 288,787
  - Density: 256.2/km^{2} (663.7/sq mi)
- Postal code: 674100
- Area code: 0888
- Climate: Cwa
- Website: www.ljgucheng.gov.cn

Gucheng District (Chinese: 古城区; pinyin: Gǔchéng Qū; lit. 'old city') is a county-level district located in Lijiang City Prefecture, Yunnan, China. It borders Ninglang County and Yongsheng County to the east, Heqing County to the south, and Yulong County to the north and west.

Its county seat is the town of Dayan (大研镇), otherwise known as the old town of Lijiang.

== Administrative divisions ==
Gucheng District has 7 subdistricts, 2 towns, 1 township and 1 ethnic township.

7 subdistricts

- Xi'an (西安街道)
- Dayan (大研街道)
- Xianghe (祥和街道)
- Shuhe (束河街道)
- Jinshan (金山街道)
- Kainan (开南街道)
- Wenhua (文化街道)

2 towns

- Jin'an (金安镇)
- Qihe (七河镇)

1 township

- Dadong (大东乡)

1 ethnic township

- Jinjiang Bai Ethnic Township (金江白族乡)
