= Daju, Lijiang =

Township in Yunnan, China

Coordinates: 27°18′14″N 100°14′56″E

Daju 大具乡
- Township
- Interactive map of Daju
- Country: China
- Province: Yunnan
- Prefecture: Lijang
- County: Yulong
- Time zone: UTC+8 (CST)
- Geography: North of Yangtze River, near Tiger Leaping Gorge

Daju (Chinese: 大具乡; pinyin: Dàjù Xiāng) is a township in Yulong Naxi Autonomous County, Lijiang Prefecture, Yunnan province, China.

It is located just above the eastern end of Tiger Leaping Gorge to the south of the Yangtze River.
