= Mount Laojun (Yunnan) =

Mountain in Yunnan Province, China

Laojun Mountain
- Location within China

Highest point
- Coordinates: 26°52′57″N 99°36′34″E

Geography
- Location: Yunnan, China

Laojun Mountain (Chinese: 老君山; pinyin: Lǎojūn Shān) is a mountain in the northwest part of Yunnan Province, China. It is part of the Laojun Mountain region, which includes an area of 1,085 square kilometres (419 sq mi) with elevations ranging from 2,100 to 4,513 metres (6,890 to 14,806 ft). The region includes four counties: Yulong, Jianchuan, Lanping, and Weixi. The western part of the region adjoins the Lancang River, while the eastern part is contiguous with the Jinsha River. The region was included in the Three Parallel Rivers UNESCO World Heritage Site in 2003, and the Laojun Mountain National Park was announced in January 2009.

== Conservation ==
Laojun Mountain region is a biodiversity hotspot. Laojun Mountain has over 170 species of macrofungi (mushrooms), about 10% of all rhododendrons in the world, and it is one of the few remaining places where the endangered Yunnan snub-nosed monkey (Rhinopithecus bieti) can be found. In 2015, TNC established a conservancy program on the mountain, in Liju village, concerning the animal. It offers business opportunities and training to local residents, to provide alternatives to poaching and logging, in order to protect the monkeys.

== See also ==
- List of mountains in China
