= Yun Range =

Mountain range in Yunnan, China

Highest point
- Peak: Shanzidou, Jade Dragon Snow Mountain
- Coordinates: 27.098°N 100.177°E

Geography
- Country: China
- Provinces: Sichuan, Yunnan and Tibet Autonomous Region
- Parent range: Hengduan Mountains

The Yun Range (Chinese: 雲嶺; pinyin: Yún Lǐng; lit. 'Cloudy Peaks') are a mountain range running north–south in northwestern Yunnan province, China. They were formerly romanized as the Yun Ling and tautologically as the Yun-ling Mountains. The Yun Range runs between the Lancang River (Mekong) to the west and Jinsha River (Yangtze) to the east. The range is a major component of the greater Hengduan Mountains.

In historic times, the Yun Ling referred more broadly to all mountains south and west of the Sichuan Basin. At times, the name was applied to the Min Mountains, Qionglai Mountains, Daxue Mountains and other ranges in the Hengduan Mountains. In this context the province of Yunnan, meaning "south of cloud [mountains]", was named after the Yun Range.

The Yunling Mountains Nature Reserve in Lanping County in Nujiang Prefecture is part of the Three Parallel Rivers of Yunnan Protected Areas and a habitat for the endangered black snub-nosed monkey.
