= Baisha, Yunnan =

Baisha 白沙镇
- Town
- Location in Yunnan
- Coordinates: 26°57′26″N 100°12′54″E
- Country: People's Republic of China
- Province: Yunnan
- Prefecture-level city: Lijiang
- Autonomous county: Yulong Naxi Autonomous County
- Time zone: UTC+8 (China Standard)

Baisha (Chinese: 白沙) is a town of Yulong Naxi Autonomous County, Yunnan, China. As of 2018, it has 5 villages under its administration.
