= Yulong Naxi Autonomous County =

Yulong County 玉龙县 · Yulleq Xail
- Autonomous county
- Yulong Naxi Autonomous County 玉龙纳西族自治县; Yulleq Naqxiceef Zeeqzheeqxail (Naxi)
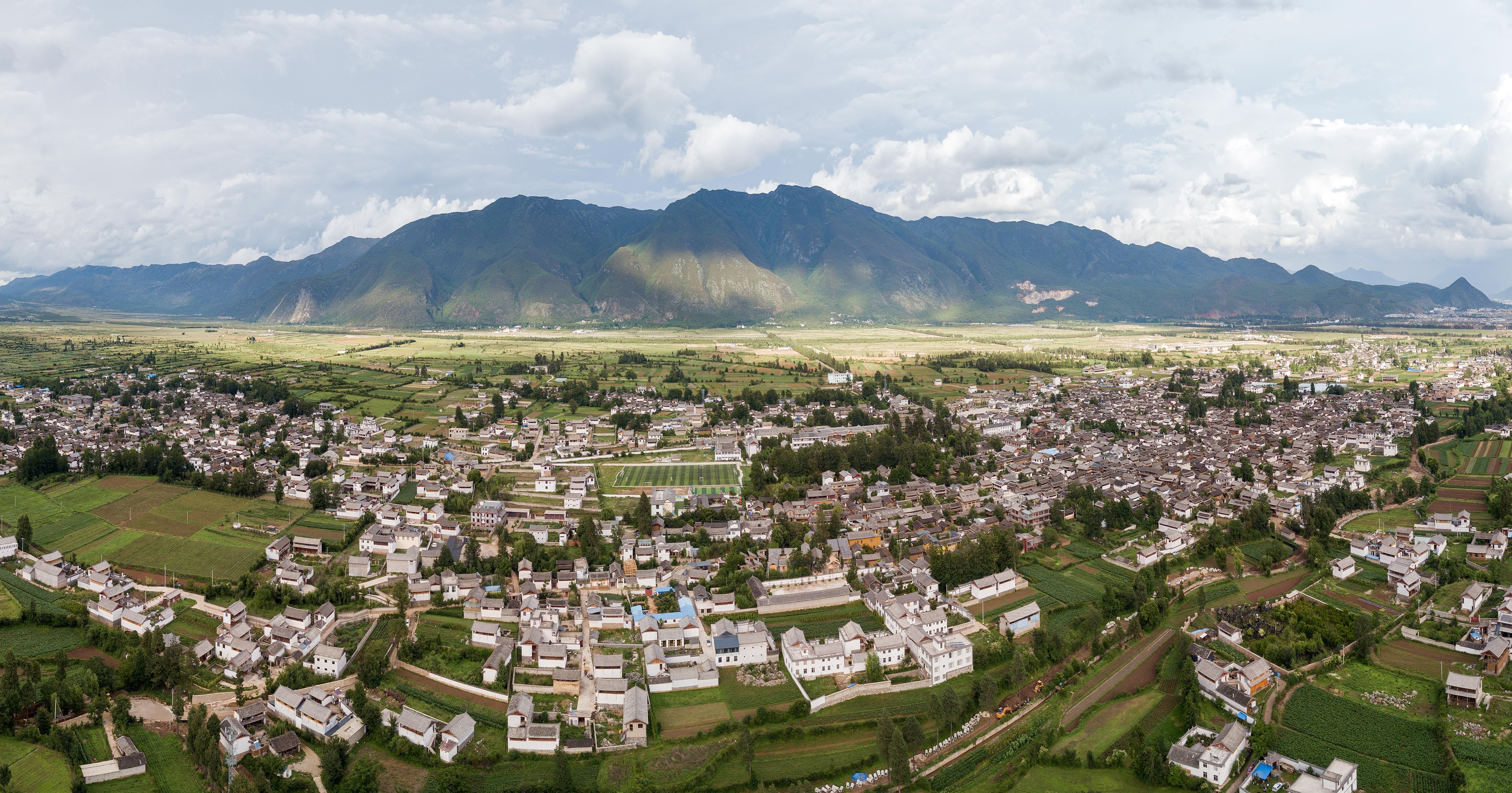

- Location of Yulong County (red) and Lijiang City (pink) within Yunnan

- Location within China Yulong County (China)
- Coordinates: 26°49′12″N 100°14′12″E
- Country: China
- Province: Yunnan
- Prefecture-level city: Lijiang
- County seat: Huangshan Subdistrict

Area
  - Total: 6,521 km^{2} (2,518 sq mi)

Population (2020 census)
  - Total: 224,039
  - Density: 34.36/km^{2} (88.98/sq mi)
- Time zone: UTC+8 (CST)
- Postal code: 674100
- Area code: 0888
- Climate: Cwb
- Website: www.yulong.gov.cn

Yulong Naxi Autonomous County (simplified Chinese: 玉龙纳西族自治县; traditional Chinese: 玉龍納西族自治縣; pinyin: Yùlóng Nàxīzú Zìzhìxiàn; Naxi: Yulleq Naqxiceef Zeeqzheeqxail) is a county located in the northwest of Yunnan Province, China, bordering Sichuan Province to the northeast. It is the westernmost county-level division of the prefecture-level city of Lijiang. Wenhai village and lake along with Jade Dragon Snow Mountain are some of the famous scenic spots found here.

== Geography ==
Yulong County is located in the west of Lijiang in northwestern Yunnan. It borders Gucheng District and Ninglang County to the east, Jianchuan County and Heqing County to the south, Yongsheng County to the southeast, Weixi County and Lanping County to the west, Shangri-La City to the north and Muli County of Sichuan to the northeast.

== Administrative divisions ==
Yulong Naxi Autonomous County has 1 subdistrict, 6 towns, 6 townships and 3 ethnic townships.

1 subdistrict

- Huangshan Subdistrict (黄山街道)

6 towns

- Shigu (石鼓镇)
- Judian (巨甸镇)
- Baisha (白沙镇)
- Lashi (拉市镇)
- Fengke (奉科镇)
- Mingyin (鸣音镇)

6 townships

- Tai'an Township (太安乡)
- Longpan Township (龙蟠乡)
- Ludian Township (鲁甸乡)
- Tacheng Township (塔城乡)
- Daju Township (大具乡)
- Baoshan Township (宝山乡)

3 ethnic townships

- Liming Lisu Ethnic Township (黎明傈僳族乡)
- Shitou Bai Ethnic Township (石头白族乡)
- Jiuhe Bai Ethnic Township (九河白族乡)
