= Lijiang =

Lijiang 丽江市 Likiang
- Prefecture-level city
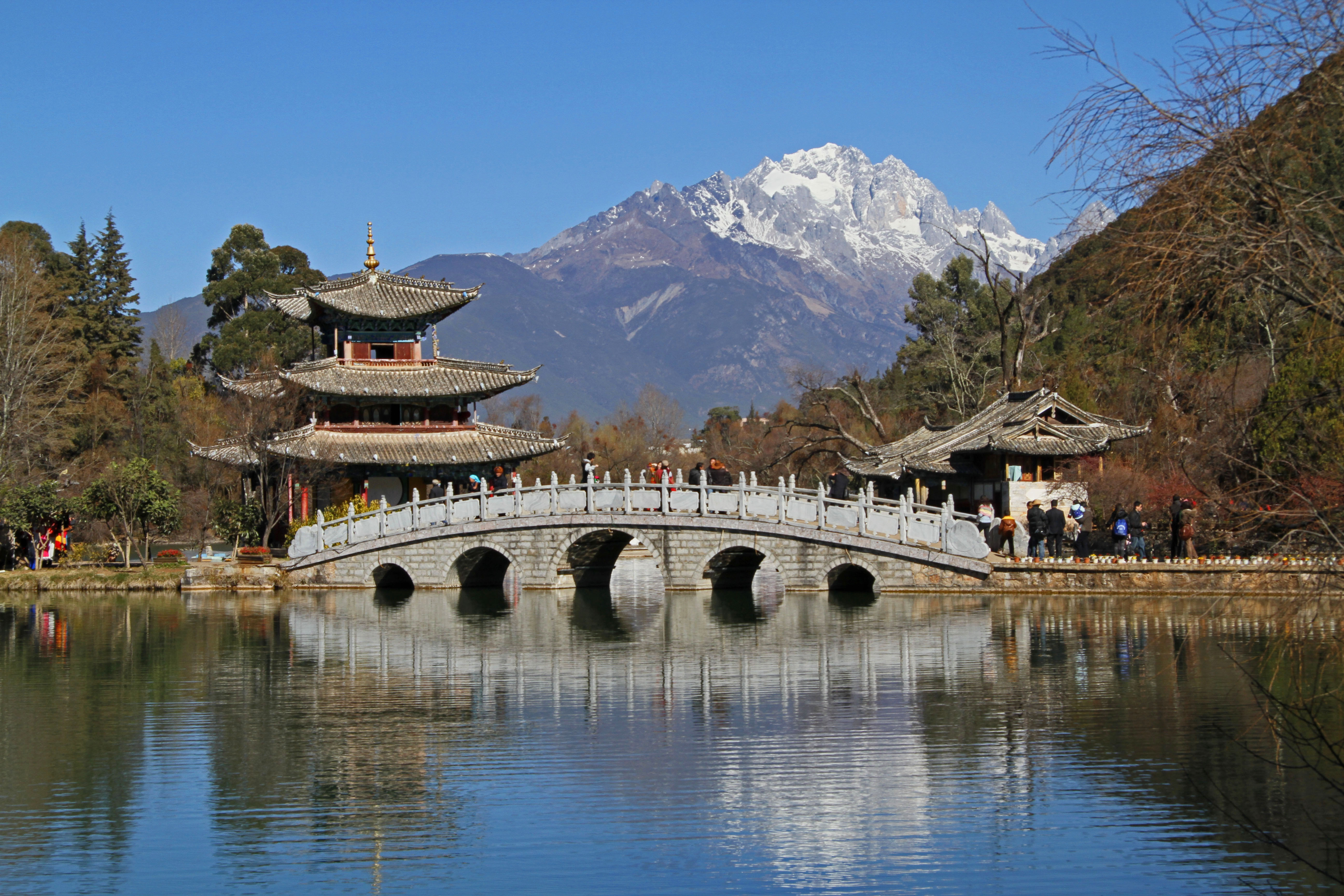
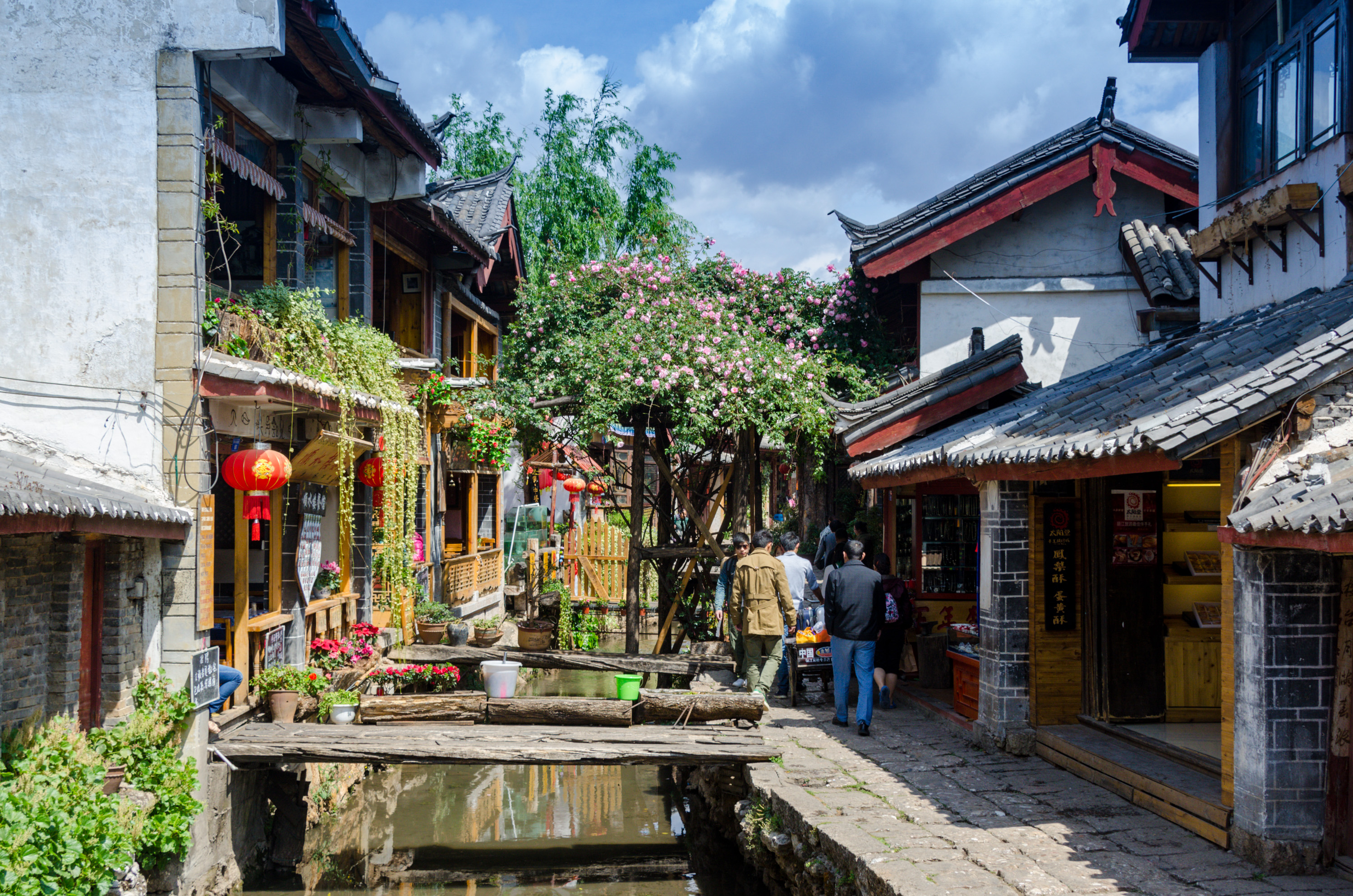
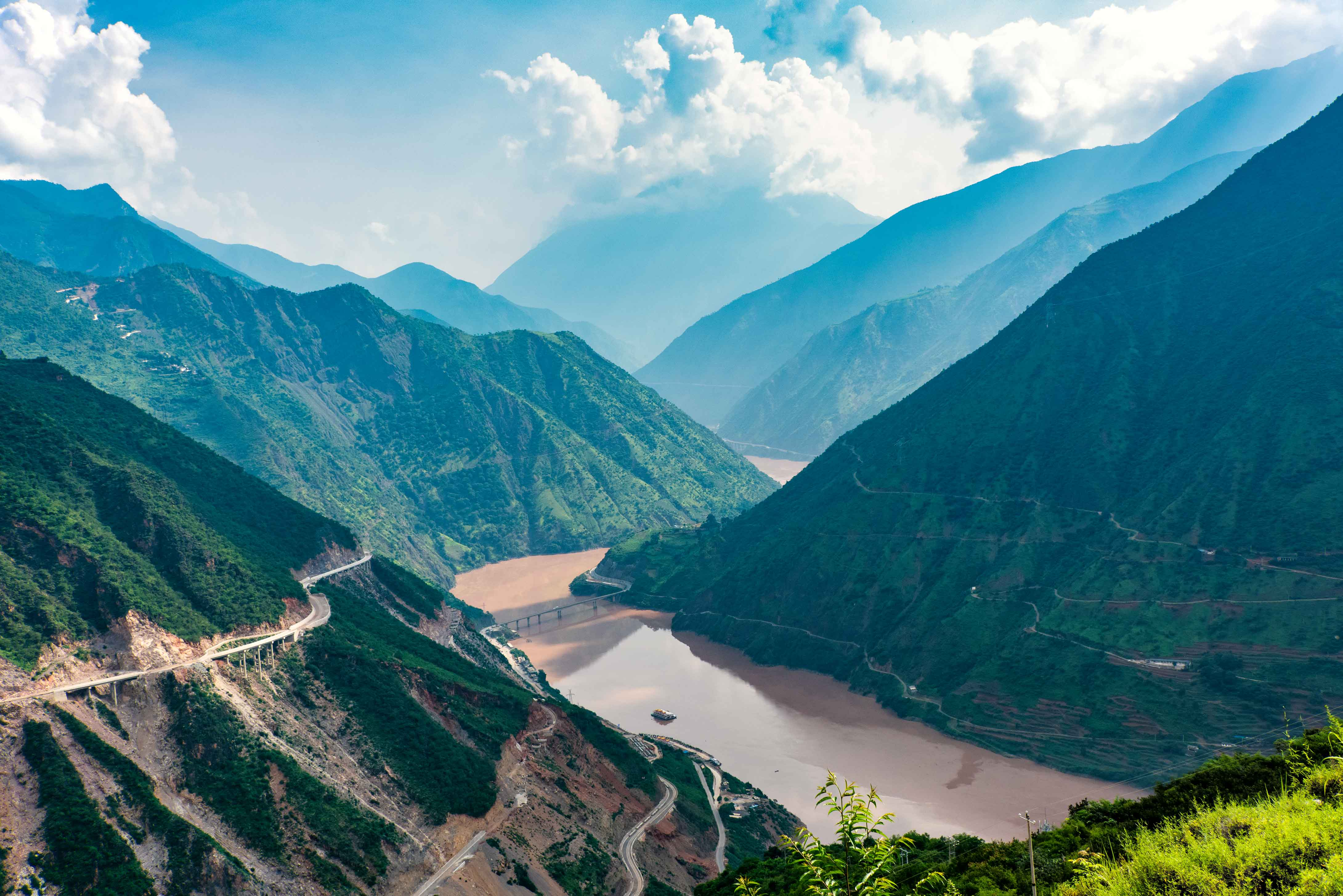
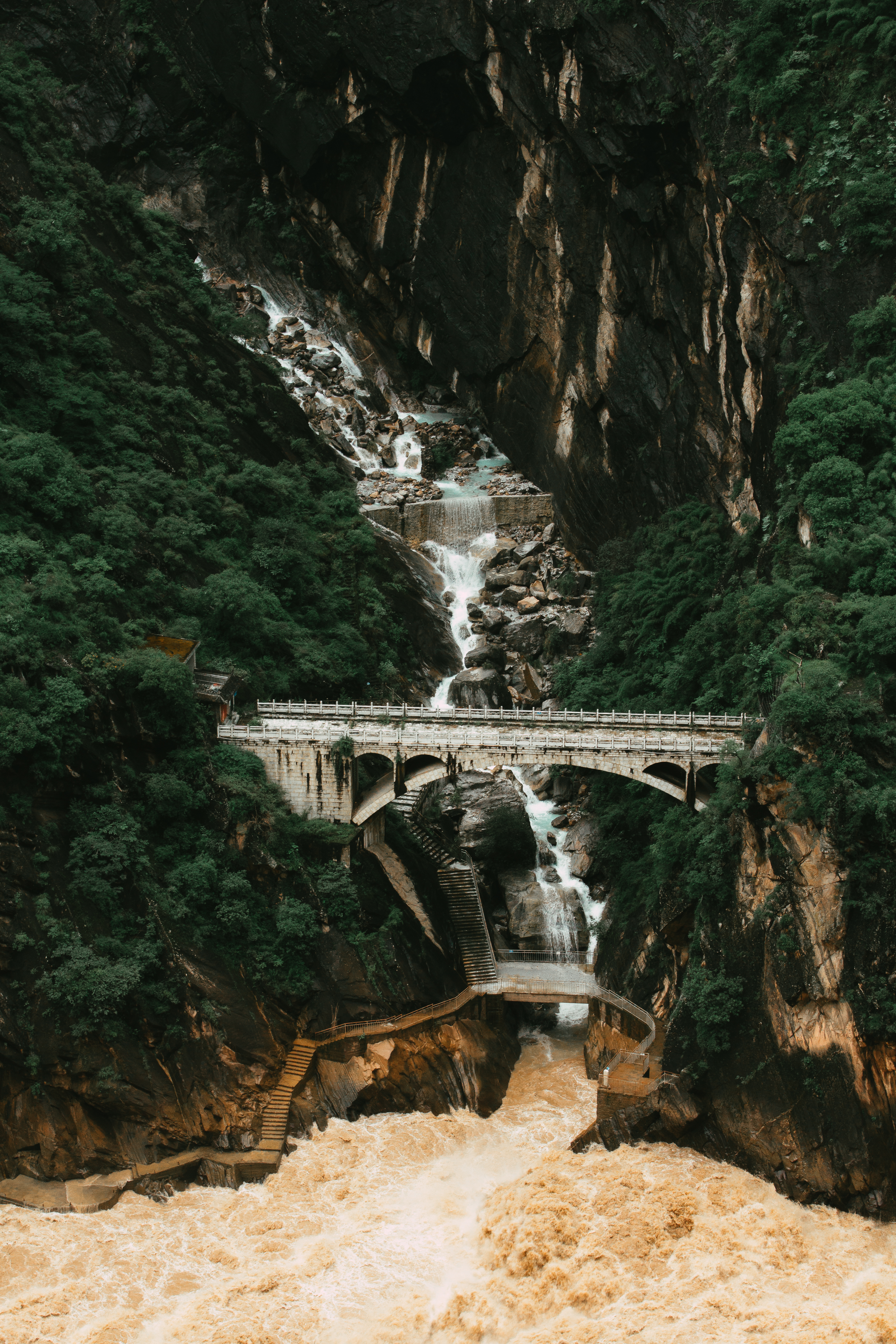
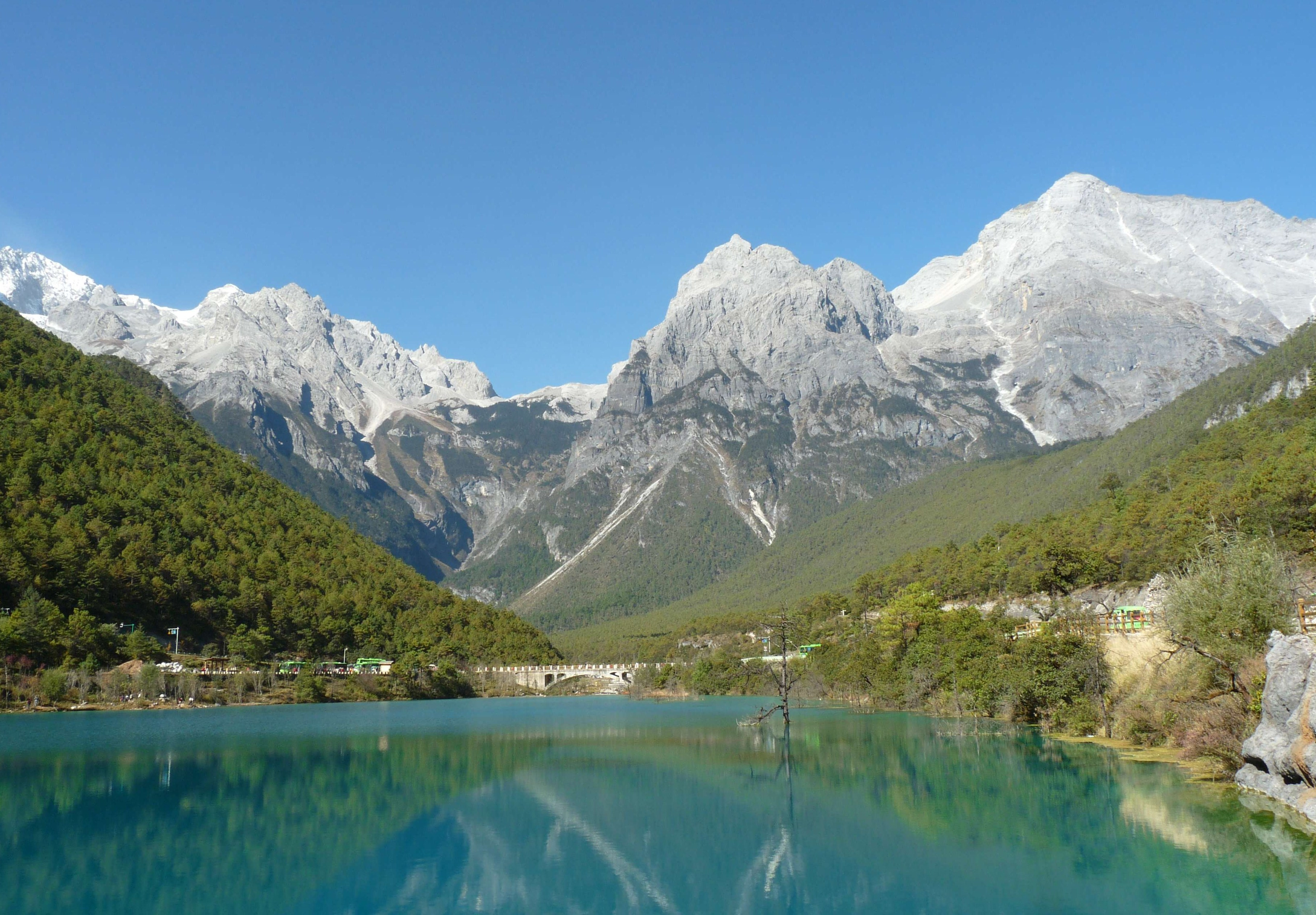
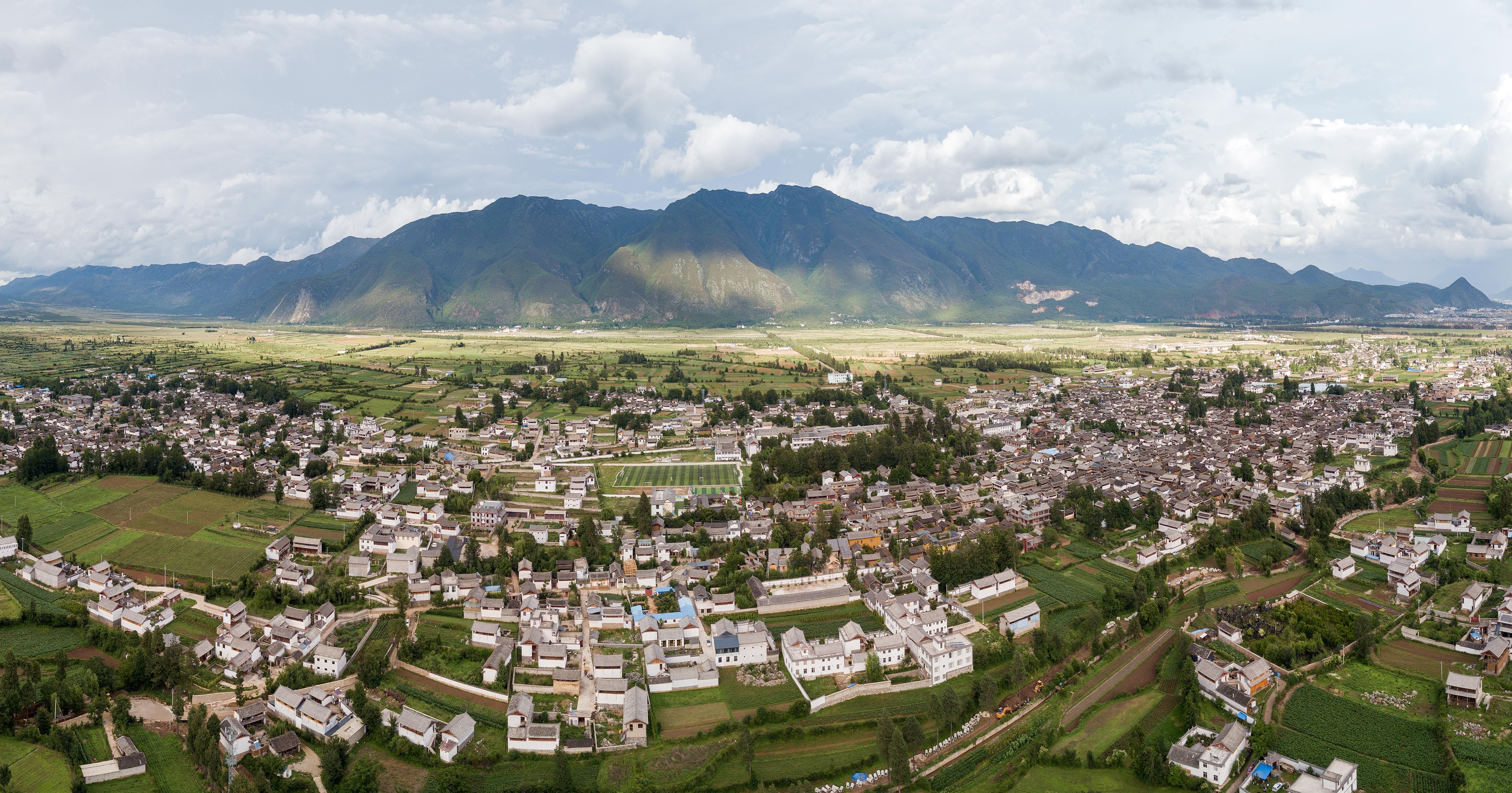
- Black Dragon Pool and Jade Dragon Snow Mountain Old Town of Lijiang Jinsha River Lijiang Old town lookout Tiger Leaping Gorge Baishui River under the Jade Dragon Snow Mountain Baisha Town in Yulong County

- Location of Lijiang City jurisdiction in Yunnan

- Location in China
- Coordinates (Lijiang municipal government): 26°51′19″N 100°13′33″E
- Country: People's Republic of China
- Province: Yunnan
- Admin HQ: Gucheng

Area
  - Prefecture-level city: 20,557 km^{2} (7,937 sq mi)
  - Urban: 1,264 km^{2} (488 sq mi)
  - Metro: 1,264 km^{2} (488 sq mi)
- Elevation: 2,400 m (7,900 ft)

Population (2020 census)
  - Prefecture-level city: 1,253,878
  - Density: 60.995/km^{2} (157.98/sq mi)
  - Urban: 288,787
  - Urban density: 228.5/km^{2} (591.7/sq mi)
  - Metro: 288,787
  - Metro density: 228.5/km^{2} (591.7/sq mi)

GDP
  - Prefecture-level city: CN¥ 62 billion US$ 9.1 billion
  - Per capita: CN¥ 49,768; US$ 7,340
- Time zone: UTC+08:00 (China Standard)
- Postal code: 674100
- Area code: 0888
- ISO 3166 code: CN-YN-07
- Licence plate prefixes: 云P
- Website: lijiang.gov.cn

Lijiang
- "Lijiang" in Simplified (top) and Traditional (bottom) Chinese characters
- Simplified Chinese: 丽江
- Traditional Chinese: 麗江
Transcriptions
Standard Mandarin
- Hanyu Pinyin: Lìjiāng
- Wade–Giles: Li^{4}-chiang^{1}
- IPA: [lîtɕjáŋ]
Yue: Cantonese
- Yale Romanization: Laih-gōng
- Jyutping: Lai6-gong1
Southern Min
- Tâi-lô: Lē-kang

Lijiang (Chinese: 丽江), formerly romanized as Likiang, is a prefecture-level city in the northwest of Yunnan Province, China. It has an area of 21,219 square kilometres (8,193 sq mi) and had a population of 1,253,878 at the 2020 census whom 288,787 lived in the built-up area (metro) made of Gucheng District. By the end of 2024, the registered population of the city was 1,243,700. Lijiang is famous for its UNESCO Heritage Site, the Old Town of Lijiang, which contains a mixture of different historical architecture styles and a complex, ancient water-supply system. It borders Liangshan Yi Autonomous Prefecture and Panzhihua City in Sichuan Province to the east and it has one municipality and four counties.

Lijiang City is located on the Yungui Plateau, abutting the Qinghai-Tibet Plateau. It is one of the key forest areas in Yunnan Province, and one of the west–east power transmission bases of China's hydropower industry. Lijiang City is a multi-ethnic settlement: apart from the Han nationality, there are a total of 22 ethnic minorities.

Lijiang is the only prefecture-level city with three World Heritage Sites. It is rich in tourism resources, with 104 widely recognised tourist attractions, including the Old Town of Lijiang, Yulong Snow Mountain, Tiger Leaping Gorge, and Laojun Mountain.

== History ==
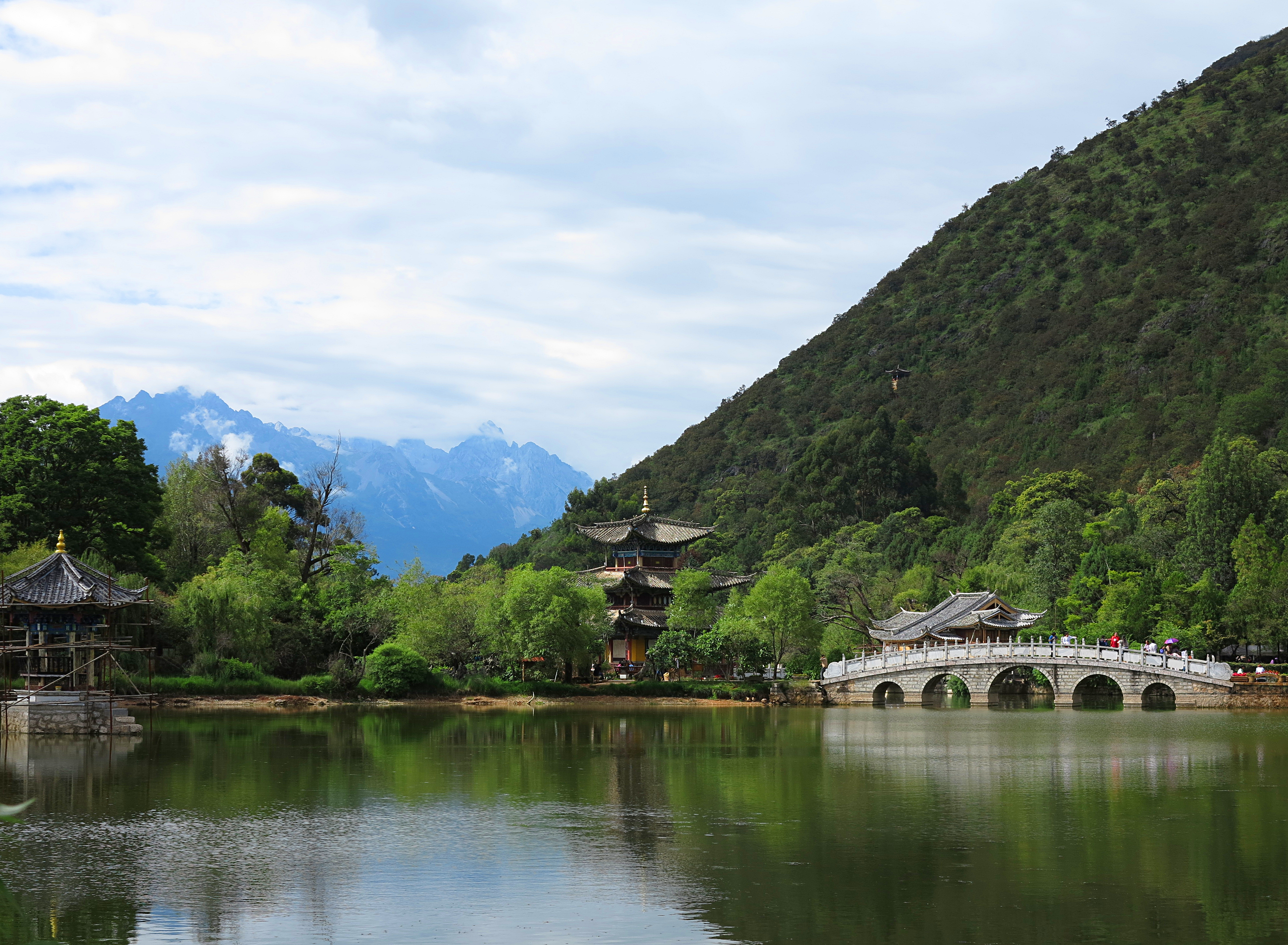
Qing dynasty buildings around the Black Dragon Pool with the Jade Dragon Snow Mountain in the background.

As far back as 100,000 years ago, people of the late Paleolithic were active in what is now Lijiang. The discovery of cave paintings in the Jinsha River Valley along with numerous Neolithic stone tools and later artifacts of Bronze and Iron Age provenance reveal Lijiang to have been one of the most important centres of ancient human activity in southwest China.

During the Warring States period, today's Lijiang was part of the Shu Prefecture of the Qin state. At the end of the Warring States period, it was incorporated into the Dian Kingdom. The Dian Kingdom submitted to the Han dynasty, and today's Lijiang City belonged to the Yuezhi Commandery, known as Suijiu County. By the time of the Three Kingdoms, it was part of Yunnan Prefecture. During the Northern and Southern Dynasties period, the Naxi people migrated to the area. During the time of the Tang dynasty it was incorporated into the Tibetan Empire, and subsequently the Nanzhao kingdom, coming under the jurisdiction of the Jianchuan Jiedushi (military commission).

The Baisha Old Town was the political, commercial and cultural center for the local Naxi people and other ethnic groups for 450 years from the year 658 AD to 1107AD. The Dabaoji Palace of the Baisha Fresco, very close to the Baisha Naxi Hand-made Embroidery Institute, was built in the year 658 AD in the Tang dynasty (618 AD to 907 AD).

In ancient times, the Baisha Old Town used to be the center of silk embroidery in the southwest of China and the most important place of the Ancient Southern Silk Road, also called the Ancient Tea and Horse Road or Ancient tea route. The Ancient Southern Silk Road started from Burma, crossed Lijiang, Shangri-La County, Tibet, continued through Iran, the Fertile Crescent before finally reaching the Mediterranean.

Lijiang submitted to Khubilai Khan as he led his troops against the Dali kingdom in 1253. Though the kingdom was incorporated into the Mongol empire, then the Yuan dynasty, it was given the status of tusi, or indigenous office, which gave autonomy to the local Naxi rulers. During the Ming dynasty, the Naxi were one of the few border peoples to support the Ming immediately. As the Naxi helped the Ming expand in Southwest China the ruler family was given the title of Mu. During this period the Kingdom of Lijiang was able to expand into Sichuan and Tibet bringing many Tibetan peoples into its territory as well as their cultural and religious influence. It was under the rule of the Naxi ruling house of the Mu family (木氏) during the Yuan (not yet named Mu), Ming, and Qing dynasties. The Mu "held this position until 1723, when Lijiang became directly incorporated under the authority of the Qing central government."

In the 15th year of the Ming dynasty's Hongwu Emperor's reign (1382), A Jia A De, the local chief of Lijiang, "led the people to submit", and the Lijiang Lu XuanfuSi (Lijiang Road's pacification commissioner's office) was restructured into the Lijiang Prefecture. By the 30th year of the Hongwu Emperor (1397), it was promoted to the Lijiang Junmin Fu (Lijiang Military and Civil Administration), which governed over four states, one county, and one patrol inspection office: Tong'an State, Baoshan State, Ju Jin State, Lin Xi county, and Shimen pass patrol Inspection office.

In the 17th year of the Qing dynasty's Shunzhi Emperor's reign(1660), the Lijiang JunminFu was established again, with the Mu family continuing to hold the hereditary position of the chief. In the first year of the Yongzheng Emperor's reign(1723), the implemented the "reform of the native chieftain system" in Lijiang, replacing the hereditary chief with an appointed official from the court, and demoting the Mu family to the position of the Qianlong Emperor's reign(1770), Lijiang County was established.

In the second year of the Republic of China (1912), the Lijiang Prefecture was abolished, retaining only the county, and the county government moved into the former Lijiang Prefecture's office building.

In the 20th year of the Republic of China (1931), three counties were established within the current area of Lijiang: Lijiang, Yongbei, and Huaping.

In 2002 Lijiang City was established, replacing the former Lijiang Naxi Autonomous County.

== Geography ==
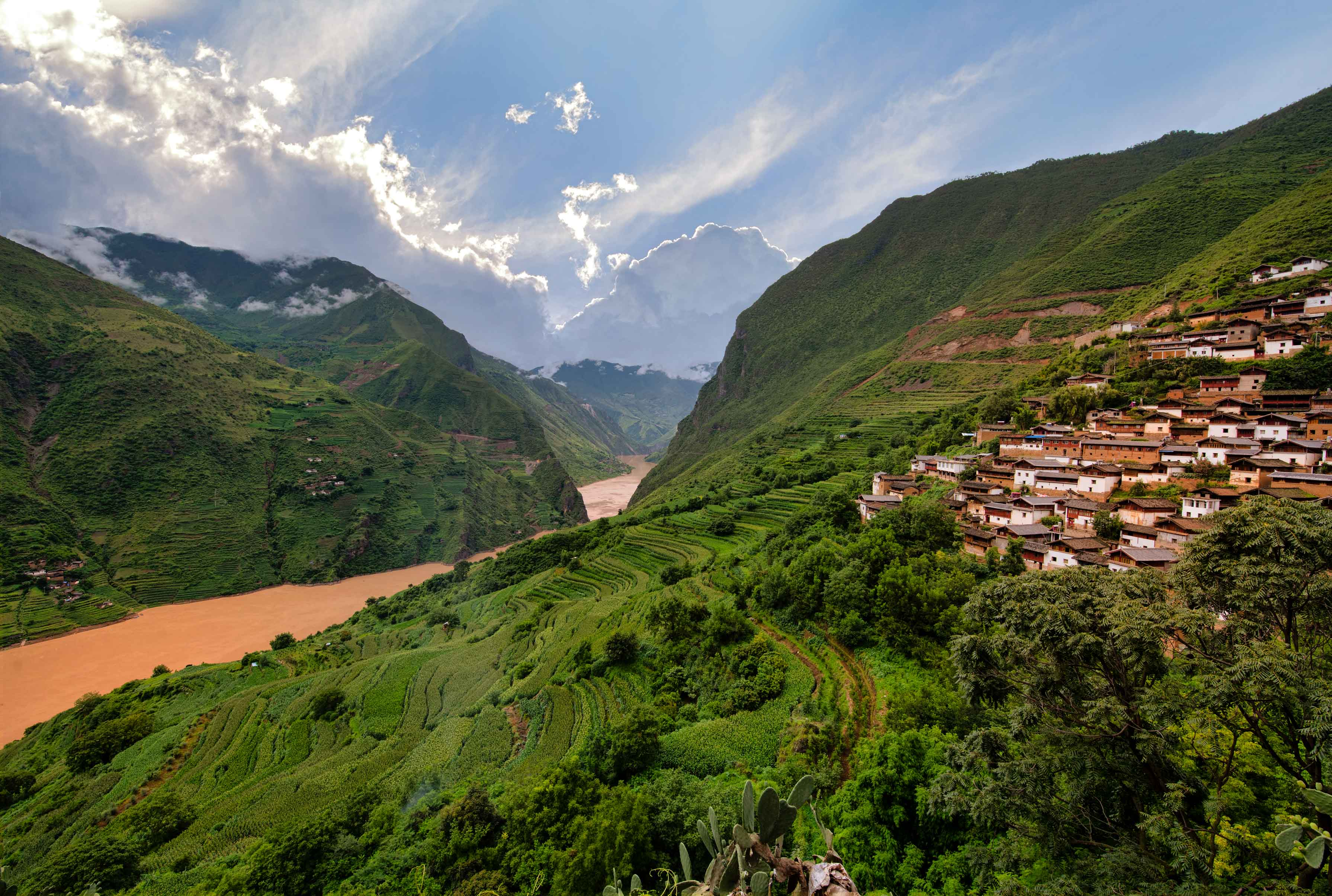
Baoshan, a village in Yulong County

Lijiang is located in the northwestern portion of Yunnan and borders Sichuan. It is within the region encompassed by the Hengduan Mountains, where the Qinghai-Tibet Plateau and Yunnan–Guizhou Plateau converge. It borders Sichuan Liangshan Yi Autonomous Prefecture and Panzhihua City to the east, and Jianchuan, Heqing and Binchuan three of the Dali Bai Autonomous Prefecture in the south. County and Chuxiong Yi Autonomous Prefecture Dayao and Yongren counties, west and north are adjacent to Lanping County of Nujiang Yi Autonomous Prefecture and Weixi County of Diqing Tibetan Autonomous Prefecture. The city has a total area of 20,600 square kilometers and governs the ancient city, Yulong Naxi Autonomous County, Yongsheng County, Huaping County and Ninglang Yi Autonomous County.

Lijiang City has a terrain that is higher in the northwest and lower in the southeast. The highest point is the main peak of Yulong Snow Mountain, with an elevation of 5,596 meters, and the lowest point is at the mouth of the Tangba River in Shilongba Township, Huaping County, with an elevation of 1,015 meters, resulting in a maximum elevation difference of 4,581 meters. To the west of Yulong Mountain lies the high mountain and gorge sub-region of the Hengduan Mountain Range, characterized by high mountains and deep valleys, with steep and towering mountain ranges and rivers cutting deeply through them. To the east of Yulong Mountain is part of the Dianxi Basin's mountainous plateau region, specifically the northwestern sub-region of the Dian Plateau, which has a higher elevation and more robust mountainous terrain. On both sides of the main mountain range, there are also extensive east–west oriented valleys, creating a complex and intricate landscape of landforms with undulating terrain and a significant difference in elevation. There are 111 large and small basins scattered among the mountain ranges, generally at an elevation of over 2,000 meters, with the Lijiang Basin being the largest, covering an area of about 200 square kilometers and an average elevation of 2,466 meters.

The Jinsha River, which flows through Lijiang City, along with the three major mountain ranges that rise abruptly on both sides—the Yunling Mountains' Laojun Mountain, Yulong Mountain, and Mianmian Mountain (commonly known as Xiao Liangshan), form the basic framework and backbone of the topography of Lijiang City. Laojun Mountain stretches like a barrier from north to south on the west side, with its main peak reaching an elevation of 4,247.4 meters. Yulong Snow Mountain, which is located 15 kilometers from the seat of the city government of Lijiang, features high mountain glacier landforms and is covered with snow all year round. Its 13 peaks are connected end to end, pointing towards the sky. To the east lies Mianmian Mountain. There are 12 high mountains in Lijiang City with an elevation ranging from 3,500 to 5,000 meters. Middle mountains with an elevation between 2,500 and 3,500 meters are distributed across all counties. The areas of Ninglang and Yongsheng have a particularly high number of these mountains, and low mountainous areas below 2,500 meters are widely distributed in the southeastern and southern parts of the city.

== Climate ==
Owing to its low latitude and high elevation, the city centre of Lijiang experiences a mild subtropical highland climate (Köppen Cwb). Winters are mild, very dry and sunny (>70% possible sunshine), although average lows in December and January are just above the freezing mark; January is the coolest month, with an average temperature of 6.7 °C (44.1 °F). Spring begins early and remains dry and sunny until late May, when there is a dramatic uptick in frequency and amount of rainfall that lasts until late September. Summers are warm, rainy and damp, with June, the warmest month, averaging 19.1 °C (66.4 °F). Autumn sees an abrupt reduction in rainfall and return to sunniness. The annual mean temperature is 13.3 °C (55.9 °F), while precipitation averages 968 mm (38.1 in), around 80% of which occurs from June to September. With monthly percent possible sunshine ranging from 29% in July to 80% in December, the city receives 2,412 hours of sunshine annually.

Climate data for Lijiang, elevation 2,381 m (7,812 ft), (1991–2020 normals, extremes 1951–present)
Month	Jan	Feb	Mar	Apr	May	Jun	Jul	Aug	Sep	Oct	Nov	Dec	Year
Record high °C (°F)	23.3 (73.9)	24.3 (75.7)	27.8 (82.0)	28.9 (84.0)	32.8 (91.0)	32.3 (90.1)	31.4 (88.5)	29.8 (85.6)	28.7 (83.7)	26.4 (79.5)	24.7 (76.5)	22.8 (73.0)	32.8 (91.0)
Mean daily maximum °C (°F)	14.1 (57.4)	15.7 (60.3)	18.0 (64.4)	20.8 (69.4)	23.1 (73.6)	24.5 (76.1)	23.4 (74.1)	23.1 (73.6)	21.8 (71.2)	20.4 (68.7)	17.4 (63.3)	14.9 (58.8)	19.8 (67.6)
Daily mean °C (°F)	6.7 (44.1)	8.7 (47.7)	11.2 (52.2)	14.2 (57.6)	17.0 (62.6)	19.1 (66.4)	18.4 (65.1)	17.8 (64.0)	16.3 (61.3)	13.7 (56.7)	9.8 (49.6)	7.0 (44.6)	13.3 (56.0)
Mean daily minimum °C (°F)	0.6 (33.1)	3.1 (37.6)	5.9 (42.6)	9.0 (48.2)	12.0 (53.6)	14.9 (58.8)	15.0 (59.0)	14.3 (57.7)	12.8 (55.0)	9.0 (48.2)	3.8 (38.8)	0.5 (32.9)	8.4 (47.1)
Record low °C (°F)	−7.1 (19.2)	−6.2 (20.8)	−4.2 (24.4)	−1.3 (29.7)	3.0 (37.4)	6.2 (43.2)	6.9 (44.4)	6.6 (43.9)	3.4 (38.1)	−0.7 (30.7)	−4.5 (23.9)	−10.3 (13.5)	−10.3 (13.5)
Average precipitation mm (inches)	5.0 (0.20)	5.4 (0.21)	12.9 (0.51)	19.9 (0.78)	68.8 (2.71)	146.8 (5.78)	253.4 (9.98)	228.7 (9.00)	157.1 (6.19)	56.5 (2.22)	11.6 (0.46)	2.0 (0.08)	968.1 (38.12)
Average precipitation days (≥ 0.1 mm)	2.3	3.5	5.0	7.0	12.3	18.3	23.6	22.5	19.8	10.7	3.2	1.1	129.3
Average snowy days	1.8	0.9	0.4	0.1	0	0	0	0	0	0.1	0.3	0.3	3.9
Average relative humidity (%)	44	43	45	49	58	70	80	82	82	72	60	51	61
Mean monthly sunshine hours	256.7	233.3	246.0	235.1	212.8	159.9	119.6	134.8	125.5	192.4	236.3	259.3	2,411.7
Percentage possible sunshine	78	73	66	61	51	39	29	34	34	55	74	80	56
Source 1: China Meteorological Administration All-time October highall-time November record highextremes
Source 2: Weather China

== Hydrological ==
The rivers within Lijiang city are divided into two major river basins and three water systems, namely the Jinsha River system and the Yalong River system of the Yangtze River basin, and the Lancang River system of the Lancang-Mekong River basin. Among them, the Yangtze River basin covers an area of 20,799 square kilometers, accounting for 98% of the total area; the Lancang River basin covers an area of 420 square kilometers, accounting for 2% of the total area. There are a total of 93 second-order and above tributaries of the Jinsha River, Yalong River, and Lancang River within Lijiang city, of which there are 21 rivers with a basin area of more than 200 square kilometers.

In addition to Lugu Lake, there are two larger natural lakes in Lijiang city, Chenghai and Lashihai. Among them, Chenghai is located in Yongsheng County and is one of the three lakes in the world that are rich in natural spirulina. It is also the only lake in China where spirulina can grow naturally. It covers an area of 77.2 square kilometers, with a water storage capacity of 1.987 billion cubic meters, an average water depth of 25.74 meters, and is the fourth largest lake in Yunnan Province.

Lashihai is located in Lashi Town, Yulong County, 8 kilometers away from the urban area of Lijiang. The lake area is oval-shaped with an altitude of 2450 meters, a water depth of 2.5 to 4.5 meters, a water storage area of 241 square kilometers, and a lake surface area of 8.5 square kilometers. In 1998, it became the first highland wetland nature reserve and a migratory bird habitat in Yunnan Province, and in 2005, it was included in the list of Internationally Important Wetlands.

== Natural resources ==
=== Land resources ===
By the end of 2022, Lijiang City had a total of 185,745.95 hectares (2,786,189 mu) of arable land. This includes:Paddy fields amounting to 29,283.03 hectares (439,245 mu), accounting for 15.77% of the total. Irrigated land amounting to 5,857.66 hectares (88,765 mu), accounting for 3.15% of the total. Dry land amounting to 150,605.26 hectares (2,259,079 mu), accounting for 81.08% of the total.

Yongsheng County and Ninglang Yi Autonomous County have relatively larger areas of arable land, making up 64.28% of the total arable land in Lijiang City. All the arable land is located in regions with a double cropping system per year and in areas with an annual precipitation of 800-1200 millimeters (inclusive of 800 millimeters).

=== Biological resources ===
Lijiang City is home to a rich diversity of flora and fauna, with more than 13,000 species of animals and plants, making it one of the country's renowned bases for the protection of these species. It is also one of the key forested areas in Yunnan Province and has been identified by the International Union for Conservation of Nature (IUCN) as one of the 25 global biodiversity hotspots in the Hengduan Mountains region of China. Within its borders, there are several national first-class protected wild animals, such as the Yunnan golden snub-nosed monkey, clouded leopard, and forest musk deer, as well as rare species of national first-class protected wild plants, including the Himalayan yew, high-altitude water plantain, and Yulong fern. The forest coverage rate in Lijiang City is 72.14%, which makes it one of the key areas for the protection of natural forests in the country.

Lijiang City has recorded a variety of animal species, including: Mammals: 112 species across 8 orders, 21 families. Birds: 446 species across 17 orders, 46 families. Amphibians and reptiles: 51 species across 3 orders, 14 families, and 35 genera. Fish: Over 70 species across 5 orders, 15 families. In terms of vascular plants, there are 4,163 species (subspecies), belonging to 224 families and 1,120 genera. The number of seed plants is over 3,200 species across 145 families and 758 genera, with more than 2,000 species of medicinal materials. There are 2,266 species that are endemic to China and 617 species endemic to Yunnan Province.

Yulong Snow Mountain within the city's boundaries is a world-renowned site for plant specimen typification. There are also over a hundred new species and varieties of plants named after Lijiang's landscapes and place names on the international stage. As a result, Lijiang City has been dubbed the "Kingdom of Alpine Plants" and the "Hometown of Medicinal Herbs."

== Administrative divisions ==
The government of Lijiang City sits in Gucheng District.

Lijiang City comprises one district and four counties:

Map
#	Name	Hanzi	Hanyu Pinyin	Population (2010)	Area (km^{2})	Density (/km^{2})
1	Gucheng District	古城区	Gǔchéng Qū	211,151	1,127	187
2	Yongsheng County	永胜县	Yǒngshèng Xiàn	392,024	5,099	77
3	Huaping County	华坪县	Huápíng Xiàn	168,028	2,266	74
4	Yulong Nakhi Autonomous County	玉龙纳西族自治县	Yùlóng Nàxīzú Zìzhìxiàn	214,697	6,521	33
5	Ninglang Yi Autonomous County	宁蒗彝族自治县	Nínglàng Yízú Zìzhìxiàn	258,869	6,206	42

== Demography ==
Lijiang is a multi-ethnic settlement. The Naxi, originally from northwestern China and having a Tibeto-Burman language with pictographic characters of their own, are mainly distributed in Lijiang, with a population of about 230,000 (including Mosuo, which is different from most Naxi people; they belong to a matrilineal clan, and the locals call it walking marriage). There are also Yi, Lisu, Hua Lisu and other nationalities. Lijiang has the only Naxi autonomous county in China.

The residents in the county are mainly Naxi, and there are also Bai, Yi, Lisu, Pumi and other minorities. Among them, the Dongba of the Naxi nationality is known as the only "living pictograph" in the world that has been preserved intact. Among the resident population in 2010, the Han population was 537,893, accounting for 43.21% of the total population; the ethnic minorities population was 706,876, accounting for 56.79% of the total population.

Ethnic Composition of Lijiang City (November 2010)
National name	Han	Yi	Naxi	Lisu	Bai	Pumi	Dai	Miao	Tibetan	Hui	Others	Total
Population	537893	243400	240580	115730	52071	20400	11236	6884	5199	4615	6761	1244769
Proportion of total population (%)	43.21	19.55	19.33	9.30	4.18	1.64	0.90	0.55	0.42	0.37	0.54	100
Proportion of minority population (%)	---	34.43	34.03	16.37	7.37	2.89	1.59	0.97	0.74	0.65	0.96	---

== Cuisine ==
Local dishes include salad of Chicken pea jelly (鸡豆凉粉), a dish made from legumes ground into a flour that is formed into noodles or jelly. This is sauced and served cold or after being stir-fried. Another is Naxi Roast Pork, 纳西烧烤, a version of pork belly cooked so the skin is crispy. A cured rib hot pot is also eaten, and is sold by several vendors in the Xiangshan Market. The salmon in Lijiang is not the seafood salmon we are familiar with, but rather salmon nourished by snowmelt. The snowmelt from Jade Dragon Snow Mountain is the freshwater suitable for salmon to grow.

The delicious flavor of black goat hot pot is often found throughout the streets and alleys of Lijiang. People who have visited Lijiang always praise the black goat. Lijiang Baba: Lijiang Baba is golden in color, has a fragrant aroma, is crispy and delicious, and does not easily spoil or change flavor.

== Transportation ==
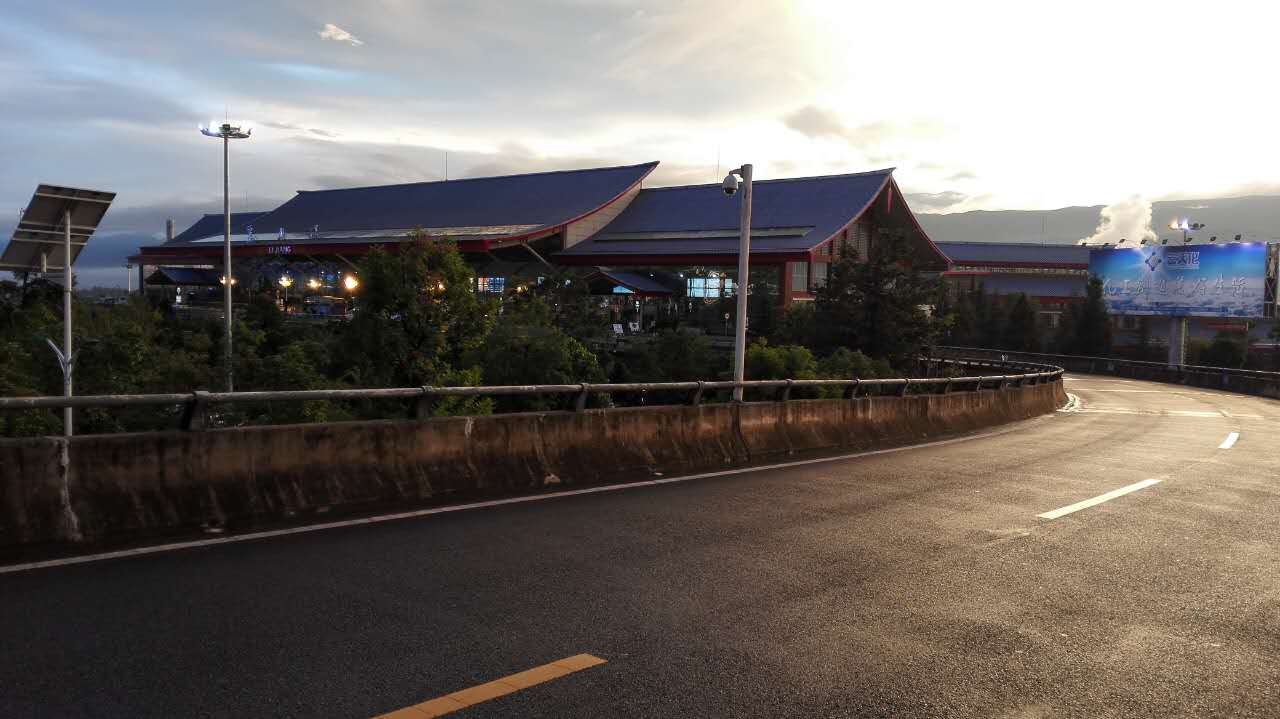
Lijiang Sanyi Airport

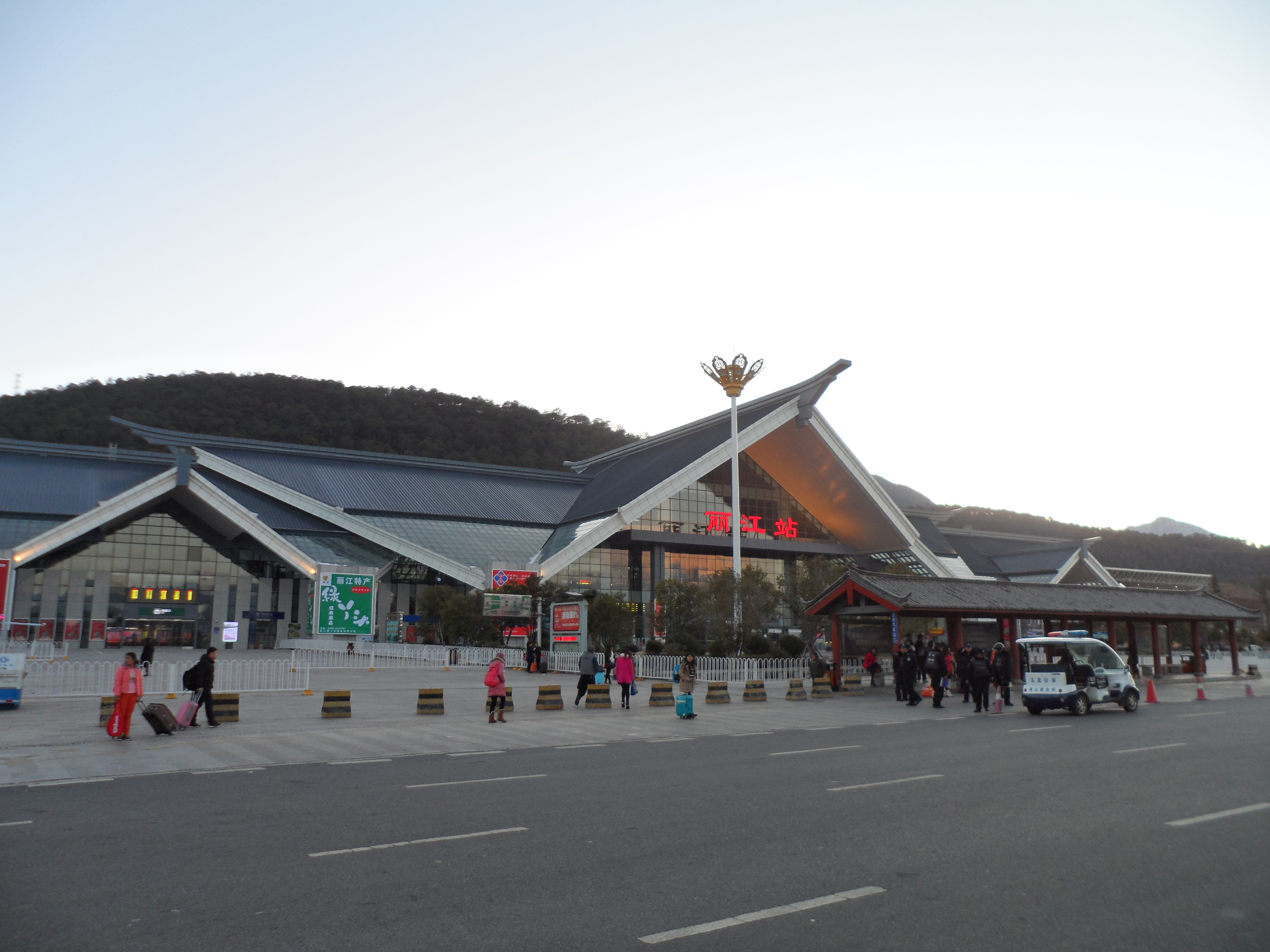
Lijiang railway station

=== Airport ===
- Lijiang Sanyi International Airport (LJG): Lijiang Airport is located in the south of Lijiang city, 28 km (17 mi) away from downtown. There is an airport shuttle bus service in downtown Lijiang. The airport was opened in July 1995 and has flights to Kunming, Chengdu, Xishuangbanna, Beijing, Shanghai, Guangzhou, Wuhan, Shenzhen, Xiamen via Chongqing and Guiyang. It also offers chartered airplane service. There are flights from Kunming to Lijiang every day and is about 30 minutes flight time.

=== Road ===
- G5611 Dali–Lijiang Expressway
- There are bus services to, amongst others, Kunming (8 hrs), Dali (3 hrs), the Tiger Leaping Gorge and Shangri-La.
- Lijiang has several bridges over the Jinsha River, including the Jinlong Bridge, built in 1936, the oldest over the Yangtze.

=== Railway ===
Lijiang railway station is currently the terminus of the Dali–Lijiang railway, which heads south. The Lijiang–Shangri-La railway, currently under construction, will extend this line north to Shangri-La.

- There is a train service to Kunming with one overnight and two day trains, and one day train to Dali.
- As of early 2019, a high speed train linking Lijiang to Kunming was introduced. Three pairs of high speed trains are operated between Lijiang railway station and Kunming railway station / Kunming South railway station. It takes around 3–3.5 hours and the ticket fare is CNY 197–220 for a second class seat.
- There are over 5 pairs of conventional speed trains running between Lijiang and Kunming. The distance is about 517 km (321 mi), requiring 8.5 – 9.5 hours for a one-way trip. A hard sleeper costs CNY 186.5.
- The Lijiang–Shangri-La railway from Lijiang to Shangri-La was opened in November 2023.

=== Tram ===
- Line 1 of Lijiang Tram started construction in October 2019.

== Sites ==
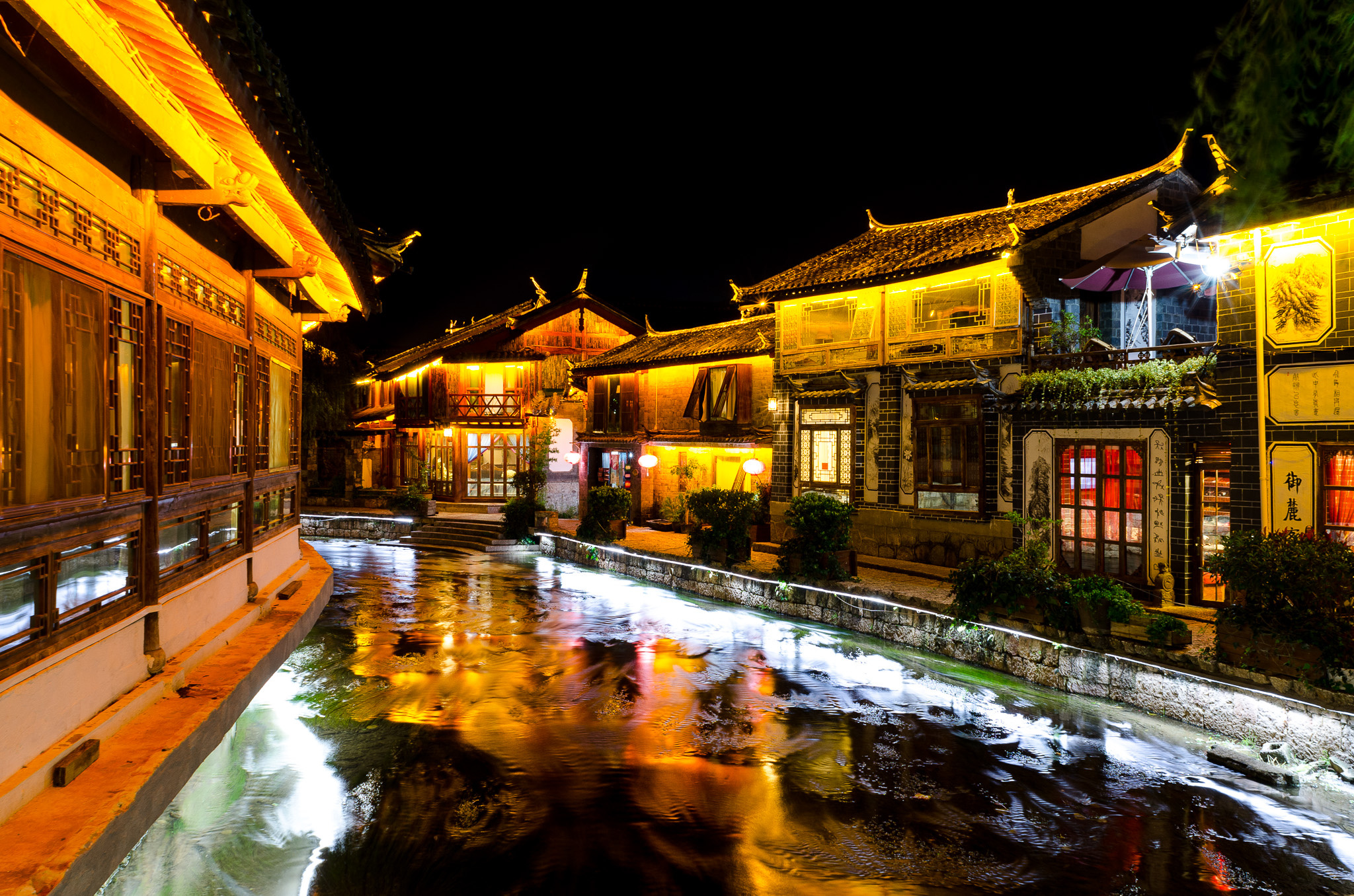
Old Town by night

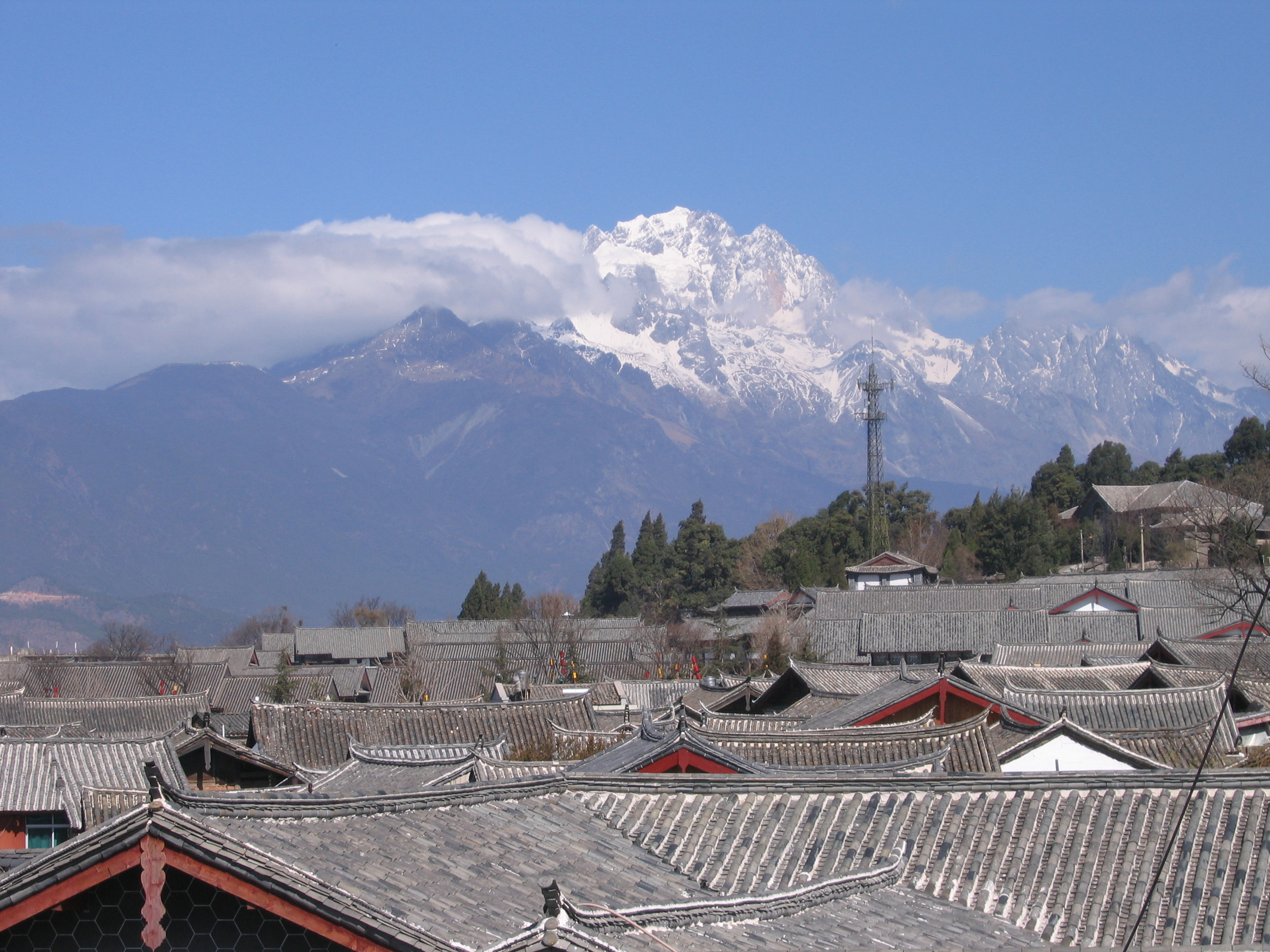
Jade Dragon Snow Mountain towering above roofs of the old town

Major geographical features in the area include Old Town of Lijiang, Lugu Lake, Jade Dragon Snow Mountain and Laojun Mountain.

== Nearby ==
Some 35 kilometers north of Lijiang is the Baishui Terrace, an area where spring water flows over a sinter terrace, leaving behind travertine.

Fifteen kilometers north of Lijiang is the village of Baisha, famous for the Baisha Fresco and the Naxi Hand-made Embroidery Institute. The Fresco was built in the Ming dynasty 600 years ago, the Naxi Hand-made Embroidery Institute was built 800 years ago, it is the headquarters of the Naxi embroideries and also, a school for the Naxi embroiderers. There are many Naxi embroidery masters, teachers, students and local farmers there. Their embroidery arts can be found there.

== Education ==
Lijiang Teachers College (丽江师范高等专科学校; Lìjiāng Shīfàn Gāoděng Zhuānkēxuéxiào) and Lijiang Culture and Tourism College (丽江文化旅游学院; Lìjiāng Wénhuà Lǚyóu Xuéyuàn) are located in Lijiang. The latter was a branch of Yunnan University (YNU). At one point the teacher's college merged into YNU.

== Sister cities ==
- Kazan, Tatarstan, Russia
- Roanoke, Virginia, United States
- New Westminster, British Columbia, Canada
- Takayama, Gifu, Japan
- Shepparton, Victoria, Australia
- Whanganui, New Zealand
- Preah Vihear Province, Cambodia

== See also ==
- Riding Alone for Thousands of Miles: a film by Zhang Yimou which takes place in the Lijiang area
- Resort town
