= Music of Yunnan =

The music of Yunnan, a province in southwestern China, includes the traditional music of many ethnic groups, including the Miao, Hani and Nakhi (Naxi), the last being the most numerous in the area.

There are 24 folk music items of Yunnan that are protected through the United Nations intangible cultural heritage (ICH) list.

The lusheng is a type of mouth organ used by the Miao of Guizhou for pentatonic antiphonal courtship songs. The Hani of Honghe are known for a unique kind of choral, micro-tonal rice-transplanting songs.

== Nakhi music ==
The Nakhi of Lijiang play a type of song and dance suite called baisha xiyue, which was supposedly brought by Kublai Khan in AD 1253. Nakhi dongjing is an ancient type of music related to southern Chinese forms, and is popular today. Both these styles are quite old, which has led Nakhi music to be called a "living fossil" of Chinese music. In addition to donjing and baisha xiyue, a style called huangjing yinyue also has an ancient history in the area, but is no longer known.

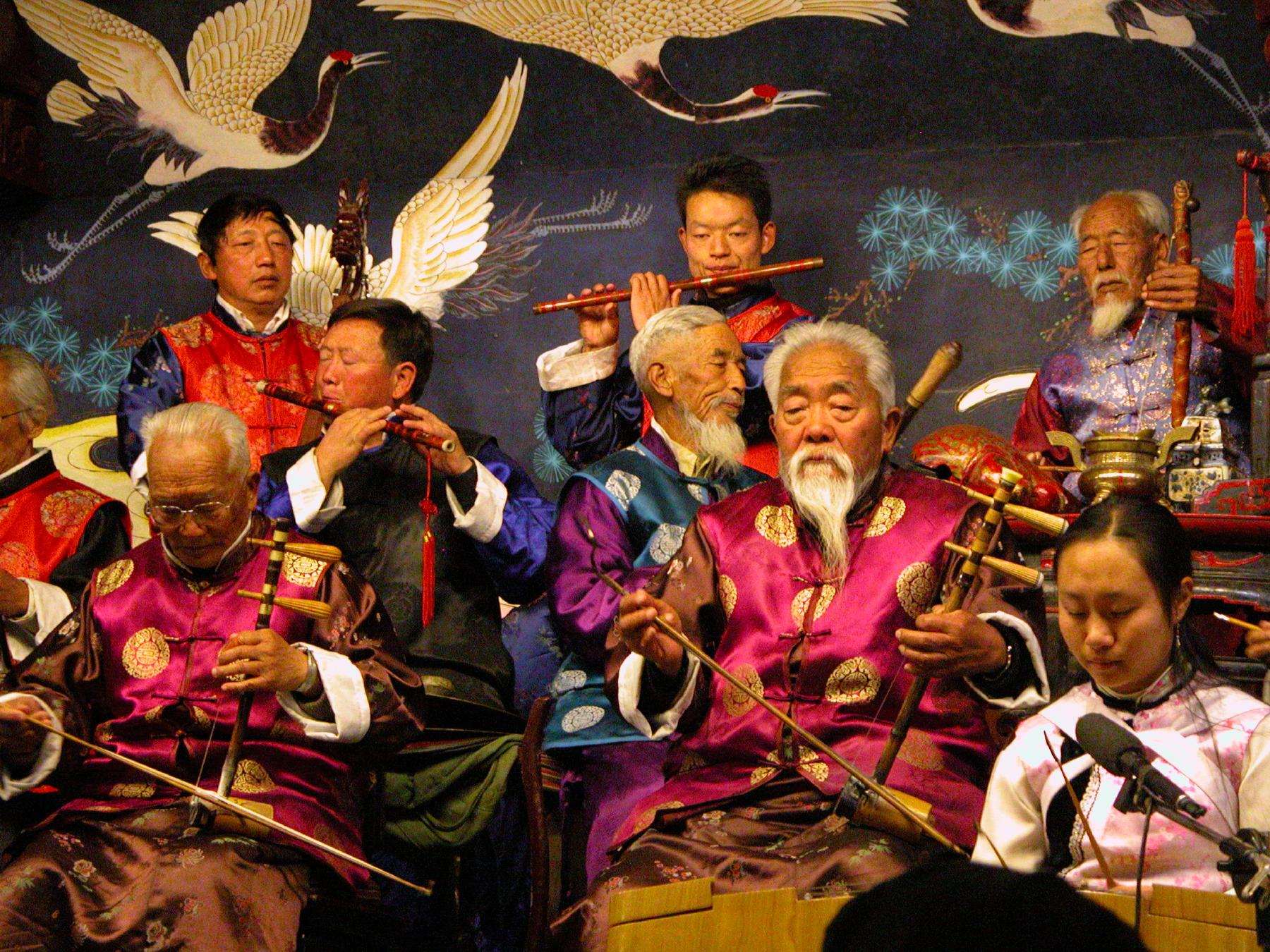
Nakhi musicians

=== Baisha xiyue ===
Supposedly introduced to the Nakhi by Kublai Khan when he conquered the Kingdom of Dali and received help from a Nakhi leader named Mailiang, basha xiyue is performed by orchestras. There are 24 simple, energetic qupai (tunes) in use.

=== Dongjing ===

Dongjing uses a type of traditional musical notation called gongchepu. There are traditional dongjing operas, such as Song of the Water Dragon, Waves Washing the Sands and The Sheep on the Hill.

Dongjing is a type of ritual music, said to have been sung by Taoist monks in the area. It was introduced at least by the AD 13th century, and is now known only in Yunnan and the distant city of Chengde (in Hebei) and Chifeng (in Inner Mongolia). Dongjing is traditional performed during the Chinese Lunar New Year. The President of the Dayan Naxi Ancient Music Association, Xuan Ke, has claimed that donjing originated from the religious and imperial music of the Tang and Song dynasties . (thus placing its origins between 618 and 1279). This same period saw the developed of ci poetry, which accompanied music led by stringed instruments.

By the 1980s, dongjing had mostly died out. It has since been revived, however, and its popularity among the younger generation is rebounding, especially in Chuxiong, Lijiang, Baoshan, Dali and Kunming. The Dayan Naxi Ancient Music Association was formed in 1987 to help revive donjing. Renowned modern performers include Peng Youshan and Lei Hong'an.
