= Qupai =

Melody generic term used in traditional Chinese music

A qupai (Chinese: 曲牌; pinyin: qǔpái; also called Chinese: 牌子; pinyin: paizi) is the generic term for a fixed melody used in traditional Chinese music. The literal meaning is "named tune," "labeled melody," "titled tune," or "titled song". Qupai are relatively brief, most comprising between 20 and 70 measures in 2/4 meter. Many qupai are centuries old, but only a few of these have been handed down to the present.

Qupai are commonly used in Chinese opera, such as kunqu and Beijing opera, as well as by folk and ritual ensembles, including Jiangnan sizhu and Taoist ritual music. Qupai have also been used as the basis for 20th century compositions for Chinese instruments, both solo and ensemble. In these contexts, these stock melodies very often serve as a basis for melodic elaboration and variation. This variation is particularly well codified in the taoqu structure of Chaozhou xianshi music.

The Baisha xiyue tradition of the Naxi of Lijiang, Yunnan utilizes 24 qupai.

== Notable qupai ==
- Ba Ban (Chinese: 八板; pinyin: Bā Bǎn; lit. 'Eight Beats')
- Huang Ying Liang Chi (黄莺亮翅; Huáng Yīng Liàng Chì; 'Oriole Spreading Wings')
- Jiang Jun Ling (将军令; Jiāng Jūn Lìng; 'General’s Command')
- Liu Qingniang (柳青娘; Liǔ Qīngniáng; 'a female name')
- Qiansheng Fo (千声佛; Qiān Shēng Fó; 'A Thousand Buddhas')
- Shuilong Yin (水龙吟; Shuǐ Lóong Yín; 'Water Loong Chant')
- Wannian Huan (万年欢; Wàn Nián Huān; 'Joy of Ten Thousand Years')
- Xijiang Yue (西江月; Xī Jiāng Yuè; 'Moon over the Western River')
- Wushan Ding (巫山顶; Wū Shān Dǐng; 'Summit of Mount Wushan')
- Ji (即; Jí) / Wu San Dian (五三点; Wǔ Sān Diǎn; 'Five-Three Beat Pattern')
- Wu Bangzi (五梆子; Wǔ Bāngzi; 'Five Bangzi')
- Tui Luzhou (推辘轴; Tuī Lùzhóu; 'Turning the Axle')
- Shifan (十番; Shí Fān; 'Ten Ensembles / Ten Variations')
- Si Gong Zhu (四公主; Sì Gōngzhǔ; 'Fourth Princess')

== See also ==
- Xiaodiao
- Cipai
