= Teochew string music =

Music genre

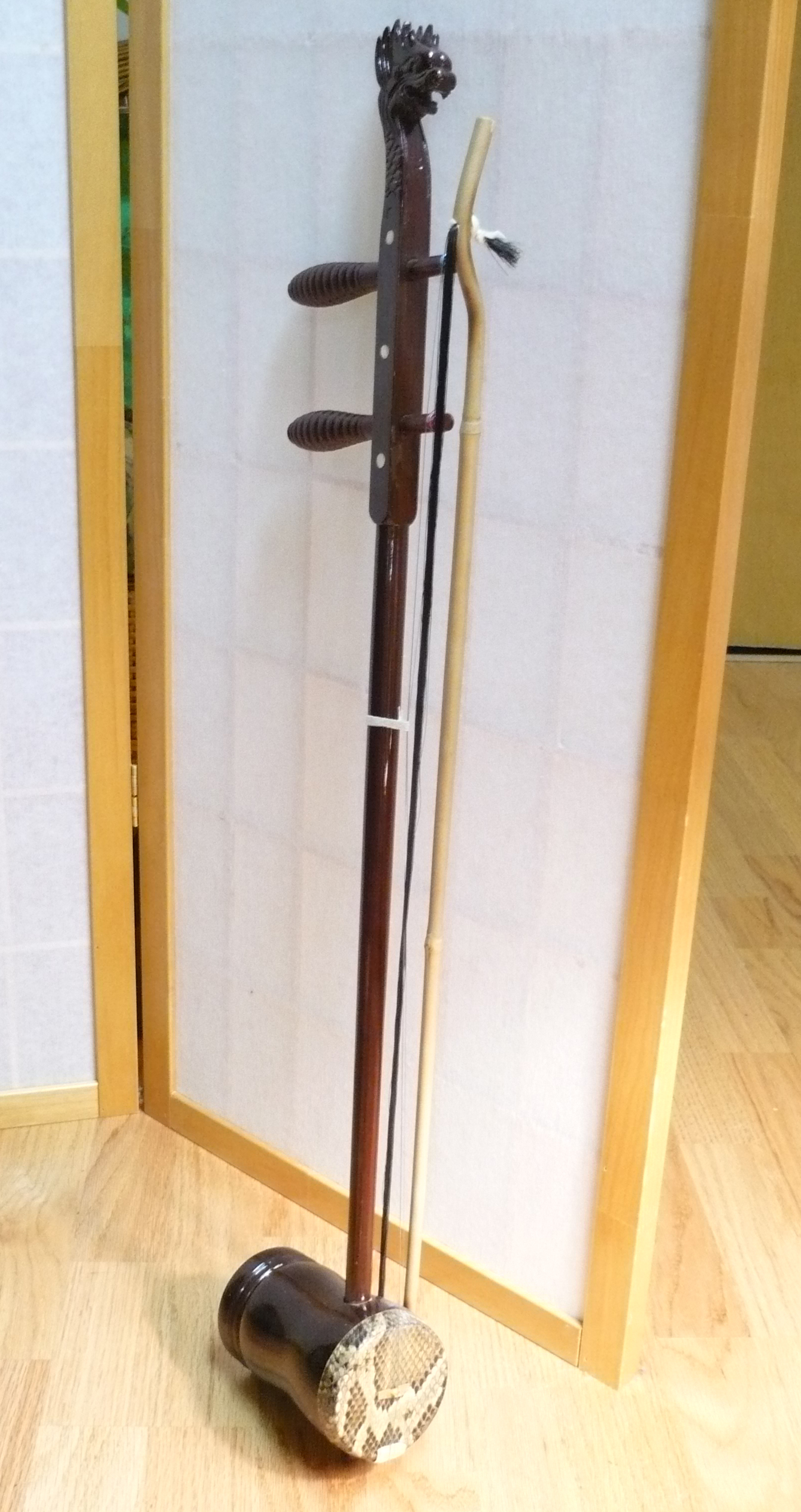
A Chaozhou tihu

Teochew string music or Chaozhou xianshi (simplified Chinese: 潮州弦诗; traditional Chinese: 潮州弦詩; lit. 'Chaozhou string-poem' also called "string-poem music") is classed as a type of sizhu music (chamber music for strings and woodwind, literally 'silk/bamboo') although it typically uses stringed instruments only. It is found in northeastern Guangdong and parts of Fujian and also in regions with overseas Teochew populations, such as Malaysia, Singapore, Thailand, and the United States. The Chaoshan region of Guangdong, bordering on Fujian and comprising the cities of Chaozhou, Shantou and Jieyang, forms its own cultural sphere. Teahouses often accompany with Chaozhou music.

== History ==
Developed from a fusion of elements, popular song, arias of Chinese opera, ancient melodies and pieces of Buddhist music, string music falls into two styles: Rujia yue (儒家樂) is music of the Confucian school that can be performed as an independent instrumental music genre or at weddings and other ceremonies and that aims at elegance and nobility, while Pengding yue (棚頂樂) is principally the music of the theatre, though it may be played independently: it cultivates a sober, rustic style.

== Instruments ==
The most commonly used instruments include several varieties of two‑stringed bowed lutes: the erxian (二弦), also called touxian (頭弦) when used as the lead instrument in the Hakka style—shorter and higher‑pitched than the standard erxian; the tihu (提胡), a lower‑pitched instrument derived from the Cantonese gaohu (高胡); and the large and small yehu (椰胡), distinguished by their coconut‑shell resonators.

A range of plucked lutes is also employed, including the pipa (琵琶), the large and small sanxian (三弦, three‑stringed, fretless lutes comparable to the Japanese shamisen), the qinqin (秦琴, four‑stringed, with a short fretted neck and round body), the ruan (阮, four‑stringed, with a long fretted neck and round body), and the meihuaqin (梅花琴, a variant of qinqin).

In addition, ensembles often feature the zheng (箏), a long zither that is also the ancestor of the Vietnamese đàn tranh, and the yangqin (揚琴), a hammered dulcimer believed to have originated from the Iranian santur.

Percussion instruments include the paiban (檀板), a pair of "temple" blocks (daban and fuban) that mark the beat, and the small drum (哲鼓). In some regional styles, particularly those associated with the Shantou area, the cello is occasionally incorporated to reinforce the bass line.

== Characteristics ==
The ten characteristic compositions of xianshi yue are

- Zhaojun Yuan (昭君怨, 'Grief of Wang Zhaojun')
- Xiaotaohong (小桃红, 'Little Peach Red')
- Hanya Xishui (寒鸦戲水, 'Jackdaws Play in the Water')
- Huangli Ci (黃鸝詞, 'The Oriole's Cry')
- Yue'er Gao (月儿高, 'High Moon')
- Dababan (大八板, 'Great Eight Beats')
- Pingsha Luoyan (平沙落雁, 'Flock of Geese on the Shore')
- Fengqiuhuang (鳳求凰, 'The Male Phoenix Seeks the Female')
- Wulianhuan (五連環, 'Five Knots of the Chain')
- Jinshang Tianhua (錦上添花, 'Adding Flowers upon Brocade')

The form of each of these pieces resembles a suite (taoqu) of variations upon a stock melody (qupai or 'noted tune'). These are called ban or 'beat' variations and follow an ordered sequence with changes of tempo and measure (most pieces have six or eight beat measures). Augmentation and diminution of the melody is used, so that it may repeatedly double in speed through the variations. The technique of cui introduces a division-like filling in of the melody with figures such as repeated notes and neighbouring or passing notes. Perfect-fourth transposition of the melody (fan) also occurs, though the tonal centre remains constant.

Four or five main modes (diao) are traditionally identified. However, while elsewhere in China such modes are mainly defined by absolute pitch and by the degree of the pentatonic scale that is taken as the key-note (thus setting the intervals of the scale), the xianshi conception of mode, rather like the Indian raga system, includes motif, ornament and intonation. Pitch is not absolute but the scale is usually constructed on a key-note approximating to western concert F – F♯. Modes are pentatonic but all derive from a seven-note scale: no notice is taken of the starting and finishing tones of the melody in determining the mode and the key-note remains the same in every mode. Tunes may be adapted to a new mode, but the mode remains constant throughout any performance of the suite.

Apart from the major pentatonic scale two further tones, corresponding to a (sharp) perfect fourth and a (flat) major seventh, are employed. The "missing" steps of the scale in each mode may be used in ornament but are not part of main mode structure. The mode qingsan qingliu ("Light III Light VI") is the standard major pentatonic. But qingsan zhongliu ("Light III Heavy VI") calls for a heavy string-pressure upon the sixth degree, raising it to the seventh. Zhongsan zhongliu ("Heavy III Heavy VI"), similarly, applies this upward string-bend to the third degree as well, raising it to the fourth. The fourth common scale, called Huowu ("Live V"), resembles this last but avoids the plain third degree and instead uses a heavy vibrato on the second degree. This is said to be the most characteristic mode of the region.

Chaozhou drum music includes the big drum and gong, the small drum and gong, the dizi set drum and dong and su drum and gong ensembles. The current Chaozhou drum music is said to be similar to the form of the drum and wind music of the Han and Tang dynasties.
