= Guban (instrument) =

Traditional Chinese percussion instrument combination

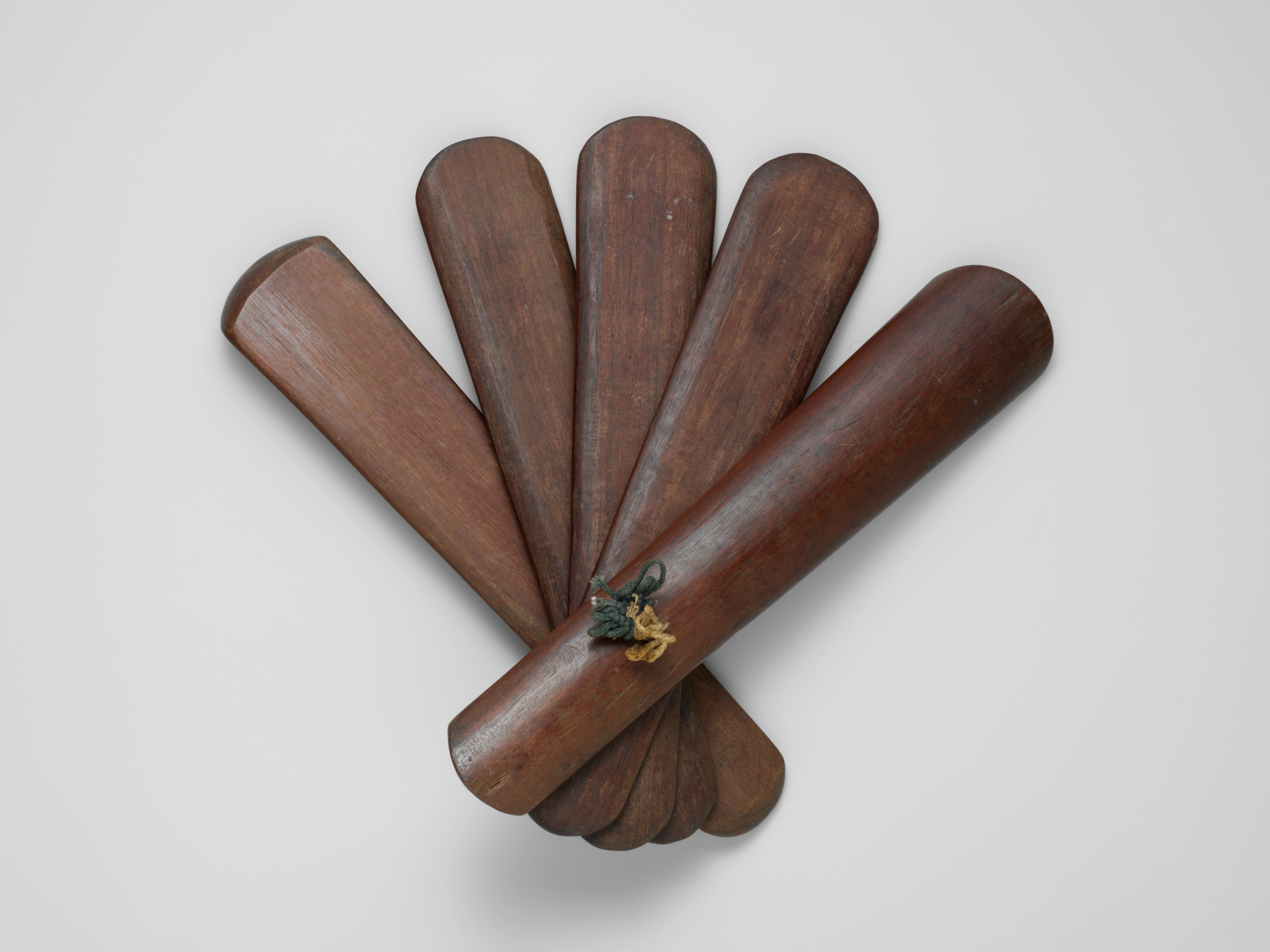
- A paiban (wooden clapper), one of the two primary components of the guban percussion set, in the collection of the Metropolitan Museum of Art
- Other names: Gǔbǎn (鼓板)
- Classification: Idiophone (clapper) and membranophone (drum)
- Hornbostel–Sachs classification: 111.12 (concussion idiophones) and 211.2 (tubular/frame drums)
- Developed: China

Related instruments
- Paiban; Bangu; Bangzi

The term guban (Chinese: 鼓板; pinyin: gǔbǎn) refers collectively to a small drum and a paiban (clapper), which are played simultaneously by a single musician in traditional Chinese music. In many traditional Chinese theatrical and instrumental ensembles, the guban player serves as the rhythmic leader and conductor, directing tempo, entrances, and dramatic cues.

== Structure and materials ==
The guban pairs two contrasting percussion instruments—a membranophone (drum) and an idiophone (clapper):

- Drum (gu): In Beijing opera and other northern Chinese operatic traditions, the drum is typically a bangu (Chinese: 板鼓; pinyin: bǎngǔ), also known as danpigu (Chinese: 单皮鼓; pinyin: dānpígǔ; lit. 'single-skin drum'), which features a small, high-pitched head capable of producing crisp, penetrating strokes. In regional chamber genres such as Jiangnan sizhu, other small high-pitched drums such as the biqigu, diangu, or huaigu are commonly paired with the clapper.
- Clapper (ban): The clapper is known variously as pāibǎn (拍板), bǎn (板), tánbǎn (檀板; 'sandalwood clapper'), mùbǎn (木板), or shūbǎn (书板). It consists of two flat slabs of hardwood—typically zitan, hongmu, or hualimu rosewood—or bamboo tied loosely together at one end. Somewhat confusingly, the clapper is sometimes also referred to as guban even when played without the drum.

== Playing technique and musical role ==
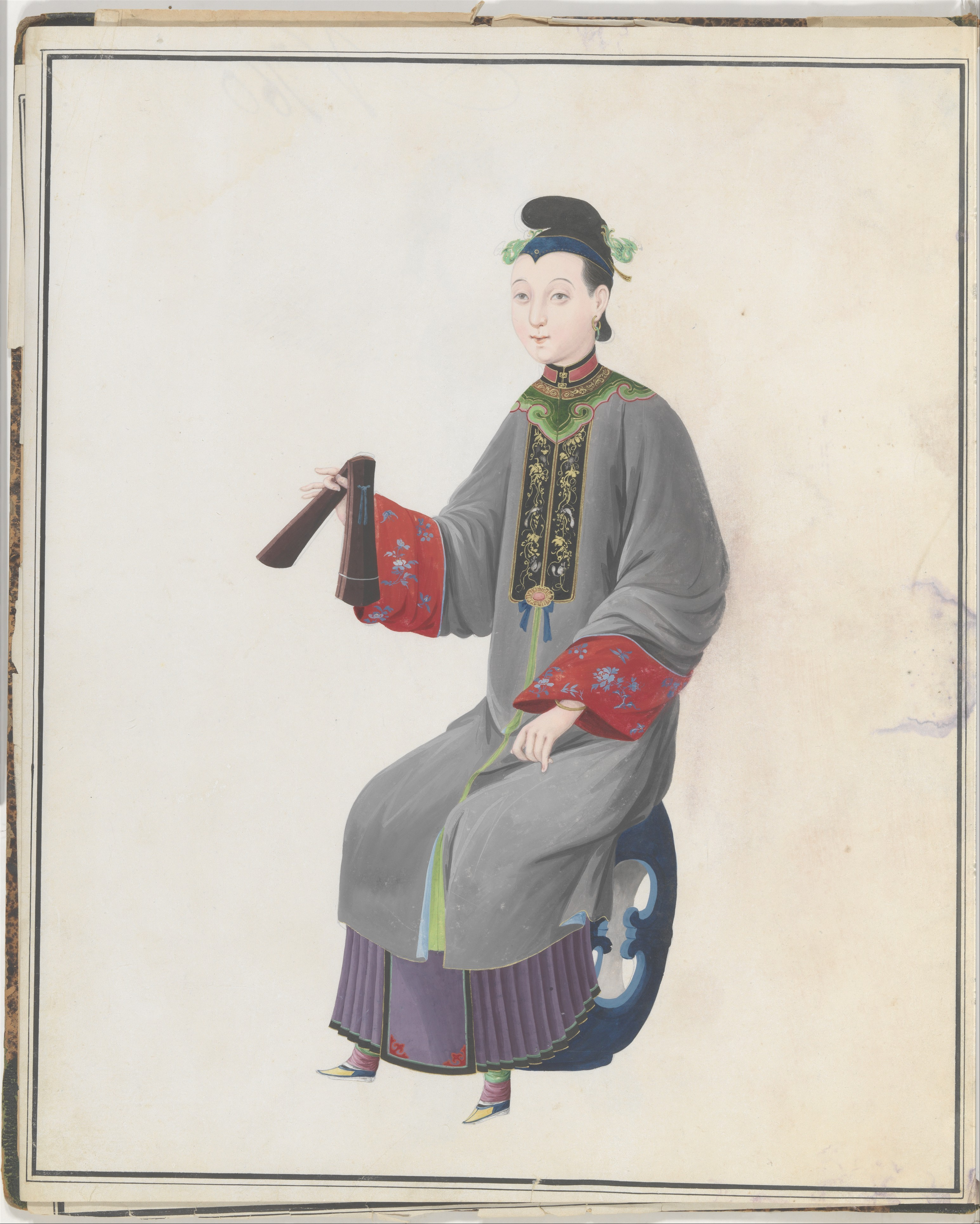
Watercolor depicting a Chinese musician playing the paiban, Metropolitan Museum of Art

The guban is played by a single percussionist. The clapper is held vertically in the left hand and clapped together to produce a sharp, dry clacking sound, while the right hand holds a thin bamboo stick to strike the small drum mounted on a stand or table. When rapid drumming passages are required, the player may set the clapper down and use two sticks on the drum.

In Beijing opera and traditional ensembles, the guban player is customarily the most experienced musician in the group. The instrument governs the banqiang (Chinese: 板腔) metrical system, in which strong accented beats are marked by the ban (clapper) while weaker beats and rhythmic subdivisions are articulated on the drum. Through variations in tempo, dynamics, and rhythmic patterns, the player cues vocalists, coordinates ensemble transitions, and punctuates stage action and dialogue.

== Usage ==
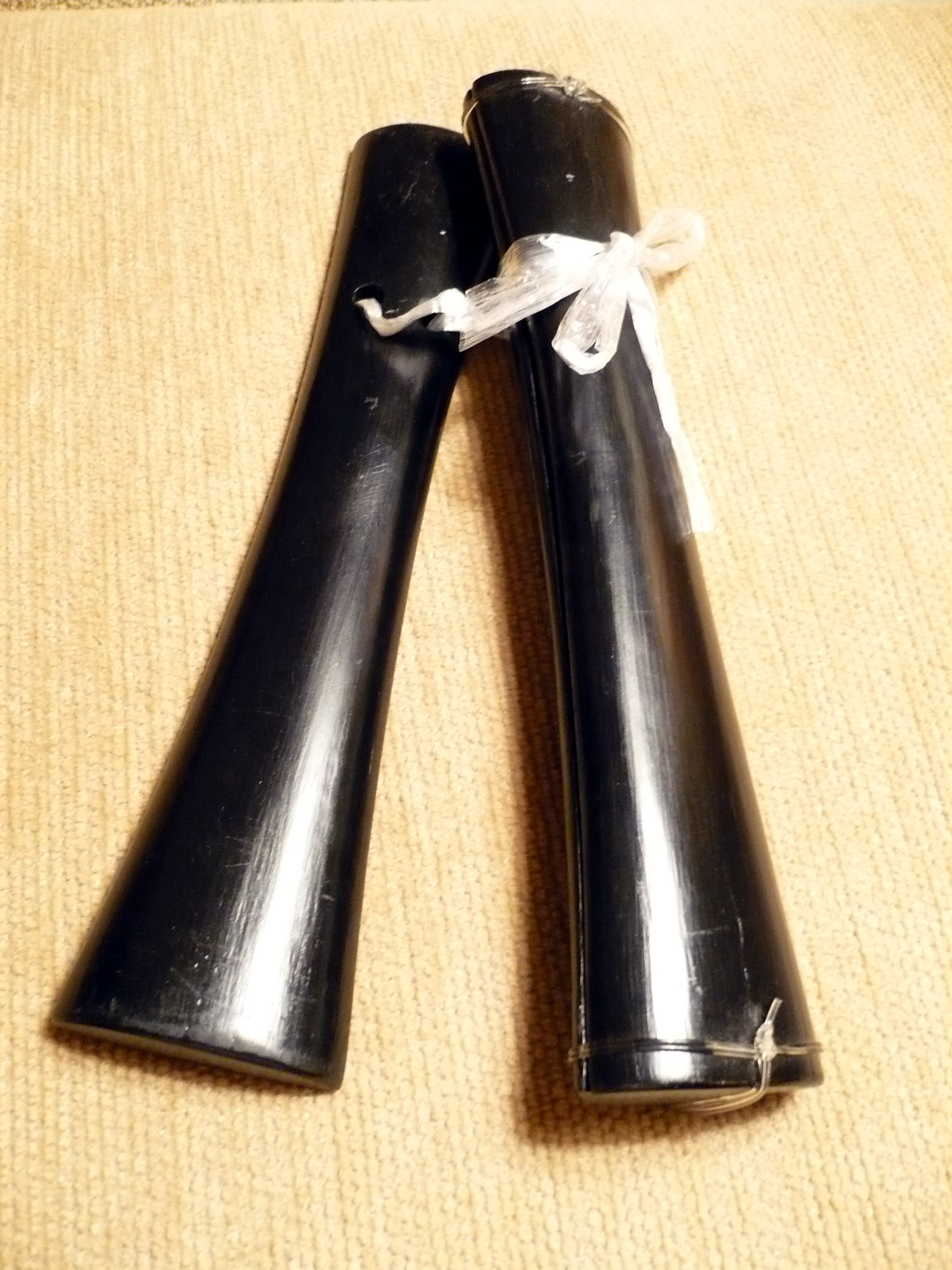
A paiban used in Chaozhou traditional music

The guban is used across a wide range of traditional Chinese vocal, theatrical, and instrumental genres:

- Narrative singing: It accompanies several genres of shuochang (Chinese story-singing), providing rhythmic structure and dramatic emphasis for the storyteller.
- Chinese opera: It forms the core of the percussion section in Beijing opera, kunqu, and Yue opera.
- Instrumental ensembles: It is featured in regional instrumental traditions including Jiangnan sizhu, Chaozhou instrumental music, Sunan chuida (苏南吹打), nanguan, shifan luogu (十番锣鼓), and Shanxi batao (山西八套).

== See also ==
- Paiban
- Bangu (drum)
- Bamboo clapper
- Whip (instrument)
