= Old Town of Lijiang =

UNESCO World Heritage Site in Yunnan, China

UNESCO World Heritage Site
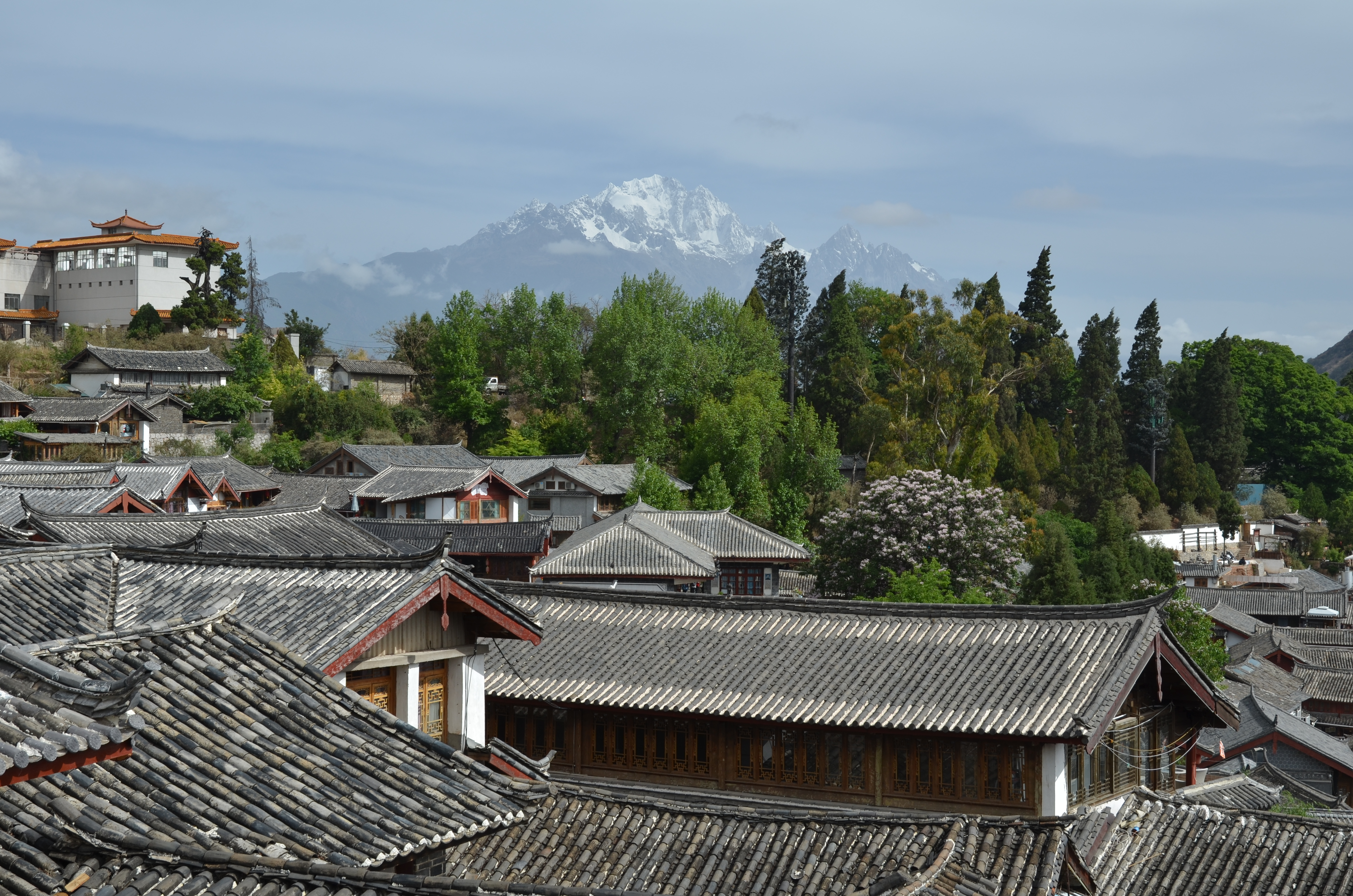
- View of Old Town of Lijiang, with Yulong Snow Mountain in the back

- Location within Yunnan Location within China
- Location: Lijiang, Yunnan, China
- Criteria: Cultural: (ii), (iv), (v)
- Reference: 811bis
- Inscription: 1997 (21st Session)
- Extensions: 2012
- Area: 145.6 ha (360 acres)
- Buffer zone: 582.3 ha (1,439 acres)
- Coordinates: 26°52′N 100°14′E

Old Town of Lijiang
- Traditional Chinese: 麗江古城
- Simplified Chinese: 丽江古城
Transcriptions
Standard Mandarin
- Hanyu Pinyin: Lìjiāng Gǔchéng
- Wade–Giles: Li4-chiang1 Ku3-ch'eng2

Dayan
- Chinese: 大研
Transcriptions
Standard Mandarin
- Hanyu Pinyin: Dàyán
- Wade–Giles: Ta4-yen2

Dayan (Chinese: 大研), commonly called the Old Town of Lijiang (simplified Chinese: 丽江古城; traditional Chinese: 麗江古城) is the historical center of Lijiang City, in Yunnan, China. It is a UNESCO World Heritage Site.

== History ==
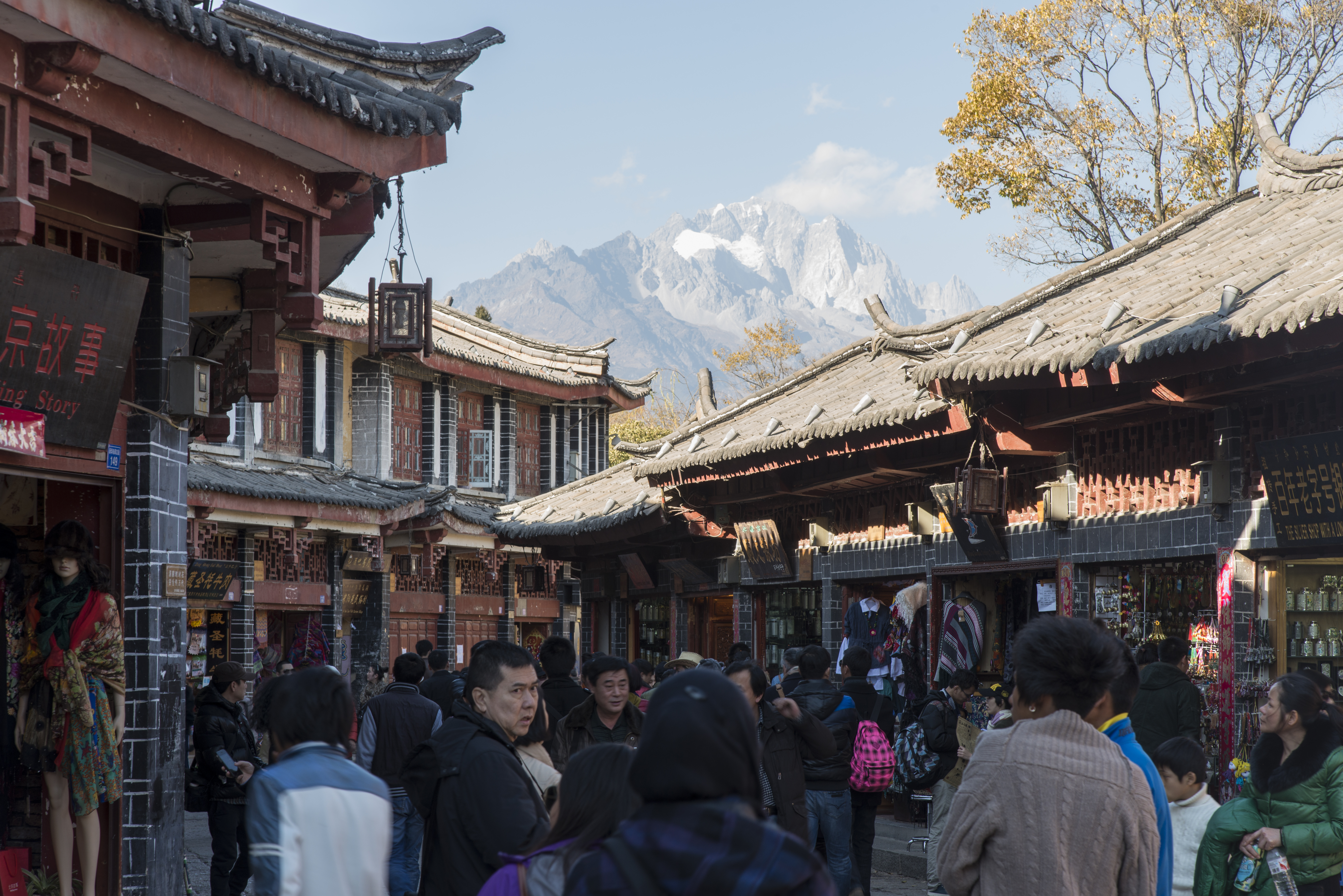
Shops along the street with Jade Dragon Snow Mountain in the background

The town has a history going back more than 1,000 years and was once a confluence for trade along the "Old Tea Horse Caravan Trail". Dayan old town is famous for its orderly system of waterways and bridges, which were impacted by a drop in the water table caused by climate change and a sudden rise in mass tourism. Government changes in the water supply system restored the system's effectiveness.

Lijiang's culture combines traditional Nakhi culture and elements learned from Ming dynasty Han Chinese traders who settled in the region centuries ago. Nakhi people have kept alive a timber and mud brick housing style which they learned from Nanjing traders. Local carpenters still build elaborately constructed timber house frames from memory without blueprints or other diagrams. These houses are often enhanced by detailed flower and bird carvings on the windows. The carvings are now made by ethnic Bai artisans, but attention is given to depicting the flora and fauna of the four seasons in the traditional Han Chinese manner. Even impoverished farming families gather their resources to install carved windows. The window panels are available for sale to tourists.

The old town is the historic centre of the Naxi, whose ritual specialists recorded texts in the dongba script, a primarily logographic system conventionally described as pictographic.

The Nakhi people learned Chinese classical music from the visitors from Nanjing during the Ming Dynasty and continue to play that music even to this day, long after the art died out in other parts of China. The old musicians regularly perform in Dayan old town and less often in the outlying villages.

Side by side with this well preserved evidence of Han culture resides Nakhi local culture, and this can be seen in the old town and on many street corners even today in the form of circle dances, attended by young and old from the local neighborhoods. The Dayan old town circle dances are led by Hakhi women in local Nakhi costume.

Circle dancing in costume is also a custom of the Tibetan people to the north of Lijiang and of the Bai people to the south. Previously there were substantial Tibetan and Bai settlements in Dayan old town but most of these people have been resettled to districts away from the tourist areas. Tibetan circle dancing can be seen occasionally in Dayan and more regularly in private gardens and Nongjiale (农家乐) gatherings of local Tibetans. Both Nakhi and Tibetan circle dancing are practiced outside of the town's Tibetan temples Wenfeng Si (文峰寺) on Wenbifeng (文笔峰) Mountain, Zhiyun Si (指云寺) near Lashi Hai Lake (拉市海), and Fuguo Si (富国寺) on Jade Dragon Mountain (玉龙雪山), especially on temple festival days.

Greater Lijiang, including Dayan and two villages to the north, Baisha (白沙) and Shuhe (束河), was registered on the UNESCO World Heritage List on December 4, 1997. About two years earlier, the area had been hit by a devastating earthquake, which necessitated reconstruction of numerous old town structures. The local and regional government carried out reconstruction of local traditional dwellings, and overall development, in accordance with UNESCO World Heritage Centre guidance and standards.

International and Chinese tourism increased greatly after the UNESCO designation. Booming tourism, while not altering the authentic physical appearance of the old town, has dramatically changed the social/cultural fabric and land use there. 90 to 95% of local residents moved out of the old town area because they could rent their homes there to entrepreneurs for very high rents. As a result, over 90% of the land intended for residential use has been turned into commercial use properties like guesthouses, shops and restaurants. A tourist staying in an old town hotel commented, “without a doubt, Lijiang is the best historic town in China, very ancient, attractive and well protected; but I can hardly find natives, so it is more like a short-stay destination for tourists than a living town for Naxi people.”

== Culture ==
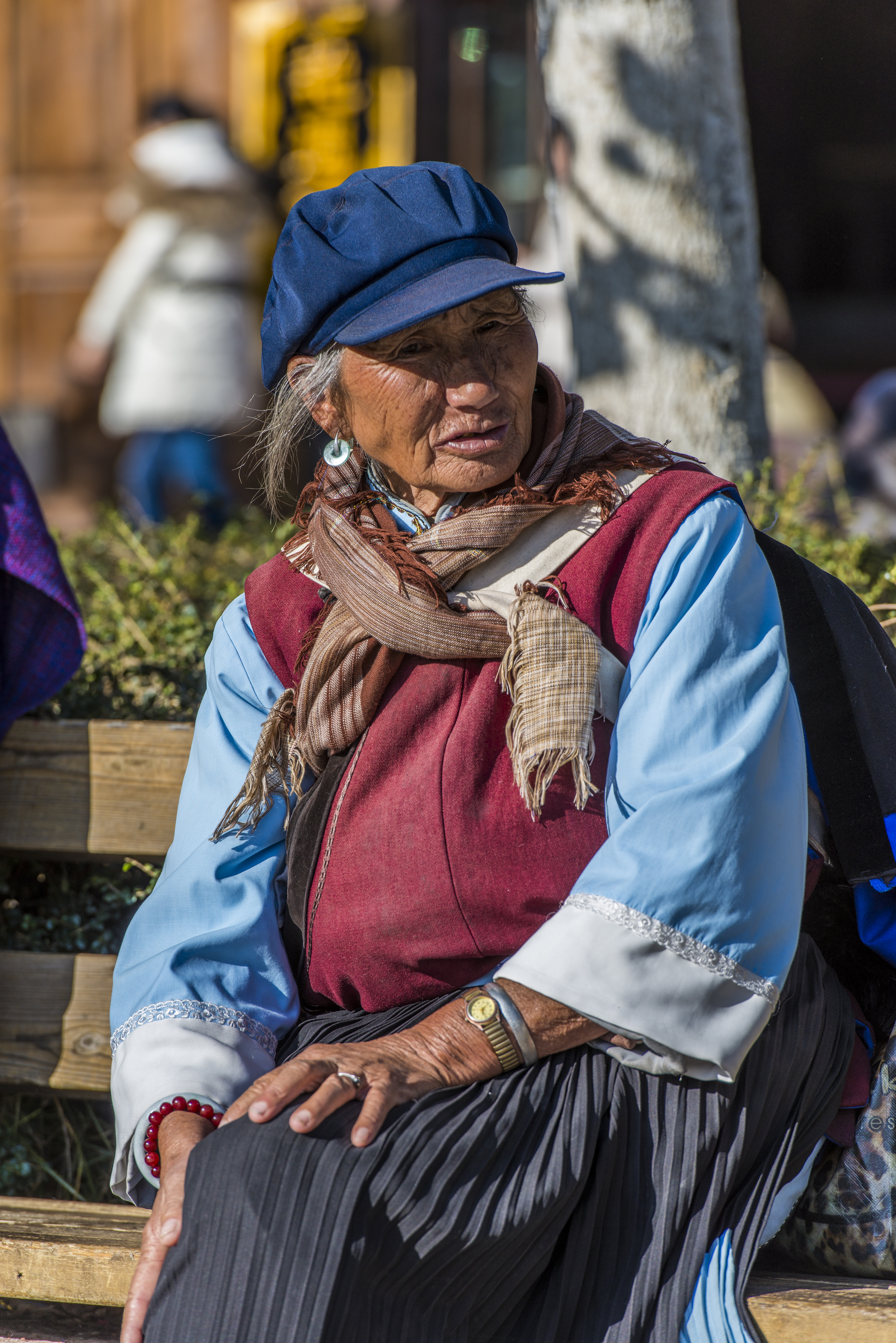
A Nakhi old woman in the town square

Performances by the Nakhi of Dongjing Music, an ancient form of Han Chinese ritual music, can be heard for a fee in Dayan and for a donation in Shuhe, Baisha and sometimes in other villages in the area. A pricy glamorization of the Tea and Horse Caravans is presented in the form of a musical organized by film producer and director Zhang Yimou.

== See also ==
- Shaxi, Yunnan: a nearby historical town in Jianchuan County on the ancient tea route.
- Three Parallel Rivers of Yunnan Protected Areas: a UNESCO Natural World Heritage area in the vicinity of Lijiang, comprising a number of dramatic natural gorges, river beds and lakes, as well as Lisu, Muoso, Yi, Tibetan and other ethnic villages.

== Recent changes ==
Panorama of the old town as seen from Wan Gu Lou

The influx of tourists that followed the inscription of the Ancient town of Lijiang onto UNESCO's World Heritage list has had dramatic effects. Most of the Nakhi inhabitants of the ancient city have moved away due to rising costs of housing and food items, only to be replaced by tourist establishments who pay huge rents to the Nakhi owners, now retired to the new town area. The growth of these tourism businesses is largely uncontrolled.

== Gallery ==
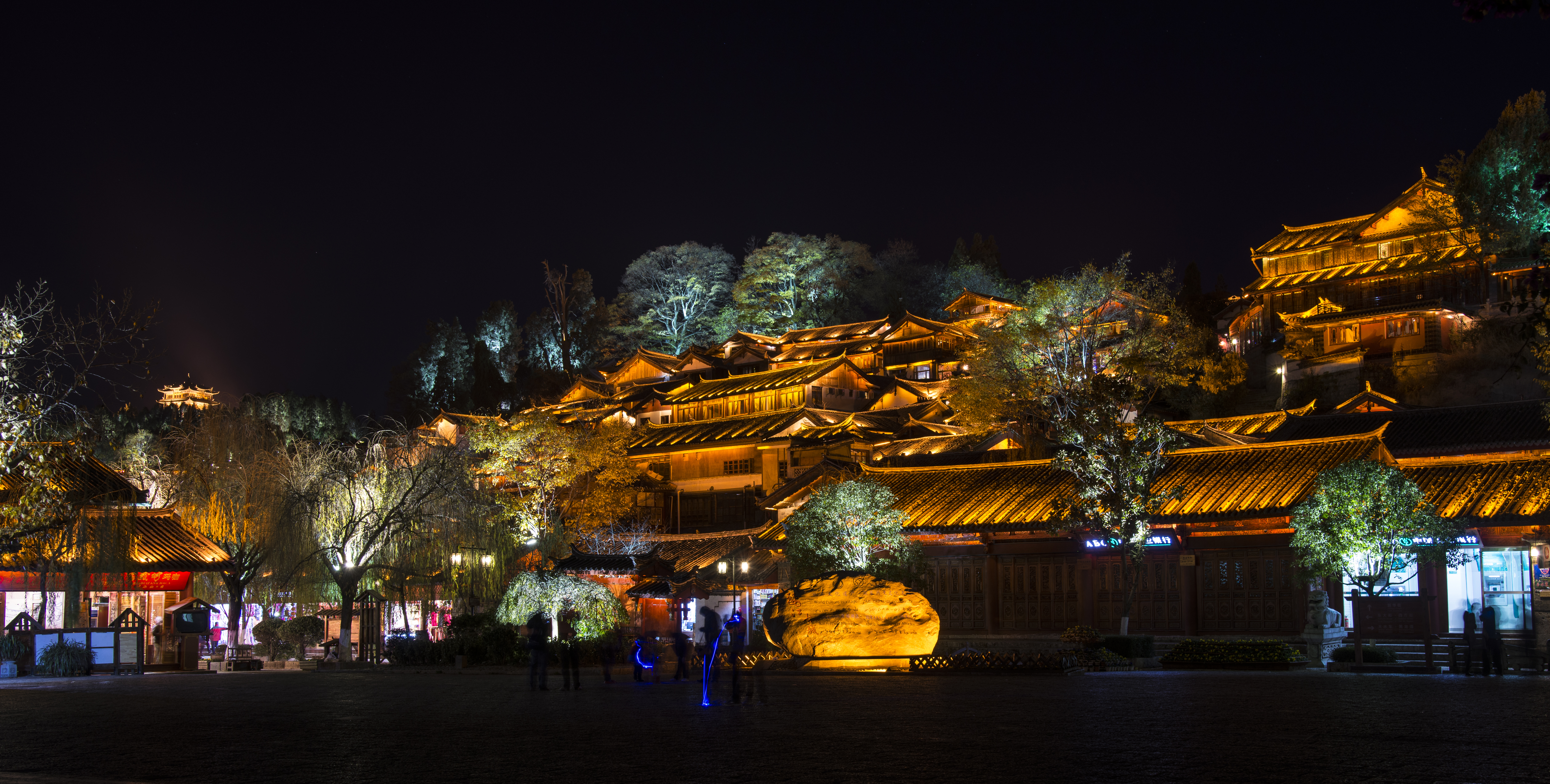
Lijiang at night

Lijiang at night

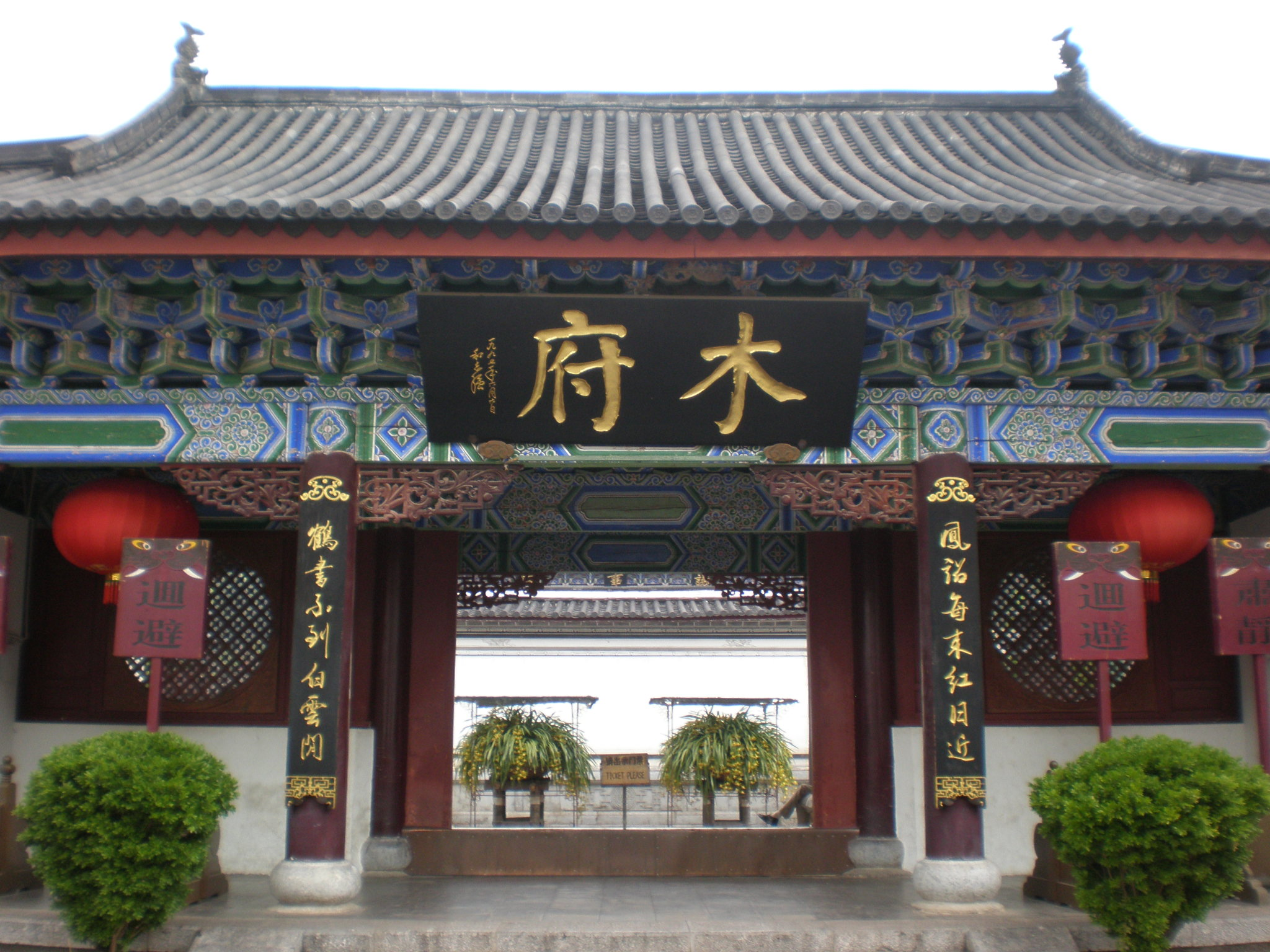
The entrance to the Mu Mansion

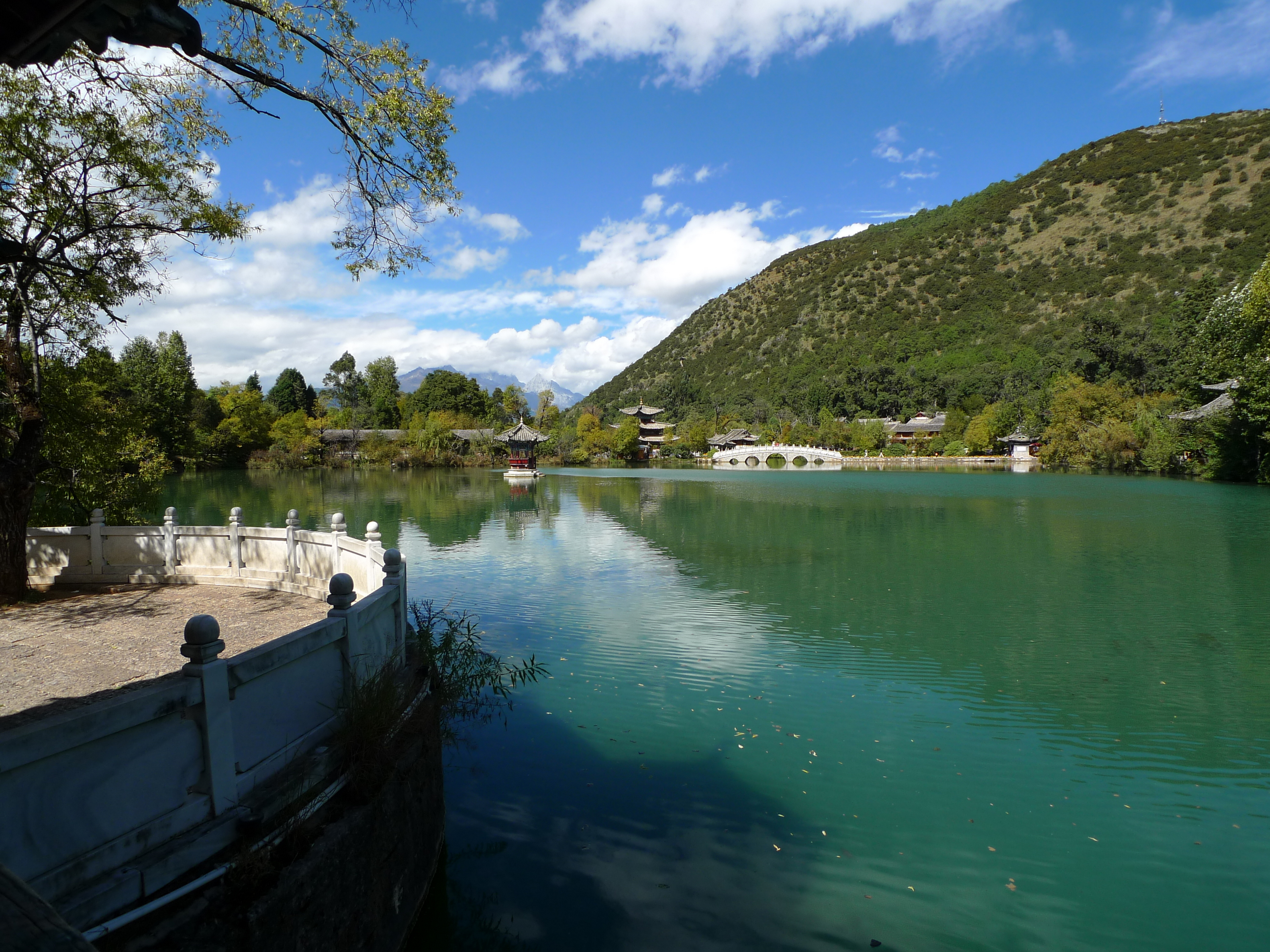
Black Dragon Lagoon
