= Bangu (drum) =

Chinese percussive instrument

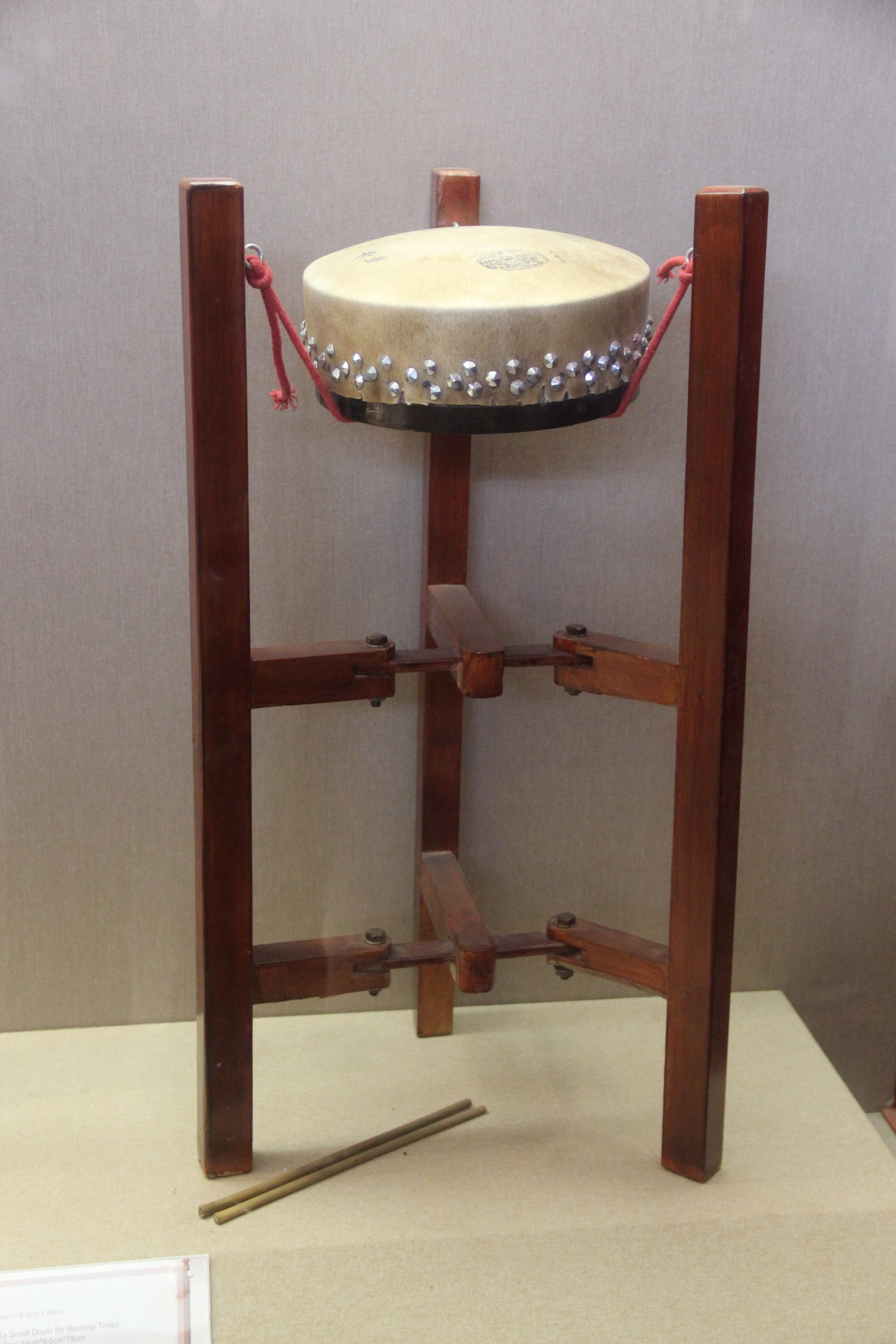
An example of a bangu drum

The bangu (Chinese: 板鼓; pinyin: bǎngǔ), often simply gu (Chinese: 鼓; pinyin: gǔ), is a Chinese frame drum that, when struck by one or two small bamboo sticks, creates a sharp dry sound essential to the aesthetics of Chinese opera. Striking the drum in different places produces different sounds. It is also used in many Chinese chamber music ensembles. The percussion section is very important in Chinese Opera, with battle or 'martial' scenes, which are called wu-chang. The bangu player is the director or conductor of the orchestra, working with the other members of the percussion section to create the right mood for the audience and actors on stage.

== Construction ==
The drum, which is about 25 cm (10 inches) in diameter and 10 cm (4 inches) deep. The frame of the Bangu drum is made of wedges of hard wood glued together to form a circle. Animal skin is then stretched over the frame of wedges, which is then secured by a metal band. The wedges do not reach the small area in the centre (the drum’s heart or "guxin") where the drum is struck. The bangu is held in its own stand with four iron rings.

Some versions have only three rings and three supporting legs. These versions are usually portable, with a collapsible stand section.

== Guban ==
When used together with paiban clappers (both played together by a single player, the paiban held in one hand and the bangu played with a stick held in the other) the two instruments are referred to collectively as guban (鼓板). Somewhat confusingly, the clapper is sometimes also referred to, without the drum, as guban.

When used as part of a guban, the bangu is used in several genres of shuochang (Chinese story-singing), as well as in Beijing opera, kunqu, and Yue opera.
