= Tihu (instrument) =

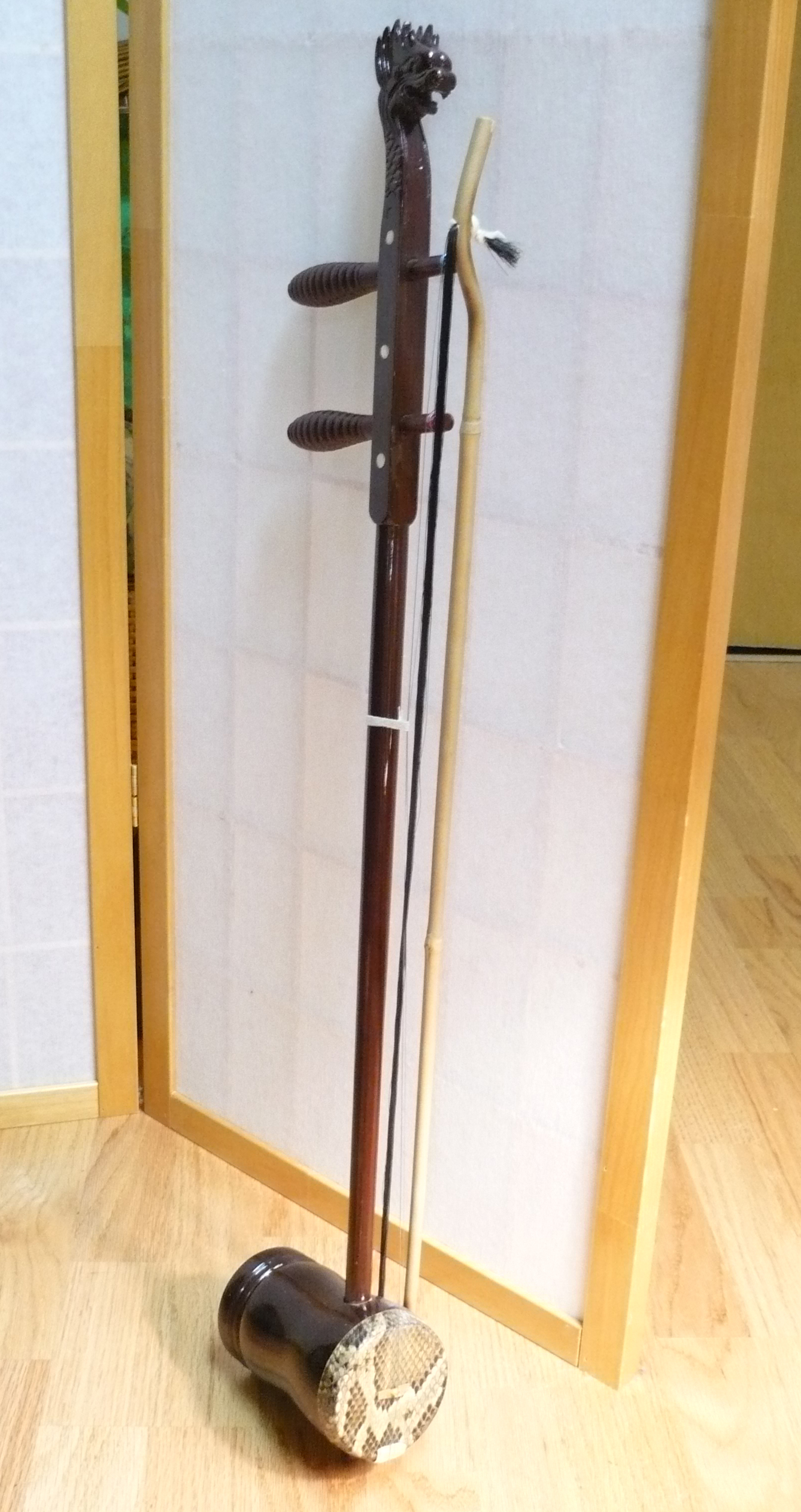
A Chaozhou tihu

The tihu (提胡; pinyin: tíhú) is a two-stringed bowed vertical fiddle in the huqin family, used in Chaozhou xianshi music of the Chaozhou people. It is an adaptation of the gaohu used in Cantonese music. It has a tubular hardwood body that is covered on the playing end with python skin. It is used in the Chaozhou people's original homeland of Chaozhou and Shantou, in eastern Guangdong, as well as in regions where Chaozhou people have immigrated, such as Thailand and Singapore.

The tihu is generally held with the resonator between the knees. It is considered a supporting instrument in the Chaozhou xianshi ensemble. It is tuned lower and plays in a slower, more lyrical fashion than does the leading fiddle, called erxian.

== Gallery ==
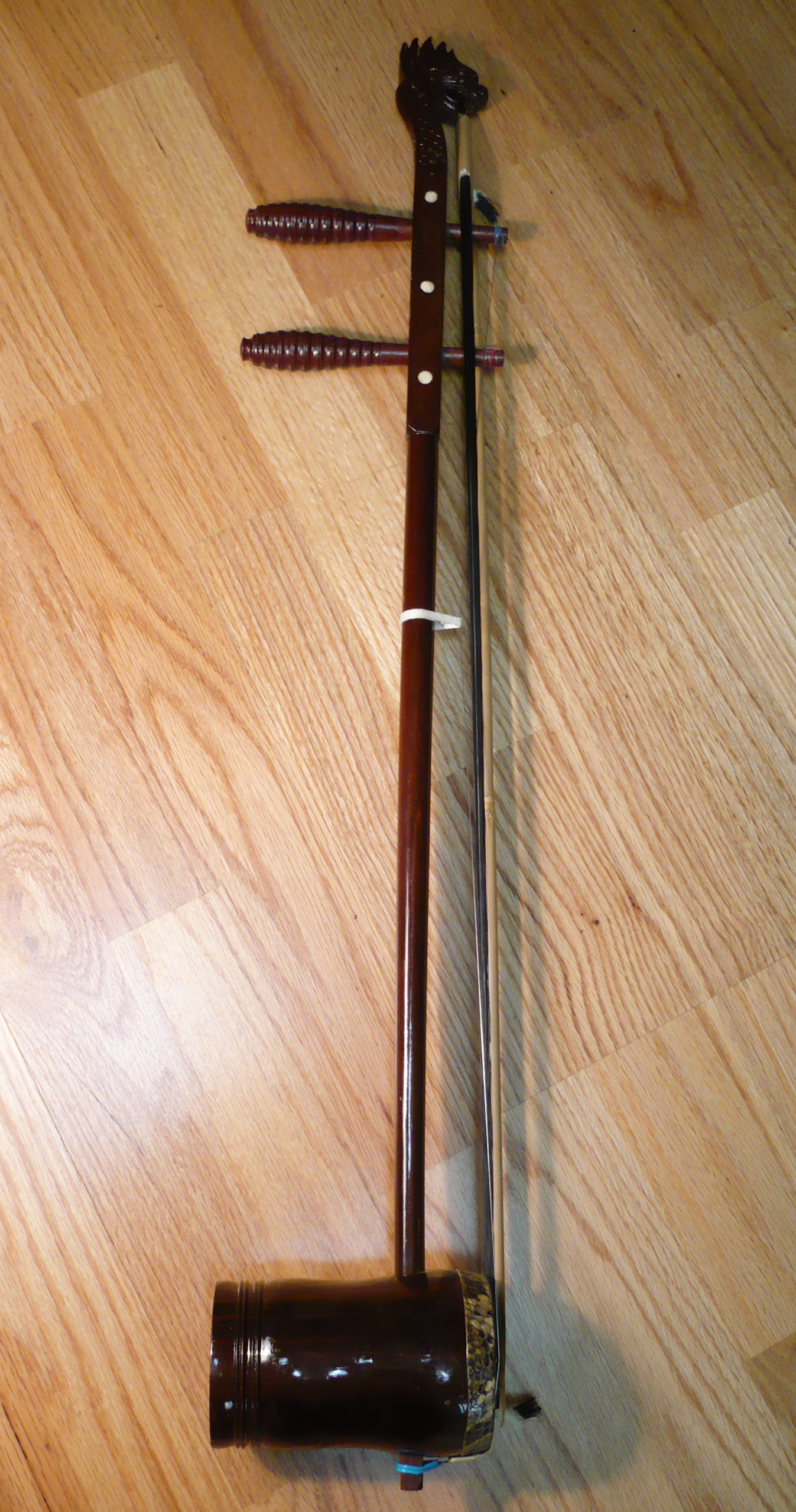
Side view of a Chaozhou tihu

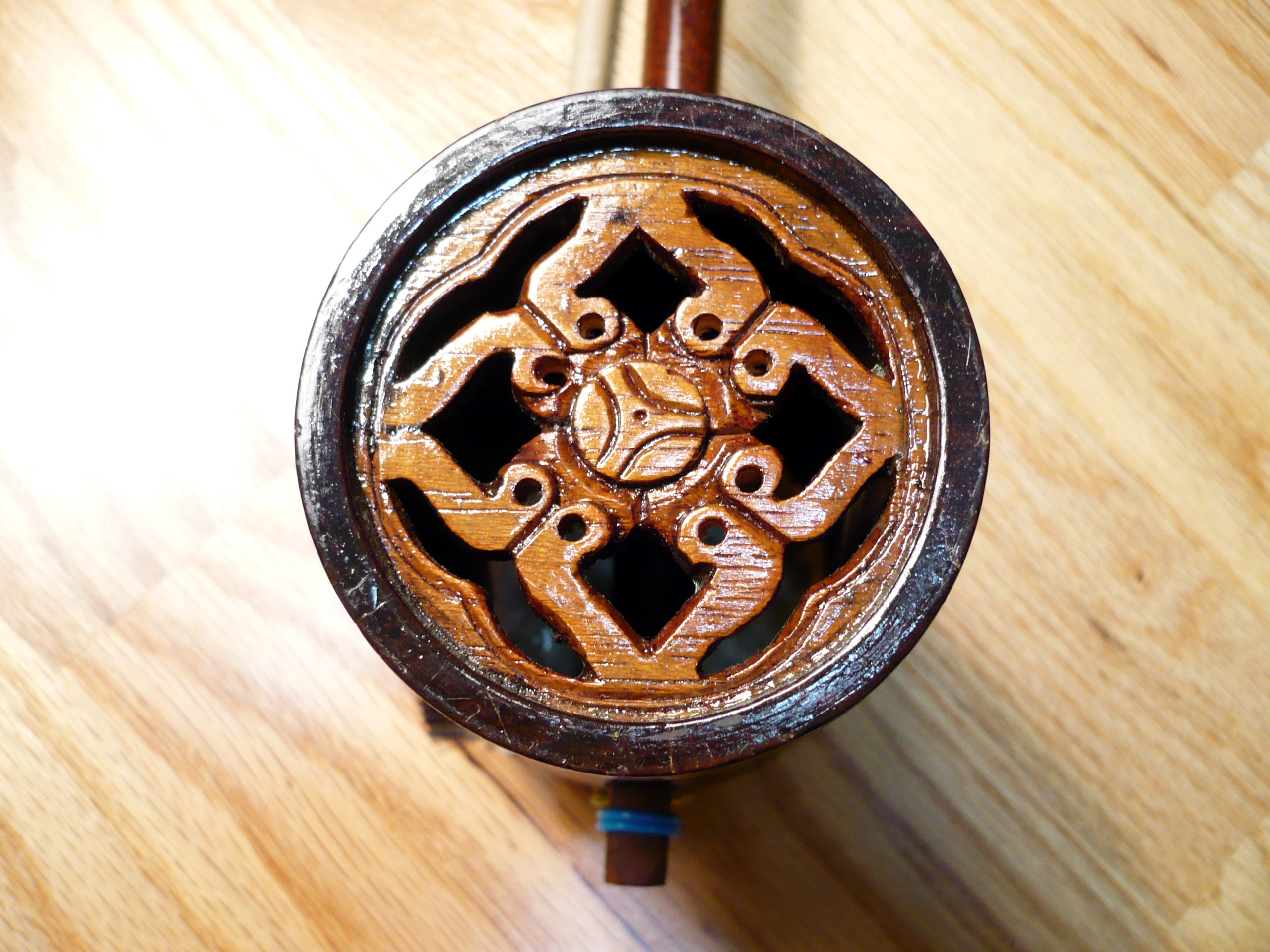
The carved back of a Chaozhou tihu
