= Dongjing (music) =

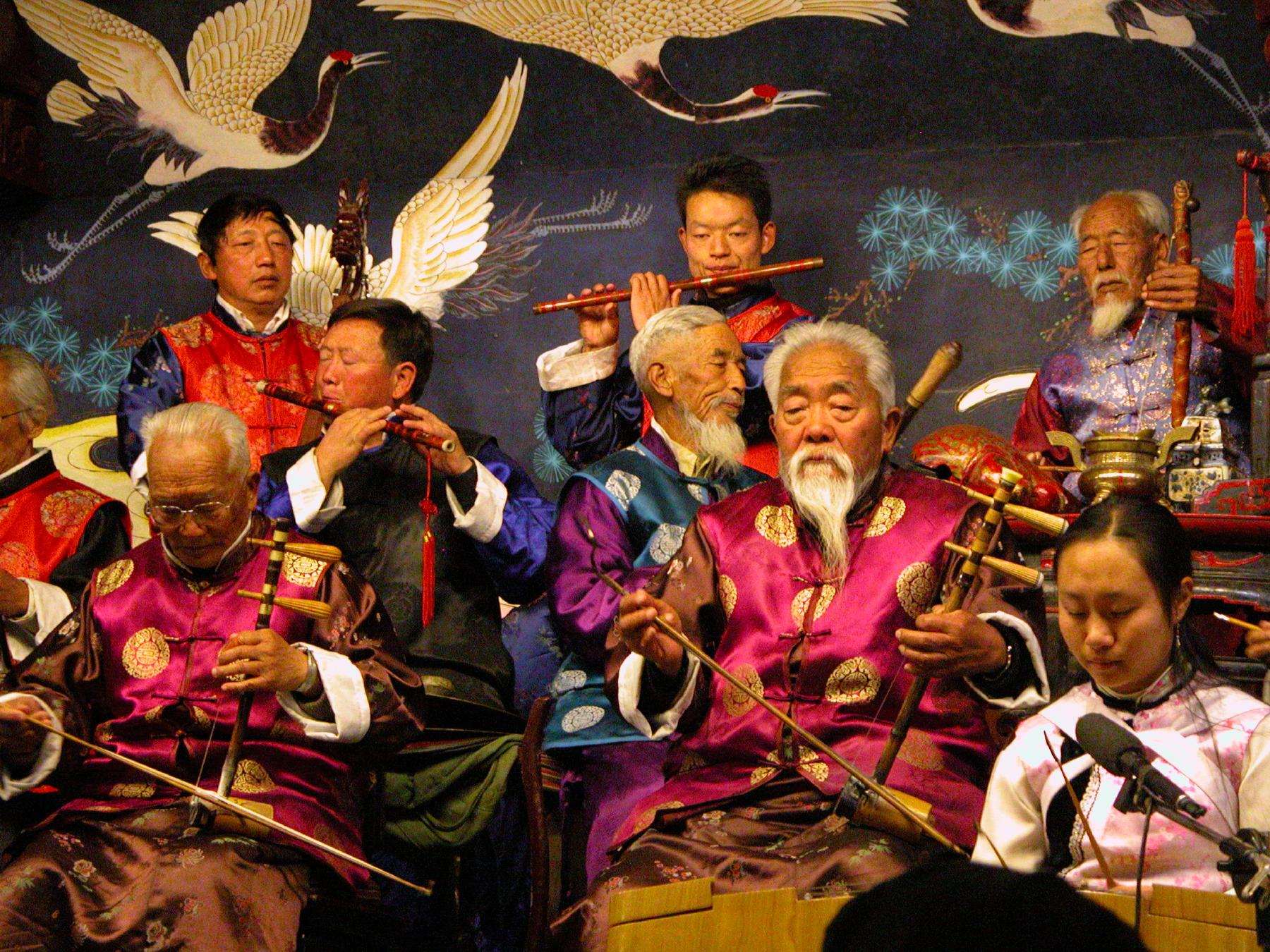
Dongjing musicians in Lijiang, Yunnan

Dongjing music (洞经音乐; dòngjīng yīnyuè) or donjiang is a type of Chinese ritual music traditionally performed by the Nakhi people, Han people, and Bai people of Yunnan province in southwest China.

== History ==
Prior to the establishment of the People's Republic of China, most Han towns and cities in Yunnan contained Dongjing associations, exclusive religious societies oriented around worship of the Taoist deity Wenchang Wang. The term Dongjing is an abbreviation of the title of the Taoist scripture Dadong Xianjing (大洞仙經), or "Immortals' Book of the Great Grotto". The Dongjing associations also performed highly regarded music during their ceremonies. The most prominent Dongjing associations were located in Dayan, Baisha, Shuhe, and Lhasa.

From 1949 to 1978, the Dongjing associations were suppressed under Communist rule. In the 1980s, when this grip was loosened, there was a major revival of dongjing music.

== Performance ==
Unlike most Naxi music, dongjing uses Chinese titles, Chinese instruments, heterophonic sizhu style, and Chinese gongche notation. Often, the orchestra will include the wooden fish (muyu), the pipa, sugudu, and sanxian lutes, the reed pipe, and the guqin and guzheng zithers.

In the pre-1949 rituals, participants had to be male, virtuous and honorable (usually this meant that membership was hereditary), and they had to donate to the association. Because of these requirements, and as evidenced by the Sinicized repertoire, performances and rituals could be seen as asserting the Dongjing members' elite status within the Naxi community. Semiannual sacrifices were made to Confucius, and biannual rituals were performed for Wenchang and Guan Yu.

== See also ==
- Baisha xiyue
