= Baisha xiyue =

Chinese music genre

Baisha xiyue (Chinese: 白沙细乐, literally "Baisha fine music") is one of the two surviving forms of traditional music of the Nakhi people of Lijiang, Yunnan Province, China, known as "Nakhi ancient music". Baisha is a town located 10 kilometres north of Lijiang, and was the capital of the independent Nakhi kingdom before it was annexed in 1271 by the Yuan Empire.

Baisha xiyue is a classical orchestral musical form, with 24 qupai (tunes), played on antique Chinese musical instruments, such as flute, shawm, Chinese lute, and zither. It is derived from the ritual music of Taoist and Confucian ceremonies from the 14th century. Since Lijiang is relatively remote, the music form has survived relatively unchanged since that period. The music is characterised by the "three olds" – old melodies, old instruments and old musicians.

The other surviving form of Nakhi ancient music is the Han derived dongjing yinyue ("cave scripture music"), which has its roots in Taoist and Buddhist ritual music. A third form of Nakhi ancient music, huangjing yinyue, has not survived. Traditional Nakhi music has been described as the living fossil of Chinese music.
