= Paiban =

Clapper used in Chinese music

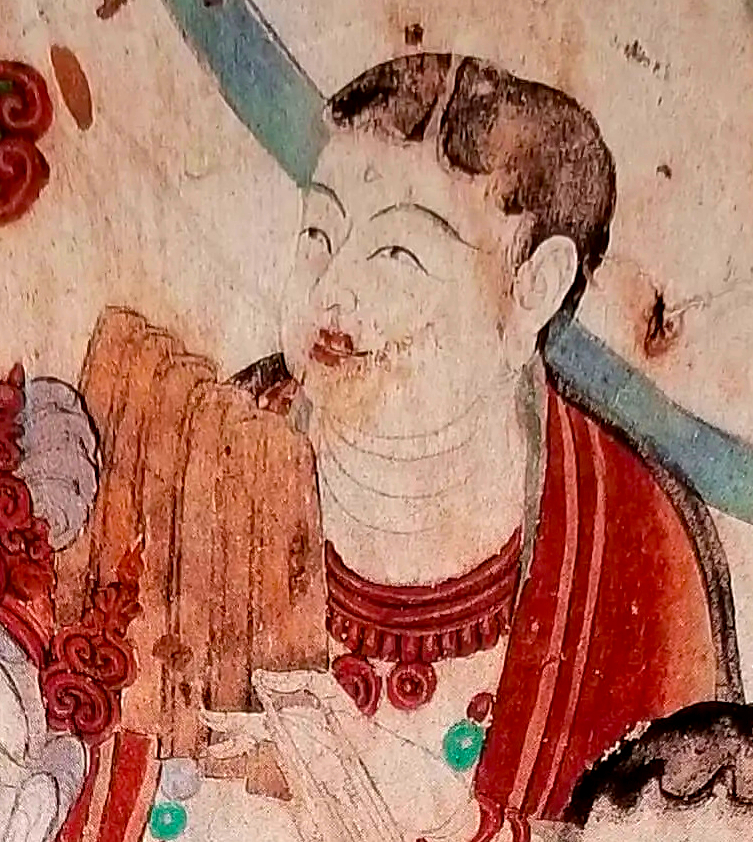
Painting of a musician playing a paiban. Mogao Caves, cave 159, paiban

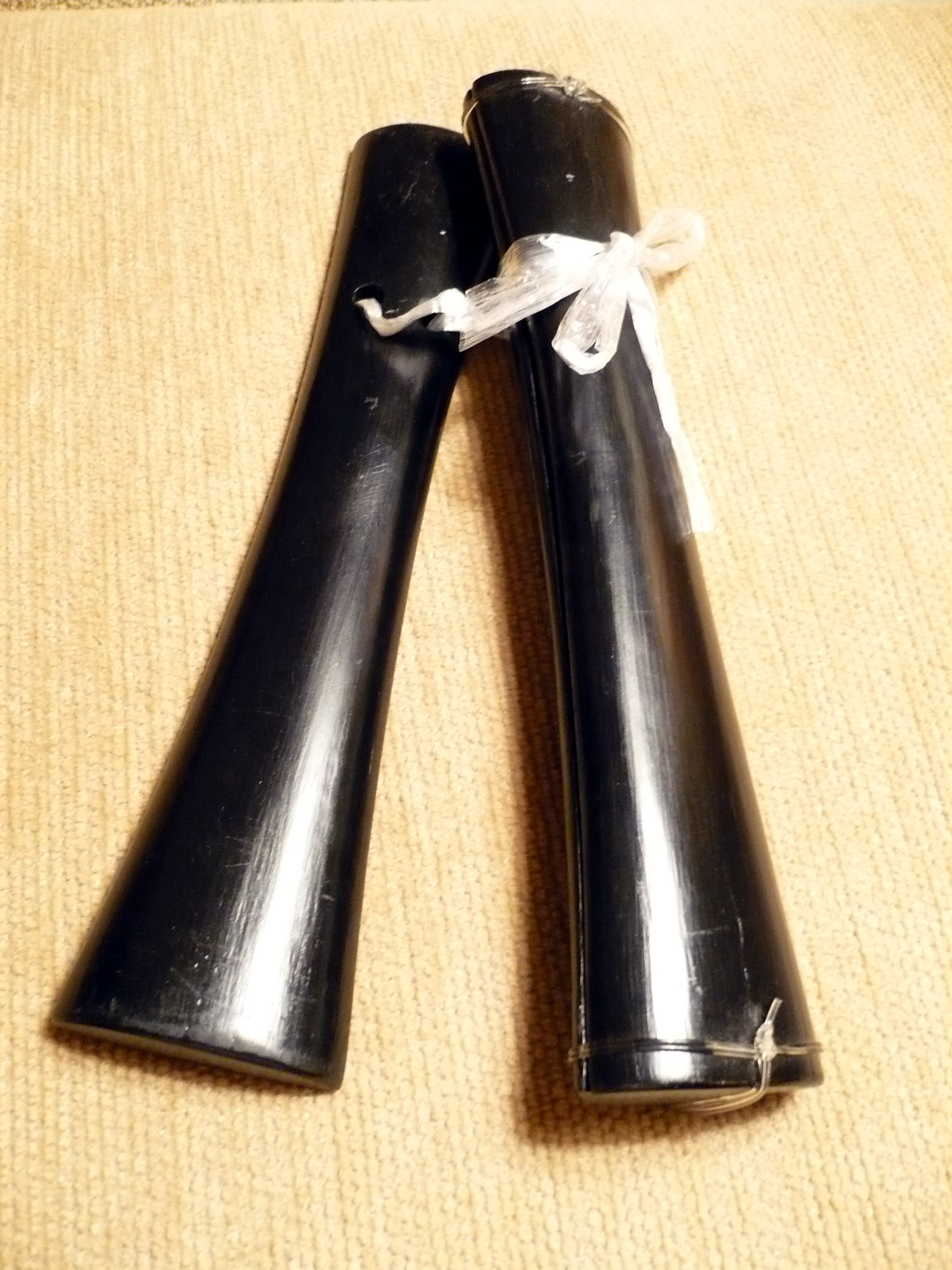
A paiban used in Chaozhou music

The paiban (Chinese: 拍板; pinyin: pāibǎn) is a clapper made from several flat pieces of hardwood or bamboo (or, formerly, sometimes also ivory or metal), which is used in many different forms of Chinese music. There are many different types of paiban, and the instrument is also referred to as bǎn (板), tánbǎn (檀板; 'sandalwood clapper'), mùbǎn (木板; 'wooden clapper'), or shūbǎn (书板). Typical materials used for the paiban include zitan (紫檀; 'rosewood or red sandalwood'), hongmu (红木), or hualimu (花梨木; 'rosewood'), or bamboo, with the slats tied together loosely on one end with cord. It is held vertically by one hand and clapped together, producing a sharp clacking sound.

When used together with a small drum (both played together by a single player, the paiban held in one hand and the drum played with a stick held in the other) the two instruments are referred to collectively as guban (鼓板). Somewhat confusingly, the clapper is sometimes also referred to, without the drum, as guban.

When used as part of a guban, the paiban is used in several genres of shuochang (Chinese story-singing), as well as in Beijing opera, kunqu, and Yue opera. It is also used in instrumental music, such as Jiangnan sizhu, Chaozhou xianshi, Sunan chuida (苏南吹打), nanguan, shifan luogu (十番锣鼓), and Shanxi batao (山西八套).
