= Jiangnan sizhu =

Chinese instrumental music style

Jiangnan sizhu (Wu Chinese pronunciation: [koŋ nø sɨ d̥zoʔ]) is a style of traditional Chinese instrumental music from the Jiangnan region of China.

== Name ==
The name Jiangnan sizhu (simplified Chinese: 江南丝竹; traditional Chinese: 江南絲竹; pinyin: Jiāngnán sīzhú) is made up of two parts. Jiangnan is the traditional name for the area south of the lower reaches of the Yangtze river in southern Jiangsu, Shanghai, and northern Zhejiang. Sizhu, literally "silk and bamboo", refers to string and wind musical instruments, silk being the traditional material from which strings have historically been made in China, and bamboo being the material from which the Chinese flutes such as the dizi and xiao are made. The term sizhu by extension also came to refer to instrumental music in general, especially that played indoors. Other sizhu traditions also exist, particularly along China's southeastern coastal regions of Fujian and Guangdong.

== History ==
Sizhu is a 20th-century term that refers to the folk ensembles that first appeared in the Ming (1368–1644) and Qing (1644–1911/12) dynasties and have continued to the present day. Many regional variants exist, but the most influential has been the Jiangnan sizhu, which in the 19th century became established south of the Yangtze River, especially in the cities of southeast Jiangsu and northern Zhejiang provinces. By the early part of the 20th century, Shanghai had become the centre of sizhu activities; the city's elite organized numerous amateur clubs that played for social functions and for their own entertainment. The Shanghai sizhu became the basis of the modern Chinese orchestra in the mid-20th century.

== Instruments ==
Instruments typically used in Jiangnan sizhu include plucked, bowed, strummed and struck string instruments; flutes and sometimes also mouth organs; and small percussion instruments. The most commonly used instruments are:

- Dizi – transverse bamboo flute, most commonly with traditional equal distant finger holes which does not produce an equal temperament, although the equal-tempered dizi is standard with professionals
- Xiao – end-blown bamboo flute, as with the dizi, equal distant finger holes are preferred with the equal-tempered type standard with professionals
- Erhu – two-string vertical fiddle, standard erhu D4, A4 tuning. A second erhu is sometimes used, known as fanhu (反胡) or fan erhu (反二胡), meaning "counter fiddle" or "cross fiddle"; it has thicker strings tuned a minor third (B3, F4#) or fourth (A3, E4) below the leading erhu
- Pipa – pear-shaped lute with four strings, uses standard tuning of A2, D3, E3, A3. Although G2, C3, D3, G3, a whole tone lower, is sometimes used, with other string instruments also tuned a tone lower
- Yangqin – hammered dulcimer, smaller than the large professional solo type, has range of two octaves and a fifth; D3 to A5
- Sheng – free-reed mouth organ, most commonly with 17 pipes
- Sanxian – plucked lute with three strings, the small "southern" type is used, tuned to D3, A3, D4.
- Qinqin – plucked lute, tuned to D3, A3, (optional 3rd string is tuned to D3)
- Guban – Wooden clapper (paiban) and small drum (biqigu, diangu, or huaigu)

Several other instruments sometimes are also used:

- Zhonghu – two-string fiddle, larger and lower pitched than the erhu
- Ruan – plucked lute with four strings
- Liuqin – small plucked lute with four strings
- Guzheng – plucked zither with movable bridges
- Pengling – a pair of small bells

As in an Irish traditional music session, the instrumentation is not fixed, and so may vary according to the musicians who are available for a particular performance. Usually only one of each instrument is used, and an ensemble can range from as few as two to as many as ten or more musicians, with the erhu, dizi or xiao, pipa, and yangqin being the core instruments. Players may sometimes switch instruments between pieces.

== Repertoire ==
=== Eight Great Pieces ===
At the centre of the repertory are the Eight Great Pieces (八大曲; Ba Da Qu) or Eight Great Famous Pieces (八大名曲; Ba Da Mingqu,):

1. Huā Sān Liù (花三六; "Ornamented 'Three Six")
2. Huān Lè Gē (欢乐歌; "Song of Joy")
3. Màn Liù Bǎn (慢六板; "Slow 'Six Beats")
4. Sān Liù (三六; "Three Six")
5. Sì Hé Rú Yì (四合如意; "Four Together as You Wish")
6. Xíng Jiē (行街; "Walking in the Street", "Wedding Procession," or "Street Procession")
7. Yún Qìng (云庆; "Cloud Celebration")
8. Zhōng Huā Liù Bǎn (中花六板; "Moderately Ornamented 'Six Beats"); also called Xūn Fēng Qǔ (薰风曲; "Warm Breeze Tune")

The repertoire is based on old melodies such as Lao Liu Ban ("Old Six Beats"), also called Lao Ba Ban ("Old Eight Beats"). These were elaborated to create new pieces such as Zhong Hua Liu Ban ("Moderately Ornamented Six Beats"), the latter of which is the most important piece of all the pieces derived from "Lao Liu Ban".

=== Other pieces ===
These are other pieces that are played by Jiangnan sizhu music clubs. It includes pieces that were originally instrumental solos, music from narrative genres, and sizhu pieces from Jiangnan and other areas.

- Zhong Liu Ban, also called Hua Liu Ban (花六板)
- Kuai Hua Liu Ban (快花六板)
- Kuai Liu Ban (快六板); also called Kuai Hua Liu (快花六)
- Lao Liu Ban (老六板)
- Man San Liu (慢三六)
- Chūn Jiāng Huā Yuè Yè (春江花月夜; "Spring River Flower Moon Night") adapted from an ancient pipa solo in 1925 by the Datong Music Club.
- Dēng Yuè Jiāo Huī (灯月交辉; "Lanterns and Moon Exchanging in Brilliance"), ensemble piece from the Jiangnan area (Hangzhou)
- Hán Jiāng Cán Xuě (寒江残雪; "Cold River and Remnants of Snow")
- Huái Gǔ (怀古; "Thinking of the Past"), originally from Fujian Hakka (Kejia) music.
- Ní Cháng Qǔ (霓裳曲; "Rainbow Skirts"), ensemble piece from the Jiangnan area, said to be from Hangzhou
- Xù Huā Luò (絮花落; "Catkin Flowers Falling"), derived from Lao Liu Ban.
- Yáng Bā Qǔ (阳八曲; "Yang Eight Tune"), also called Fàn Wáng Gōng (凡忘工 / 梵王宫; "Fa as Mi") or Fàn Huáng Gōng (梵皇宫), ensemble piece from the Jiangnan area. The last fast section was arranged by Nie Er into the piece "Dance of the Golden Snake."
- Zhè Gū Fēi (鹧鸪飞; "Flying Partridge"), from Hunan, commonly played as a dizi or xiao solo.

New Jiangnan sizhu compositions include:

- Chūn Huī Qǔ (春晖曲; "Spring Sun")
- Hǎo Jiāngnán (好江南; "Good Jiangnan")

== Social context ==
Jiangnan sizhu is generally considered to be a folk tradition rather than a professional one, and is most often performed by amateurs. It is typically performed in informal gatherings, often at tea houses. By the mid-20th century, it had also entered the curriculum of China's conservatories, where it continues to be performed by large ensembles of traditional instruments in fully scored arrangements.

== Notable musicians ==
In the second half of the 20th century, a quartet from China playing Jiangnan sizhu repertoire as well as newly composed pieces comprised four men: dizi player Lu Chunling (1921–2018), pipa player Ma Shenglong (马圣龙, 1934–2003), yangqin player Zhou Hui (周惠, 1922–2011), and erhu player Zhou Hao (周皓, 1929–2023). They brought the style to new audiences and performed together for many years.

== Related genres ==
Shanghai opera, which was developed in the mid-20th century, has a musical style and accompaniment that is closely related to Jiangnan sizhu.

== Reference and further reading ==
- Thrasher, Alan Robert (2008). Sizhu Instrumental Music of South China: Ethos, Theory and Practice. Brill. ISBN 9789004165007.
- Jones, Stephen (1995). Folk Music of China. Oxford: Clarendon Press OUP.
- Witzleben, J. Lawrence (1995). "Silk and Bamboo" Music in Shanghai: The Jiangnan Sizhu Instrumental Ensemble Tradition. Kent, Ohio: The Kent State University Press
