= Bangzi =

Bangzi (梆子), also known as Bangzi opera and Clapper opera, may refer to several closely related Chinese opera genres:

- Henan opera, from Henan
- Hebei bangzi, from Hebei
- Qinqiang, from Shaanxi
- Shanxi opera, from Shanxi

== See also ==
- Four Great Characteristic Melodies
