= Nakhi people =

Ethnic group in Southwestern China

Nakhi Nashi, Naxi
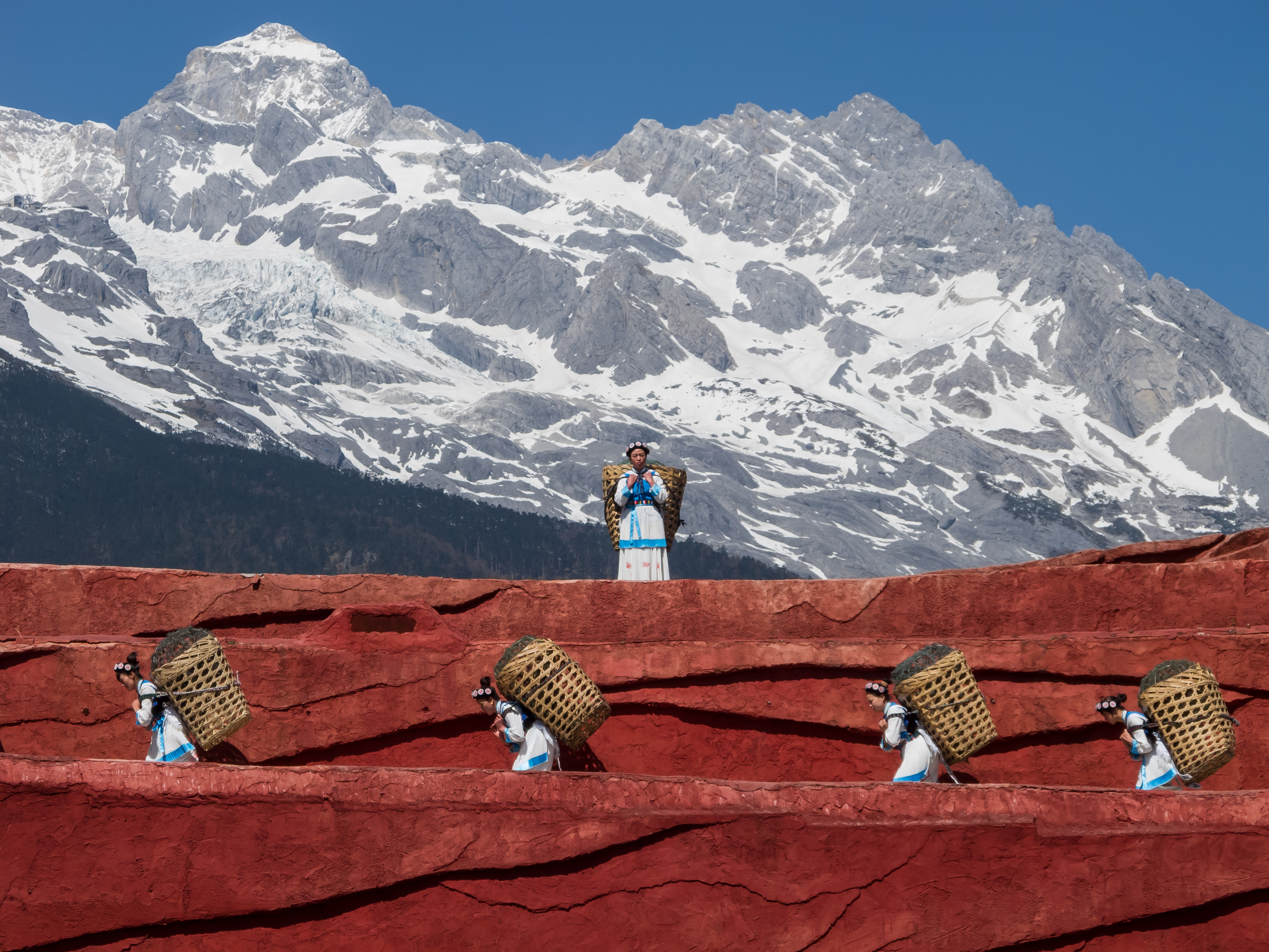
- Nakhi people in a staged basket-carrying performance

Total population
- 323,767 (2020 census)

Regions with significant populations
- China (Sichuan, Yunnan)

Languages
- Nakhi

Religion
- Dongba, Tibetan Buddhism, Taoism

Related ethnic groups
- Mosuo

The Nakhi, Nashi, or Naxi (simplified Chinese: 纳西族; traditional Chinese: 納西族; pinyin: Nàxī zú; Naxi: Naqxi) are a people inhabiting the Hengduan Mountains abutting the Eastern Himalayas in the northwestern part of Yunnan Province, as well as the southwestern part of Sichuan Province in China.

The Nakhi are thought to have come originally from northwestern China, migrating south toward Tibetan-populated regions, and usually inhabiting the most fertile riverside land, driving the other competing tribes farther up the hillsides onto less fertile land. The Nakhi traded over the dangerous overland trading links with Lhasa and India, on the so-called tea and horse caravan routes.

The Nakhi form one of the 56 ethnic groups officially recognized by the People's Republic of China. The official Chinese government classification includes the Mosuo as part of the Nakhi people.

Nakhi culture is largely its own native Dongba religious, literary, and farming practices, influenced by the Confucian roots of Han Chinese history. Especially in the case of their musical scores, it acts as the foundation of the Nakhi literature. The Nakhi have their own writing, their own distinct language and their own native dress.

== Art and architecture ==
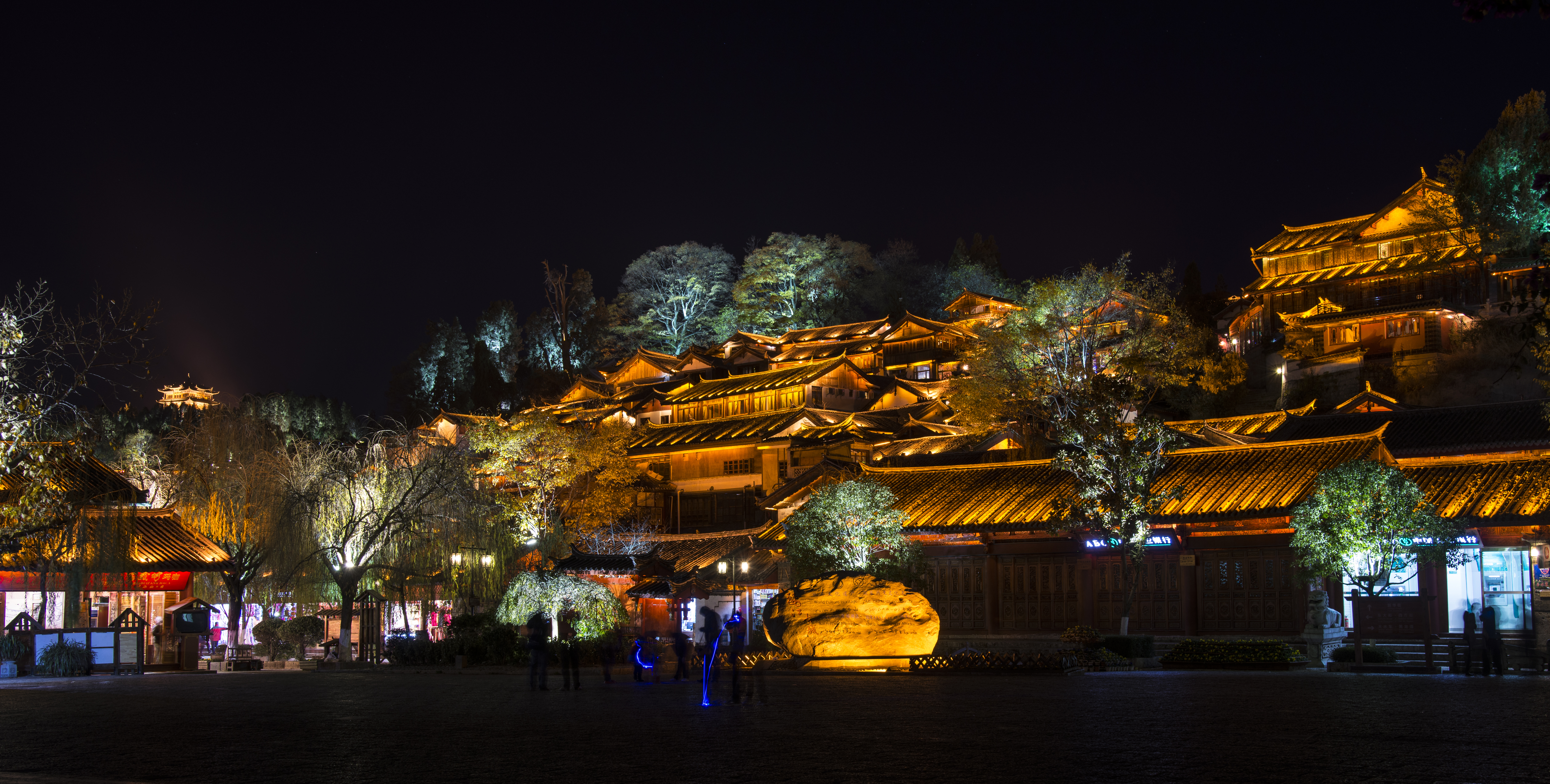
Lijiang old town at night

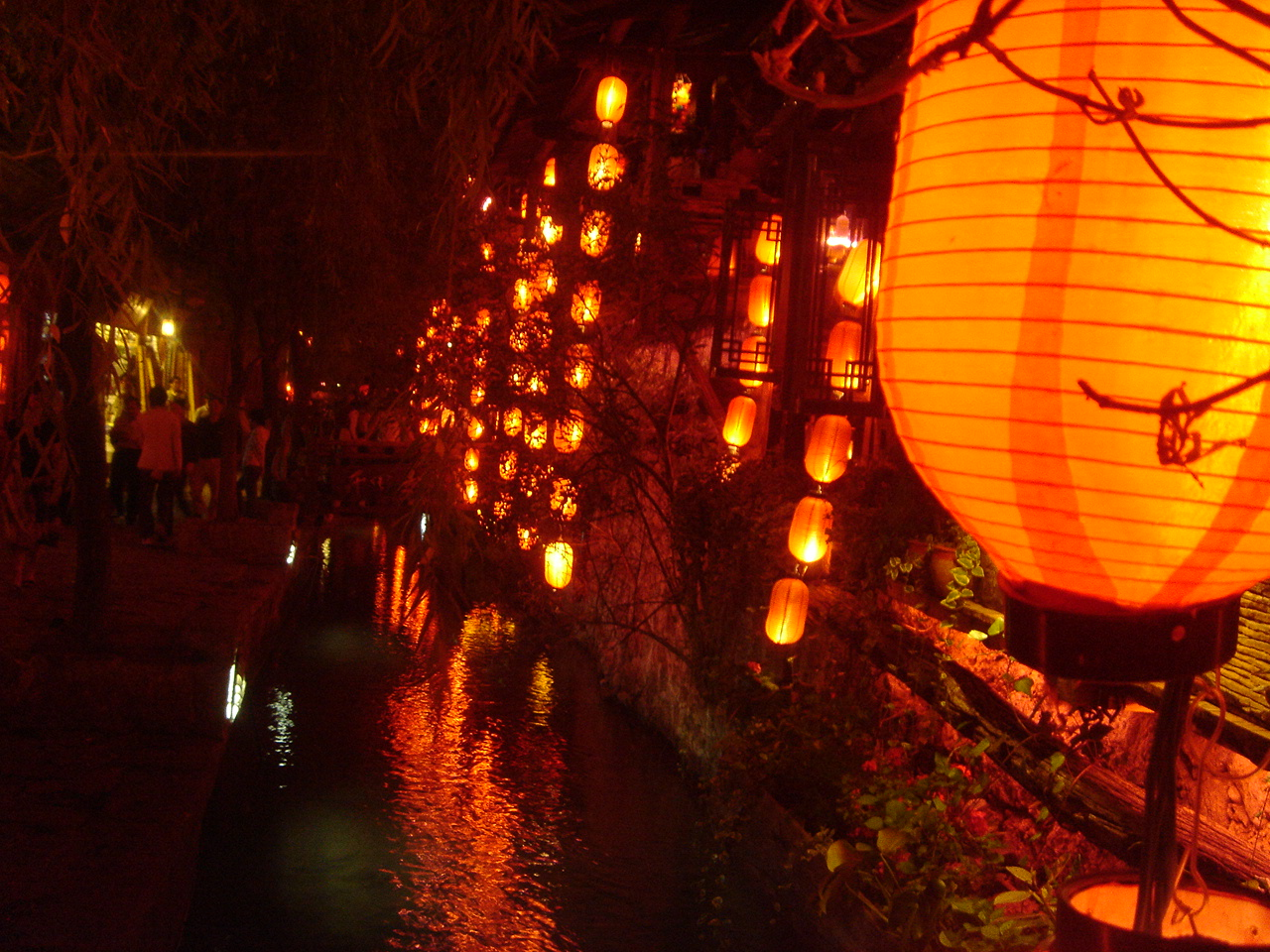
A Lijiang street at night

There are many arts that are native to the Nakhi people, such as the rarely seen Nakhi handmade embroidery, Dongba painting, Dongba wooden carving and so on. Much of the wood carving that characterizes Nakhi houses are made by Bai craftsmen today. Absorbing architectural styles of the Han, Nakhi houses are built in a standard Han style of one courtyard with one to four buildings around it, sometimes with linked adjoining courtyards. The mud brick and wood structures have been described at first sight as crude and simple in appearance, but a closer inspection reveals elaborate and delicate patterns on casements and doors, elegant pillars and pillar supports, and a very comfortable and airy living environment.

Nakhi temples are decorated on the interior with carvings on poles, arches and wall paintings that often exhibit a unique combination of Dongba and Buddhist influences. The decorations include depictions of episodes from epics, dancers, warriors, animals and birds, and flowers. The mural paintings depict Dongba gods, and stylistically are derived from Han Chinese interpretations of Tibetan Buddhist themes. A good example is the Delwada Temple.

"There are strong arguments that support the idea that in the past the main ritual activity performed on a temporal basis was the worship of Shu nature spirits on the first days (usually on a dragon or snake day) of the second lunar month, and that this was the traditional New Year of the Nakhi. In Baidi, where the old traditions have been preserved, this is the most important festival, when everybody dressed in their best clothes, gathers around the Baishuitai terrace in a festive atmosphere and pay respect to the Shu gods of nature." ... "Around the same time when the Shu Nature spirits are worshiped in Baidi, the people gather to honour Sanduo in Baisha and Lijiang."... "Worship of Heaven ceremony, celebrated some days before Worshiping Shu, is a ritual celebration to remember that Nakhi ancestors came from Heaven, and that therefore they descend also from a celestial lineage." The New Year is nowadays the main festival for the Nakhi of Lijiang. the New Year is considered a time of renovation for humans, their houses and their fields, a time of spiritual and physical rebirth when every person must be born again, clean and uncontaminated from the hard existence of the previous year (Ceinos 2012).

The Nakhi celebrate the annual Torch Festival on the 24th and 25th of the sixth month of the Lunar calendar, which corresponds approximately to July 8–9, and the Sanduo Festival on February 8.

According to legend, Sanduo is a war god who defends the local people. In ancient times, a hunter discovered a strange stone on Jade Dragon Mountain, and carried the stone home. On his way home, he had to put the stone down for a rest, because it was extremely heavy. When he decided to continue his trip, he could no longer lift the stone, and many thought that it was the embodiment of a god. The Nakhi later built a temple to honour this god, whom they later named Sanduo, and depicted as an immortal in a white coat and a white helmet, carrying a white spear and riding a white horse. They believed that Sanduo would protect the local people and their land. Because Sanduo was thought to have been born in the year of the Goat, it is sacrificed at his festival.

== Clothing ==
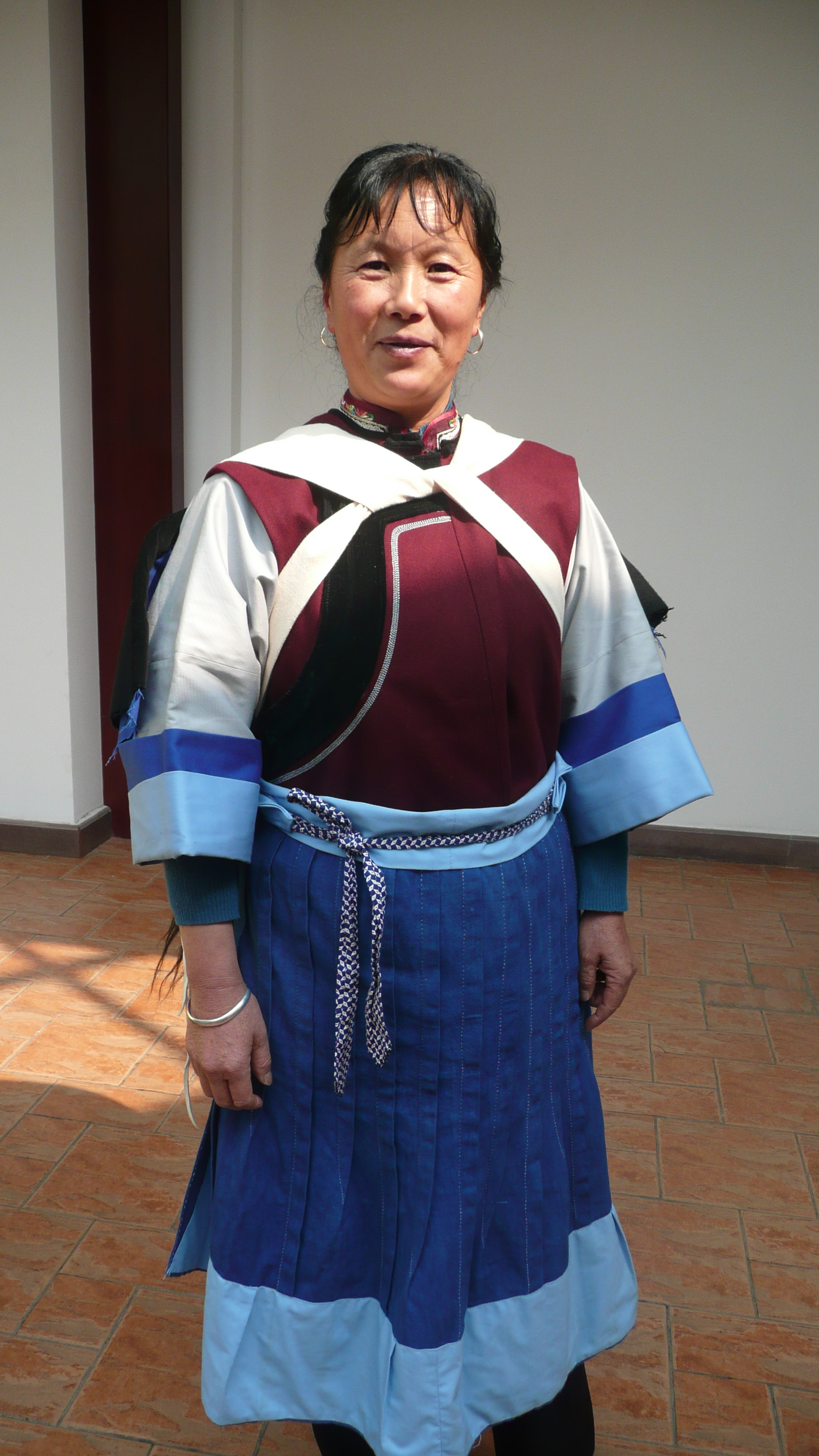
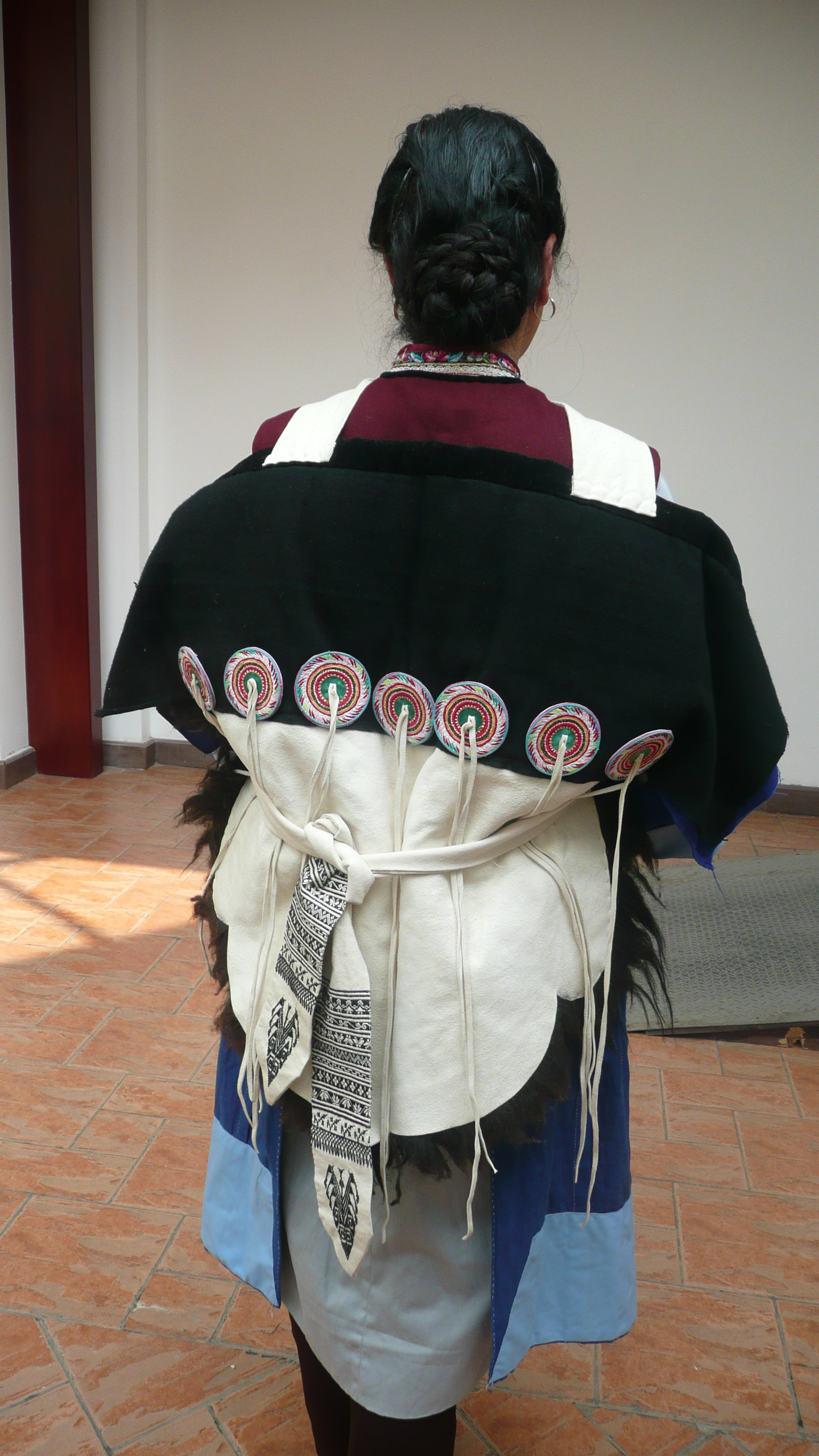
A Nakhi woman in traditional clothing

The Nakhi women wear wide-sleeved loose gowns accompanied by jackets and long trousers, tied with richly decorated belts at the waist. Sheepskin is worn over the shoulder. Especially in Ninglang County, the women wear short jackets and long skirts reaching the ground with several folds. Large black cotton turbans are worn around their heads, which are accompanied with big silver earrings. The men's costume is much like that of Han Chinese. In modern times, traditional dress is rarely worn among the younger generation. It is now usually only worn at cultural events and on special occasions.

== Language ==
The language is written with Geba script and Dongba script.

== Music ==
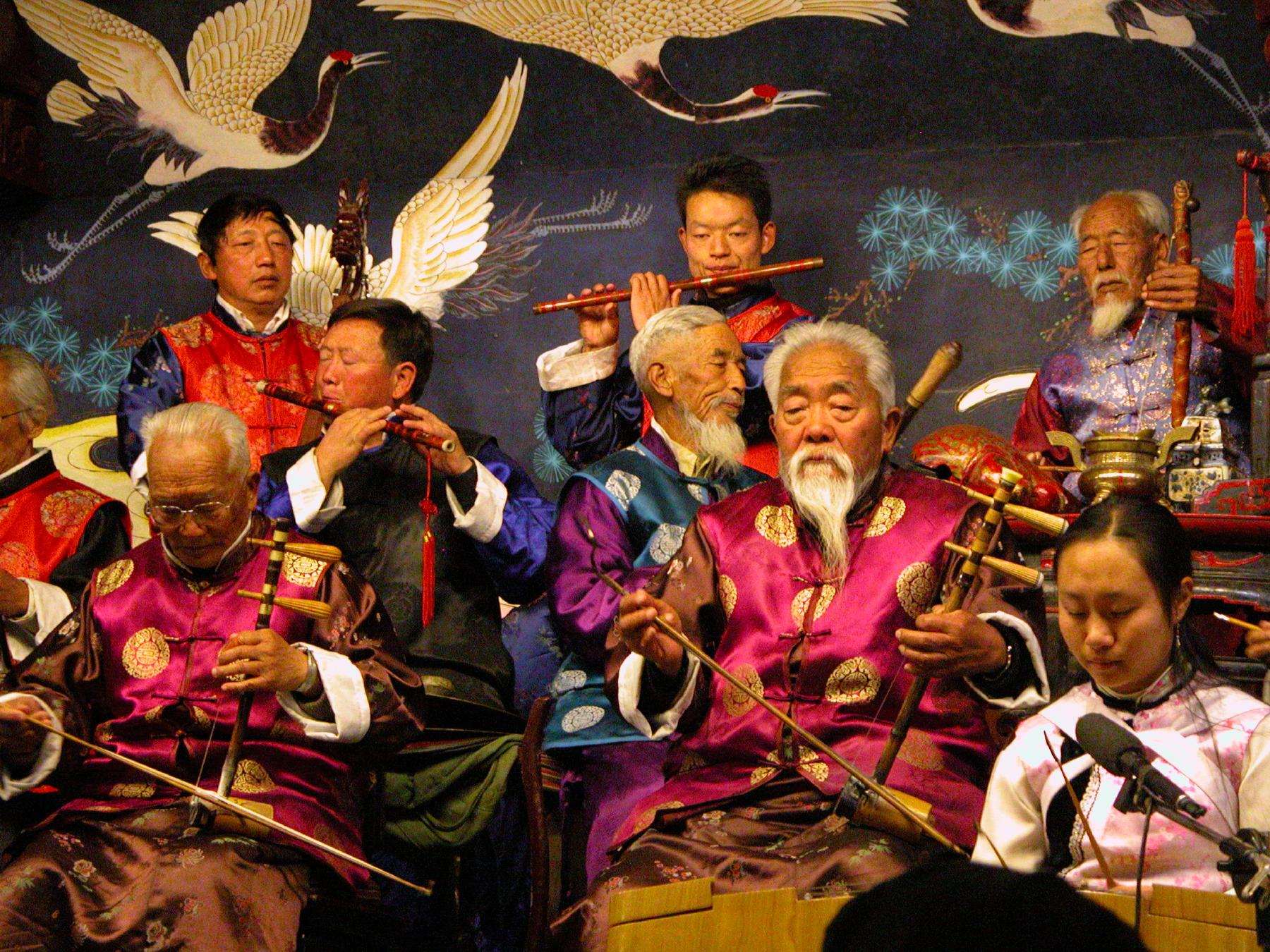
Nakhi dongjing musicians in Lijiang

The Nakhi have several indigenous forms of music, including baisha xiyue and the Chinese-inspired dongjing discussed above.

== Society ==
Nakhi from the northern region, Yongning (永宁), recognized at the provincial level as a separate group, the Na (Mosuo), are known to be matrilineal and matrilocal, i.e. parentage is by the mother and all children – men and women – live in the house of the mother, from birth until death. Their family system is different from the one we know in the West since marriage – that is to say the recognition of a union of individuals by an institution – does not exist. The practice of sexual life is free between non-consanguineous adults: at night, the man goes to the woman with whom he would like to have sex, the woman being free to accept or not. Both men and women are free to have multiple partners. As a result, children do not always know their biological father. The children are raised by the inhabitants of the household, the maternal uncles assuming the role of "father" as understood in the West. This conception stems in part from one of their beliefs presenting the man as the rain on the grass: it serves to foster what is already there. The reproductive role of the man is thus to "water" the fetus already present in the woman. For Nakhi, hereditary characters are contained in bones, and are transmitted by women. However, with the opening to tourism and the exile of some inhabitants, manners tend to change, some Na (Mosuo) people conforming to the monogamous couple.

These practices, which are still observable in the 21st century among the Na, are no longer practiced among the Naxi since the implementation of Confucian practices decided by the lords of Lijiang.

== Traditions ==
Cremation has been a tradition since ancient times, although burial was adopted in most Nakhi areas during the late Qing Dynasty and remains the preferred method of disposing of the dead today. Religious scriptures are chanted at the funeral ceremony to expiate the sins of the dead.

Among the Nakhi in Yongning County in Yunnan and the Yanyuan County in Sichuan, there still exist remnants of the Mosuo matrilineal family structure, which was vigorously but unsuccessfully eradicated during the Communist era.

As the heads of the family, a woman leaves her inheritance to her descendants either from the mother, or through her sisters and their offspring.

In Nakhi society, women do most of the household and farm work, and while they keep to the kitchen when guests are present, they are essential to the household and are therefore influential in family decisions.

A few Nakhi men carry on the ancient Chinese tradition of hunting with falcons. This practice is rarely found in other parts of China today.

== History ==
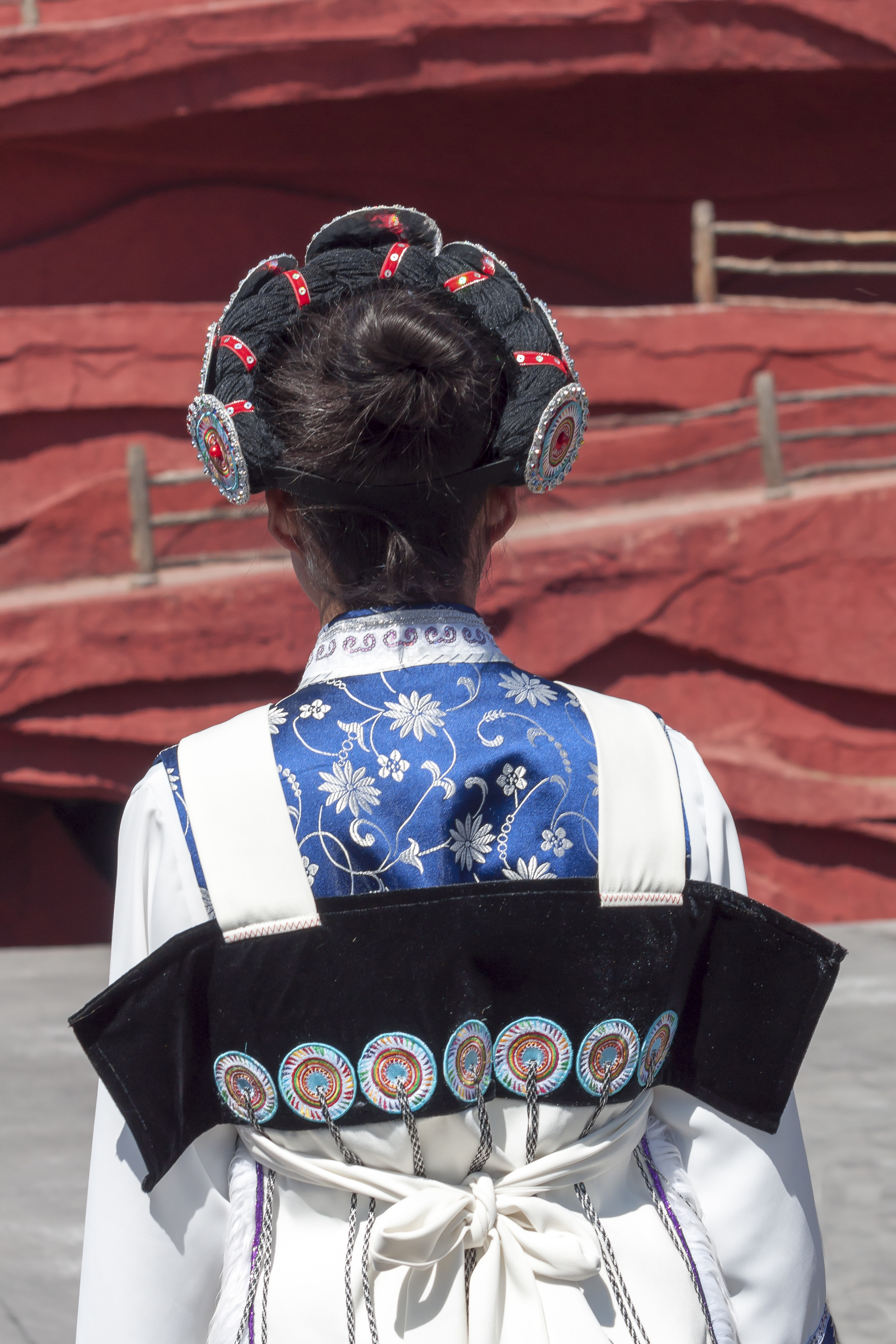
A Nakhi woman in traditional dress

The Nakhi, like Mosuo, are believed to be the descendants of the nomadic proto-Qiang.

Frequently harassed by neighboring tribes, the proto-Nakhi then moved southward to the banks of the Nujiang River and the Jinsha River and then to the Along River in the present-day province of Sichuan in western China. After being pushed south by other conquering tribes, the Nashi settled in the very fertile Baisha and Lijiang areas by the year 3 CE.

Nakhi histories describe a split into three groups while their ancestors were still in Baisha. The ones who remained are known as the Nashi, those in Dali are known as Bai, and those living around the Lugu Lake are called the Mosuo. Today, this description of the origins of the Bai and Mosuo is strenuously contested.

Historians have decided that between the tenth and thirteenth centuries, agricultural production in Lijiang replaced livestock breeding as the main occupation of the people. The production of agricultural, handicraft, mineral, and livestock products led to considerable prosperity, and during this period a number of slave-owning groups in Ninglang, Lijiang, and Weixi counties developed into a feudal caste of lords. Tibetan Buddhism took hold in the Lijiang region following visits from the Karmapas from the fourteenth century onwards.

In 1278, the Yuan dynasty established the Lijiang Prefecture, which represented the imperial court in Yunnan. A chieftain, Mude, was made the hereditary chieftain of Lijiang Prefecture, exercising control over the Nakhi people and other ethnic groups (particularly the Eastern Tibetans inhabiting the region of Kham) during the Ming dynasty. The hereditary chieftains from the Mu family collected taxes and tribute, which then went to the Ming court in the form of silver and grains. The Ming relied on the Mu family as the mainstay for the control of the people of various ethnic groups in northwestern Yunnan Province.

In 1723, during the Qing dynasty, hereditary local chieftains in the Lijiang area were replaced by court officials, and the Mu chieftains were included in this group retaining position as local administrators.

The ancient Nakhi town of Lijiang is now a major tourist destination. In the old town, the Nakhi rent buildings to Han merchants who run shops catering to tourists.

In 2005, Kuang Jianren, a famous Chinese film script writer produced "Snow Bracelet", a film based on the life of Nakhi ethnic minorities in Yunnan.

== Religion ==
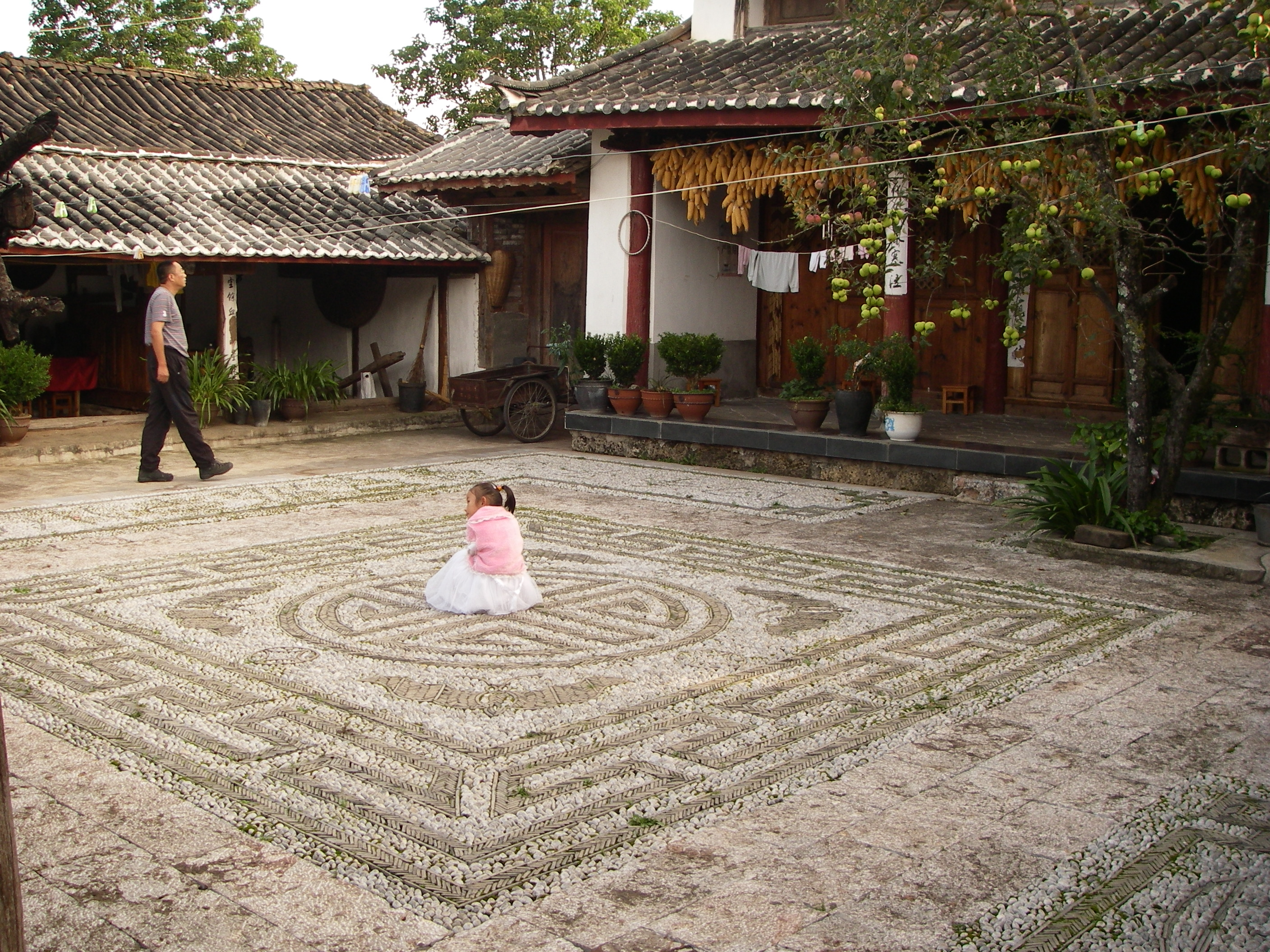
An old guest-house in Lijiang, built around the beginning of the 20th century. The motifs and scripts made by pebble mosaic represent ancient Nashi beliefs in symbols and writing.

The Nakhi are traditionally led by their native Dongbas in matters pertaining to religion. Through both Han Chinese and other cultural influences, Tibetan Buddhism has gained widespread respect (especially in the case of the Mosuo). Taoism, and particularly its "fengshui" practices have been widely practiced since the tenth century.

=== Dongba ===
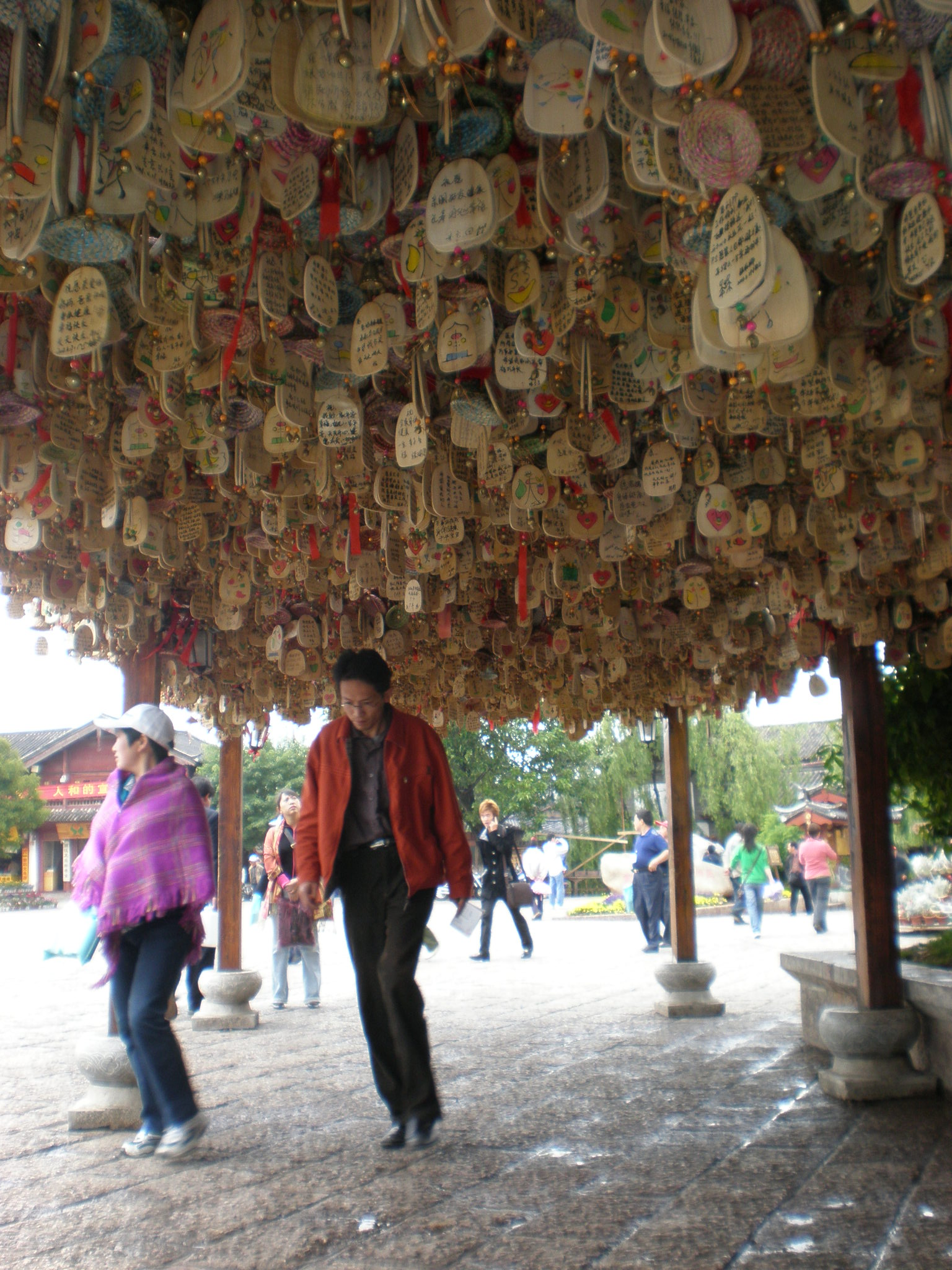
Dongba aspiration windbells in Yuhe Square

Dongba religion is rooted in the beliefs of the Tibetan Bön religion; the word "Dongba" literally means "wise man" in the Nakhi language. Nakhi legend traces Dongba's origins to a Bön shaman from eastern Tibet named Ton-pa Shen-rab (丁巴什罗), who lived in a cave near Baishuitai during the 12th century.

Anthropologists claim that many of the Dongba rituals show strong influences from the Bön religion, and are not native in origin. Bön lamas are believed to have settled among the Nashi as farmers, and to have begun to practice exorcisms as a way of earning a little money on the side; they were thus in competition with the native ritual specialists, locally known as Llü-bu, or Ssan-nyi. This is disputed, largely because the Bon religion has been influenced by Tibetan Buddhism and it is difficult to find traditional practitioners to use as a basis for comparison.

Religious scriptures suggest that the Llü-bu were female shamans who practiced divination, exorcism, and other rites in a trance. By the early nineteenth century, the Dongba priests had created a huge religious vocabulary accompanied by a variety of rituals, and had largely displaced the Llü-bu. This is certainly the case with Yi shamans, but the connection to Dongba practices remains unclear.

Adherents of Dongba had no places of worship, and so they were not officially recognized as a religion by the Communists following their arrival to the region. A Dongba shaman is merely a part-time practitioner priest, who is literate in Dongba religious texts that were unreadable by most Nashi, who are not usually taught to read their own language.

The Dongba religion is based on the relationship between nature and man. In Dongba mythology, "Nature" and "Man" are half-brothers, having different mothers. According to the villagers of Shu Ming Village, nature is controlled by spirits called "Shv". These gods are depicted as human-snake chimeras. The Dongba priests practice rituals such as the "Shv Gu" to appease these spirits and prevent their anger from boiling into natural disasters such as earthquakes and droughts.

Before communist rule in China, many villages still had shrines or places of worship dedicated to nature gods, such as Shu. Nakhi inhabitants of Tacheng, which is in the Lijiang-Nakhi Autonomous county, still profess belief in the "nature and man" relationship.

Their attitude towards nature is clearly illustrated by the story of He Shun, a Dongba priest, who forbade his three sons to cut down more trees than they personally needed, as this would anger the gods and bring misfortune to his family.

One of the most widely practised Dongba rituals, Zzerq Ciul Zhuaq (literally, to repay the debts of a tree), has been described in the village of Shuming. The ritual was conducted if somebody was stricken with illness or bad luck, when a Dongba priest would be consulted. On many occasions, the result would show that the person had carried out logging or washing of dirty things in the forest, and the family or person concerned would have to ask the Dongba priest to hold the ritual near where the activity had taken place, and apologize to the nature god Shu.

Being a conservative people, the villagers prohibited logging, and even the cutting of tree branches and gathering of dry pine-needles from the coniferous trees was not generally allowed. The gathering of pine needles was only allowed in July, when the forests were lush and green. However, only one person from each household was allowed to do this job, in order to enforce fairness between households with more or fewer laborers. (Dry pine needles are mixed with pig manure for fertilizer. Green pine needles are used as a ground covering in courtyards during celebrations.)

The elders, locally known as Lao Min (老民), would watch all these activities. The elders also voluntarily carried out the public affairs of the village. Traditionally, they played an important role, which still influences many villages.

Especially in Longquan, the villagers have traditional regulations for logging and firewood collection. Known as Jjuq-ssaiq or Jjuq-Hal-Keel by the local people, this refers to the regular logging of trees and firewood every two to three years in the forested area near the particular village. A group of people comprising the Lao Min, the village headman, and the mountain guards will organize the procedure in advance. Even in recent years, Nakhi villages still retain an organization that protects the forests. This organization is administered by the members of the village committee, which necessarily includes the heads of the agricultural Productive Cooperatives, the members of the female union, and the village mountain guard.

Until the communists came to power in China in 1949, villagers followed these traditional principles and tried to use the natural resources conservatively, with thought for the preservation of the natural resources for future generations. However, after 1949 serious cultural and social change came to the Nakhi, and the government encouraged logging by the Han army in Nakhi areas, which in turn led to a loss of influence of the traditional customs.

=== Tibetan Buddhism ===
Many of the Nakhi embrace the Kagyu lineage of Tibetan Buddhism, resulting from the presence of the eighth and the tenth Karmapas in the Lijiang area during the fourteenth century. Over the years, the Nakhi in Lijiang built Buddhist Gompas, which acted as the place of worship for the Nakhi Buddhist community. The first monastery, Ogmin Namling at Lashiba, was founded by the tenth Karmapa, Chöying Dorje. Religious Mani stones can also be found in some of the Nakhi households.

The Nakhi king invited the eighth Karmapa, Mikyö Dorje to Lijiang in 1516. The king, worried about the safety of the Karmapa on his long journey to Lijiang, dispatched an army of four generals and ten thousand soldiers to accompany him. On the third day of the fourth month, the Karmapa reached the border between Tibet and the Nakhi kingdom. Accompanied by his brother and his uncle, who were both riding elephants and escorted by many riders on horseback, the Nakhi king, riding on a palanquin, received them with this magnificent welcome. The king prostrated himself before the Karmapa, the elephants broke their tethers and bowed down three times before him, and raised their trunks to the sky trumpeting loud as thunderclaps.

== Introduction to the West ==
They were brought to the attention of the Western world by two men: the American botanist Joseph Rock and the Russian traveler and writer Peter Goullart, both of whom lived in Lijiang and traveled throughout the area during the early 20th century. Peter Goullart's book Forgotten Kingdom describes the life and beliefs of the Nakhi and neighboring peoples, while Joseph Rock's legacy includes diaries, maps, and photographs of the region, many of which were published in National Geographic.

US TV series The Amazing Race 18 had also introduced the Nakhi people to its viewers whilst visiting Lijiang.
