= Gar (disambiguation) =

The gar is a North American freshwater fish of the family Lepisosteidae, distinct from the saltwater garfish.

Gar may also refer to:

== Places ==
- Gar, Fars, a village in Iran
- Gar, Sistan and Baluchestan, a village in Iran
- Shiquanhe, Tibet, a town also known as Gar
- Gar County, in Tibet, China

== GAR ==
- Glycineamide ribonucleotide
- Glutathione amide reductase, an enzyme
- Grand Army of the Republic, US Civil War veterans organization; also Grand Army of the Republic (disambiguation) lists other organizations with that name
- Garrison Hall, University of Texas at Austin
- Great American Recreation, the company owned and operated Action Park in New Jersey, US until 1996
- IOC code for artistic gymnastics at the Summer Olympics

== People ==
- Gar (name), a list of people with the given name, nickname or Tibetan clan name

== Other uses ==
- Gar (music), a Tibetan form of chanting
- Gar (spear), an Old English word meaning "spear"
- Tambor-class submarine, a US Navy class whose later members were sometimes attributed to the "Gar class"
  - USS Gar (SS-206), a World War II submarine
- Gardiner railway station, Melbourne
- Garfield "Gar" Logan, DC Comics superhero Beast Boy
- Galeya language of Papua New Guinea, ISO 639-3 code
- Gliese 486, a star with the proper name Gar

== See also ==
- Garr (disambiguation)
- Garre (disambiguation)
- Gars (disambiguation)
