= Army of the Republic =

Army of the Republic may refer to:

- Arm na Poblachta, Gaelic for "Army of the Republic", active dissident Irish republican paramilitary group
- Army of the Republic, alternative name of the British New Model Army (1645–1660)
- Army of the Republic, fictional army and aerospace force of clone troopers in the Star Wars franchise
- The Army of the Republic, novel by Stuart Archer Cohen.
- The army of the Roman Republic
- Grand Army of the Republic, US Civil War veterans' organization

== See also ==
- Grand Army of the Republic (disambiguation)
- Republican Army (disambiguation)
