= Garr =

Garr is a surname. Notable people with the surname include:

- Allen Garr, journalist, author, and journalism instructor based in Vancouver, British Columbia, Canada
- Artie Garr, a pseudonym used by American singer Art Garfunkel
- Dixie Garr (born 1956), African-American computer engineer
- Ralph Garr (born 1945), former Major League Baseball player
- Teri Garr (1944–2024), American actress
- Garr King (1936–2019), judge of the U.S. District Court for the District of Oregon

== In fiction ==
- Garr Kelvin, a character in the video game Tales of Destiny
- Garr (Breath of Fire), a character in the video game series Breath of Fire

== See also ==
- Georgia Radio Reading Service, or GARRS
- Gar (disambiguation)
- Garre (disambiguation)
- GARR (Gruppo per l'Armonizzazione delle Reti della Ricerca, i.e. Research Networks Armonization Group), the Italian national research and education network
