= Music of China =

The music of China consists of many distinct traditions, often specifically originating with one of the country's various ethnic groups. It is produced within the country, involving people of Chinese origin, the use of traditional Chinese instruments, Chinese music theory, or the languages of China. It includes traditional classical forms and indigenous folk music, as well as recorded popular music and forms inspired by Western culture.

Documents and archaeological artifacts from early Chinese civilization show a well-developed musical culture as early as the Zhou dynasty (1122–257 BC) that set the tone for the continual development of Chinese musicology in following dynasties. These developed into a wide variety of forms through succeeding dynasties, producing the heritage that is part of the Chinese cultural landscape today. Traditional forms continued to evolve in the modern times, and over the course of the last centuries forms appropriated from the West have become widespread. Today's Chinese music is both rooted in history and part of a global culture.

== History ==
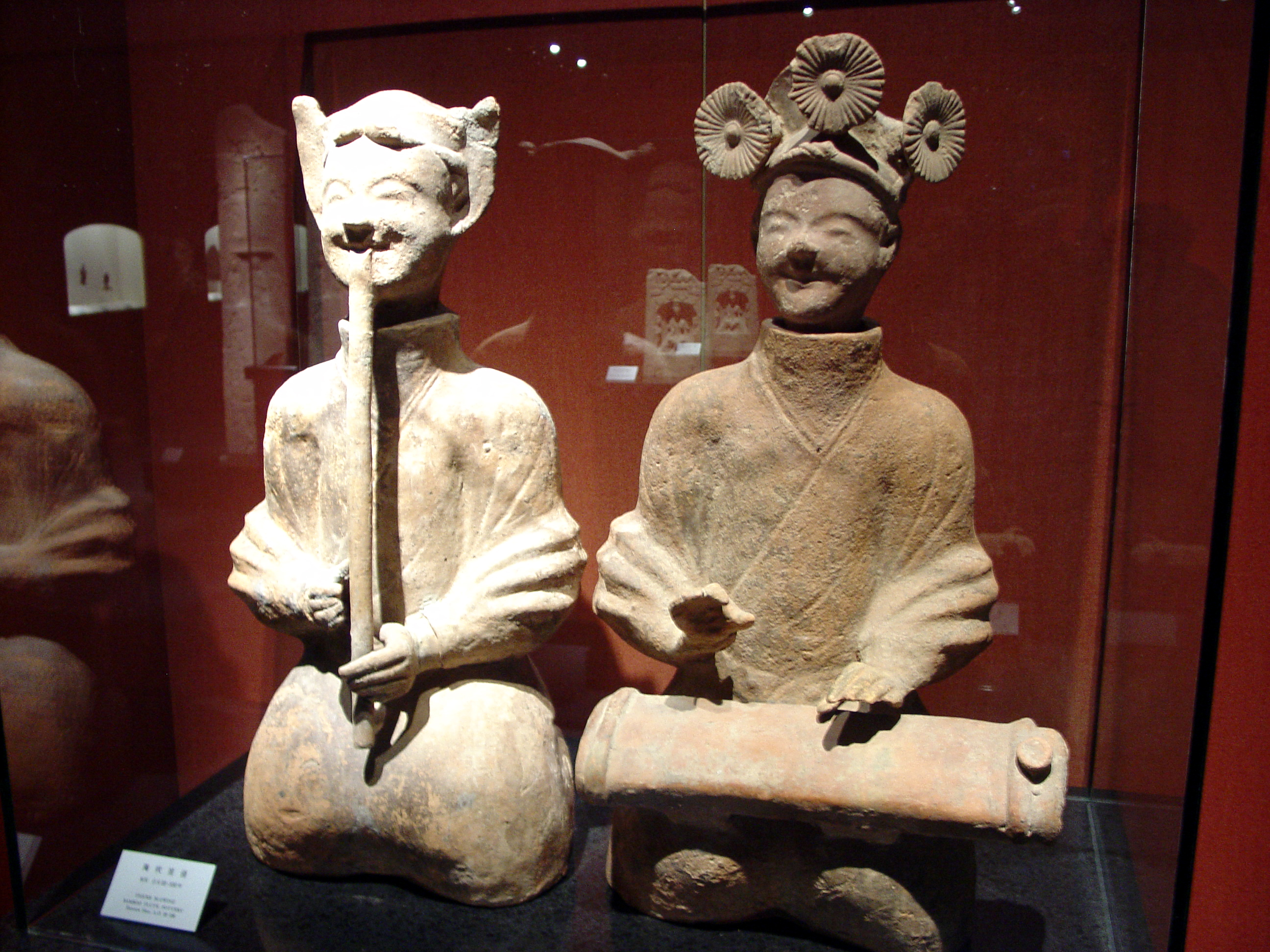
Lively musicians playing a bamboo flute and a plucked instrument, Chinese ceramic statues displayed at the Shanghai Museum, dating to the Eastern Han period (25–220 AD)

According to legends, the founder of music in Chinese mythology was Ling Lun who, at the request of the Yellow Emperor to create a system of music, made bamboo pipes tuned to the sounds of birds including the phoenix. A twelve-tone musical system was created based on the pitches of the bamboo pipes, the first of these pipes produced the 'yellow bell' (黃鐘) pitch, and a set of tuned bells were then created from the pipes.

=== Early history ===
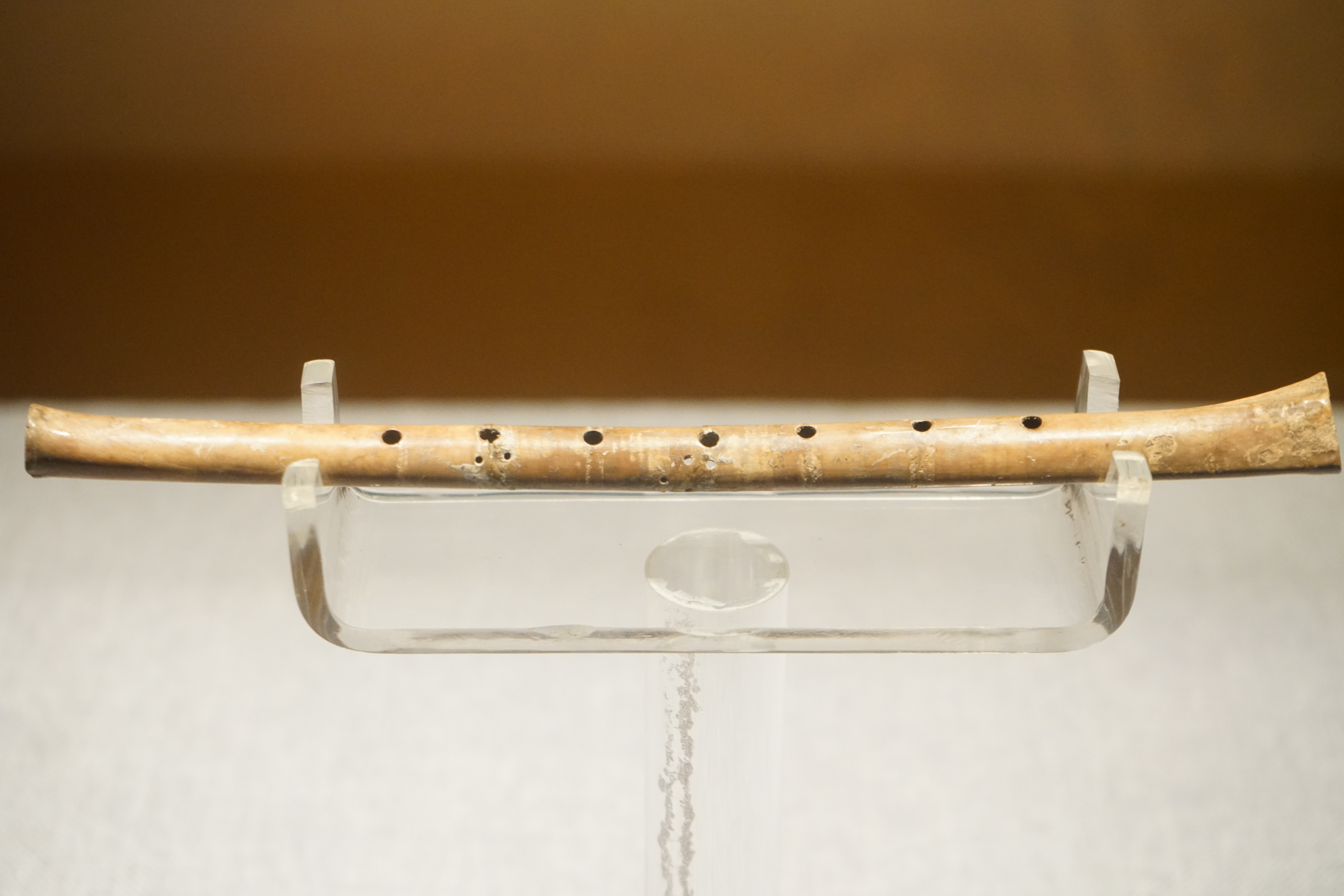
A 9,000 year-old bone flute from Henan

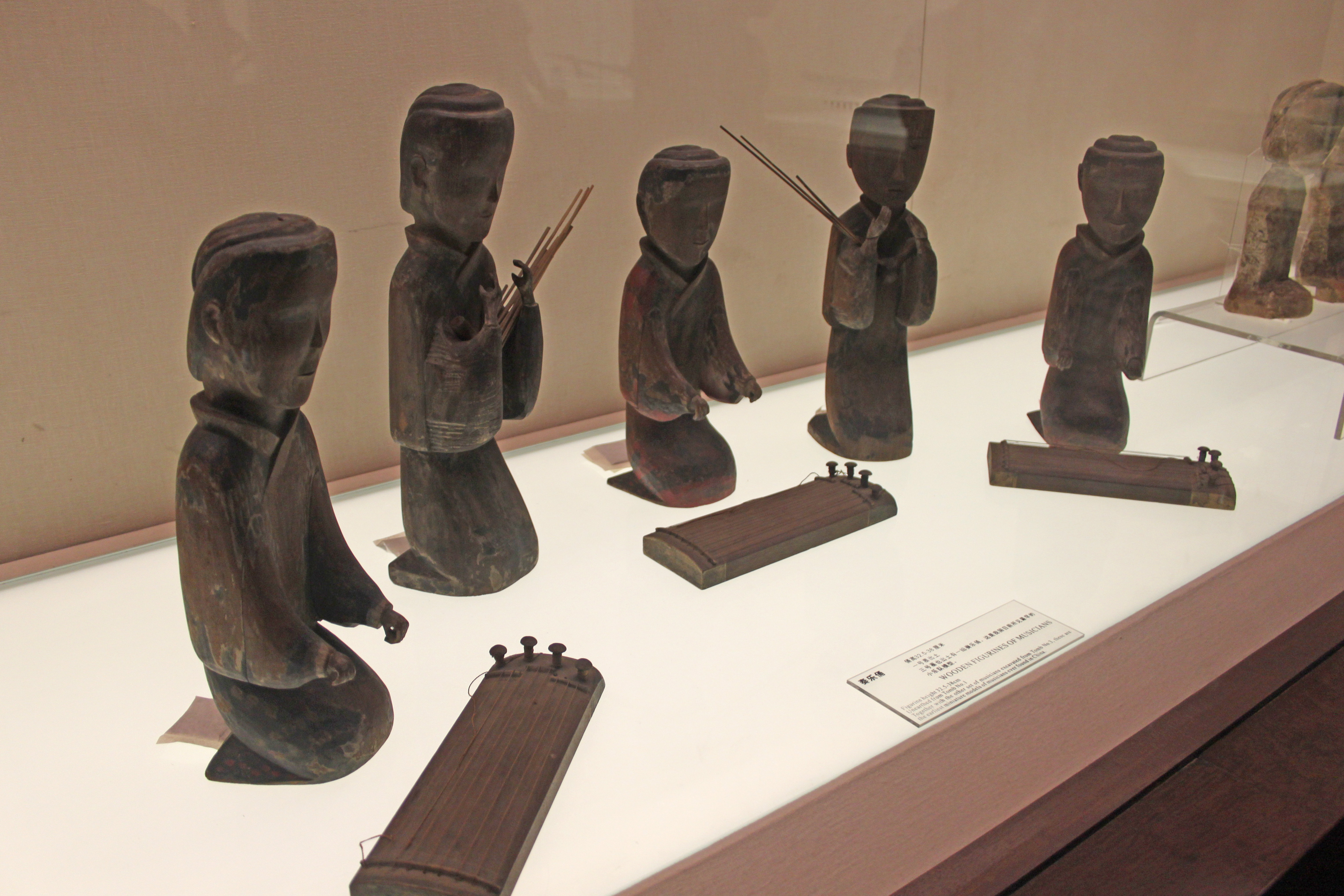
Ensemble of musicians, some playing the Guzheng and others play the Sheng, 2nd century BCE, Mawangdui tomb.

Archaeological evidence indicates that music culture developed in China from a very early period. Excavations in Jiahu Village in Wuyang County, Henan found bone flutes dated to 9,000 years ago, and clay music instruments called Xun thought to be 7,000 years old have been found in the Hemudu sites in Zhejiang and Banpo in Xi'an.

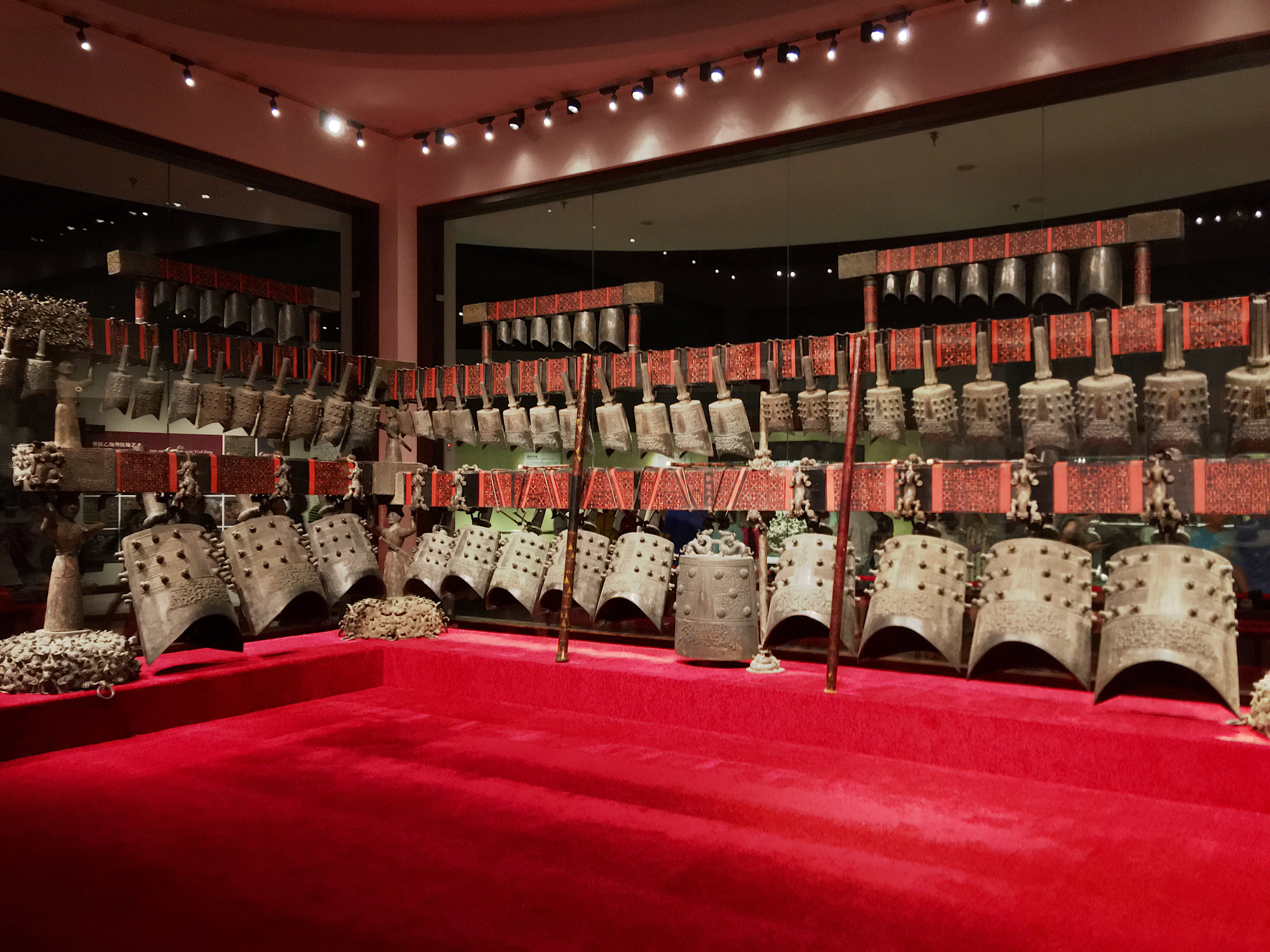
A set of bronze bells called bianzhong c. 5th century B.C. from Hubei

During the Zhou dynasty, a formal system of court and ceremonial music later termed yayue (meaning "elegant music") was established. The word music (樂, yue) in ancient China can also refer to dance as music and dance were considered integral part of the whole, and its meaning can also be further extended to poetry as well as other art forms and rituals. The word "dance" (舞) similarly also referred to music, and every dance would have had a piece of music associated with it. The most important set of music of the period was the Six-dynasty Music Dance (六代樂舞) performed in rituals in the royal court. Music in the Zhou dynasty was conceived as a cosmological manifestation of the sound of nature integrated into the binary universal order of yin and yang, and this concept has had an enduring influence over later Chinese thinking on music. "Correct" music according to Zhou concept would involve instruments correlating to the five elements of nature and would bring harmony to nature. Around or before the 7th century BC, a system of pitch generation and pentatonic scale was derived from a cycle-of-fifths theory.

Chinese philosophers took varying approaches to music. To Confucius, a correct form of music is important for the cultivation and refinement of the individual, and the Confucian system considers the formal music yayue to be morally uplifting and the symbol of a good ruler and stable government. Some popular forms of music, however, were considered corrupting in the Confucian view. Mozi on the other hand condemned making music, and argued in Against Music (非樂) that music is an extravagance and indulgence that serves no useful purpose and may be harmful. According to Mencius, a powerful ruler once asked him whether it was moral if he preferred popular music to the classics. The answer was that it only mattered that the ruler loved his subjects.

In ancient China the social status of musicians was much lower than that of painters, though music was seen as central to the harmony and longevity of the state. Higher-status literati who wished to play music avocationally tried to distance themselves from lower-status musicians, developing preferences for specific instruments like the guqin and specific performance practices and aesthetics. Almost every emperor took folk songs seriously, sending officers to collect songs to record the popular culture. One of the Confucianist Classics, The Classic of Poetry, contained many folk songs dating from 800 BC to about 400 BC.

=== Imperial China ===
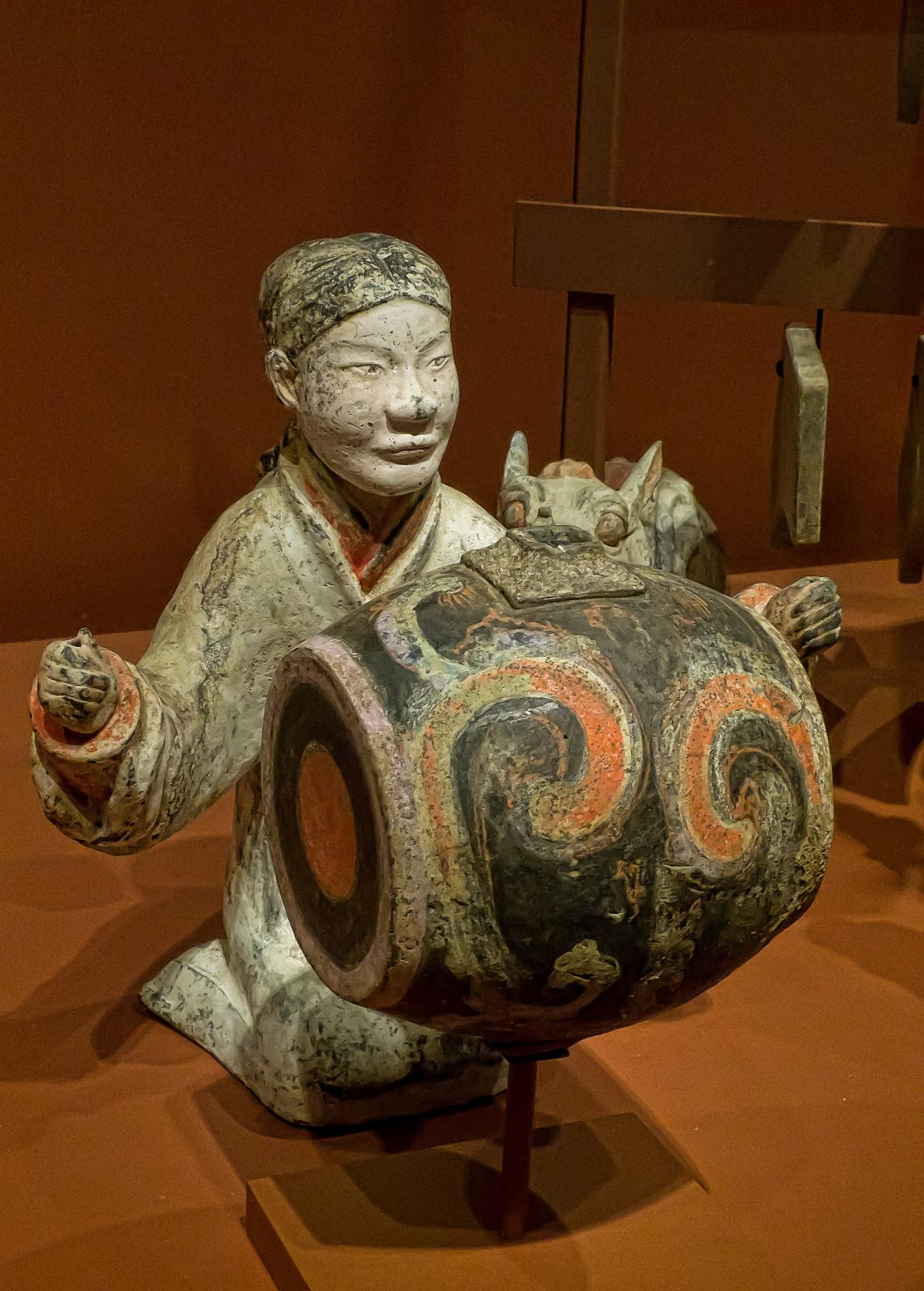
Han dynasty drummer

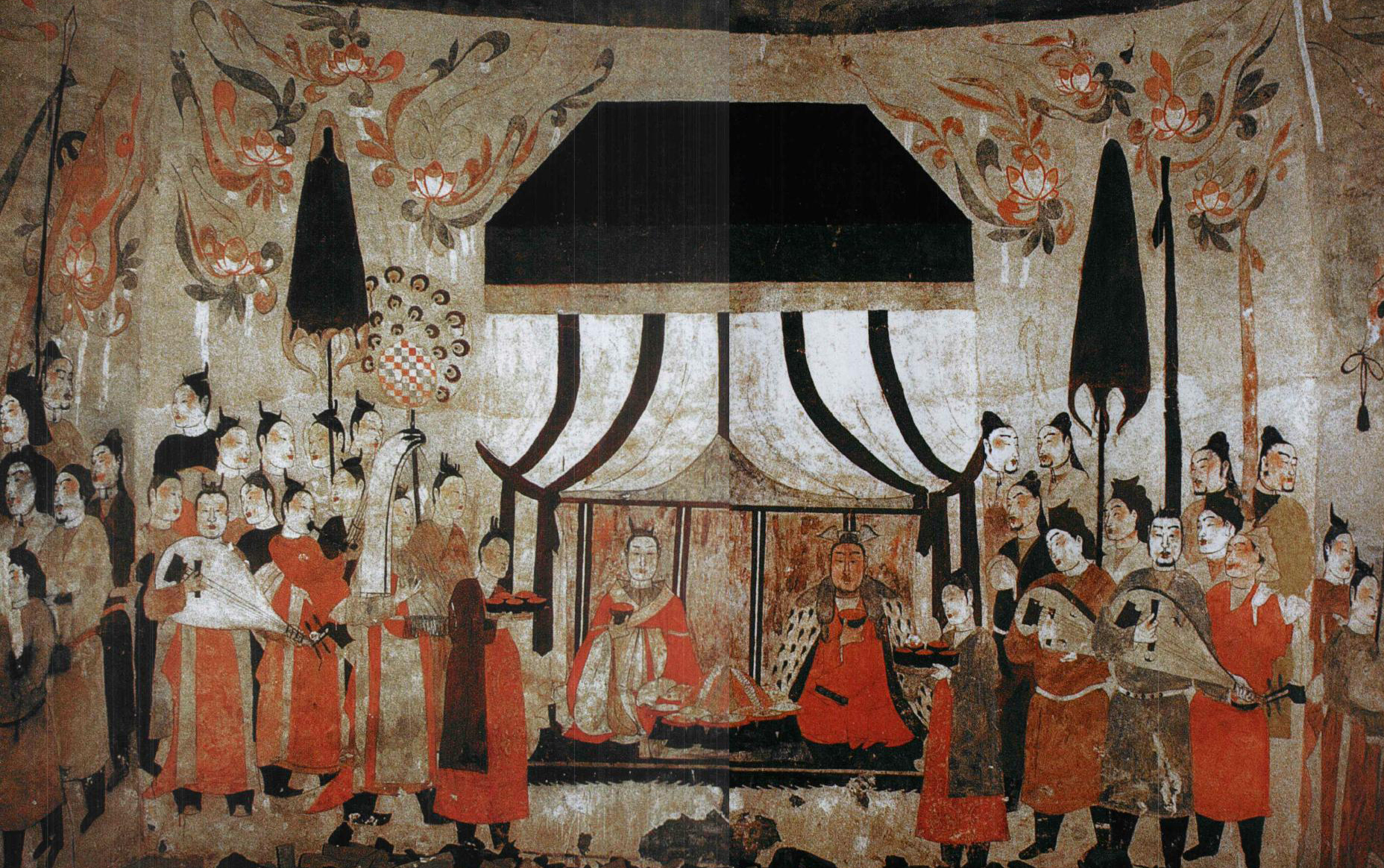
A mural from the tomb of Xu Xianxiu in Taiyuan, Shanxi province, dated 571 AD during the Northern Qi Dynasty, showing male court musicians playing stringed instruments, either the liuqin or pipa, and a woman playing a konghou (harp)

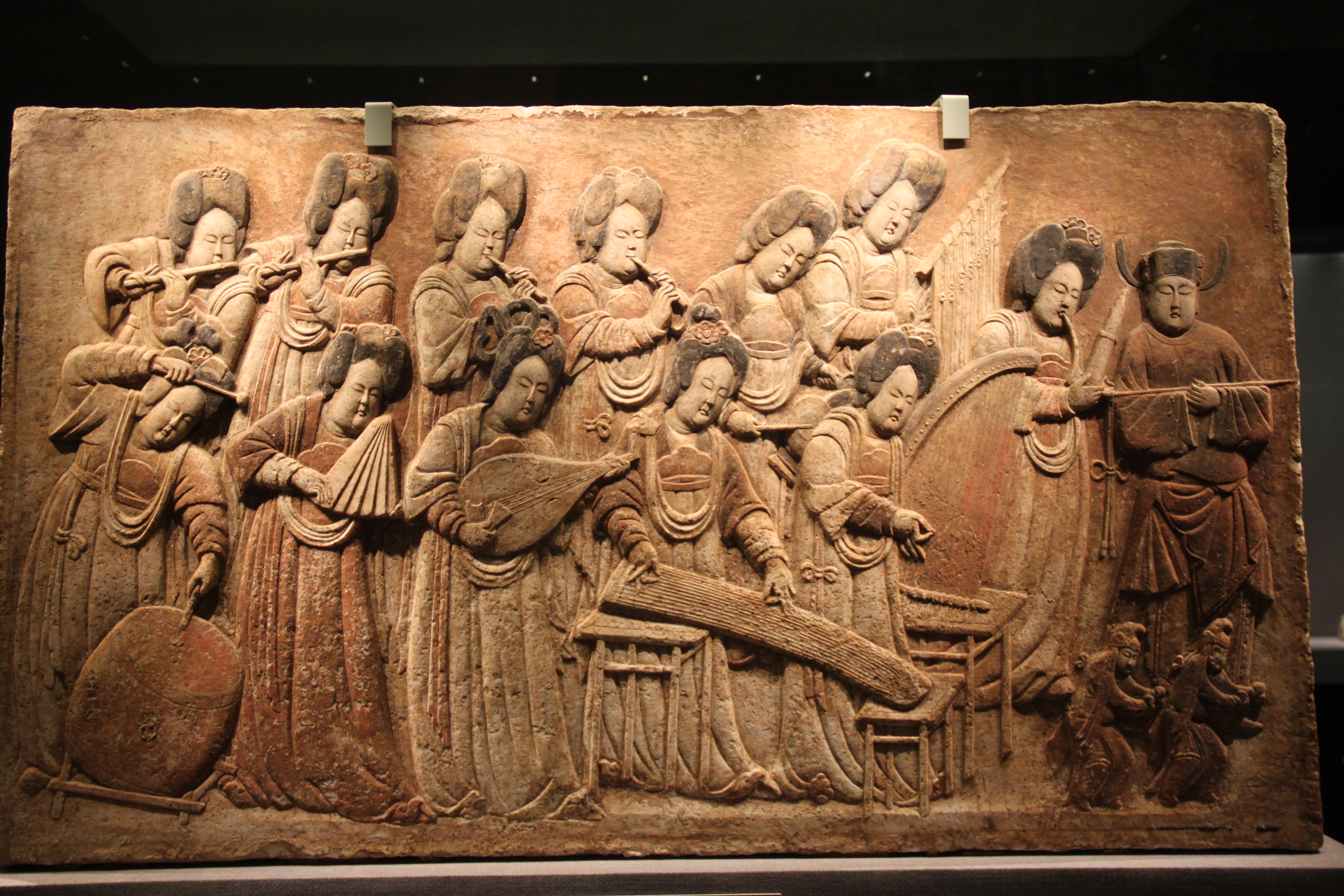
Five Dynasties relief of musicians

The Imperial Music Bureau, first established in the Qin dynasty (221–207 BC), was greatly expanded under the emperor Han Wudi (140–87 BC) and charged with supervising court music and military music and determining what folk music would be officially recognized. In subsequent dynasties, the development of Chinese music was influenced by the musical traditions of Central Asia which also introduced elements of Indian music. Instruments of Central Asian origin such as pipa were adopted in China, the Indian Heptatonic scale was introduced in the 6th century by a musician from Kucha named Sujiva, although the heptatonic scale was later abandoned.

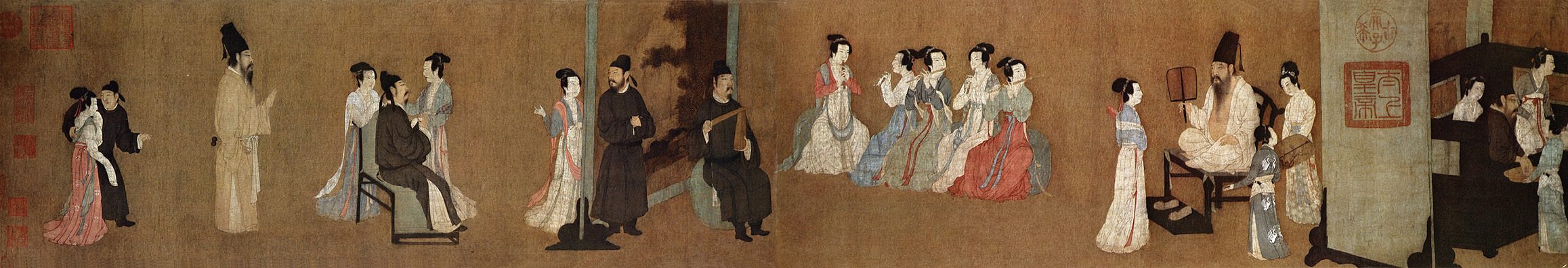
A half-section of the Song dynasty (960–1279) version of the Night Revels of Han Xizai, the original was by Gu Hongzhong in the Five Dynasties and Ten Kingdoms period (907–960); the female musicians in the center of the image are playing transverse bamboo flutes and guan, and the male musician is playing a wooden clapper called paiban.

The oldest extant written Chinese music is "Youlan" (幽蘭) or the Solitary Orchid, composed during the 6th or 7th century, but has also been attributed to Confucius. The first major well-documented flowering of Chinese music was for the qin during the Tang dynasty (618-907AD), though the qin is known to have been played since before the Han dynasty. This is based on the conjecture that because the recorded examples of Chinese music are ceremonial, and the ceremonies in which they were employed are thought to have existed "perhaps more than one thousand years before Christ", the musical compositions themselves were performed, even in 1000 BC, in precisely the manner prescribed by the sources that were written down in the seventh century AD. (It is based on this conjecture that Van Aalst dates the "Entrance Hymn for the Emperor" to c. 1000 BC.)

Yangguan Sandie [Three Refrains on the Yang Pass Theme], one of the great Tang masterpieces found in the Qinxue Rumen (1867) played on qin.

Through succeeding dynasties over thousands of years, Chinese musicians developed a large assortment of different instruments and playing styles. A wide variety of these instruments, such as guzheng and dizi are indigenous, although many popular traditional musical instruments were introduced from Central Asia, such as the erhu and pipa.

The presence of European music in China appeared as early as 1601 when the Jesuit priest Matteo Ricci presented a Harpsichord to the Ming imperial court, and trained four eunuchs to play it. During the late Qing dynasty era, the influence of Western music began to be felt.

=== Republican era (1912–1949) ===
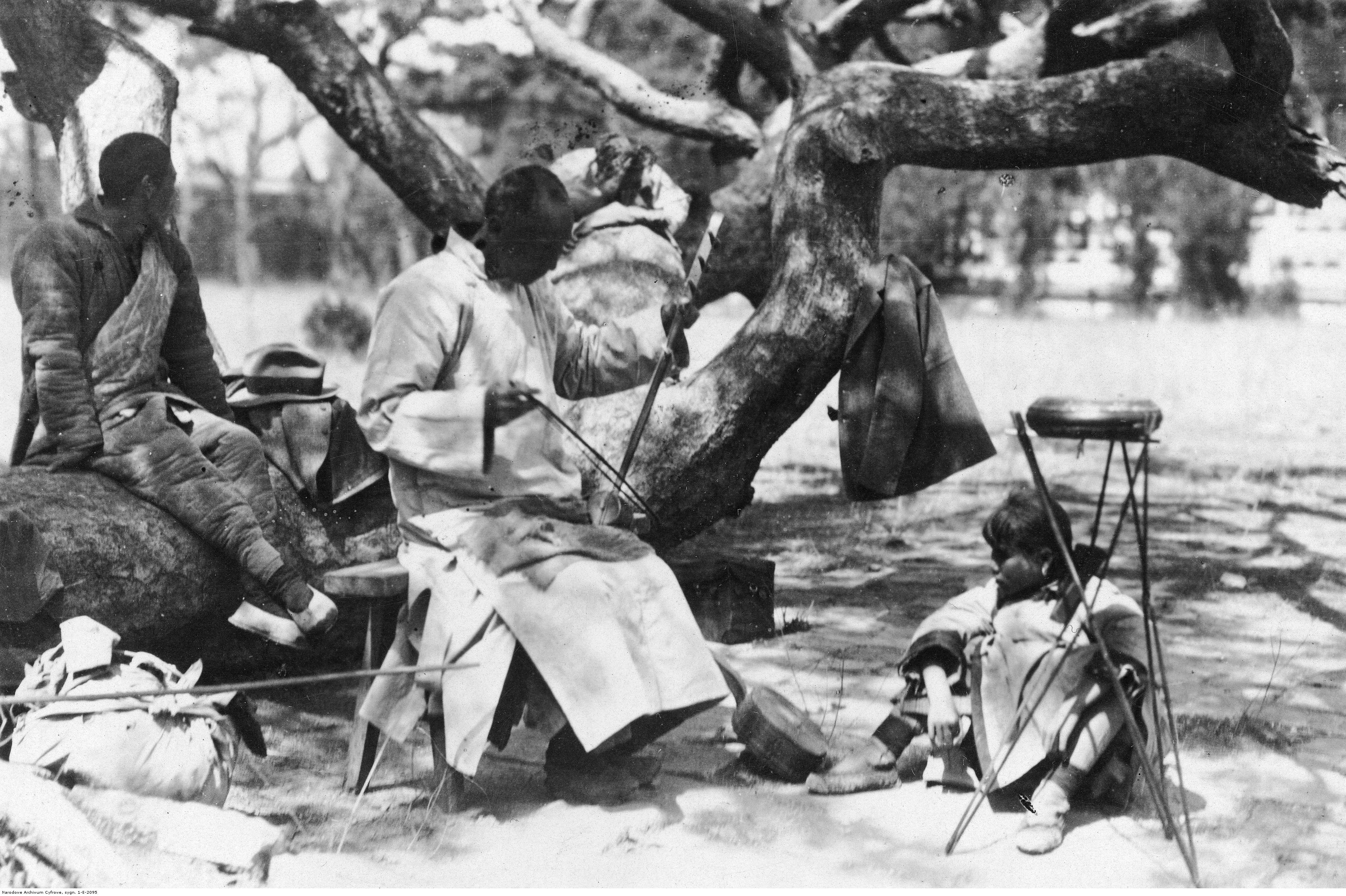
Blind Chinese Street Musician – Beijing (1930)

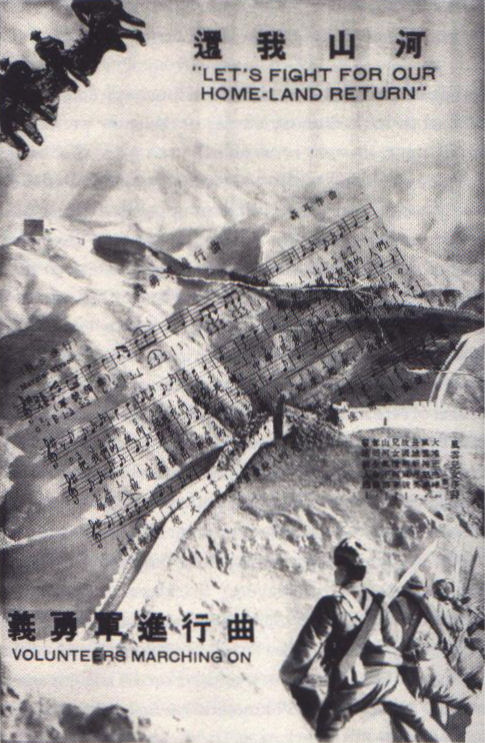
The earliest forms of the 1935 March of the Volunteers anthem in the Denton Gazette newspaper

The New Culture Movement of the 1910s and 1920s produced a great deal of lasting interest in Western music. A number of Chinese musicians returned from studying abroad to perform Western classical music, composing work hits on Western musical notation system. The Kuomintang tried to sponsor modern music adoptions via the Shanghai Conservatory of Music despite the ongoing political crisis. Twentieth-century cultural philosophers like Xiao Youmei, Cai Yuanpei, Feng Zikai and Wang Guangqi wanted to see Chinese music adopted to the best standard possible. There were many different opinions regarding the best standard.

Symphony orchestras were formed in most major cities and performed to a wide audience in the concert halls and on radio. Many of the performers added jazz influences to traditional music, adding xylophones, saxophones and violins, among other instruments. Lü Wencheng, Qui Hechou, Yin Zizhong and He Dasha were among the most notable performers and composers of this period.

In Shanghai, a popular genre of music called shidaiqu emerged in the 1920s. Shidaiqu is a fusion of Chinese and Western popular music, and Li Jinhui is considered to be founder of the genre. Popular singers in this genre in the 1930s and 1940s included Zhou Xuan, Li Xianglan and Yao Lee.

After the 1942 Yan'an Forum on Literature and Art, a large-scale campaign was launched in Chinese Communist Party-controlled areas to adapt folk music to create revolutionary songs to educate the largely illiterate rural population on party goals. Musical forms considered superstitious or anti-revolutionary were repressed, and harmonies and bass lines were added to traditional songs. One example is The East Is Red, a folksong from northern Shaanxi which was adapted into a nationalist hymn. Of particular note is the composer, Xian Xinghai, who was active during this period, and composed the Yellow River Cantata which is the most well-known of all of his works.

=== Post-revolution ===
==== 1949–1999 ====
The golden age of shidaiqu and the Seven great singing stars would come to an end when the CCP denounced Chinese popular music as yellow music (pornography). Maoists considered pop music as a decline to the art form in mainland China. In 1949 the Kuomintang relocated to Taiwan, and the People's Republic of China was established. Revolutionary songs would become heavily promoted by the state. The Maoists, during the Cultural Revolution, pushed revolutionary music as the only acceptable genre; because of propaganda, this genre largely overshadowed all others and came almost to define mainland Chinese music. This is still, in some ways, an ongoing process, but some scholars and musicians (Chinese and otherwise) are trying to revive old music.

After the 1989 Tiananmen Square protests and massacre, a new fast tempo Northwest Wind style was launched by protesters to counter the government. The music would progress into Chinese rock, which remained popular in the 1990s. However, music in China is very much state-owned as the TV, media, and major concert halls are all controlled by the CCP. The government mainly chose not to support Chinese rock by limiting its exposure and airtime. As a result, the genre never reached the mainstream in its entirety.

==== 2000–present ====
Annual events such as the Midi Modern Music Festival in Beijing attracts tens of thousands of visitors. There was also the "Snow Mountain Music Festival" in Yunnan province 2002.

Today, rock music is centered on almost exclusively in Beijing and Shanghai, and has very limited influence over Chinese society. Wuhan and Sichuan are sometimes considered pockets of rock music culture as well. It points to a significant cultural, political, and social difference that exist between China, the West, or even different parts within China. While rock has existed in China for decades, the milestone that put the genre on the international map is when Cui Jian played with The Rolling Stones in 2003, at the age of 42. China has also become a destination of major Western rock and pop artists; many foreign acts have toured in China and performed in multiple concerts in recent decades, including Beyoncé, Eric Clapton, Nine Inch Nails, Avril Lavigne, Linkin Park and Talib Kweli.

Mainland China has a high piracy rate along with issues of intellectual properties. Normally there is some delay before the products are released into mainland China, with occasional exceptions, such as the work of Cui Jian, which was released in Taiwan, Hong Kong and mainland China simultaneously. Consequently, a delay in release time is also the biggest driver of piracy, since individuals would rather pirate from the outside. The modern market is not only hindered by rights issues, as there are many other factors such as profit margin, income and other economical questions.

In 2015, the digital music market in China was expected to be worth US$2.1 billion. In 2015 China had the 14th largest music market in the world, with revenues of US$170 million. As of 2016 there were 213 music charts in China. Also as of 2016, the three largest music streaming and download services in China are KuGou, with a 28% share of the market, QQ Music with 15% and Kuwo with 13%. China was expected to become one of the largest music markets in the world by 2020.

== Traditional music ==
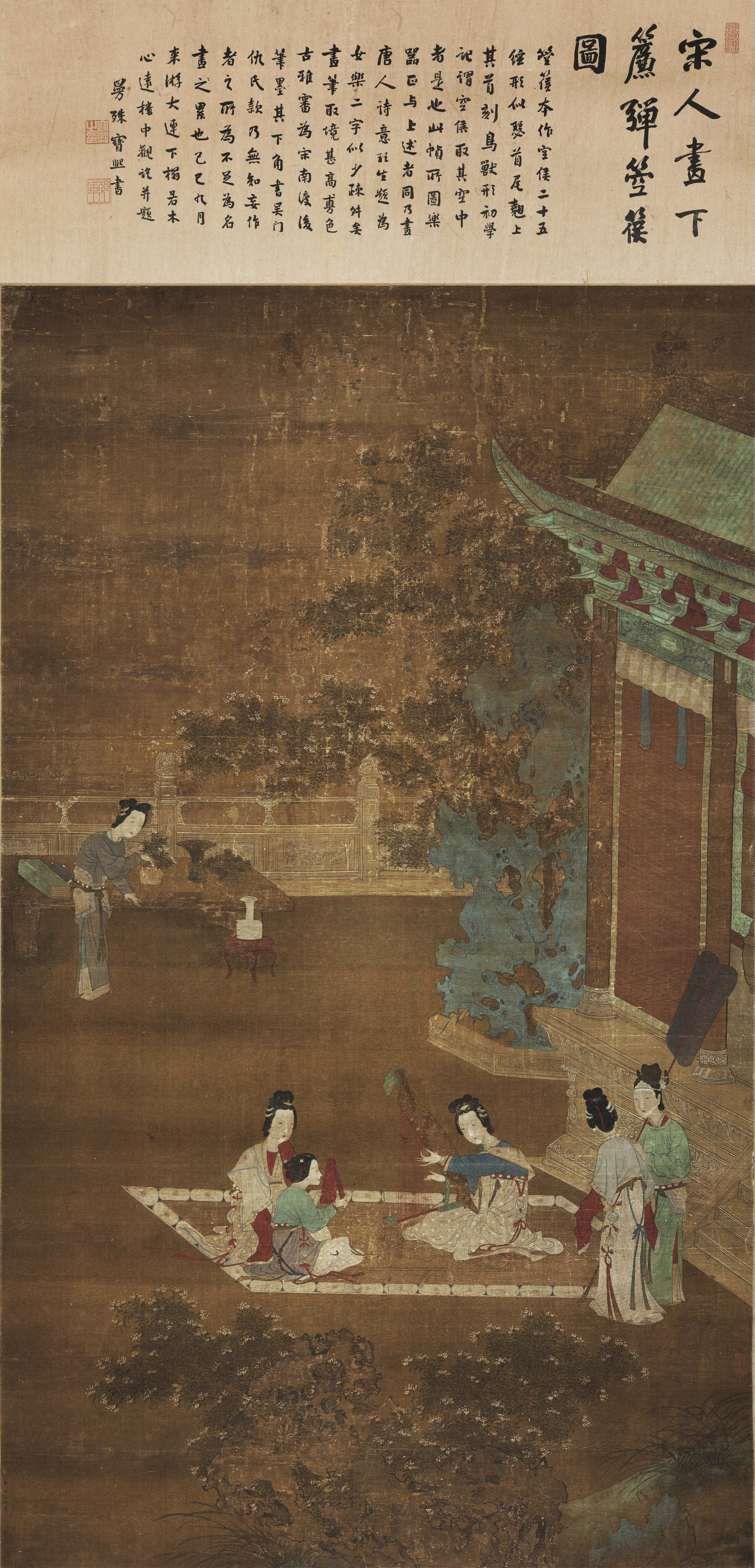
Women Playing Music, by Qiu Zhu (fl. 1565–1585)

=== Instrumental ===
Musical instruments were traditionally classified into eight categories known as bayin. Traditional music in China is played on solo instruments or in small ensembles of plucked and bowed stringed instruments, flutes, and various cymbals, gongs, and drums. The scale is pentatonic. Bamboo pipes and qin are among the oldest known musical instruments from China; instruments are traditionally divided into categories based on their material of composition: animal skins, gourd, bamboo, wood, silk, earth/clay, metal, and stone. Chinese orchestras traditionally consist of bowed strings, woodwinds, plucked strings and percussion. Under Xi Jinping, the current General Secretary of the Chinese Communist Party, traditional musical instruments have enjoyed a state-backed revival.

The Moon reflecting in Erquan Pool, a masterpiece written for erhu by the blind composer Abing.

Zuiyu Changwan (The Evening Song of the Drunken Fisherman) for qin from the Tianwen Ge Qinpu (1876).

Instruments

- Woodwind

dizi, xiao, suona, sheng, paixiao, guan, hulusi, bawu, xun

- Percussion

paigu, gong, bells, cymbals, bianzhong, fangxiang, paiban, bianqing

- Bowed strings

erhu, zhonghu, dahu, banhu, jinghu, gaohu, gehu, yehu, cizhonghu, diyingehu, leiqin

- Plucked and struck strings

guqin, sanxian, yueqin, yangqin, guzheng, ruan, konghou, liuqin, pipa, zhu

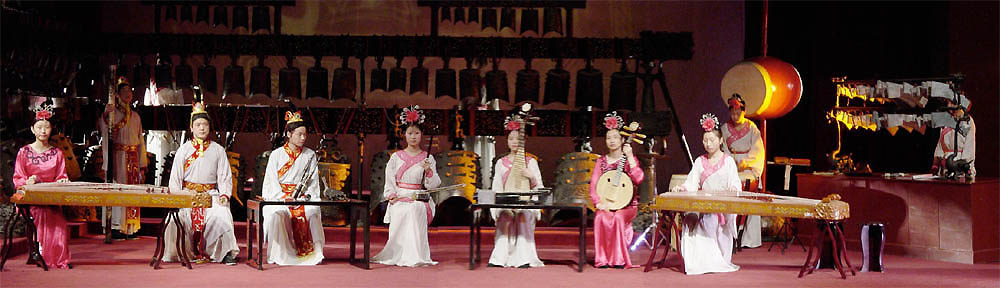
Re-enactment of a traditional music performance at Hubei Provincial Museum in Wuhan.

Chinese vocal music has traditionally been sung in a thin, non resonant voice or in falsetto and is usually solo rather than choral. All traditional Chinese music is melodic rather than harmonic. Chinese vocal music probably developed from sung poems and verses with music. Instrumental pieces played on an erhu or dizi are popular, and are often available outside of China, but the pipa and zheng music, which are more traditional, are more popular in China itself. The qin is perhaps the most revered instrument in China, even though very few people know what it is or seen and heard one being played. The zheng, a form of zither, is most popular in Henan, Chaozhou, Hakka areas, and Shandong. The pipa, a kind of lute, believed to have been introduced from the Arabian Peninsula area during the 6th century and adapted to suit Chinese tastes, is most popular in Shanghai and surrounding areas.

=== Music of the Han culture ===
People of the Han ethnic group make up about 92% of the population of China. Han people's music consists of heterophonic music, in which the musicians play versions of a single melodic line. Percussion accompanies most music, dance, talks, and opera. Han folk music had many aspects to it regarding its meaning, feelings, and tonality. This genre of music, in a sense, is similar to the Chinese language. This relationship is made by tones, sliding from higher tones to lower tones, or lower to higher tones, or a combination of both. These similarities mean that the instrument is a very important part in mastering technique with both left and right hands (left hand is used to create tonality on the string, right hand is for plucking or strumming the string), particularly for the classical (literati) tradition. Sometimes, singing can be put into the music to create a harmony or a melody accompanying the instrument. Han Chinese Folk's feelings are displayed in its poetry-like feeling to it with slow soothing tempos that express feelings that connect with the audience or whoever is playing the piece. Han folk music uses silences that alter its meaning, creating a sound similar to poetry.

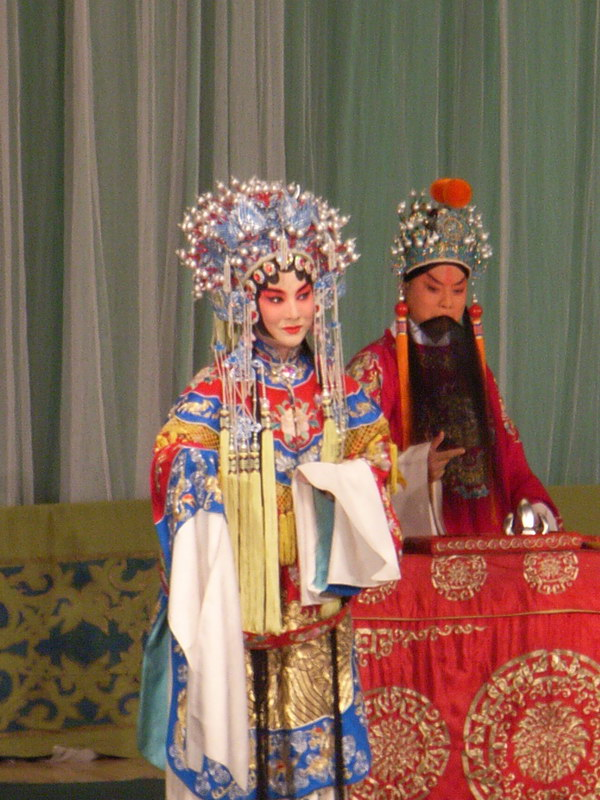
Performers in Peking Opera.

=== Chinese opera ===
Chinese opera is a comprehensive stage art that integrates literature, music, dance, martial arts, acrobatics, performance, and other artistic means. The basic skills are chang (唱; chàng; 'to sing'), nian (念; niàn; 'to read'), zuo (做; zuò; 'to do', and da (打; dǎ; 'to fight'). Characters are divided into sheng (生; shēng), male lead roles), dan (旦; dàn, female lead roles), jing (净; jìn, roles with face painting), chou (丑; chǒu, clown roles). Chinese opera music is mainly composed of singing (vocal singing and aside) and instrumental accompaniment.

Chinese opera accent: There are different types of drama in different regions, but they all have similarities. The four major accents in modern times are Kunshan accent (Kunshan), high accent (Yiyang), Pihuang accent, and Bangzi accent.

Kunshan accent: Popular in Jiangsu, Kunshan, and Wei Liangfu reforms in the Ming dynasty during the original Song and Yuan dynasties. The accent voice is soft and delicate. It later developed into South Kun accent and North Kun accent. South Kun accent dialect is popular in Jiangnan and Zhebei, and there are more literary operas, using five-tone tones. North Kun accent dialect is popular in Beijing, Baoding, music is extravagant, and used seven-tone style.

Gao accent: Formed in China Yiyang County, Jiangxi at the end of the Yuan dynasty. The main ones are Sichuan opera high accent, Xiang opera high accent, Gan opera high accent, Fujian siping opera. Only percussion accompaniment, no orchestra, five-tone style.

Bangzi accent: also known as "Xiqin" or "Luantan", because the music uses hardwood clappers, it is also called Bangzi tune. Originated from Northwest China. Mainly in seven tones. High-pitched and agitated, tragic and rough. The types of opera include Qin Opera, Jin Opera, Henan Opera, and Hebei Bangzi.

Pi Huang accent: It is an opera tune formed by the integration of the southeast and northwest regions of China. Composed of "Xipi" and "Erhuang". The main types of operas are Peking Opera (Beijing), Han Opera (Hubei), Cantonese Opera (Guangdong), Gui Opera (Guangxi), and Yunnan Opera (Yunnan).

=== Folk music ===
According to current archaeological discoveries, Chinese folk music dates back 7,000 years. Not only in form but also in artistic conception, China has been the home of a colorful culture of folk music. Largely based on the pentatonic scale, Chinese folk music is different from western traditional music, paying more attention to the form expression as well.

Han traditional weddings and funerals usually include a form of oboe called a suona and percussive ensembles called chuigushou. Ensembles consisting of mouth organs (sheng), shawms (suona), flutes (dizi) and percussion instruments (especially yunluo gongs) are popular in northern villages; their music is descended from the imperial temple music of Beijing, Xi'an, Wutai shan and Tianjin. Xi'an drum music, consisting of wind and percussive instruments, is popular around Xi'an, and has received some commercial popularity outside of China. Another important instrument is the sheng, pipes, an ancient instrument that is ancestor of all Western free reed instruments, such as the accordion. Parades led by Western-type brass bands are common, often competing in volume with a shawm/chuigushou band.

In southern Fujian and Taiwan, Nanyin or Nanguan is a genre of traditional ballads. They are sung by a woman accompanied by a xiao and a pipa, as well as other traditional instruments. The music is generally sorrowful and typically deals with a love-stricken woman. Further south, in Shantou, Hakka areas, and Chaozhou, erxian and zheng ensembles are popular.

Sizhu ensembles use flutes and bowed or plucked string instruments to make harmonious and melodious music that has become popular in the West among some listeners. These are popular in Nanjing and Hangzhou, as well as elsewhere along the southern Yangtze area. Sizhu has been secularized in cities but remains spiritual in rural areas.

Jiangnan Sizhu (silk and bamboo music from Jiangnan) is a style of instrumental music, often played by amateur musicians in tea houses in Shanghai; it has become widely known outside of its place of origin.

Guangdong Music or Cantonese Music is instrumental music from Guangzhou and surrounding areas. It is based on Yueju (Cantonese Opera) music, together with new compositions from the 1920s onwards. Many pieces have influences from jazz and Western music, using syncopation and triple time. This music tells stories and myths, maybe legends.

== Regional music ==
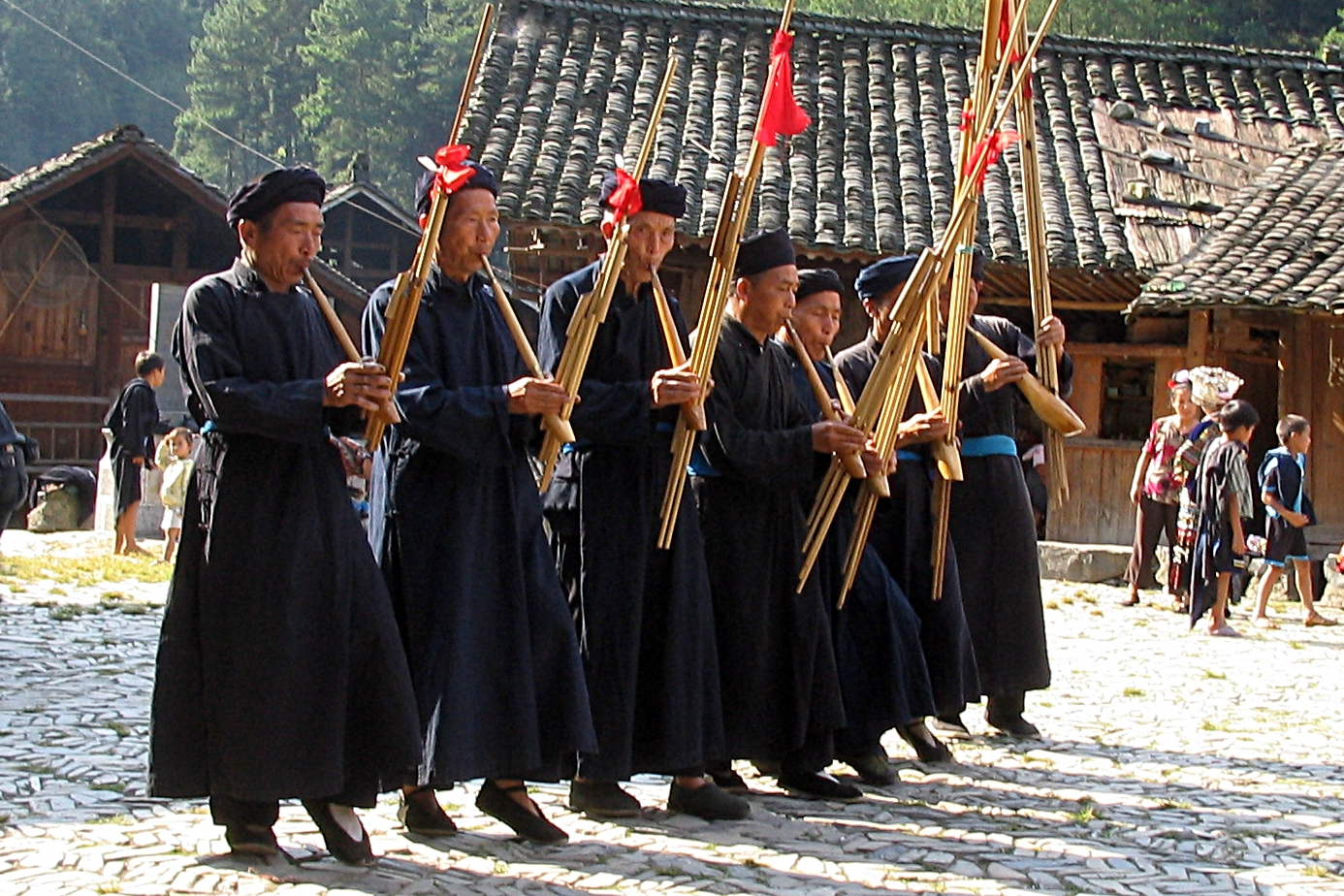
Miao musicians playing free-reed instruments in Guizhou

China has many ethnic groups besides the Han, who reside in various regions around the nation. These include Tibetans, Uyghurs, Manchus, Zhuang, Dai, Mongolians, Naxi, Miao, Wa, Yi, and Lisu.

=== Guangxi ===
Guangxi is a region of China, the Guangxi Zhuang Autonomous Region. Its most famous performer of Guangxi is the legendary Zhuang folksinger, 刘三姐 (pinyin: liú sān jiě) or Third Sister Liu, born in Guangxi during the Southern Song dynasty (1127–1279) and who was the subject of the 1961 film, Liu Sanjie which introduced Guangxi's culture to the rest of the world.

Zhuang folk songs and Han Chinese music are a similar style, and are mostly in the pentatonic scale. The lyrics have an obvious antithesis format. They frequently contain symbols and metaphors, and common themes include life experiences as well as allusions to classical Chinese stories.

The Jing or Gin people (ethnic Vietnamese) are one of the smallest populations of ethnic and the only coastal fishery ethnic minority of China. They are known for their instrument called duxianqin (lit. "single string zither"), a string instrument with only one string, said to date back to the 8th century.

=== Hong Kong ===
The music of Hong Kong notably includes the Cantonese Chinese pop music known as cantopop.

=== Hua'er ===
Hua'er is a form of traditional a cappella singing that is popular in the mountainous northwestern Chinese provinces such as Gansu, Ningxia, and Qinghai.

=== Inner Mongolia ===
Mongolian folk songs have a "long tune" and a "short tune". The Mongolians have a variety of stringed instruments such as morin khuur or horsehead fiddle. It is named because of its headstock carving of a horse used as decoration on the pillar.

=== Kuaiban ===
Kuaiban is a type of rhythmic talking and singing which is often performed with percussive instruments such as a clapper called paiban. The center of the kuaiban tradition is Shandong province. Kuaiban bears some resemblance to rap and other forms of rhythmic music found in other cultures.

=== Northeast China ===
Northeast China is a region inhabited by ethnic groups like the Manchu. The most prominent folk instrument is the octagonal drum, while the youyouzha lullaby is also well-known.

=== Sichuan ===
Sichuan is a province in southwest China. Its capital city, Chengdu, is home to the only musical higher education institution in the region, the Sichuan Conservatory of Music. The province has a long history of Sichuan opera.

=== Tibet ===
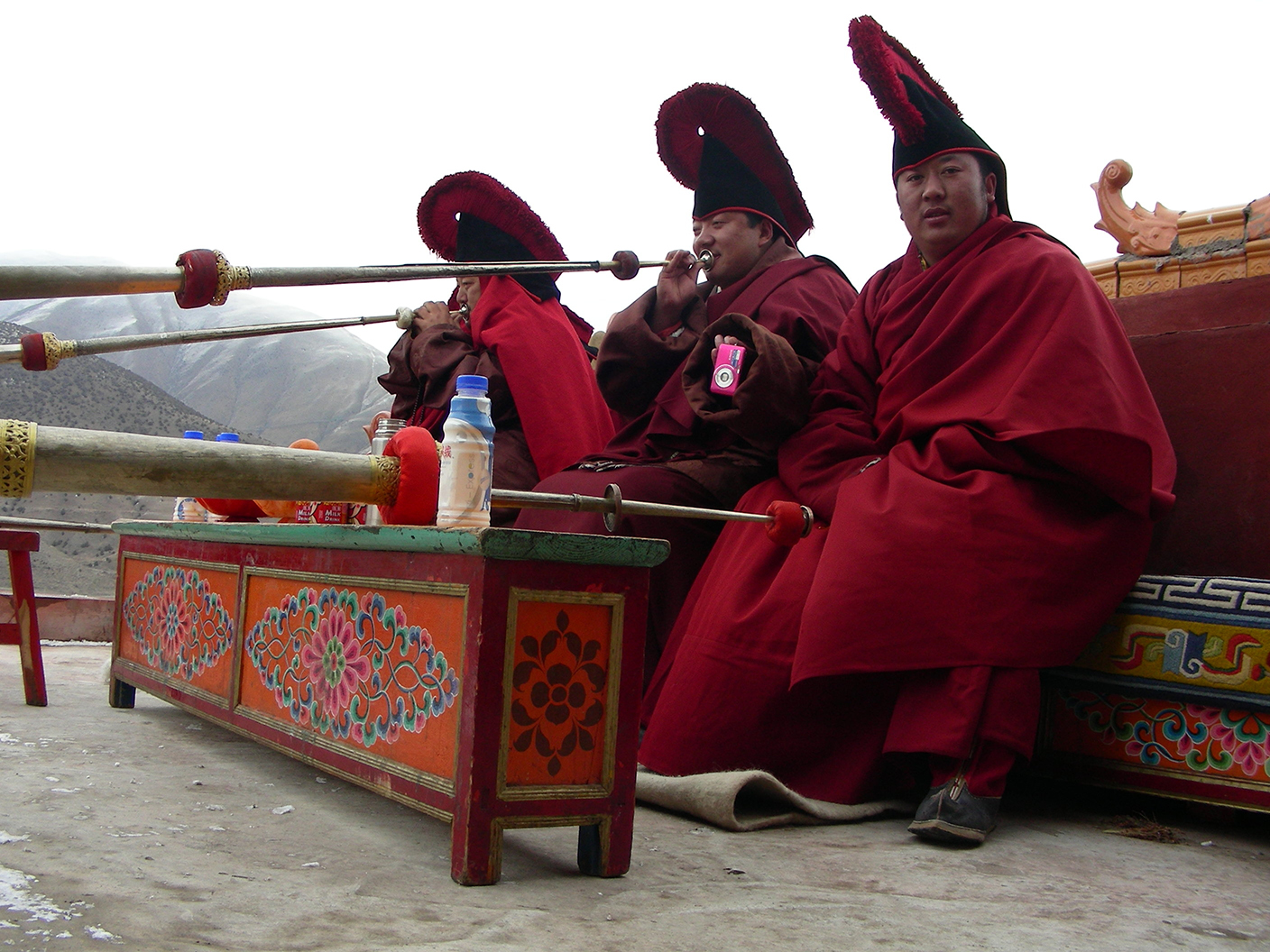
Monks playing Tibetan horns

Music forms an integral part of Tibetan Buddhism. While chanting remains perhaps the best known form of Tibetan Buddhist music, complex and lively forms are also widespread. Monks use music to recite various sacred texts and to celebrate a variety of festivals during the year. The most specialized form of chanting is called yang, which is without metrical timing and is dominated by resonant drums and sustained, low syllables. Other forms of chanting are unique to Tantra as well as the four main monastic schools: Gelugpa, Kagyupa, Nyingmapa and Sakyapa. Of these schools, Gelugpa is considered a more restrained, classical form, while Nyingmapa is widely described as romantic and dramatic. Gelugpa is perhaps the most popular.

Secular Tibetan music survived the Cultural Revolution more intact than spiritual music, especially due to the Tibetan Institute of Performing Arts, which was founded by the Dalai Lama shortly after his exile. TIPA originally specialized in the operatic lhamo form, which has since been modernized with the addition of Western and other influences. Other secular genres include nangma and toshe, which are often linked and are accompanied by a variety of instruments designed for highly rhythmic dance music. Nangma karaoke is popular in modern Lhasa. A classical form called gar is very popular, and is distinguished by ornate, elegant and ceremonial music honoring dignitaries or other respected persons.

Tibetan folk music includes a cappella lu songs, which are distinctively high in pitch with glottal vibrations, as well as now rare epic bards who sing the tales of Gesar, Tibet's most popular hero.

Tibetan music has influenced the pioneering compositions of Philip Glass and, most influentially, Henry Eichheim. Later artists made new-age fusions by pioneers Henry Wolff and Nancy Hennings. These two collaborated on Tibetan Bells, perhaps the first fusion of New Age and Tibetan influences, in 1971. Glass' Kundun soundtrack proved influential in the 1990s, while the popularity of Western-adapted Buddhism (exemplified by Richard Gere, Yungchen Lhamo, Steve Tibbetts, Choying Drolma, Lama Karta and Kitaro and Nawang Khechong) helped further popularize Tibetan music.

In the mid- to late 1980s, a relaxation of governmental rules allowed a form of Tibetan pop music to emerge in Tibet proper. Direct references to native religion is still forbidden, but commonly understood metaphors are widespread. Pure Tibetan pop is heavily influenced by light Chinese rock, and includes best-sellers like Jampa Tsering and Yatong. Politically and socially aware songs are rare in this form of pop, but commonplace in a second type of Tibetan pop. Nangma karaoke bars appeared in 1998 and are common in Lhasa, in spite of threats from the Chinese government.

=== Xinjiang ===
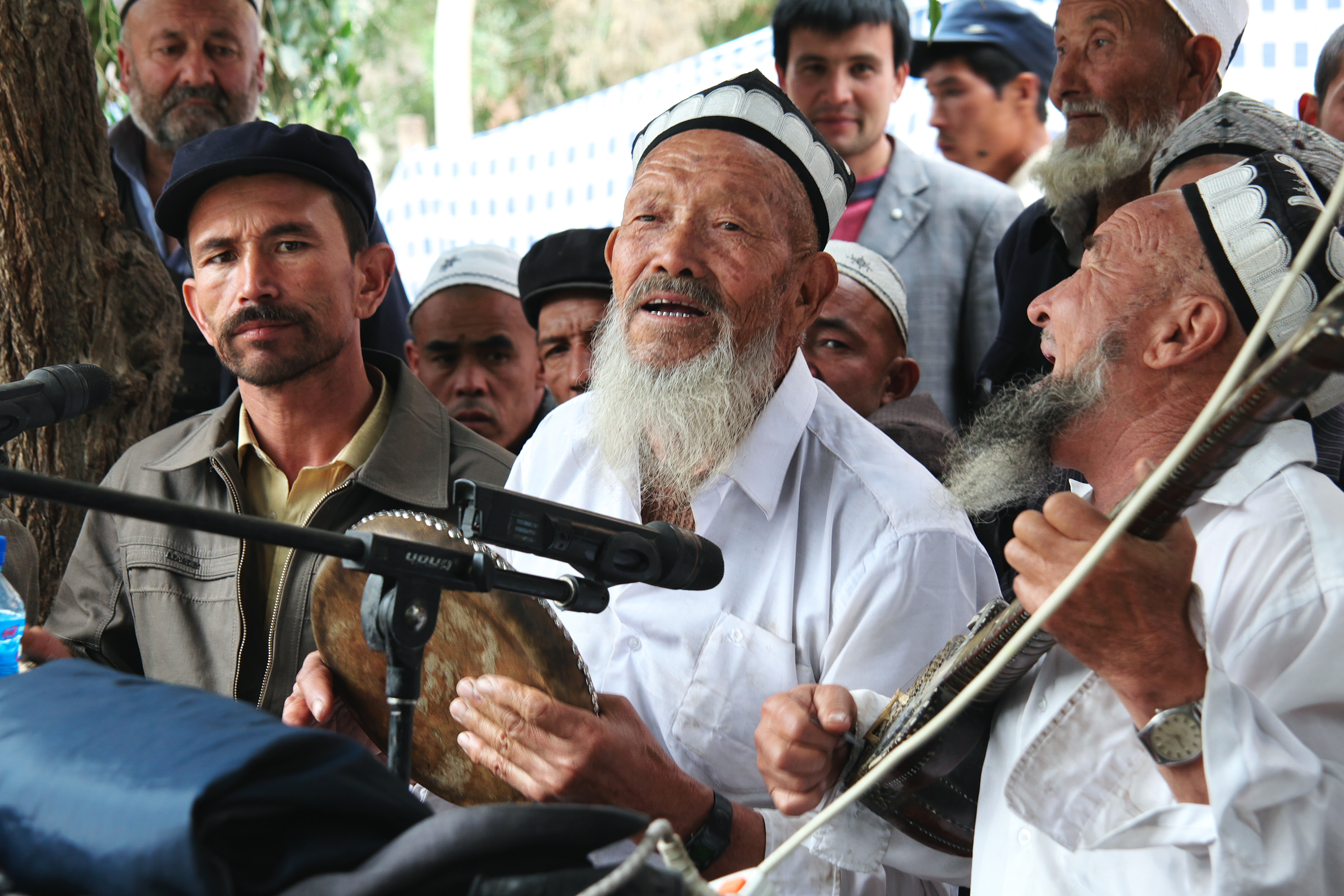
Uyghur Meshrep musicians in Yarkand.

Xinjiang Uyghur Autonomous Region is dominated by Uyghurs, a Turkic people related to other Turkic groups from Central Asia. The Uyghurs' best-known musical form is the On Ikki Muqam, a complex suite of twelve sections related to Uzbek and Tajik forms. These complex symphonies vary wildly between suites in the same muqam, and are built on a seven-note scale. Instruments typically include dap (a drum), dulcimers, fiddles and lutes; performers have some space for personal embellishments, especially in the percussion. The most important performer is Turdi Akhun, who recorded most of the muqams in the 1950s.

=== Yunnan ===
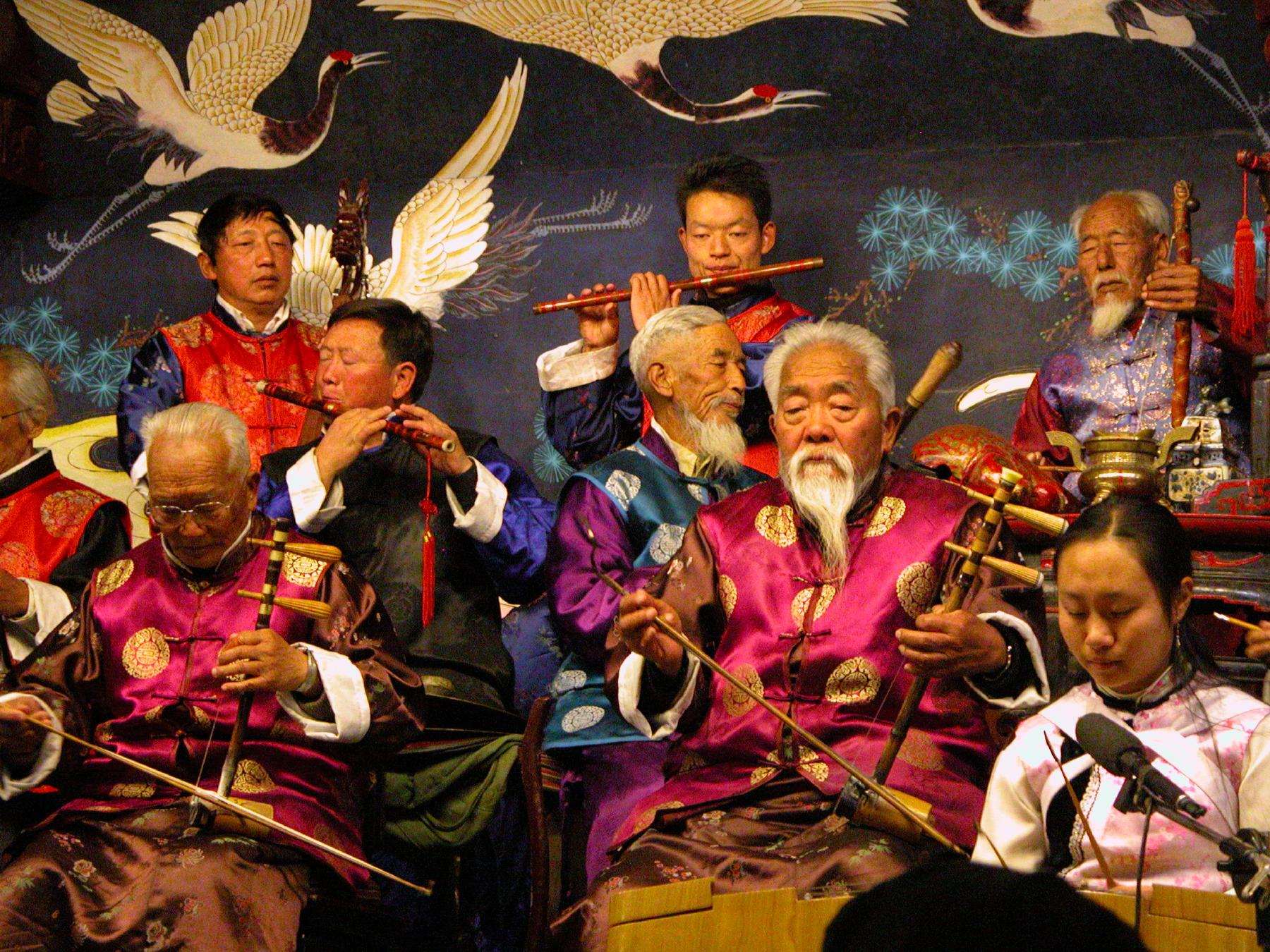
Nakhi musicians

Yunnan is an ethnically diverse area in southwest China. Perhaps best known from the province is the lusheng, a type of mouth organ, used by the Miao people of Guizhou for pentatonic antiphonal courting songs.

The Hani of Honghe Prefecture are known for a unique kind of choral, micro-tonal rice-transplanting songs.

The Nakhi of Lijiang play a type of song and dance suite called baisha xiyue, which was supposedly brought by Kublai Khan in 1253. Nakhi Dongjing is a type of music related to southern Chinese forms, and is popular today.

The Dai ethnic musical styles are similar to those of South Asia, Myanmar, and Thailand. Some typical Dai instruments are the hulusi and the elephant-foot drum.

== Modern changes ==
In the early 20th century after the end of Imperial China, there were major changes to traditional Chinese music as part of the New Culture Movement. Much of what Westerners and even Chinese now consider to be music in the traditional Chinese style can be dated to this period and is in fact less than 100 years old. The modernization of Chinese music involved the adoption of some aspects of Western forms and values, such as the use of Western conservatory system of teaching, and changes to the instruments and their tuning, the composition, the orchestration of music, the notation system and performance style. Some forms of Chinese music however remained traditional and are little changed.

=== National music ===
The term guoyue, or national music, became popular in the early 20th century and was used loosely to include all music written for Chinese instruments in response to a particular nationalistic consciousness. The term however may have a slightly different meaning when used by different Chinese communities. It was originally used only to refer to the music of the Han Chinese; it later began to include music of various ethnic minorities in China. In the Republic of China in Taiwan, Guoyue emphasized music of the mainland China over the Taiwanese local traditions. In mainland China a new term minyue (民乐, short for minzu yinyue or "folk music") was coined post-1949 in place of guoyue to encompass all compositions and genres for traditional instruments. In other Chinese communities, it may also be referred to as huayue (for example in Singapore) or zhongyue (in Hong Kong).

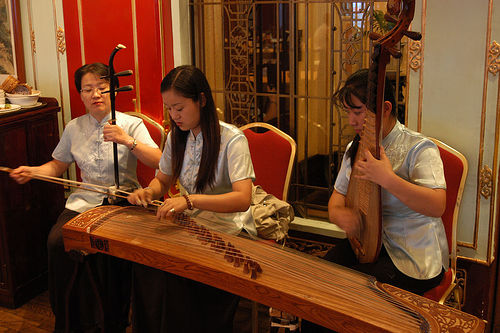
Chinese musicians at a restaurant in Shanghai

=== Chinese orchestra ===
There was a tradition of massed instruments in the ritual court music form known as yayue since the Zhou dynasty. This music may be played by a handful of musicians, or there may be more than 200 for example during the Song dynasty. During the Tang dynasty there were also large-scale presentations of banquet music called yanyue (燕樂) in the court. The Tang imperial court may have had up to ten different orchestras, each performing a different kind of music. It also had a large outdoor band of nearly 1,400 performers.

The modern Chinese orchestra however was created in the 20th century modeled on Western symphony orchestra using Chinese instruments. In the traditional yanyue, a single dominant melodic line was favored, but the new music and arrangements of traditional melodies created for this modern orchestra is more polyphonic in nature.

=== Instruments and tuning ===
Many traditional instruments underwent changes in the early to mid 20th century which has a profound effect on the performance and sound of Chinese music, and a western equal temperament is now used to tune most traditional instruments, which to modern ears seem less harsh and more harmonious but which also robs the instruments of their traditional voices. To ears now used to hearing modern tunings, even Chinese ones, traditional tunings can sound out of tune and discordant.

In order to accommodate Western system, changes were made to the instruments, for example in the pipa the number of frets was increased to 24, based on the 12 tone equal temperament scale, with all the intervals being semitones.

There is also a need to standardize the tuning when the instruments are played in an orchestra, which in turn may also affect how the instrument is made. For example, traditionally dizi is made by using a solid piece of bamboo which made it impossible to change the fundamental tuning once the bamboo is cut. This issue was resolved in the 1920s by the insertion of a copper joint to connect two pieces of shorter bamboo, which allows the length of the bamboo to be modified so that minute adjustment to its fundamental pitch can be made. The Xindi, "new flute", is a 1930s redesign of the Chinese flute incorporating western influences on the basis of equal temperament.

In order to achieve a greater vibrancy and loudness with instruments (not to mention longevity), many string instruments are no longer strung with silk but with steel or nylon. For example, metal strings began to be used in place of the traditional silk ones in the 1950s for pipa, resulting in a change in the sound of the pipa which became brighter and stronger.

=== Notation ===
Before the 20th century Chinese used the gongche notation system, in modern times the Jianpu system is common. Western staff notation however is also used.

=== Performance ===
In common with the music traditions of other Asian cultures, such as Persia and India, one strand of traditional Chinese music consists of a repertoire of traditional melodies, together known as qupai, in which tempo and ornamentation vary according to the mood of the instrumentalist, the audience, and their reaction to what is being played, the same melody can be used to serve many different roles be it merry, melancholic or martial (this can be glimpsed in the love theme of the Butterfly Lovers' Violin Concerto where the same melody at different points in the lover's story reflects elation, turbulence and dejection). Many modern performers now play pieces by following a score in a standard way rather than in the changeable reflective individual way of tradition, this can at times lead to the feeling that a performance has been rushed.

== Modern popular music ==
=== Pop music ===
Chinese popular music found its beginnings in the shidaiqu genre. The shidaiqu genre was founded by Li Jinhui in mainland China and was influenced by Western jazz artists like Buck Clayton. After the Chinese Communist Revolution, popular music were denounced as Yellow Music, a form of pornography. and record companies of Shanghai such as Baak Doi in 1952 left China. Mainland China was left on the sidelines in the development of pop music for a few decades, as the Chinese pop music industry moved from Shanghai to Hong Kong and Taiwan. The 1970s saw the rise of cantopop in Hong Kong, and mandopop in its neighboring country Taiwan.

In the late 1970s, economic reforms by Deng Xiaoping in mainland China led to the introduction of gangtai culture of Hong Kong and Taiwan, and pop music returned to mainland China. However, for a time the government still have a censorious attitude toward pop music; for example, Hong Kong's icon Anita Mui was banned from returning to the mainland concert stage after performing the song "Bad Girl" during the 1990s in China as punishment for what the Chinese government called her rebellious attitude. Nevertheless, pop music continued to increase in popularity in mainland China, and by 2005, China had overtaken Taiwan in term of the retail value of its music sales. The beginning of the 21st century has seen an increasing number of mainland Chinese artists who produced a wide range of Mandarin pop songs and the release of many new albums. However, despite having a much larger population and increasing consumption of Chinese pop music, China is not yet considered a major production hub of pop music.

Many popular mainland Chinese, Hong Kong and Taiwanese music artists were included in promotions for the 2008 Beijing Olympics.

=== Hip hop and rap ===
Mandarin rap music gradually became popular in mainland China, especially in Shanghai, Beijing, Chongqing and Sichuan where pop culture is very diverse and modern. Although Chinese perform rap in different dialects and languages, most Chinese hip hop artists perform in China's most popular language: Mandarin.

Cantonese rap is also very diverse in cities such as Guangzhou, Shenzhen and Hong Kong.

=== Electronic music ===
Electronic dance music (EDM) has become the second biggest music category in China. Among the sub-genres, house music is at the top, followed by bass music and trap music. Reality talent shows and competition programs such as Rave Now and E-Pop of China contributed to promote electronic music towards the mainstream audience.

In recent years, numerous of local Chinese electronic music producers have emerged and got signed by international major labels. Chace, the first Chinese disc jockey (DJ) to play on the main stage of Tomorrowland, has been signed by Universal Music Group. Young Chinese DJ Carta has been signed by Spinnin' Records, listing himself on the DJ Mag Top 100.

A growing number of Chinese producers seek to collaborate with renowned foreign musicians and singers from the Western world. Local electronic music producer Zight collaborated with American singer Chris Willis and Italian DJ duo Maximals to release single "Work It Harder". At the meantime, local electronic singer-songwriter CORSAK has teamed up with Swedish DJ Alesso, releasing their global hit Going Dumb.

== Rock and heavy metal ==
The Peking All-Stars were a rock band formed in Beijing in 1979, by foreigners then resident in the Chinese capital.

The widely acknowledged forefather of Chinese rock is Cui Jian. In the late 1980s he played the first Chinese rock song called: "Nothing To My Name" ("Yi wu suo you"). It was the first time an electric guitar was used in China. He became the most famous performer of the time, and by 1988 he performed at a concert broadcast worldwide in conjunction with the Seoul Summer Olympic Games. His socially critical lyrics earned him the anger of the government and many of his concerts were banned or cancelled. After the Tiananmen Square protests of 1989, he played with a red blindfold around his head as an action against the government.

Afterwards, two bands became famous Black Panther and Tang Dynasty. Both started during the late 1980s and early 1990s. Hei Bao is an old-school rock band whose first CD, Hei Bao used the popular English song ("Don't Break My Heart"). Tang Dynasty was the first Chinese heavy metal band. Its first CD "A Dream Return to Tang Dynasty" combines elements of traditional Chinese opera and old school heavy metal. The album was a major breakthrough releasing around 1991/1992.

Around 1994–96: the first thrash metal band, Chao Zai (Overload), was formed. They released three CDs, the last one in cooperation with pop singer Gao Chi of the split-up band The Breathing. At the same time the first nu metal bands were formed and inspired by Western bands such as Korn, Limp Bizkit or Linkin Park. China would have their own with Yaksa, Twisted Machine, AK-47, Overheal Tank.

Black metal is becoming a prominent scene in mainland China, particularly central China.

=== Punk rock and post-punk ===
Punk rock first emerged in China in the early 1990s as records from Western punk and post-punk bands were imported into mainland China for the first time. One of the earliest and most renowned punk-influenced Chinese artists was He Yong whose debut album Garbage Dump was released in 1994.

Formed in Nanjing in 1997, post-punk group P.K. 14 are regarded as the most important band in the development of Chinese experimental rock music. The band moved to Beijing in 2001 and released their first album 'Upstairs, Turn Left' the same year. P.K. 14's singer-songwriter Yang Haisong (杨海崧) has also produced many of the Chinese indie music scene's most celebrated albums (including Carsick Cars' 2007 eponymous debut album), working with independent record labels such as Maybe Mars and Modern Sky.

UnderBaby rose to fame underground in the mid-1990s, laying the foundation for Beijing punk music in the 1990s along with two garage bands, Flies and Catchers of the Rye. In 1996, UnderBaby's song "All the Same" - "All One Yang" was included in the Chinese indie rock album "China Fire II", thus gaining national recognition.

Since the early 2000s, Chinese indie music has grown considerably, with homegrown bands such as Carsick Cars, Birdstriking, Re-TROS, Brain Failure, Demerit, Tookoo, AV Okubo, Lonely Leary, Hang on the Box and Fanzui Xiangfa all embarking on international tours.

== Western classical music ==
Whereas orchestras organised by, run solely by and nearly always exclusive to the expatriate community in China are recorded from the early days of the International Settlement in Shanghai (i.e. 1850s) and a Russian orchestra was in operation in Harbin from the early 20th century, the beginnings of a unique classical music tradition in China lie with the first foreign trained Chinese conductor, Zheng Zhisheng AKA (romanized) Yin Zizhong. Zheng (Yin or Wan depending on romanization) was raised in China's Guangdong province. He was influenced by the Western Church Music at an early age. He studied in Lyons and Paris before returning to China in the 1930s. He became the first Chinese conductor of the Chongqing Symphonic Orchestra. Their performances included compositions from Beethoven and Mozart.

The revolutionary spirit of Yin Zizhong's (or romanized Wan-Chi Chung's) style has been continued by the first generation of composers immediately following the accession of the CCP to power, namely Li Delun and Cao Peng. The former provided the driving force and often the life force that kept a tradition alive through the Mao years, especially in his adopted city of Beijing, and the latter has been instrumental in maintaining a high standard of symphonic music, as well as working hard for the popularization of the tradition further into the fabric of Chinese culture, across his long career, which continues to the present. At the same time as this tradition has continued, new generations have sought to bring classical music in China along another path, away from the strict professionalism of the elite trained Li and Cao (who were both at the Russian conservatory in the 1950s) and towards a less nationalistic, but arguably more encompassing attitude towards the tradition. Most influential in this new movement has been the young Shanghai conductor Long Yu.

== Patriotic/revolutionary music ==
During the height of the Cultural Revolution, political music became the dominant form. Music accelerated at the political level into "revolutionary music" leaning toward cult status and becoming mainstream under the ideology of the Chinese Communist Party. Jiang Qing introduced the revolutionary model operas under her direct supervision; the eight Model Dramas (6 operas and 2 ballets) were promoted while traditional operas were banned. Notable examples are the operas The Legend of the Red Lantern and Taking Tiger Mountain by Strategy, and the ballet pieces Red Detachment of Women and The White Haired Girl. Other forms of musical composition and performance were greatly restricted. After the Cultural Revolution, musical institutions were reinstated and musical composition and performance revived.

Some of the more widely known political songs are Military Anthem of the People's Liberation Army, The East is Red, and the Internationale.

== See also ==
- List of traditional Chinese musical instruments
- History of Chinese dance
- Culture of China
- Music Bureau
- Music industry of East Asia
- The 'C-Rock' (Chinese rock) music scene
- Chinoiserie (music)
- World music

== Bibliography ==
- Van Aalst, J. A. (1884). Chinese Music. Cambridge University Press. ISBN 978-1-108-04564-3.
