= Kate Liao =

Chinese lyricist

Kate Liao (Chinese: 廖瑩如; Tongyong Pinyin: Liao Ying-ju) is a lyricist, record planning, and A&R production coordinator in the Chinese music industry. She was nominated for Best Lyricist in the 19th Golden Melody Awards for her work on Stefanie Sun's "Against the Light 逆光".

== Career ==
Liao grew up in the veteran's community in Nantou, and graduated with a degree in radiology from the Central Taiwan University of Science and Technology. After graduation, she worked as a radiologist in Kaohsiung for a short period of time. In her student life, she became interested in Taiwanese and Western pop music. Before completing her internship, she sent 21 pieces of lyrics to UFO Record. The pieces stood out because of her unique handwriting, and later became the start of her career in the music industry.

=== Development ===
Liao's first lyrics work was one from her student days; it was "Yang Guang Zhao Bu Dao De Jiao Luo 陽光照不到的角落" sung by Julie Sue, released in the album Follow Your Feeling 跟著感覺走 in 1988.

Upon graduation, she applied for the position of copywriter at UFO Records, and got selected by Lo-Jung Chen. This marks her official debut in the Taiwanese pop music industry. Her duties included copywriting, participating in the A&R of film soundtracks such as A Home Too Far and Island of Fire, and writing copies for Western music such as Madonna, U2, etc.

At the same time, she continued to compose lyrics, and also briefly cooperated with other record companies, such as the marketing and positioning of Tser-Bian Kang and Fang Ho. Later, her mentor Lo-Jung Chen invited her to join Warner Records, which was undergoing the acquisition of UFO Records at the time, where she began to serve as the Executive A&R Producer. Her work includes Jieling Ren, Elson Liu, Matilda Tao, Zhennan Tsai, Annie Yi, Sammi Cheng, Aaron Kwok, Stefanie Sun, and others. Liao designed the marketing strategy and the debut image and works of Stefanie Sun. Stefanie won the Best New Artist Award and was also nominated as the Best Mandarin Female Singer in the 12th Golden Melody Awards.

== Artistry ==
Liao worked in both major record labels at the time, UFO Records and Rock Records. She has collaborated with many different of singers covering a wide range of styles. Her lyrics are written in vernacular, casual language, while incorporating her own experiences or feelings that she can relate to. When writing, she would first settle on a theme, then develop the tone before working on the structure. Her lyrics don't often have clear descriptions about scenes, or specific people. That is to reserve some space for the listeners to relate the lyrics to their own stories.

It is common for Liao to use the "Ding-zhen writing style" — the use of the ending character from the last sentence as the beginning character in the next sentence. She also pays much attention to the singer's voice. An example can be seen in Stefanie Sun's "I Don’t Love 我不愛", the line "我想過要放棄自己，說放棄，要放哪裡", where the singer conveys a certain attitude.
