= Republican movement (Ireland) =

The republican movement refers to the Irish Republican Army (IRA) and other political, social and paramilitary organisations and movements associated with it. It can refer to:

- Republican Movement, which consisted of the IRA and Sinn Féin prior to 1969.
- Provisional Republican Movement or simply Republican Movement, which consisted of the Provisional IRA, Provisional Sinn Féin and other associated organisations.
- Official Republican Movement, which consisted of the Official IRA, Official Sinn Féin and other associated organisations.
- Irish Republican Socialist Movement, which consists of the Irish National Liberation Army and the Irish Republican Socialist Party.
- Dissident Republican Movement, which includes the Continuity IRA, Republican Sinn Féin, the Real IRA and 32 County Sovereignty Movement, and the New IRA.

The Dissident Republican Movement itself consists of multiple movements:

- Continuity Republican Movement, which consists of the Continuity IRA and Republican Sinn Féin.
- Real Republican Movement, which consisted of the Real IRA and 32 County Sovereignty Movement.

== Usage ==
The term has been in use from at least 1949 when Criostóir O'Neill, the vice president of Sinn Féin, gave a speech at Bodenstown Graveyard:

The Republican movement is divided into two main bodies – the Military and the Civil Arms, the Irish Republican Army and Sinn Féin. Each has an important task to do. In the final analysis the work of either is as important as that of the other.

J. Bowyer Bell, in The Secret Army, uses the term throughout to refer to the several organisations associated with the IRA in the 1960s and beyond. For instance, in chapter XVII he says: "But beneath the smooth patina applied by MacGiolla, The Republican movement seethed with bitter faction and the advanced rot of despair." Specifically mentioned in relation to this are Sinn Féin, Clan na Gael in America, the United Irishman and the National Graves Association. Martin Dillon writes the term includes the IRA, Sinn Féin, Na Fianna Éireann, and Cumann na mBan. Dillon and Peter Taylor state the term is used by members of the IRA to avoid making an incriminating statement, since membership of the IRA is illegal. A Sinn Féin 'members course' of around 1979 states: "Sinn Féin is the political section of the Republican Movement". Robert White states in the early 1980s Sinn Fein was the junior partner in the relationship with the IRA, and they were separate organisations despite there being some overlapping membership.

== See also ==
- Irish republicanism
- Irish Republican Army (disambiguation)
