= Gars =

Gars or GARS may refer to:

== Places ==
- Gars am Inn, a municipality Bavaria, Germany
  - Gars Abbey, a monastery founded in 768 in Gars am Inn
- Gars, Alpes-Maritimes, a commune in the Alpes-Maritimes department in southeastern France
- Gars am Kamp, a market town in the district of Horn in Lower Austria

== Other ==
- Glycine—tRNA ligase, an enzyme encoded by the GARS gene
- Global Area Reference System, a geospatial reference system for use across the US Department of Defense

== See also ==
- Gar (disambiguation)
