= Republican Army =

Republican Army can refer to:

- Irish Republican Army, a military organisation descended from the Irish Volunteers
- Baloch Republican Army, a Baloch nationalist guerrilla army in Balochistan
- Spanish Republican Army, the army of the Second Spanish Republic
- Philippine Revolutionary Army, later renamed Philippine Republican Army.

== See also ==
- Army of the Republic (disambiguation)
- Irish Republican Army (disambiguation)
