= Garre (disambiguation) =

Garre may refer to:

- Garre, a Somali pastoralist clan that live in Somalia, Kenya, and Ethiopia
- Nilda Garré (born 1945), a former leftist militant and former defense minister of Argentina
- Oscar Garré (born 1956), a former Argentine football defender
- Carl Garré (1857–1928), Swiss surgeon who discovered staphylococcus, Garrés disease and Garrés osteomyelitis

== See also ==
- Garr
- Gar (disambiguation)
