= Gar (name) =

Gar may be a clan name, given name and/or nickname.

== Tibetan clan name ==
The Gar, mGar or sGar clan has included the following people:

- Gar Tongtsen Yülsung (590–667), Tibetan Empire general and Great Minister
- Gar Tsenye Dompu (died 685), Tibetan Empire general, eldest son of Gar Tongtsen Yülsung
- Gar Trinring Tsendro (died 699), Tibetan Empire general, son of Gar Tongtsen Yülsung
- Gar Mangsham Sumnang, 7th century Tibetan Empire general and Great Minister

== Given name or nickname ==
- Gar Alperovitz (born 1936), American political economist and historian
- Gar Baxter (born c. 1929), Canadian former football player
- Gar Demo, (born c. 1969), Episcopal Priest and Minister
- Gar Forman, American National Basketball Association team executive
- Gar Anthony Haywood (born 1954), American author of crime fiction
- Gar Heard (born Garfield Heard, 1948), American retired National Basketball Association player and coach
- Garton Hone (1901–1991), Australian tennis and cricket player
- Gar Joseph, American journalist
- Gar Knutson, also known as Thomas Garfield (born 1956), Canadian politician and lawyer
- Edgar Martínez, American former baseball player
- Edgar Moon (1904–1976), Australian tennis player
- Gar Samuelson (1958–1999), former drummer for metal band Megadeth
- Gar Saxon, a fictional Star Wars character in the animated series Star Wars Rebels and Star Wars: The Clone Wars (2008 TV series)
- Gar Waddy (1879–1963), Australian cricketer
- Garfield Wood (1880–1971), American inventor, entrepreneur, motorboat builder, racer and world speed record holder
