= Yatong =

Tibetan pop singer

Yatong is a Tibetan pop singer from Kham, the eastern province of traditional Tibet, China. Yatong was born in Dege in Kham. He's is a well known singer in and is popular with Tibetans in Tibet as well as those who live in exile. Yatong's fame largely tibetan so little is known of him in the western world

Yatong is known to have been in trouble with Chinese authorities over some of his songs, which they interpreted to have had political overtones.

== See also ==
- Music of Tibet
- Music of China
