= The Army of the Republic =

Book by Stuart Archer Cohen

- Author: Stuart Archer Cohen
- Language: English
- Genre: Thriller
- Publisher: St. Martin's Press
- Publication place: United States
- Media type: Hardcover
- Pages: 432 (hardcover edition)
- ISBN: 978-0-312-38377-0
- OCLC: 213300983
- Dewey Decimal: 813/.54 22
- LC Class: PS3553.O4337 A89 2008

The Army of the Republic, by Stuart Archer Cohen, is a book is set in a near-future United States where economic collapse and a one-party "democracy" has spawned a violent backlash.

The book centers around Lando, a Seattle urban guerrilla devoted to violent resistance, Emily, a political organizer in Seattle, and James Sands, a billionaire and government crony. Against this backdrop of mass politics and corporate armies, though, the book can be seen as an allegorical tale about a family at war with itself, too obsessed with status or with redemption to notice the abyss they're heading for.

Cohen draws heavily on his knowledge of South American revolutionary movements such as the Montoneros and the People's Revolutionary Army groups active in the 1970s. The book explores the full spectrum of citizen power, ranging from established methods such as ballot initiatives to civil disobedience to violent rebellion, carefully tracking the results of each method, and how they interact. The book also features two major demonstrations, the first of which was based on the 1999 WTO protests that became known as The Battle of Seattle.

Critics have called the book "brilliant, terrifying... too close for comfort" and "Thomas Paine meets Rage Against the Machine"
