= Nantou =

Nantou may refer to:

- Nantou County (南投縣), a county in central Taiwan (Republic of China)
- Nantou City (南投市), seat of Nantou County, Taiwan
- Nantou (historical town) (南头), a historic town and former administrative center of Xin'an County, in Nanshan, Shenzhen, China
- Nantou, Zhongshan (南头镇), town under the jurisdiction of Zhongshan, Guangdong Province, China
