= Grand Army of the Republic (disambiguation) =

The Grand Army of the Republic was an organization for veterans of the Union Army of the American Civil War.

Grand Army of the Republic may also refer to:

- The United States Army, sometimes called the Grand Army of the Republic
- Grand Army of the Republic (Star Wars), a fictional military force composed of clone troopers.

== See also ==
- Grand Army of the Republic Highway, an American road, a.k.a. US Route 6
- Army of the Republic (disambiguation)
