= Irish Republican Army (disambiguation) =

The Irish Republican Army is any of several armed movements dedicated to Irish republicanism.

Irish Republican Army may also refer to:

- Irish Republican Army (1919–1922), the original organisation, who fought in the Irish War of Independence and were recognised as the official army of the Irish Republic
- Irish Republican Army (1922–1969), the faction of the "Old IRA" who opposed the Anglo-Irish Treaty after the war
- Irish Republican Army, or Official Irish Republican Army, one faction of the IRA following a split in 1969, active until 1973
- Irish Republican Army, or Provisional Irish Republican Army, the other faction of the IRA following the 1969 split, active until 2005
- Irish Republican Army, or Continuity Irish Republican Army, which emerged from a split in the Provisional IRA over abstentionism, active since 1986.
- Irish Republican Army, or Real Irish Republican Army, which emerged from a split in the Provisional IRA over the 1997 ceasefire, active since that time

== See also ==
- Republican Army (disambiguation)
