= GARR =

Italian national computer network for universities and research

Gruppo per l'Ar
- Formation: 2001
- Legal status: Association
- Headquarters: Rome, Italy
- Region served: Italy
- President: Sauro Longhi
- Main organ: General Assembly
- Website: www.garr.it/en/

GARR (Gruppo per l'Armonizzazione delle Reti della Ricerca) is the Italian national computer network for universities and research. The main objective of GARR is to design and manage a very high-performance network infrastructure that delivers advanced services to the Italian academic and scientific community. The GARR network is connected to other national research and education networks in Europe and the world, is an integral part of the global Internet, and thereby promotes the exchange and collaboration between researchers, teachers, and students worldwide.

== History ==
The GARR network originates from the wish to unify and harmonise the previously existing different data networks of research centers and universities. The first single network was built in 1991, thanks to the efforts of the Group for Harmonisation of Research Networks (GARR), which was created in the late 1980s to represent the world of research organizations and universities. The current network is designed and managed by Consortium GARR, an association incorporated in 2001 under the auspices of the Ministry of Education, Universities and Research, whose founders are CNR, ENEA, INFN and the CRUI (Conference of Rectors of Italian Universities) Foundation as the representative of all Italian universities. Consortium GARR has its headquarters in Rome in the street where the headquarters of CASPUR (the Interuniversity Consortium for the Application of Supercomputers by Universities and Research) and the NaMex Internet exchange point are also located, as well as one of the major nodes of the GARR network.

GARR-T (acronym for GARR-Terabyte) is a network of 20,000 km of optical fiber that connects 80 nodes at a speed that varies on the backbone from a minimum of 100 GB to a maximum of 20 terabytes, increased compared to the maximum limit of 3 terabytes which was in force until 2021.

== The GARR network ==
The GARR network connects more than 450 locations throughout the country and has more than two million teachers, students and researchers as its users. All areas of education and research are represented. In particular, GARR connects:

- 145 research centres and laboratories of CNR, ENEA, INGV, INFN and ASI;
- 90 universities and 34 institutes for higher education in the arts and music;
- 45 hospitals and institutes for scientific care;
- 26 national and university libraries and other documentation centres;
- 17 INAF observatories and astrophysics centres;
- 91 other research and education institutions of international importance located in Italy.

The network extends over the country with more than 50 points of presence and is based on a fibre-optic infrastructure with a capacity of 20 Gbit/s. The interconnection with the Internet is achieved by multiple 100 Gbit/s connections to the GÉANT network (which is managed by the company DANTE, of which Consortium GARR is a shareholder) and 2.5 Gbit/s connections to the commercial operators Level 3 Communications and Cogent, as well as various links to different regional networks. Peering is mainly done at the Internet exchange points MIX (200 Gbit/s), NaMeX (100 Gbit/s), TOP-IX (2 Gbit/s) and VSIX (1 Gbit/s), which are located in Milan, Rome, Turin, Florence and Padua, respectively. The next-generation GARR-X network has a backbone and user connections that are mostly based on a fibre-optic infrastructure lit and managed by GARR itself. The entire GARR network provides both IPv4 and IPv6.

== Services for users ==
GARR offers its user community a range of services with a high innovation level. Some of these services are related to the operations and use of the network, while others are application services for end-users.

- GARR Vconf is a videoconferencing service that allows to connect up to 40 locations simultaneously. GARR Vconf is a free service for all users in the Italian academic and research community.
- GARR IDEM AAI is the Authentication and authorization infrastructure that simplifies access to online resources through the use of a standard authentication procedure. The federated identity approach allows users from organisations that are part of IDEM to use their home credentials also when accessing resources of other organisations.
- eduroam is a service that allows access to wireless networks in the university and research environment in the entire world without requesting specific credentials from the host organisation. eduroam is a registered trademark of TERENA, which coordinates the worldwide deployment. It is based on a federated approach and is widely deployed in Europe, North America and parts of the Asia-Pacific region, Latin America and Africa.
- GARR NRENUM VOIP - in the context of IP telephony, GARR administers the Italian number block +39 as part of TERENA's ENUM service NRENum.net in the research network environment, and advises on and directs the implementation of Voice over IP.
- GARR-NOC is the Network Operations Center responsible for the management and operations of the network infrastructure. Its activities include fault management, link activation and the collection and publication of traffic data statistics. For this purpose, GARR has created the GARR Integrated Network Suite that is able to monitor the performance of the network at every level of the infrastructure in real time, simplifying troubleshooting and enabling interoperability with other systems.
- GARR-LIR and GARR-NIC are services for the registration of .it and .eu domain names and for the assignment and management of IP addresses.
- GARR-CERT is a CSIRT with the task of assisting GARR users in the field of computer security, managing risks and preventing incidents.
- GARR-SCARR is a new service to perform vulnerability tests on the machines of the GARR network by making a series of repeated scans on request.
- GARR-CA is a Certificatie Authority service that issues and server certificates as part of the TERENA Certificate Service. The use of digital certificates is required to sign and encrypt documents and to protect and certify the authenticity of sites.
- GARR MIRROR is a service for the distribution of the most used open source software available on the Internet. The archive of the GARR ftp-mirror has a 120 terabytes of pre-RAID capacity.
- GARR USENET NEWS provides the Italian feed and part of the international feed of Usenet news to managers of local news servers.
