= Gar Joseph =

American journalist

- Occupation: Journalist
- Notable credit: Philadelphia Daily News

Gar Joseph (died August 10, 2019) was a prominent journalist in Pennsylvania, USA, working for the Philadelphia Daily News. Joseph had been city editor of the Daily News since December 2005.

In 2005, he was named one of "Pennsylvania's Most Influential Reporters" by the Pennsylvania political news website PoliticsPA. In 2006, his column on politics, "Clout", was named "best newspaper column" in Philadelphia magazine's annual "Best of Philly" issue. Joseph edited the 2009 series Tainted Justice by Wendy Ruderman and Barbara Laker, which won the 2010 Pulitzer Prize for Investigative Reporting.
