= Yin Zizhong =

Chinese musician

- Born: 1909
- Died: May 10, 1985 (aged 81–82); Boston, Massachusetts, United States
- Occupations: Musician, Composer, Violinist

Yin Zizhong (Chinese: 尹自重; pinyin: Yǐn Zìzhòng; 1909 – May 10, 1985), also transliterated as Che Chung Wan, Wan-Chi Chung, Zheng Zhisheng, was a popular Chinese musician during the New Culture Movement of the 1910s and 1920s in China.

== Career ==
He was raised in China's Guangdong province and was affected by Western Church Music from an early age – Yin began performing at age 11, and went abroad to study in Lyons and Paris. At age 20, he was invited to New Zealand to play; he also played in London, England. He returned to China in the 1930s and introduced Western Music to China as the first Chinese conductor of a Chinese orchestra, when he became employed by Chongqing Symphonic Orchestra. At this Orchestra; where previously performances were given of Beethoven and Mozart, attendance, organization and management was exclusive to and solely performed by the expatriate community in China, since as far back as the 1850s. A Russian orchestra was in operation in nearby Harbin from the early 20th century.

During his employment as a conductor at the Chongqing Symphonic Orchestra, Yin has been credited as a major contributor to the creation of a "Guangdong" style of playing the violin in Chinese opera, a method still used today. Some of the works he is known for are "Magnolia Pearl", "Huazhou Hero", and "Overturned the Child".

From the 1930s to 1960s, he was a composer for Hong Kong cinema. He was also an actor for the films "Wealth Is Like a Dream "(1948), "Bitter Sweet" (1936), and "A Blooming Rose" (1935). The revolutionary spirit of Yin's style has been continued by the first generation of composers immediately following the accession of the Chinese Communist Party to power, namely Li Delun and Cao Peng. During this time he was regarded as one of the most popular performers of this age. In 1952, he stopped working in cinema in Hong Kong, and in 1957 he emigrated to San Francisco and taught music there for eight years. Later, he was invited to Boston to teach in the Chinese Music Society. When he arrived in San Francisco in 1963, he received the key to San Francisco from the mayor at the time (George Christopher).

He died on May 10, 1985, in Boston and is currently buried in Forest Hills Cemetery.
