= Glutathione amide reductase =

Identifiers
- EC no.: 1.8.1.16

Databases
- IntEnz: IntEnz view
- BRENDA: BRENDA entry
- ExPASy: NiceZyme view
- KEGG: KEGG entry
- MetaCyc: metabolic pathway
- PRIAM: profile
- PDB structures: RCSB PDB PDBe PDBsum
Search
- PMC: articles
- PubMed: articles
- NCBI: proteins

Glutathione amide reductase (EC 1.8.1.16, GAR) is an enzyme with systematic name glutathione amide:NAD^{+} oxidoreductase. This enzyme catalyses the following chemical reaction

glutathione amide disulfide
+ NADH
H^{+}
H^{+}
2
glutathione amide
+ NAD^{+}

The three substrates of this enzyme are glutathione amide disulfide, reduced nicotinamide adenine dinucleotide (NADH), and a proton. Its products are glutathione amide and oxidised NAD^{+}. Glutathione amide reductase is a dimeric flavoprotein (FAD).
