= Music industry of East Asia =

The music industry of East Asia, a region that includes Mainland China, Hong Kong, Macau, Japan, Mongolia, North Korea, South Korea and Taiwan is a rapidly growing economic sector that is home to some of the world's largest music markets.

== Milestones ==
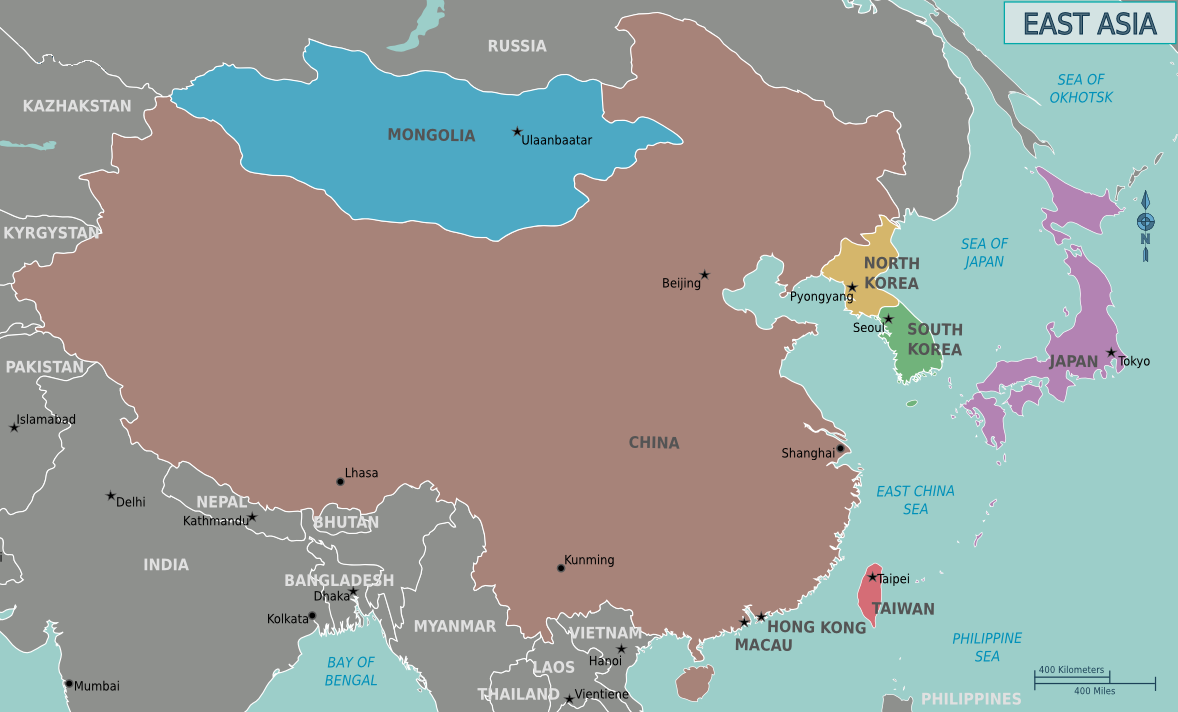
Modern East Asia

In 2003, South Korea became the world's first music market where digital music sales surpassed those of physical formats.

In 2012, Japan surpassed the United States as the world's largest recorded music market for the first time, according to the International Federation of the Phonographic Industry. Though the U.S. remained the largest if licensing fees are included into the figures. However, in the following year, Japan fell back to the second-largest music market after experiencing a 16.7 per cent decrease due to the country's reliance of CDs and slow adoption of digital services.

In 2019, there were 750 million digital music users in China. It was also estimated that its digital music market hit a yearly revenue of approximately 13.2 billion yuan in 2020. China is expected to become one of the largest music markets in the world by 2020.

== Contrast with the global music industry ==
Although global physical music sales (such as CDs) have been declining in recent years, in East Asia (particularly Japan and South Korea), however, physical music sales have been rising consistently.

The International Federation of the Phonographic Industry credits this phenomenon to "K-Pop fans who want high-quality physical formats and deluxe box sets".

According to a music executive from Universal Music Group, CDs are becoming "the new merchandise in Asia".

== Controversy ==
Several controversies have arrived based on the way the industry has been treating its artists.

=== Control of artists personal lives ===
It is not uncommon for record labels to prohibit their pop artists from dating for a certain period of time or for as long as they have a contract with the company. In Japan managers may attempt to discourage their artists from dating or engaging in behavior that may tarnish their images by keeping a busy schedule and only letting artists know about their schedules a day at a time. Artists who break this contract, as in the case of Minami Minegishi from AKB48, run the risk of getting dropped from their music group or contract.

Korea has similar rules for musical pop artists. Artists have more freedom to date and get married, however managers have strong control over their personal lives and behaviors. In Taiwan, artists are also expected to behave in certain ways, as they cannot discuss taboo topics such as politics.

== Ranking ==
The following table lists the largest music markets of East Asia:

Rank	Country
1	Japan
2	China (PRC)
3	South Korea
4	Taiwan
5	Hong Kong

Notes

- The ranking is based on IFPI Global Music Report 2022. Since IFPI does not release the data below the top 20 since 2011, the rank for Taiwan and Hong Kong is based on the 2010 report.

== See also ==
- Music of Asia
  - C-pop
    - Mandopop
    - Cantopop
    - Hokkien pop
  - J-pop
  - K-pop
    - Korean hip hop
    - Korean rock
    - T'ong guitar
    - Trot
