= Stuart Archer Cohen =

American author and businessman

- Born: October 29, 1958 (age 67); Cincinnati, Ohio, U.S.
- Education: Walnut Hills High School; Johns Hopkins University; Columbia University
- Occupation: Novelist
- Children: two sons
- Writing career
- Notable works: The Army of the Republic (2008), Invisible World (1998), 17 Stone Angels (2003)
- Website: www.stuartarchercohen.com

Stuart Archer Cohen (born October 29, 1958) is an American author and businessman who has written four works of fiction: Invisible World, 17 Stone Angels, The Army of the Republic, and This Is How It Really Sounds. He lives in Juneau, Alaska with his wife and two sons.

== Early life ==
Stuart Archer Cohen was born in Cincinnati, Ohio in 1958 and graduated from Walnut Hills High School in 1976. He spent a year hitchhiking around the United States, hopping freight trains and traveling with a circus as a prop man, then attended Johns Hopkins University and Columbia University, where he won the Bennet Cerf Prize for fiction. He produced a hybrid advertising/theater piece called MediaWave, then left for Alaska upon finishing in 1981. He wasn't given his diploma due to having failed physical education.

== Writing career ==
Cohen began traveling to South America in 1984 and began an import company. On a trip to Inner Mongolia in 1992 he began writing a short story about going to Inner Mongolia in the dead of winter, which became Invisible World (Reganbooks, 1998) a novel translated into 6 languages. Much of the book was written in hotel rooms in China and South America, and is about antique textiles, smuggling, and the invisible world of the imagination, memory and the future, a world that often overwhelms the book's characters.

On the publication of Invisible World, encouraged by two-book contracts in the United States and Germany, Cohen closed his store to devote himself to writing. He spent three years writing The Book of Rumor, a novel set in Juneau, Alaska, about a long-ago mine strike, a homeless Tlingit man, and strange messages that appear in the newspaper attacking the leading citizen of the town. Neither publisher accepted the book.

Facing an increasingly dire financial situation, Cohen went to Buenos Aires to research petty criminals and corrupt police, and quickly wrote 17 Stone Angels, (Orion, 2003) about a corrupt police chief in Buenos Aires who is assigned to investigate a murder he committed. Published as The Stone Angels, the book was translated into 9 languages and optioned by Paramount Studios.

In 2008, Cohen published The Army of the Republic (St. Martins, 2008), a novel about insurgency set in the United States.

In April 2015, Cohen published his fourth novel This Is How It Really Sounds (St. Martin's Press), a novel about skiing, rock 'n roll, malignant high finance, espionage, and three men who share the same name. http://stuartarchercohen.com/books/this-is-how-it-really-sounds/

== Works ==
Novels

- Invisible World (1998)
- 17 Stone Angels (2003)
- The Army of the Republic (2008)
- This Is How It Really Sounds (2015)
