= Bagh-e Gar =

Bagh-e Gar باغ گر
- Village
- Location within Iran
- Coordinates: 28°20′40″N 53°45′48″E
- Country: Iran
- Province: Fars
- County: Jahrom
- Bakhsh: Central
- Rural District: Jolgah

Population (2006)
  - Total: 185
- Time zone: UTC+3:30 (IRST)
  - Summer (DST): UTC+4:30 (IRDT)

Bagh-e Gar (Persian: باغ گر, also Romanized as Bāgh-e Gar; also known as Gar) is a village in Jolgah Rural District, in the Central District of Jahrom County, Fars province, Iran. At the 2006 census, its population was 185, in 44 families.
