= Georgia Radio Reading Service =

Radio reading service in Georgia, United States

The Georgia Radio Reading Service or GARRS is a radio reading service for the blind in the U.S. state of Georgia. It is carried via subcarrier on WABE-FM in Atlanta, and on Georgia Public Broadcasting radio stations elsewhere. A narrator reads local and regional newspapers, including the Atlanta Journal-Constitution.
