= Gar (music) =

Gar (Tibetan: གར་; Chinese: 嘎尔; pinyin: gā'ěr or 卡尔; pinyin: kǎ'ěr) is a genre of Tibetan court music. A related genre of court music with accompanying dance is called garlu (Tibetan: གར་གླུ་; Chinese: gā'ěrlǔ, 嘎尔鲁).

Gongyun Yuewu《供云乐舞》(Gongyun Music and Dance, 1985) is an important compilation of Tibetan court music and dance that includes all 58 court pieces and their corresponding Tibetan lyrics.

The two genres are believed to have spread to Lhasa from Baltistan and Ladakh during the 17th century, during which time both of these areas were under significant Mughal influence.
