= Chinese rock =

Music genre

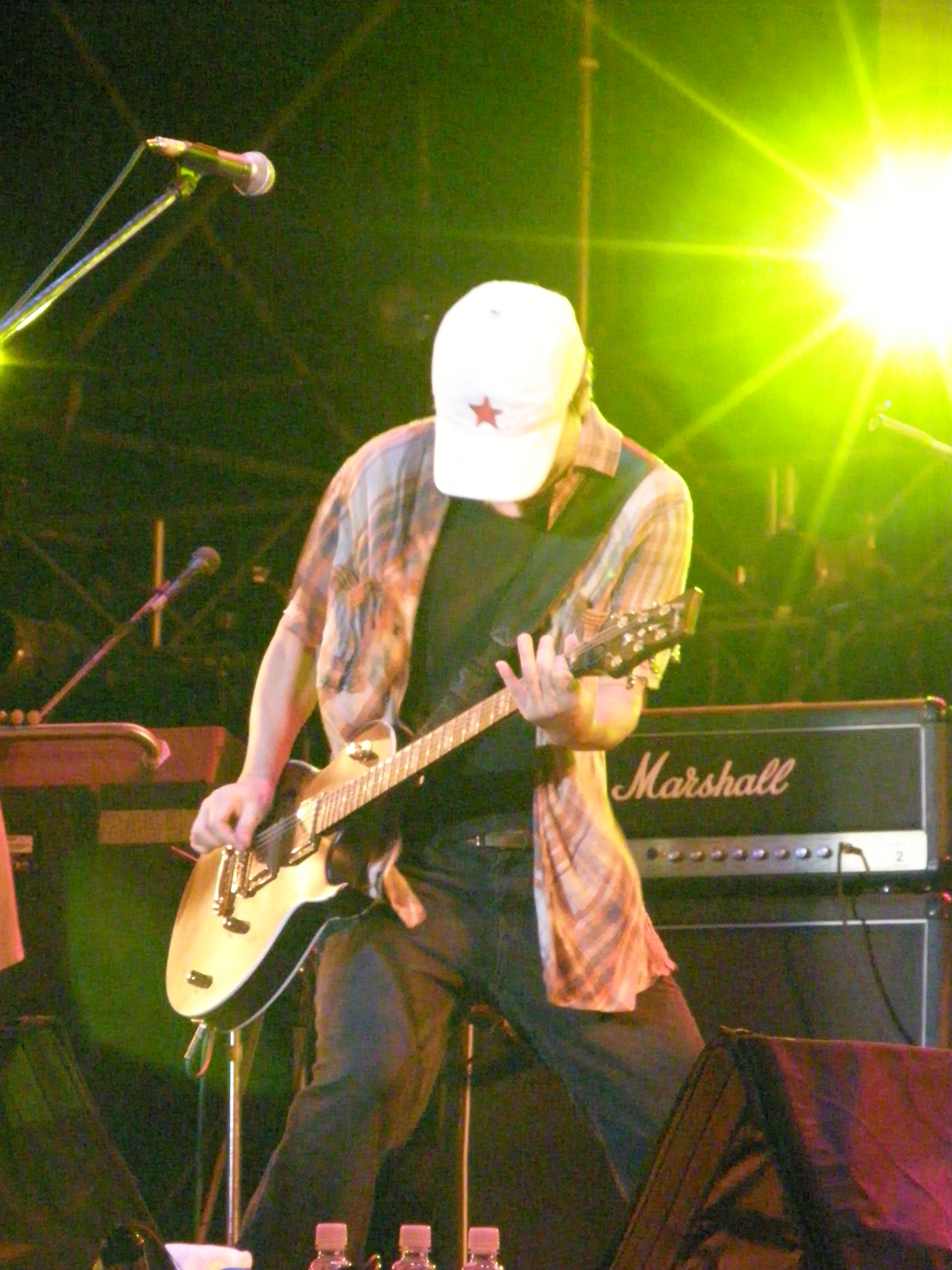
Cui Jian, considered a pioneer of Chinese rock music.

Chinese rock (Chinese: 中国摇滚; pinyin: Zhōngguó yáogǔn; also simplified Chinese: 中国摇滚音乐; traditional Chinese: 中國搖滾音樂; pinyin: Zhōngguó yáogǔn yīnyuè, lit. "Chinese rock and roll music") is a wide variety of rock and roll music made by rock bands and solo artists from Mainland China (other regions such as Taiwan, Hong Kong, Macau are considered separate scenes). Rock music as an independent music genre first appeared in China in the 1980s, during the age of New Enlightenment. Typically, Chinese rock is described as an anti-traditional instrument, a music that defies mainstream ideology, commercial establishment, and cultural hegemony. Chinese rock is a fusion of forms integrating Western popular music and traditional Chinese music.

== History ==
=== The Northwest Wind (1980s) ===
The birth of Chinese rock was a rather unique phenomenon. The Asian country had closed its borders and didn't allow anything Western that might cause disunity or cultural confusion to enter, so the government only promoted art with communist aims. They didn't want anything Western within their walls, much less a musical genre like rock. The high command believed that this genre had an anti-revolutionary character that could easily infect the Chinese masses. A clear example is the Soviet Union, where a Chinese politician mentioned that the end of the USSR came "when children started listening to rock."

The dakou was one of the main causes of the yaogun phenomenon. Because the practice went beyond its literal meaning of "cutting" or "tearing," young people found a form of mental escape through their ingenuity. At that time, China had a kind of vast continental landfill, where a lot of waste was transported, including music cassettes. Many people who worked in these garbage dumps salvaged tapes that had been discarded by Western countries because they were damaged. Many Chinese saw this as an opportunity, so some skilled young people, rebuilt the audio tapes so they would work again and then sold them on the underground circuit or simply listened to them with friends.

Despite the entry of some films and their positive reception among young people, the Chinese communist government completely stigmatized Western music, especially rock, because they knew it was the sound of rebellion in the West. This stigma was partly due to a rather curious incident: a young rocker wanted to assassinate Mao Zhedong.

In the early 1970s, Lin Liguo, nicknamed "the Tiger" (son of Lin Biao, a military officer and one of Mao's main collaborators), planned to kill the founder of the People's Republic of China because of the discontent and oppression his family suffered at the hands of Mao. He even once said, "One day I will let the Chinese people know that there is such wonderful music in the world!" His plan was later discovered, and he and his father fled to the USSR, but two hours later, their plane crashed, and they were burned to death. Thanks to their vision of rock and this precedent, they had logical reasons to prohibit the genre, or at least censor it.

Rock music did not take hold in Mainland China until the end of the Cultural Revolution and the onset of the Reform and Opening. Peking All-Stars were a rock band formed in Beijing in 1979, by foreigners then resident in the Chinese capital. While the first rock band in China, they were not Chinese. The following year, Wan Xing, Li Shichao, Ma Xiaoyi, and Wang Xinbo formed their first rock band, Wanli Ma Wang, at Beijing Second Foreign Languages College (now Beijing Foreign Studies University), playing Western classic rock.

Chinese rock had its origins in Northwest Wind style of music, which emerged as a main genre in Mainland China. The new style was triggered by two new songs, "Xintianyou" (《信天游》) and "Nothing To My Name" (《一无所有》), both of which drew heavily on the folk song traditions of northern Shaanxi. They combined this with a western-style fast tempo, strong beat and aggressive bass lines. In contrast to the contemporary mellow cantopop style, Northwest Wind songs were sung loudly and forcefully. It represented the musical branch of the large-scale root-seeking (寻根, xungen) cultural movement that also manifested itself in literature and in film. Cui Jian's Northwest Wind album Rock 'N' Roll on the New Long March, which included "Nothing To My Name", has been called "China's first rock album".

Many Northwest Wind songs were highly idealistic and heavily political, parodying or alluding to the revolutionary songs of the Chinese Communist Party (CCP), such as "Nanniwan" and "The Internationale". It is associated with a non-Communist national music perspective instead of CCP revolutionary fervor. The music reflected disillusionment among Chinese youth, as well as the growing influence of Western concepts such as individuality and self-empowerment. Both the music and lyrics articulated a sense of pride in the independence and power of the northwest's peasantry. Songs such as "Sister Go Boldly Forward" (《妹妹你大胆的往前走》) came to represent an earthy, virile masculine (Yang) image of Mainland China, as opposed to the soft (Yin), civilized, polished urban gangtai Hong Kong style.

=== Birth of Chinese rock and roll (1984) ===
The birthplace of Chinese rock was the city of Beijing. In the nation's capital, rock music was highly politicized and open to a wide range of foreign influences. For most of the 1980s, rock music existed on the margins, represented by live performances in small bars and hotels. The music was almost exclusively the domain of university students and "underground" bohemian intelligentsia circles. By the late 1989 and early 1990 Chinese rock partially emerged into mainstream music as a combination of the growing popularity of Northwest Wind and prison song fads.

The first Chinese rock song was arguably the Northwest Wind anthem "Nothing To My Name", first performed in 1984 by Cui Jian, widely recognized as the father of Chinese rock. The song introduced into post-revolutionary China a whole new ethos that combined individualism, direct and bold expression. It soon came to symbolize the frustration harbored by a disillusioned generation of young intellectuals who had grown cynical about Communism and critical of China's the sterility and hypocrisy in traditional and contemporary culture. It also expressed, even for older Chinese, a dissatisfaction with unrealized promises of the CCP.At that time, the media introduced and evaluated Cui Jian in such a voice: "Rock music precisely meets the emotional needs of a generation of young people like him, and rock music has become another form of" social criticism ".".

In the spring of 1989, "Nothing To My Name" became the de facto anthem of the student protestors at Tiananmen Square. Additionally, in May and July of that year, three of China's famous rock bands were established: Breathing (Huxi, 呼吸), Cobra (眼镜蛇), and Zang Tianshuo's (臧天朔) 1989. Earlier rock music groups include "Infallible" (Budaoweng 不倒翁), formed by Zang Tianshuo and Tang Dynasty (Tang Chao, 唐朝) lead vocalist and rhythm guitarist Ding Wu (丁武), and probably the most famous of all Chinese rock bands: "Black Panther" (Hei Bao 黑豹), originally fronted by China's alternative music pioneer Dou Wei (窦唯).

=== Prison songs (1988–1989) ===
"Prison songs" (《囚歌》) became popular in 1988 and early 1989, parallel to the Northwest Wind style. The fad was initiated by Chi Zhiqiang (迟志强), who wrote lyrics about his time in jail and set them to folk melodies from northeast China. In contrast to Northwest Wind songs, prison songs were slow, "weepy" and invoked negative role models, often using vulgar language and expressing despair and cynicism. Their non-conformist values are apparent in such songs as "Mother Is Very Muddle-Headed" and "There Is Not a Drop of Oil in the Dish". The popularity of these songs reflected the fact that many Chinese during the 1980s became tired of official artistic representations and discourse. The patrons of prison songs were the urban youth, and private entrepreneurs, who at that time were mostly from marginal backgrounds.

=== Popular Chinese rock (1990–1993) ===
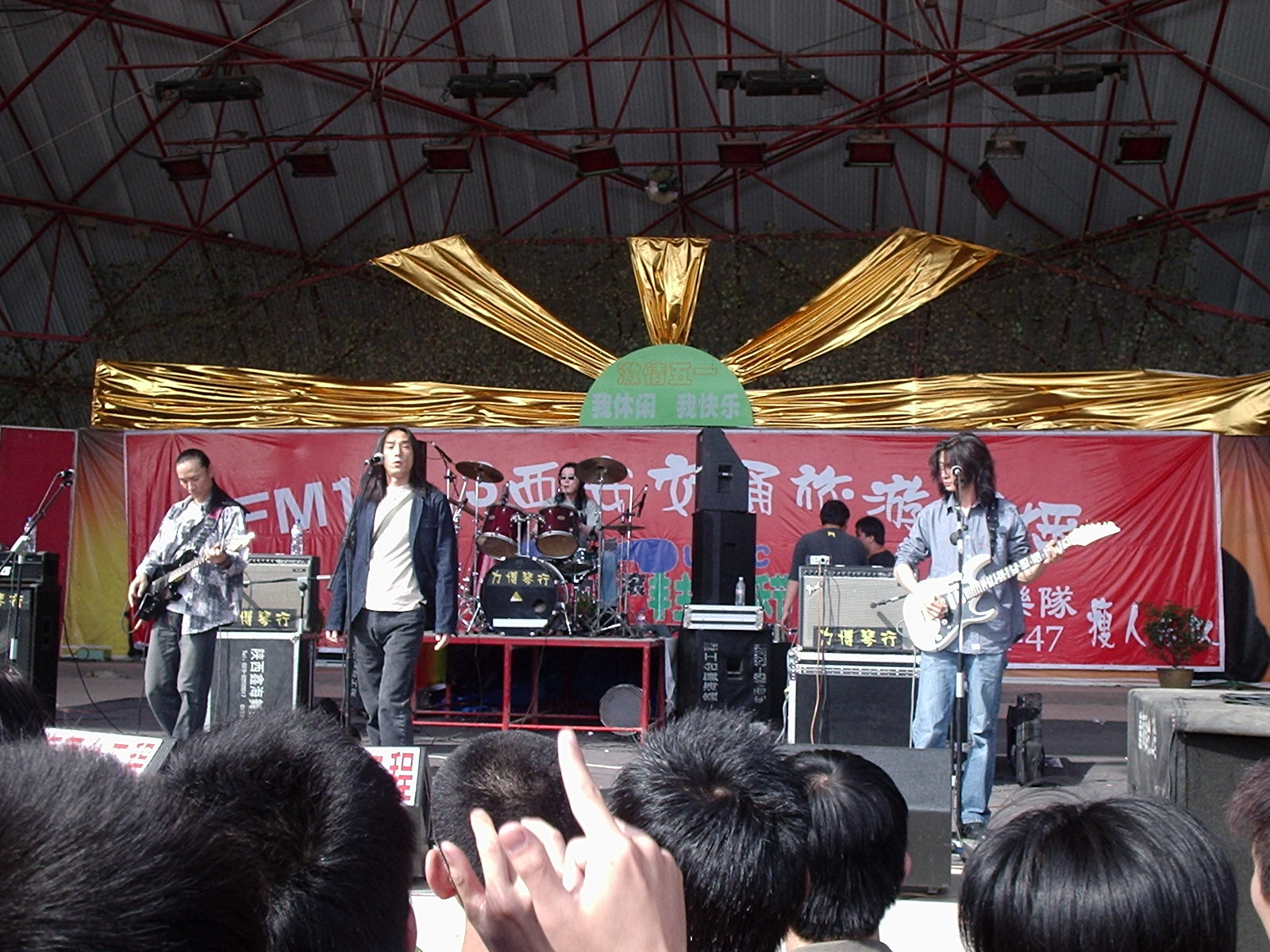
Tang Dynasty performing in 2004.

After the Tiananmen Square protests, rock became part of general urban youth Chinese culture. At the same time, the central authorities of the CCP immediately adopted a crackdown, banning the performance and dissemination of rock music. Its rise from the margins was celebrated on 17 and 18 February 1990, when Beijing's largest ever all-rock concert was held in the Capital Gymnasium, one of the city's largest halls. The concert featured six rock bands, among them are Cui Jian's ADO and Tang Dynasty. The criterion that the organizers set as qualification to participate was "originality".

Chinese rock reached a peak of creativity and popularity between 1990 and 1993. In 1991, the glam metal band Black Panther released their self-titled debut album. With glossy production and hard rock melodies backing the sincere voice of lead singer Dou Wei, it featured hit singles such as "Don't Break My Heart and "Ashamed". A year later, the album went on to sell more than 1,000,000 copies nationwide, a standard never before achieved in Chinese rock history. Another band, Tang Dynasty, whose style was comparable to British heavy metal, successfully broke another barrier. Their singles "9/4 (a reference to the song's time signature)", "The Sun", and "Choice" climbed the charts. Once again, it was not until 1992, that their debut A Dream Return to Tang Dynasty sold over 2,000,000 copies throughout Asia, including Japan, Korea, and the Southeast. From there, other previously formed rock bands, such as the first all female band, Cobra, and hard rockers The Face (each established in 1989), achieved greater success than ever. In addition, dozens of newer bands formed during the peak of their success, and rock music was performed on a regular basis. Big name artists and bands were featured in media such as CCTV and MTV, while other lesser known acts made a presence in small-scale, underground rock parties such as band leader Fa Zi who was perhaps the most well-known musician at art colony Yuan Ming Yuan near Bei Da in Beijing before it was closed down. The core participants in rock subculture adopted characteristic nonconformist appearance and behaviour. These included glam rock styles: pretty face, long hair, jeans, silver metal ornaments, black leather coats, as well as emerging grunge styles: flannel shirts, and do it yourself ethics, coupled with a carefree, hippie-style behaviour. The decline of Northwest Wind and simultaneous rise of rock music represented a shift in the attitude of many of China's intellectuals. Nostalgia changed into an unequivocally fierce negation, a sense of alienation from China's traditional and rural culture.In 1993, the Southern Music Group organized the "Music Commune" in Guangzhou to hold a concert "Remembrance of the Year Like Water".This is the first time Southern rock music has surfaced on a large scale.In the same year, a large-scale rock concert "Olympics - China Dream" was held at the Capital Gymnasium.

=== Rock goes underground, earns newfound respect (1994-1998) ===
By 1994, mainstream popularity of Chinese rock slowly began to ebb, due in no small part to strict censorship by the CCP, such as the banning of rock from television and restrictions on performances. Moreover, the decline of rock reflected a decline of public interest in politicised cultural products, thoughts, or behaviors. People became increasingly motivated to engage with the market economy, to make money and improve their living standard. Cross-border cultural exchange facilitated by increased economic openness, and the radical commercialization of the music industry in the mid-1990s led to importing overseas music, particularly from Taiwan and Hong Kong. Cantopop singers such as Andy Lau were sponsored by well-resourced record companies and derived revenues from film-making and advertising, two sources generally rejected by Chinese rock musicians. Moreover, the level of censorship imposed on c-pop was less strict, since gangtai culture is historically separate from mainland culture.

With the tragedy of Nirvana frontman Kurt Cobain's death in 1994, a new underground movement emerged in popular music. That year, former Black Panther frontman Dou Wei released Dark Dreams. This album marked a complete departure from his "glam metal" days. Instead, this album emphasized thicker and more jangly guitars. Dou sang in a thin, almost apathetic drone-like voice and began experimenting with gothic and electronic sounds. This innovative direction earned him a whole new kind of reputation, as well as credibility in the alternative culture movement. Another unlikely figure in the scene was the father of Chinese rock himself, Cui Jian. A rare compilation album, titled "Rock Pioneers" was also released. The album showcased raw, rather unorthodox playing styles, as well as a rejection (even sometimes a mockery) of mainstream rock music. With the exception of Dream, the only band on the compilation to achieve mainstream success was Thin Man, who went on to revitalize the popularity of rock back for "the masses." Self-styled punk He Yong fiercely resisted cantopop imitators on the mainland. His only album, Garbage Dump, was embraced by alienated Chinese youth, and earned him an enormous cult following. In 1995, a handful of younger punk bands (Brain Failure, Reflector, A Jerks, and 69) produced an album called "Wuliao Contingent," (无聊军队, alternate translation "Battalion of Boredom") representing the boredom and frustration collectively felt within the urban landscape. Chinese punks resist the mainstream by adhering to their own cultural lifestyle and being willing to challenge state power directly on stage or organizing performances focused on sensitive topics to oppose the Chinese government. At the forefront was Brain Failure, the most successful of these bands, who continue to tour internationally with their ska/punk sound. English is used to both express what Chinese lyrics cannot, and also to crossover to the Western music market. In 1998 Hang on the Box were formed, the first all-girl Chinese punk band. One of the significant turning points for rock was Cui Jian's performance with The Rolling Stones in 2003 at the age of 42. It opened the genre to the rest of the world for the first time.

In December 1994, Dou Wei, Zhang Chu, He Yong and Tang Dynasty participated in the concert held at Hung Hom Stadium in Hong Kong. This is considered an important concert in the history of Chinese rock music, filled with media from all over the world and nearly 10,000 Hong Kong audiences.

In November 1994, the band "43 Baojia Street" was established at the Central Conservatory of Music, with Wang Feng as the lead vocalist. No. 43 Baojia Street was a famous academic band, with many members being highly talented students from the Central Conservatory of Music, each with their own understanding and persistence in music. In 1995, Wang Feng formed "43 Baojia Street" as the soul vocalist. His first album, 43 Baojia Street, was released in 1997. In 1998, he released his second album, Storm Comes. In 2000, the band disbanded, and that same year Wang Feng released the album "Flower Fire". In 2002, he released his album Love is a Bullet for Happiness. In 2004, he released the album "Smiling and Crying". In 2005, the album "Raging Life" was released.

=== Rock Revival (2000–present) ===
From 2000 to 2004 post punk and extreme metal entered the underground scene and gained popularity among fans. China made tremendous efforts during a brief and extraordinary period to make its "rock history" possible: this can be attributed to the great prosperity of the local heavy metal industry in the early 2000s, when many new brands such as Areadeath emerged, Mort Production and later Polywater, Stress Hormones et al., along with the integration of foreigners, have brought some research techniques to Chinese rock. In 2004–2005, Beijing's Joyside went on their first tour of China. American filmmaker Kevin Fritz followed them to make the film "Wasted Orient." It was released on DVD in 2007 by Plexifilm. The film is China's version of Decline Of Western Civilization (about the LA punk scene). It comically depicts the pitfalls associated with trying to tour a country that has little taste for Chinese rock n' roll music. In this film the original line-up of Joyside including Bian Yuan, Liu Hao, Fan Bo, Yang Yang, and Xin Shuang shows these colorful characters drowning away in alcohol. The film also includes some of Joyside's early music, which brought the band some public recognition. The film "Wasted Orient" is non-political, and avoids making superficial social commentary. While Joyside is not particularly known for the talent, the film presents Chinese rock music in the new millennium in a most authentic, raw, and genuine musical genre..

Director Kevin Fritz:

The film Wasted Orient is what it is pure and simple. It's honest. It is the true way of Chinese rock n' roll. It's not glamorous. It's filthy. It's filled with despair. It's very unwanted in that society and is shown in its citizens' apathetic response to it

Presently, Chinese rock enjoys a new media forum in the popular Chinese television program, the "Pepsi Battle of the Bands" (百事群音) a weekly live program featuring top 10 Rock bands from all over China who compete for weekly survival. Each Episode features guest Celebrities such as, Cui Jian, Paul Wong, Richie Jen, Wang Feng, Van Fan, Jolin Tsai, Mayday, and Show Lo to name a few. The show is sponsored by Pepsi, and produced by Ato Ato Integrated Media.

=== The Beijing Midi Modern School of Music and Music Festival ===
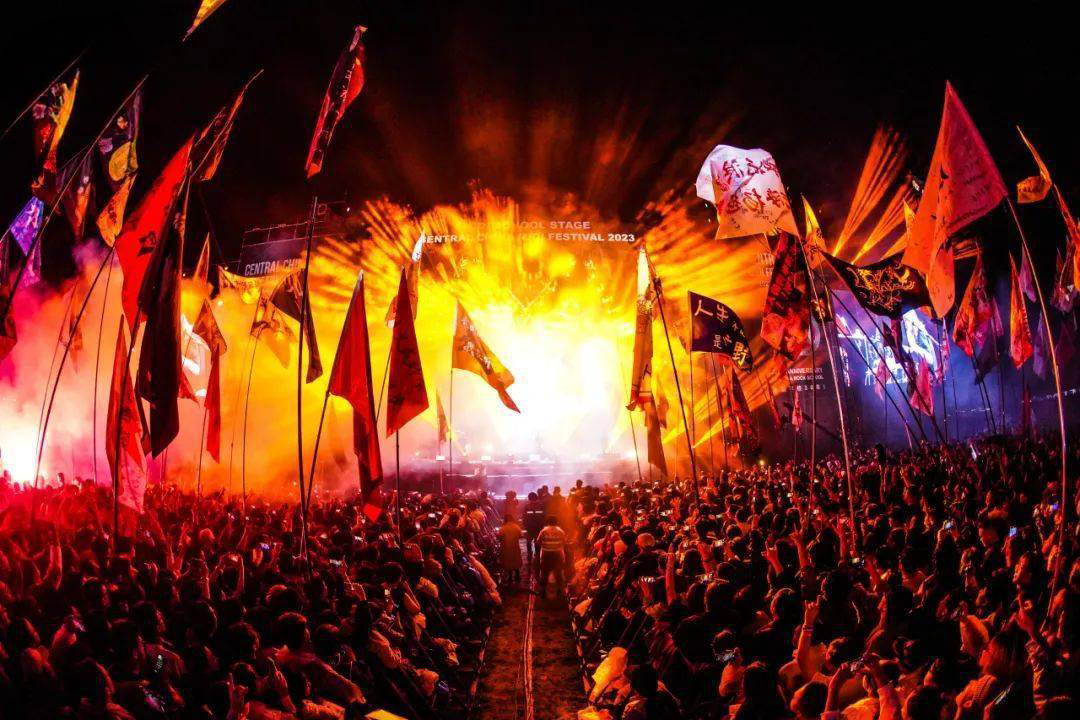
The 2023 Midi Music Festival

Another important step in the development of Chinese rock music had been the Beijing Midi School of Music in Beijing.Rock and roll youth have become a small and permanent fixed group in urban youth culture in China. Despite facing opposition from mainstream culture, Chinese rock has successfully survived and continues to attract loyal audiences today. Although its exposure is not as high as pop music, in the past two decades, it has begun to move away from the margins of society and has made reasonable progress in gaining more and more organized followers. The establishment of Beijing Midi Music Academy in 1993 can be an important milestone. Beijing Midi Music School is the first modern music school in China approved by the Beijing Haidian District Board of Education. Established 1993 by Zhang Fan, it was the first school nationally to offer classes for jazz music and rock music. When the school was established in early 1993, it established a clear purpose of running the school: to spread the theory of modern music of the arts and humanities, and to educate and promote exquisite modern music interpretation techniques. Modern music covers blues, jazz, rock, pop, Latin, country, funk, and various genres of music developed from the beginning of the last century, as well as various styles of music derived from them.Started as a school festival in 1999, the Midi Modern Music Festival advanced to the largest rock music festival nationally with up to 80000 visitors and over 100 bands. Both the school and the festival supported the underground scene across the country and opened the door for over 18 foreign bands in 2006 to perform at the festival and elsewhere in the country. (i.e. Alev, Monokino, Yokohama Music Association, The Wombats, etc.). Every year, dozens of world-renowned bands are invited to perform, and tens of thousands of passionate fans flock from all over the world. More than a hundred well-known media outlets are paying attention to its dynamics and competing to report on related news. Midi, also known as China's "Woodstock“.

In addition to the Midi school, the Painkiller heavy music magazine started efforts to bring bands such as Edguy, Lacrimosa and Hatesphere to China and organized tours of the country for them. Especially in the metal and gothic genres these tours are considered milestones in China.

=== The 2008 Olympics and the Sichuan earthquake ===
A major drawback for the music scene in general was the cancellation of several events leading up to the 2008 Olympic Games, as well as the 2008 Sichuan earthquake. The 2008 Midi Modern Music Festival was cancelled and delayed to October 2008, the Soilwork gig had to be cancelled, as the band did not receive their visas and the German Esplanade in Chongqing was stopped by the organizers.

The Sichuan earthquake in general shook the music scene and spawned dozens of "We are together" and "Think of Sichuan" gigs and charity events throughout Beijing and other cities. London Chinese Radio made a Special Earthquake Edition on their New Sounds of China podcast to cover this.

=== The Shanghai Scene ===
Historically more open to the outside, Shanghai is home to musicians from around the world. The unofficial home of the local jazz scene is JZ club while DJs and Electronic Producers frequently play The Shelter. Underground rock bands converge at Yuyintang. The 2010 World Expo and auxiliary events brought legal limitations to live performances and dried up venues temporarily, even censoring Shanghainese indie rock band Top Floor Circus. But since late 2010, Shanghai has seen a surge in concert goers, bands and live music venues with websites, blogs and independent record labels in English and Chinese dedicated to promoting concerts and artists. With Shanghai being the home of the most creative young talents, high school students also became well-involved in the city's rock scene. From 2010 to 2014, BRR Shanghai High School Music Festival held by The BRR Shanghai High School Music League (a coalition of the best high school musicians in Shanghai founded by Xu Qifei) grew increasingly influential and started the trend of high school music festivals in Shanghai.

== Artists ==
=== Solo ===
- Cui Jian
- Dou Wei
- He Yong
- Henry Zhou
- Luo Qi
- Nicholas Tse
- Leehom Wang
- Pu Shu
- Wang Feng
- Wang Lei
- Wang Yong
- Xie Tianxiao
- Xu Wei
- Zhang Chu
- Zang Tianshuo
- Zheng Jun
- Zuoxiao Zuzhou

=== Bands ===
- Angry Jerks
- Ashura ("阿修羅" Axiuluo)
- Again ("轮回" Lunhui)
- AK-47
- Anodize
- Baboo
- Barque of Dante但丁之舟
- Bearbiscuit
- Beyond
- Black Box
- Boys Climbing Ropes
- Buyi ("布衣乐队" Buyi)
- Black Panther ("黑豹" Heibao)
- Brain Failure ("腦濁" Naozhuo)
- Carsick Cars
- Cavesluts
- CLIMAX
- Cobra ("眼镜蛇" Yanjingshe)
- Cold Blooded Animal ("冷血动物" Lengxuedongwu)
- Cold Fairyland ("冷酷仙境" Lengkuxianjing)
- Demerit
- Dream Rush
- Duck Fight Goose
- Dzap Dau Dau
- Fall Insects ("秋天的虫子" Qiutiandechongzi)
- The Flowers ("花儿乐队" Hua'eryuedui)
- The Frogs ("青蛙乐队" Qingwa Yuedui)
- Fa Zi ("法兹" Faziyuedui)
- FulushouFloruitShow ("福禄寿" FulushouFloruitShow)
- 43 Baojia Street ("鲍家街43号" Baojiajie43Hao)
- Gemini ("简迷离" Jiǎnmílí)
- Gong Gong Gong ("工工工")
- Hang On The Box ("挂在盒子上" Guazaihezishang)
- Happy Avenue ("幸福大街" Xingfudaijie)
- Hammered
- Hedgehog
- Hutong Fist ("胡同拳头" Hutongquantou)
- Iron Joker ("艾侬乔克")
- Infinite Sound ("无限音" Wuxianyin)
- Joyside
- Lazy Mutha Fucka
- Left and Right ("左右" Zuoyou)
- LGF (Little Green Frog)
- Liquid Oxygen Can ("液氧罐头乐队" Yangqiguantouyuedui)
- Lonely China Day
- Mortal Fools
- MUMA
- New Pants ("新裤子" Xinkuzi)
- Nine Treasures ("九宝")
- Omnipotent Youth Society ("万能青年旅店" Wannengqingnianlvdian)
- Overload ("超载" Chaozai)
- Pairs
- Punk God ("盘古", Pangu)
- Ping Pung
- P.K. 14
- Proximity Butterfly ("变色蝴蝶" Biansehudian)
- Queen Sea Big Shark ("后海大鲨鱼" Houhaidashayu)
- Re-TROS ("重塑雕像的权利" Chongsudiaoxiangdequanli)
- Escape Plan ("逃跑计划" Taopaojihua)
- Rainbow Danger Club
- RayE
- Reflector ("反光镜" Fanguangjing)
- Ruins ("废墟" Feixu)
- SCAR UNDER YOUR MASK
- Second Hand Rose ("二手玫瑰" Ershou Meigui)
- Sick Larvae ("病蛹" Bingyong)
- Silver Ash ("银色灰尘" Yinse Huichen)
- Snapline
- SMZB ("生命之饼" Shengming Zhi Bing)
- Sober ("清醒" qīngxǐng)
- SUBS
- Suffocated ("窒息" Zhixi)
- Spring and Autumn ("春秋" Chunqiu)
- Supermarket ("超级市场" Chaojishichang)
- SuperVC
- Tang Dynasty ("唐朝" Tang Chao)
- The Catcher in the Rye ("麦田守望者" Maitianshouwangzhe)
- The Samans ("萨满" Saman)
- The Last Successor ("末裔" Mòyì)
- The Wild Cooperative ("野外合作社" yěwàihézuòshè)
- The Wynners
- Total Maverick Decadence (TMD)
- Tomahawk ("战斧" Zhanfu)
- Twisted Machine ("扭曲的机器" Niuqudejiqi)
- Varihnaz
- Wasted Laika
- What? ("什么" Shenme)
- Wild Children ("野孩子" Yehaizi)
- Wood Pushing Melon ("木推瓜" Mutuigua)
- Wu Tiao Ren ("五条人")
- Yao ("妖" Yao)
- Yaksa ("夜叉" Yecha)
- YuFeiMen ("与非门" Yefeimen)
- Zen
- Ziyue ("子曰" Ziyue)
- Zuriaake ("葬尸湖" Zangshihu)

== Websites ==
=== Rock in China ===
The Rock in China website was founded by Yu Yang. It began in April 2004 as a subsection of Painkiller titled "Metal in China" before being migrated to its own domain name in mid-2005. Focused on Chinese rock, it had a bulletin board system, a wiki, album details, and musician biographies. According to G1, it was "among the largest websites dedicated to promoting Chinese rock groups abroad". The Insider's Guide to Beijing 2005–2006 called it "a hugely informative site", while Beijing Review's Fu Mao Gou said it was "the most comprehensive Web portal there is on Chinese rock". The website operated until at least July 2010.

== See also ==
- Midi Modern Music Festival
- Beijing Pop Festival
- Modern Sky Festival
- C-pop
- Cantopop
- Chinese heavy metal
- Mandopop
- Taiwanese rock
