= Chinese heavy metal =

Chinese music genre

Chinese heavy metal (中国重金属, pinyin: Zhōngguó Zhòngjīnshǔ; also 中国重金属音乐, Zhōngguó zhòngjīnshǔ yīnyuè, literally "Chinese heavy metal music") is commonly used to describe a wide variety of forms of heavy metal music, in connection with the rock bands and solo artists from the People's Republic of China (Native Chinese-speaking regions such as Taiwan, Hong Kong, Macau are considered separate scenes). Typically, Chinese heavy metal bands adhere to one subgenre of heavy metal such as death metal, thrash metal, or power metal, but usually having Chinese lyrical content rather than English.

== History ==
=== Tang Dynasty (1988–1990) ===
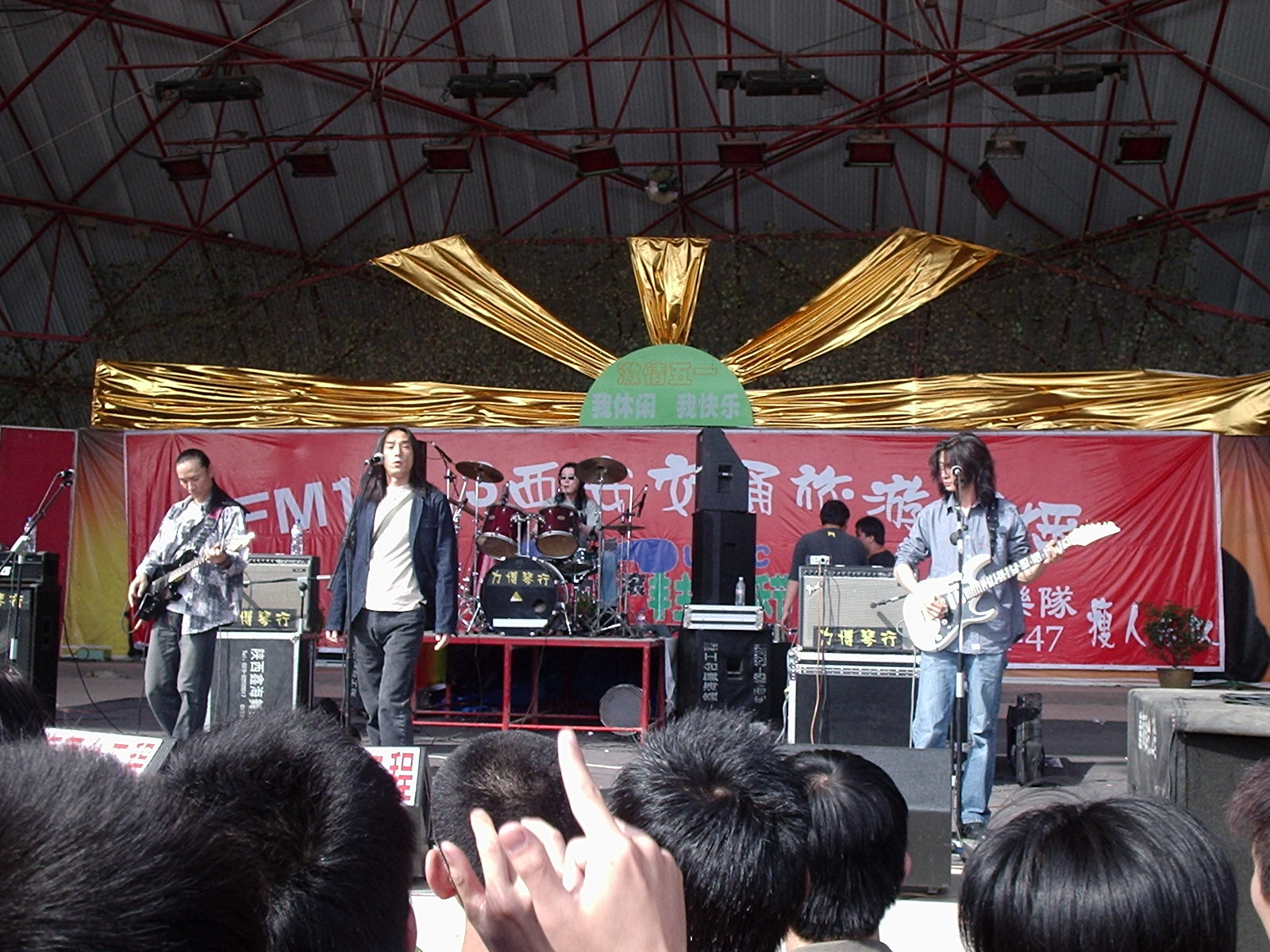
Tang Dynasty performing in 2004.

Chinese heavy metal had its origins in hard rock (硬摇滚音乐, Yìng yáogǔn yīnyuè) and Heavy Metal (重金属, Zhòngjīnshǔ) music genres, which had emerged and gained popularity around the 1980s in the western world. The genre of Chinese Heavy Metal music emerged with the formation of the Chinese band, Tang Dynasty as they were the first band to emerge in China with Heavy Metal oriented music. Following their formation in 1988 Tang Dynasty utilized both elements introduced in the new wave of British heavy metal as well as elements of classical Chinese music in the music they wrote. In 1990 Tang dynasty was hired to play at the, 'Festival of modern music / 90's Modern Music Concert', where they were met with extremely positive responses from the crowd of nearly 18,000 spectators.

The success gained from their performance eventually led to them obtaining a record contract with the Taiwanese record label, Magic Stone. In December 1992 Tang Dynasty released their debut album, titled A Dream Return to Tang Dynasty, marking the first release of a heavy metal album in China by a Chinese band.

=== Development (1991–1999) ===
In the time following the initial success of 'Tang Dynasty' a number of other Chinese heavy metal bands began to emerge throughout China. The bands emerging during this time period gradually began to adopt a 'heavier' style of music utilizing more western elements in to their music, shown by the band Overload's thrash metal debut record in 1996, but retaining the Chinese lyrical content.

1997–1999 saw a massive rise in the amount of metal bands in China as the amount of new metal bands being formed every year increased from roughly 1-2 to 15 by 1999. The new bands being formed also began to diversify in terms of musical subgenre of heavy metal as many bands began to explore a more Extreme Metal sound rather than the traditional '80's metal sound'. In 1999, the first metal magazine "极端音乐(Extreme Music)" was founded in Nanjing. Extreme Music Magazine articles feature metal bands and metal culture especially underground metal bands. Extreme Music moved to Beijing in 2006.

=== Public Recognition (2000–2012) ===
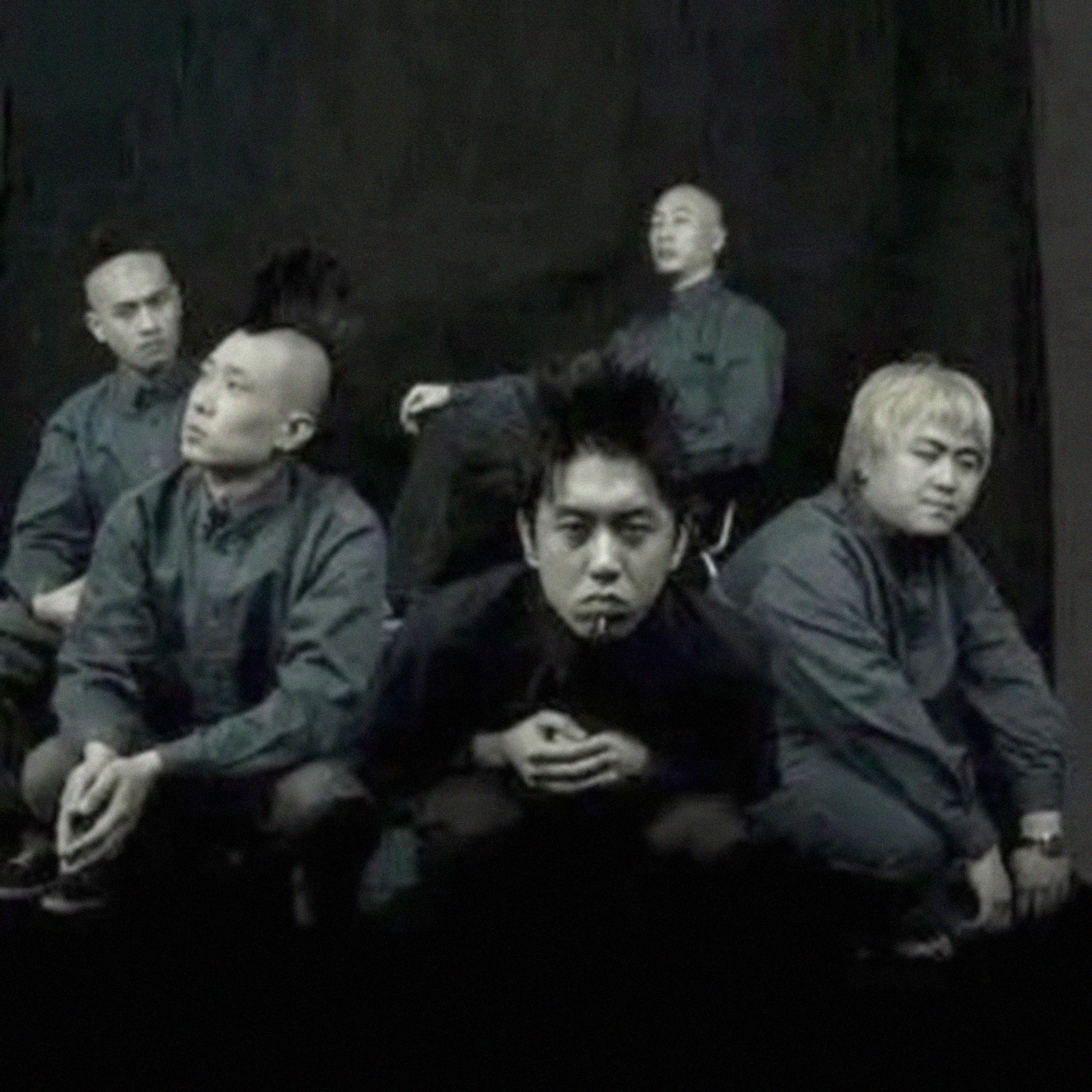
核聚变 (Nuclear Fusion)

In September 2000, the first heavy-metal-oriented magazine, Painkiller, was founded in Beijing. The magazine quickly became popular within the heavy metal subculture in China on account of both its local coverage of metal related subjects as well as due to the inclusion of interview and articles written by foreign correspondents.

During June 2001, the record label "Mort Productions" is founded by some of the members involved in the production and release of the Painkiller. On November 4 Mort productions released the first compilation CD of Chinese heavy metal, "Resurrection Of The Gods" Mort Productions would go on to release a variety of records by Chinese metal bands as well as several metal compilation albums.

From the year 2005 and onward, China began to have several high-profile metal concerts with foreign bands headlining, along with local Chinese bands supporting. The band Labyrinth's performance in Beijing marked the first official metal concert in China by a foreign band.

In the following years several foreign bands such as: Edguy, Lacrimosa, Testament, Exodus, In Flames, Nightwish, Dark Tranquility, Dream Theater, Stratovarius, Helloween, Opeth, Lamb Of God, Soulfly, Cannibal Corpse, Iron Maiden have all performed in both Beijing and Shanghai.

2012 marked to be a major statement of recognition for the Chinese metal scene, with several metal bands such as Suffocated being filmed by CCTV 5 and broadcast along the European Championship in Soccer 2012 coverage. Furthermore, the website Rock in China released the compilation record CORE IN CHINA that attracted global attention online and is regarded as a milestone for Chinese metal. In August, three Chinese metal bands (Suffocated, Yaksa and The Falling) performed on the Wacken Open Air 2012.

== Artists ==
- Tang Dynasty
- Black Panther
- Overload
- Yaksa
- Zuriaake
- The Samans
- Nine Treasures
- Tengger Cavalry

== See also ==
- Midi Modern Music Festival
- Chinese rock
- Rock in China
