= FloruitShow =

Chinese indie band

- Origin: Beijing, China
- Genres: fusion music; world music; classical crossover; synthpop; electropop; folk; rock
- Years active: 2018–
- Label: Pollux Music
- Members: Du Bing'er (杜冰儿); Du Xue'er (杜雪儿); Du Fei'er (杜飞儿)

FloruitShow (Chinese: 福禄寿) are a Chinese indie band formed in Beijing in 2018. The band consists of three sisters – Du Bing'er (杜冰儿), Du Xue'er (杜雪儿), and Du Fei'er (杜飞儿) – whose nicknames (and present stage names) are DouDou (豆豆), NieNie (捏捏) and MiMi (咪咪) respectively. They all graduated from the Central Conservatory of Music in Beijing, where DouDou and MiMi majored in composition and NieNie majored in harp. The band signed with Pollux Music (北河三), a world music and fusion music label affiliated with ModernSky (摩登天空), after releasing its third single "Him" (马; 'horse') online. They won the DoMeSo Music Competition 2019 with the song "Set Me Free" (超度我). After their 2020 appearance on The Big Band 2, a Chinese music show, they gained popularity amongst young people in China, and they launched their first nationwide tour at the end of 2020.

== History and development ==
Du Bing'er, Du Xue'er, and Du Fei'er are triplets, born in Guangzhou on 10 December 1991. They were born in a cold winter; "bing (冰)", "xue (雪)", and "fei (飞)" mean "ice", "snow" and "flying". They started to learn piano under the instruction of their maternal grandfather. At the age of 10, Bing'er and Fei'er began to learn composition under professor Xu Zhitong; at the same time, Xue'er started learning to play the harp.

The sisters were admitted to the Central Conservatory of Music in 2010. They appeared on several TV shows in the name of "BingXueFei Group", and released a six-track album in 2014. Several years later, they concluded that these attempts had been unsuccessful, and they did not want to be a pop idol group.

In 2017, Xue'er received a master's degree from the Central Conservatory of Music and became a harpist in a Beijing orchestra, Bing'er began to teach composition in a music school, and Fei'er joined a musical production team. Unhappy about being separated, they decided to write and sing their own songs of doubt, emotion, and reflection. After six months, they released "What Can I Hold You With" (我用什么把你留住) on NetEase Cloud Music Platform.

While the name "Fulushou" was originally a joke, they soon decided that it aligned with their vision. The name "Floruit Show" is a transliteration of the Chinese band name.

The CEO of Pollux Music, Miao Yunyi, signed them to the label after seeing the title of "Set Me Free" and listening to their hitherto-released discography.

In 2019, a remixed version of FloruitShow's first single "What Can I Hold You With" was included in the Modern Sky 9 album. In August of the same year, the band performed their songs "What Can I Hold You With" and "Him" on a live house's stage for the first time. They won the DoMeSo Music Competition 2019, earning a chance to collaborate with American musicians at the end of the year.

In the first half of 2020, many music festivals in mainland China were cancelled due to the COVID-19 pandemic; FloruitShow performed at several online music festivals during this time. In the summer of 2020, the band competed in an online music live show The Big Band 2 (乐队的夏天 2), making it to that year's Hot 10 bands; during recording and broadcasting, the band's performance and past releases caused controversy amongst Chinese netizens. Still, their official Weibo account attracted more than 130,000 followers by the end of 2020. After the first episode of The Big Band 2 was released online on 5 July, several Chinese newspapers and media platforms, including the China Daily, the Ifeng Weekly, the Paper, Dongqimen, and the HNA Group's High Above Magazine, interviewed the sisters. They were also invited to pose for some fashion magazines, such as Fashion Cosmopolitan and Vogue Me.

The band's first nationwide tour, What Can I Hold You With, started in November 2020 in Nanjing. The tour was scheduled to cover Beijing, Guangzhou, Shenzhen, Chengdu and four other cities in China. The Beijing session, however, was cancelled due to the COVID-19 pandemic. The band's first album, What Can I Hold You With, was released in January 2021; it includes the eponymous track "What Can I Hold You With", as well as "Him", "Yuzhen", "Mei Lo" and six other songs. The album's artwork, designed by the MVM design label, contains the band's logo "three wise monkeys" and portraits of the sisters.

== Techniques and composition ==
In the beginning, the sisters did not think of FloruitShow as a band, preferring to call themselves a "group" on the basis that a band should consist of at least one drummer, one guitarist and one bassist, whereas none of them plays bass.

In her master's dissertation, Du Xue'er introduced and analyzed the music work Jing Ke, which was composed by her sisters Bing'er and Fei'er. Jing Ke was an ancient Chinese hero who aimed to kill the King of Qin, so as to protect other countries from being invaded and destroyed by Qin. But in the end, Jing Ke failed to complete his mission, and lost his life in Qin's palace. The triplet sisters told this story using the harp, and in the process, employed some unique harp techniques to mimic the sounds of guqin, Chinese drum, guzheng and gong. Some of these techniques were heavily used in their adaptation of the Chinese pop song "Juvenile", and in the rearranged version of their own song "Mei Lo" in collaboration with Chinese pianist Li Yundi.

Besides traditional harp and electric harp, the band uses small instruments such as ōryōki, sleigh bell, recorder and the Indian drum. Since all three members are classically trained, their style is sometimes classified as fusion music, world music or classical crossover.

== Lyrical themes ==
Chinese singer Wang Feng once commented in his blog: "FloruitShow's songs always contain deep reflections on life and indomitable spirit towards this fickle world... It's very precious that a creator and expresser could be thinking about the more profound spiritual life all the time, embodying the invisible rumination process in their works and describing a rich imaginary world in simple language." Music critic Ear God, who has more than 14,000,000 followers on Weibo, said that "FloruitShow's music expresses a sophisticated view towards life and death beyond their age. The atmosphere and images of death that don't belong to people of their age enveloped their songs... The more complex and the deeper a piece, the more consistent it is with their temperament." FloruitShow said in an interview that they started to think about the topic of death after they attended their maternal grandmother's funeral and became frustrated hearing "Auld Lang Syne", feeling it to be out of place in such a sad atmosphere. They felt death should be treated seriously and with respect, though the topic is usually avoided in Chinese culture.

In their debut song "What Can I Hold You With", FulushowFloruitShow expressed a bittersweet feeling towards life; although we can enjoy its splendor, we also have to endure its perishing; they said that when they were students they had to spend all their time studying, and when they finally slowed down afterwards, they found a chance to contemplate what the meaning of life was.

"Mei Lo" was written to encourage listeners; this song depicts a man finding that the things he once cherished have disappeared, leaving him alone to go through his life. The story was reportedly inspired by literature such as the Cthulhu Mythos and films like Ghost in the Shell and AKIRA. The band performed an adapted version with pianist Li Yundi in 2020, and it sparked controversy among Chinese music critics and netizens. Some felt that their arrangement was too complicated, while others argued that Chinese music needs bands that can produce such complexity. Wang Feng criticized their performance for being too technical and too experimental. However, Ear God commented that "their rearranged song sounded just like a cyber sacrifice full of Kawai Kenji's flavour...which shows that the triplet sisters have a sophisticated view of life and death that don't belong to the people of their age".

Religious elements are common in their songs. In "Set Me Free", they cited several paragraphs directly from the Diamond Sutra, including the famous four-line gatha:

一切有为法
All conditioned phenomena
如梦幻泡影
Are like a dream, an illusion, a bubble, a shadow,
如雾亦如电
Like dew or a flash of lightning;
应作如是观 Thus we shall perceive them.

In the ending of this song, they added a twist to the lyrics by embedding four lines of soft vocals into the background: "my obsessions are countless. I can't let go of the earth; I can't let go of the heaven. I folded and cut the red thread, falling into the mortal world for reunion". In another song "Drolma" (兰若度母), they depicted a scene in which Lanre Tara descends into this world to dispel a disease from an ancient village. In this song's lyrics, they included a magic spell which is specifically for dispelling disease in Buddhist culture. Core concepts in Buddhism such as "karma", "chao du (超度)" and "nirvana" are also frequently seen in their music.

== Discography ==
- What Can I Hold You With (2021)

== Concert tours ==
- What Can I Hold You With (2020)

== See also ==
- C-pop
- Chinese rock
- Independent music
- Mandopop
- Midi Modern Music Festival
- Modern Sky Festival
