= A Story About Fire =

2025 animated film by Li Wenyu

- Chinese: 燃比娃
- Literal meaning: Burning Baby
- Hanyu Pinyin: Ran Bi Wa
- Directed by: Li Wenyu
- Screenplay by: Li Wenyu
- Based on: Qiang folk religion
- Produced by: Chen Bo; Wang Anyi; Su Donghai
- Starring: Yang Haoyu; Zhou Xun; Bei Yile; Kang Chunlei
- Edited by: Li Wenyu
- Music by: Zhang Quan
- Production company: Shanghai Animation Film Studio
- Distributed by: Shanghai Film Group
- Release dates: 18 February 2025 (Berlinale); 28 April 2026 (China)
- Running time: 85 minutes
- Country: China
- Language: Mandarin

A Story About Fire (Chinese: 燃比娃; pinyin: Ránbǐwá; lit. 'Burning Baby') is a 2025 Chinese animated fantasy film written and directed by Li Wenyu. It is based on Qiang folk religion about Ranbiwa stealing fire for humanity. Shanghai Animation Film Studio animated the film on Xuan paper and it is distributed by the Shanghai Film Group.

== Plot ==
Awubaji, the chief of a tribe, went to a mountain to bring fire back to humanity. She dies after bringing back Ranbiwa, a monkey. Ranbiwa grows up and is sent to the mountain with a wolf. They traverse the dangers of the mountain before finding fire in a cave. The wolf sacrifices itself to save Ranbiwa from a monster. Ranbiwa, who has been losing his fur, rises from ashes and becomes human.

== Cast ==
- Yang Haoyu as adult Ranbiwa
- Zhou Xun as Awubaji
- Bei Yile as young Ranbiwa
- Kang Chunlei as the wolf

== Production ==
A Story About Fire is based on stories from Qiang folk religion. Li Wenyu first heard of the Qiang story of Ranbiwa in 2018. Ranbiwa, who resembles a monkey, is the son of the god of fire and a human chief and brings fire to humanity after stealing it from the gods. Li conducted research of cultural relics at museums and went to the Ngawa Tibetan and Qiang Autonomous Prefecture. Research trips were also conducted by the production to Wenchuan, Mao, and Li counties.

Li started work on the film and presented an image and a simple text description at the Nanjing International Animation Festival Project Market in 2019. Su Da and Chen Bo, the director and deputy director of Shanghai Animation Film Studio, selected Li's project out of 30 submissions.

Production took five to six years. A grant was given to the production by Shanghai Cultural Development Foundation in 2022. This was the first animated film Li directed and he also wrote and edited it. A Story About Fire is the first animated film hand-painted on Xuan paper and more than 50,000 sheets of rice paper were used. Qiang embroidery art, which Li discovered during his research, was also used.

The band 野孩子乐队 (Wild Children) created the soundtrack over the course of two years. The band travelled to a Qiang village to collect music and instruments. 荒唐谣 (Absurd Ballad), a promotional song, was created by DouDou.

== Release ==
An incomplete version was shown at the work in progress section of the 2024 Annecy International Animation Film Festival. A Story About Fire premiered at the 75th Berlin International Film Festival on 18 February 2025. It was the third time that a film by the Shanghai Animation Film Studio was shown at Berlinale, after Three Monks in 1982, and The Fight Between the Snipe and the Clam in 1984. Shanghai Film Group theatrically released the film in China on 28 April 2026. Global sales were managed by Parallax Films.

The China Film Pavilion (CFCC) at the 2026 Cannes Film Festival showed A Story About Fire, Shanghai Wonton, and It's OK on 13 May, and the CFCC later screened A Story About Fire at the École Supérieure de Réalisation Audiovisuelle on 16 May. A Story About Fire was shown at the São Paulo International Film Festival, Asia Pacific Screen Awards, Melbourne International Film Festival, Raindance Film Festival, Shanghai International Film Festival, and Haifa International Film Festival.

== Reception ==
Atsushi Ohara, writing for The Asahi Shimbun, compared the art style to Little Tadpoles Looking for Mama (1960) and The Cowboy's Flute (1963), but felt that A Story About Fire was underwhelming.

=== Accolades ===
Award	Date of ceremony	Category	Recipient(s)	Result	Ref.
38th Golden Rooster Awards	15 November 2025	Best Animation	A Story About Fire	Lost	
18th Asia Pacific Screen Awards	27 November 2025	Best Animated Film	A Story About Fire	Lost	
33rd Stuttgart International Festival of Animated Film	2026	AniMovie Award	A Story About Fire	Won	

== Works cited ==
=== News ===
- "《燃比娃》：首部宣纸水墨动画，重绘羌族古老传说". NetEase. 27 April 2026. Archived from the original on 1 June 2026.
- "A Story about Fire: film de Wenyu Li & Shanghai Animation Studio". Catsuka. 8 March 2026. Archived from the original on 1 June 2026.
- "Annecy Festival Unveils Work-in-Progress Selection for 2024". Animation Magazine. 23 May 2024. Archived from the original on 1 June 2026.
- "China estrena Ran Bi Wa, una animación hecha a mano en plena polémica por la IA". RTS Televisión Santafesina. 18 April 2026. Archived from the original on 1 June 2026.
- "China Film Pavilion Returns to Cannes as China Film Co-Production Corporation Presents Over 180 Domestic Films". Variety. 17 May 2026. Archived from the original on 1 June 2026.
- Keast, Jackie (16 October 2025). "'The Lost Tiger' nominated for Asia Pacific Screen Award". IF Magazine. Archived from the original on 1 June 2026.
- Mao, Lina (1 May 2026). "《燃比娃》的古朴和先锋，都"始于"四十年前". The Paper. Archived from the original on 1 June 2026.
- Milligan, Mercedes (10 May 2026). "'With Tapes and Toasts in the Car' Wins Oscar-Qualifying Prize at ITFS". Animation Magazine. Archived from the original on 1 June 2026.
- Ohara, Atsushi (24 February 2025). "ベルリン映画祭はテレパシー少女の夢を見ない 小原篤のアニマゲ丼". The Asahi Shimbun. Archived from the original on 1 June 2026.
- Scott, Matthew (14 May 2026). "From 'Ne Zha 2' to Hand-Painted Animation, Chinese Cinema Is Rewriting the Rules". The Hollywood Reporter. Archived from the original on 31 May 2026.
- Shi, Ge (15 November 2025). "第38届中国电影金鸡奖揭晓 《好东西》获得最佳故事片奖". Xinhua News Agency. Archived from the original on 1 June 2026.
- Sun, Jiayin (16 January 2025). "上美影出品《燃比娃》入围柏林国际电影节". Jiefang Daily. Archived from the original on 1 June 2026.
- Xue, Haowen (14 April 2026). "上美影新片《燃比娃》宣传曲MV曝光 DOUDOU唱响少年无畏热血冒险". Phoenix Television. Archived from the original on 1 June 2026.
- Yao, Xinyu (14 May 2026). "动画电影《燃比娃》阿坝州首映礼在汶川圆满举行". China News Service. Archived from the original on 1 June 2026.

=== Web ===
- "第38届中国电影金鸡奖提名名单". Golden Rooster Awards. Archived from the original on 1 June 2026.
- "祝贺我院设计与媒体艺术系李文瑜老师导演的动画电影《燃比娃》入围柏林国际电影节新生代Kplus竞赛单元". Sichuan University. 17 January 2025. Archived from the original on 1 June 2026.
- "A Story about Fire". Red Lotus Asian Film Festival. Archived from the original on 1 June 2026.
- "A Story About Fire (2025) Awards & Festivals". Mubi. Archived from the original on 1 June 2026.
- "Ran Bi Wa". Berlin International Film Festival. Archived from the original on 1 June 2026.
