= Beijing Pop Festival =

Music festival in Beijing, China

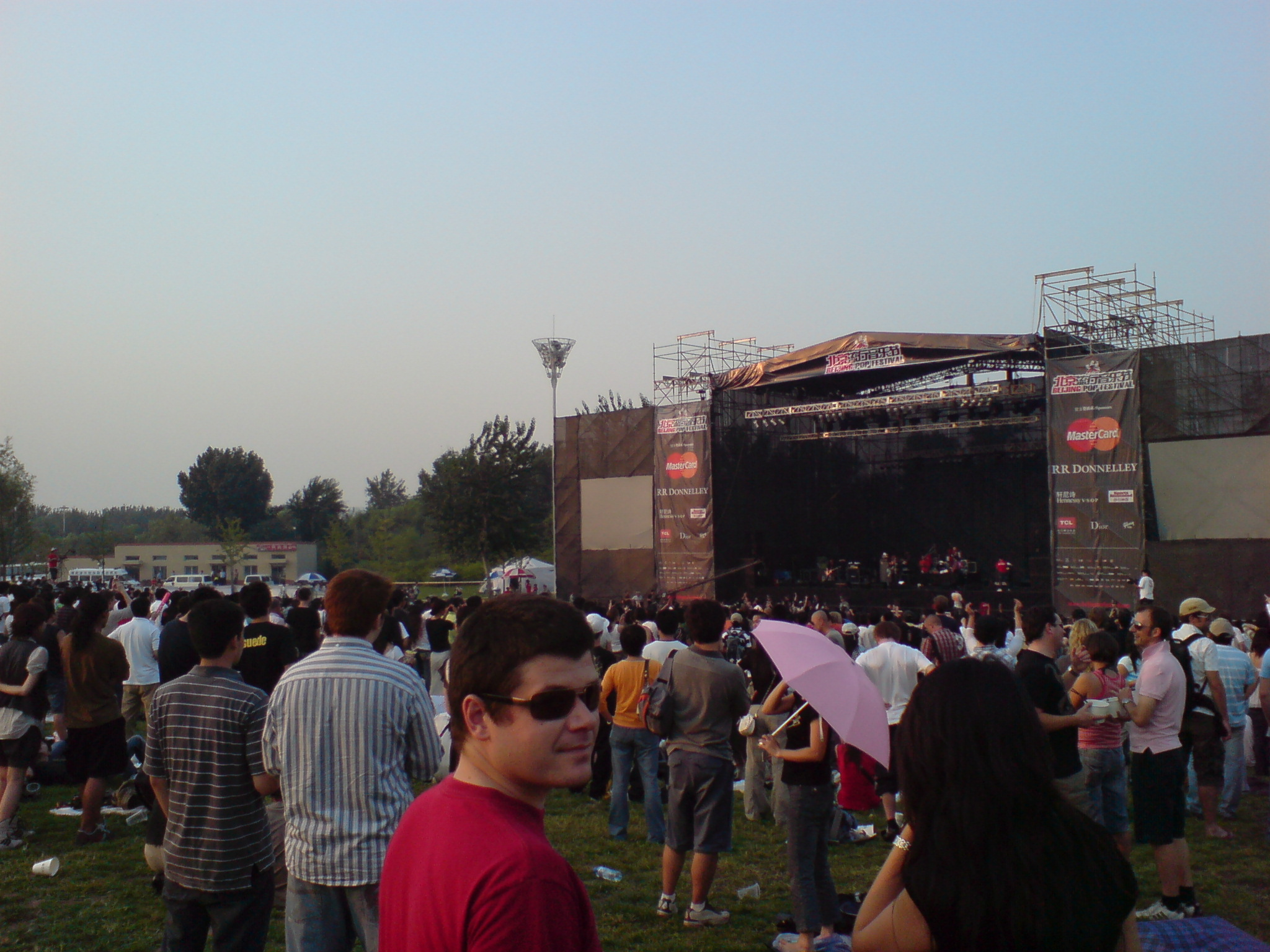
A performance at the 2007 Beijing Pop Festival at Chaoyang Park

The Beijing Pop Festival (Chinese: 北京流行音乐节; pinyin: Běijīng Liúxíng Yīnyuè Jié) was a rock music festival held in Beijing, China's Chaoyang Park each September since 2005. It featured rock bands from China as well as from overseas. It was a pioneer music event in China since it was the first international music festival with a permit from the Ministry of Culture of China.

It was founded by Jason Magnus, a Harvard graduate who is based in Hong Kong.

The 2005 festival featured Ian Brown, Common, Derrick May, Tang Dynasty and many others.

The 2006 festival featured Sebastian Bach, Placebo, Supergrass and the launch of a Burton snowboarding stage. There were 4 stages and over 80 acts played to 20,000 people.

Among the notable artists featured in the 2007 festival were Nine Inch Nails, Marky Ramone, New York Dolls, Public Enemy, Cui Jian, Brain Failure, Ra:IN and Wan Xiaoli. Cui Jian's performance made headlines because it was his first major outdoor concert in over a decade. 30,000 people attended.

== See also ==
- Beijing Jazz Festival
- Chinese rock
- Midi Modern Music Festival
- Modern Sky Festival
