= Happy Avenue =

Chinese band

- Genres: Chinese rock
- Years active: now
- Members: Wu Hongfei, Zhao Xinyu, Tian Kun, Geng Fang, Li Weiyan

Happy Avenue (sometimes translated as Lucky Road, Chinese: 幸福大街; pinyin: Xìngfú Dàjiē) is a Chinese rock band based in Beijing, China, founded in September 1999.

== Band members ==
Members include Wú Hóngfēi (吴虹飞, vocals), Gěng Fàng (耿放, electric guitar), Lǐ Wéiyán (李维岩, electric guitar), Zhào Xīnyǔ (赵新宇, electric bass), and Tián Kūn (田坤, drum set). Wu originally also played acoustic guitar in the group before deciding early on to focus strictly on vocals. The original bass player, Dí Shèng (翟胜), was replaced by Jiǎng Róng (蒋荣) in June 2000. Jiang was eventually replaced by Zhou, who was then replaced by Zhao in 2005.

Wu Hongfei (surname Wu, b. 1975), Happy Avenue's vocalist and leader, is a graduate of Beijing's prestigious Tsinghua University, with bachelor's degrees in environmental engineering and the editing of scientific books, and an M.A. degree in modern Chinese literature (although she primarily studied Western literature). Also the group's only female member, she has the distinction of being China's best known female rock singer. Originally from Sanjiang, in the southern Chinese province of Guangxi and a member of the Dong ethnic minority, Wu is also a magazine journalist and a published novelist. Her lyrics range from lighthearted, absurdist vignettes (like "The Orange Who Wished to Be an Apple") to darker and more melancholy meditations on subjects such as death, alienation, and longing. "Daughter" deals with the issues surrounding unwed motherhood. Some other songs feature literary subject matter; "The Fish Who Loved Xiaolong" tells the story of a mermaid, who gives up her tail in order that she might be able to leave the sea and marry a human.

The group's music is eclectic, and generally unclassifiable by genre, though occasionally somewhat reminiscent of such avant-garde groups as Talking Heads. Songs range from quirky, upbeat, and sardonic ("Daughter") to somber and brooding ("May"), the latter style leading some reviewers to describe the group's music as gothic. About the group, Wu says, "We never, ever let 'common taste' influence our music. We do what we like."

The group's melodies are catchy, with Wu's often pentatonic vocal melodies showing the influence of Chinese folk singing (leading the band to be described by some as a folk rock act). In some songs, Wu's expansive melodies extend to the highest register of her voice in a manner reminiscent of opera, while others are rather lullaby-like ("Knife"). The group's albums often utilize vocal overdubbing to create an angelic choral effect. In a few songs ("Daughter"), Wu sings in a more unorthodox manner, using abrupt sliding tones, whispering, and even screaming, displaying a wide range of emotions. Her often consciously edgy vocals, thus, contrast considerably with those of the sweeter and more formulaic styles of Mandopop and Cantopop singers such as Faye Wong or Teresa Teng.

While Wu's youthful-sounding vocals often show the influence of Chinese traditional music, the musical background provided by the band is more or less based in straight-ahead rock, ranging from simple flatpicked lines to all-out rocking grooves, giving each song a musical character different from the others. Lead guitarist Geng utilizes a wide range of guitar effects, lending a wide variety of timbres to the group's sound. The group's demo, "Grain," features Wu's voice with only a sensitive, classical-sounding acoustic guitar accompaniment.

Like most rock bands in China, Happy Avenue is essentially an underground or cult group, whose audience consists largely of students and those of college age. The group generally plays in bars such as Beijing's CD Cafe and Get Lucky Bar, and has also performed in several other Chinese cities. Its first performance took place on May 1, 2000, at the Midi Modern Music Festival, sponsored by the Beijing Midi School of Music. Despite their consistent efforts, Happy Avenue's members have as yet found it impossible to reap financial rewards from their work, due in part to poor promotion of their music by their record labels, as well as due to current Chinese musical tastes.

Happy Avenue released its first CD, A Fish in Xiao Long's Room, in 2004. During the recording of this album, Wu was writing her master's thesis, and, in order to complete the recording, postponed her graduation for a year. Their subsequent disc was released in 2005. Their track "Daughter" was included on the Beijing Band 2001: New Rock Bands from the People's Republic of China compilation CD, produced by American producer Matthew Corbin Clark. Due to Clark's efforts, Happy Avenue's music achieved recognition in the United States with the inclusion of their song "Daughter" in China in the Red (2003), a PBS Frontline television documentary about contemporary China.

Wu has written candidly about her experiences with Happy Avenue in her semi-autobiographical novel The Double Life of Afei. She released a four-song solo EP in 2007.

== Discography ==
=== Compilations ===
- 2003 - Beijing Band 2001: New Rock Bands from the People's Republic of China. Kemaxiu Music.
- 2004 - First Chinese release.
- 2005 - Second Chinese release.
- 2008 - Released new album 胭脂 (yān zhī, "perfume")
- 2010 - Released new album 再不相爱就老了 (zài bù xiāng ài jiù lǎo le, "time and tide, wait no man"), along with a book of the same name.
- 2011 - Published book 活得像个笑话——黄缎子 (huó dé xiàng gè xiào huà —— huáng duàn zi, "live like a joke").
- 2012 - Published book 讲黄笑话的中国女孩 (jiǎng huáng xiào huà de zhōng guó nǚ hái, "the Chinese girl that tells inappropriate jokes") in Hong Kong.
- Also 2012 - Published book 嫁衣 (jià yī, "bridal gown") adapted from a song with the same name.

== See also ==
- Chinese rock
