= Gao Qi (musician) =

Chinese musician

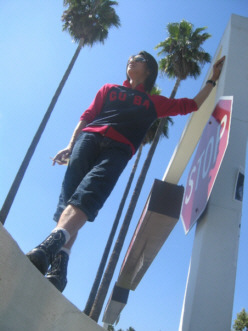
Gao Qi in Los Angeles, 2003

Gao Qi (高旗), the lead vocalist and songwriter of the Chinese rock band Overload, was born in a family with generations' classical music background in Beijing on February 26, 1968. His father is a tenor, and his mother is a pianist.

After withdrawing from the university, Gao, as guitarist and songwriter, joined the Chinese rock band Breath, and performed on the first-ever rock festival in China, the Beijing Modern Music Concert, in February 1990. The band released their first album, Breath, in Asia in 1991.

Fascinated by heavy metal, Gao then quit Breath and set up his own band, Overload, with guitarist Han Hongbin, Li Yanliang, bassist Wang Xueke and drummer Zhao Muyang, who were said to be the finest rock musicians in China at that time.

The songs Gao wrote combine western rock and Chinese literature and his performance burst the enthusiasm of both audience and musicians. The band built up a thrash metal style which began to attract a large number of fans in a short time.

The first single released by Overload, "The Shadow of Ancestor," was recorded on the album Rock Beijing, which was the label record of Chinese Rock in 1993. Meanwhile, Gao Qi's knowledge in Chinese rock and modern Western music give him chance to be engaged as music producer and songwriter in China's first rock movie Long Hair in the Wind, and as special freelancer for foreign music of Beijing Music Broadcasting. In 1995, the British music magazine the WIRE interviewed him.

The band released their first album, OVERLOAD, in 1996. Their CD, Magic Blue Sky, was released in 1999, and their latest one, Life is an adventure, came out in 2002.

== See also ==
- C-Rock/Sino-Rock
- Cui Jian
- Breath (Chinese rock band)
- Overload (Chinese rock band)
- Tang Dynasty (band)
