= Cobra (Chinese band) =

Chinese rock band

The Chinese release of the first self-named album Yanjingshe

Cobra (traditional Chinese: 眼鏡蛇樂隊; simplified Chinese: 眼镜蛇乐队; pinyin: Yǎnjìngshé yuèduì) was an all-female rock band from Beijing, China. The band formed in 1989, becoming the first all-female rock band in mainland China. With only one album out, they disbanded in the late 1990s. Their style was a gloomy, bluesy type of hard rock with slight touches of new wave and alternative metal. Cobra was very popular in the beginning of their career.

Group members included Yang Ying, Yu Jin, Wang Xiaofang, and Xiao Nan. Additional members that were in the band included Lin Xue and Suo Yi.

== Career ==
Cobra was founded in the spring of 1989 by four female musicians in Beijing. It was initially a cover band that played popular Chinese folk songs and English-language pop rock songs. Cobra saw the start of their popularity when they appeared at the "Concert of Modern Music" event in 1990. They soon released a single, "My own Paradise" in 1992 which appeared in a compilation album called Rocking Beijing.

In 1992, one of the early members, Yang Ying, left Cobra. That same year, the band recruited Suo Yi and Lin Xue (Lin Xue would later leave Cobra in 1999).

In 1994, Cobra released their first album titled Hypocrisy and released their second album, Cobra II, in 2000. The band soon after disbanded in late 2000, citing the nascent nature of the Chinese rock scene, where chances for better financial rewards and artistic acclaim were few.

== Reception ==
Due to the uniqueness of Cobra being an all-female Chinese rock band, they received significant attention not only from Chinese media but also in Western circles. Some western commentators viewed the band as a progressive force for Chinese feminism.

== Discography ==
- 1994 - First released as Hypocrisy (Germany 1994, USA 1996) republished as Yanjingshe (China 1996)
- 2000 - Cobra - Yangjingshe II (China)

== See also ==
- Chinese rock
- Hang on the Box

== Sources ==
- Wong, Cynthia P. (2005). "Lost Lambs": Rock, Gender, Authenticity, and A Generational Response to Modernity in the People's Republic of China." Ph.D. dissertation. New York, New York: Columbia University, 2005.
