= Modern Sky Festival =

Music festival in Beijing, China

The Modern Sky Festival (Chinese: 摩登天空音乐节; pinyin: Módēng Tiānkōng Yīnyuè Jié) is an outdoor rock music festival in Beijing, China, organized by the Modern Sky record label.

The first festival was held October 2–4, 2007 at Haidian Park. It featured four stages of music and over 120 bands, including the headliners, the American band Yeah Yeah Yeahs. Chinese bands included New Pants, Rebuilding The Rights Of Statues, P.K. 14, Queen Sea Big Shark, Joyside, Carsick Cars, and Snapline.

In the 2009 festival, all foreign bands were dropped from performing due to "unforeseen circumstances". Only local Chinese bands performed.

As of 2014, the parent company Modern Sky Entertainment put on more than 20 festivals a year throughout China. In August 2014, Modern Sky announced its first festival in the United States, to be held in Central Park's Rumsey Playfield October 4–5.

== See also ==
- Beijing Jazz Festival
- Beijing Pop Festival
- Chinese rock
- Midi Music Festival
- Plexifilm
