= Overload (Chinese band) =

Chinese speed and thrash metal band

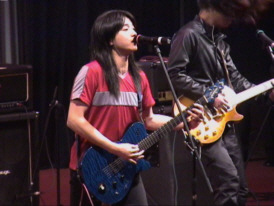
Gao Qi (left) and Li Yanliang of Overload seen here in this picture taken during a concert in Beijing

Overload (超载乐队 chaozai) is a Chinese rock band, and considered the first speed and thrash metal band on the Chinese heavy metal scene.

Gao Qi (高旗), the former guitarist and songwriter of the band The Breathing (呼吸乐队), set up his own band Overload with guitarist Han Hongbin (韩鸿宾), Li Yanliang (李延亮), bassist Wang Xueke (王学科) and drummer Zhao Muyang (赵牧阳), all well accomplished and well-known heavy rock musicians in China at that time. The band made their band debut on Halloween 1991.

The songs Gao Qi wrote combine western rock and Chinese literature and his performance burst the enthusiasm of both audience and players. The band built up a thrash metal style which had attracted a large number of fans in a short time.

The first single "The shadow of ancestor," was recorded on the album Rock Beijing a compilation album of Chinese rock in 1993. Meanwhile, Gao Qi's knowledge in Chinese rock and modern Western music give him chance to be engaged as a music producer and songwriter in the film Long hair in the wind and as a freelancer for foreign music at Beijing Music Broadcasting.

== Albums ==
- Overload 1996
- Magic Blue Sky 1998
- Life Is An Adventure 2002

== See also ==
- Chinese rock
- Cui Jian
- Dou Wei
- Tang Dynasty
- Zhang Chu
