= Peking All-Stars =

- Origin: Peking, China
- Genre: Rock
- Years active: 1979–1984
- Label: none

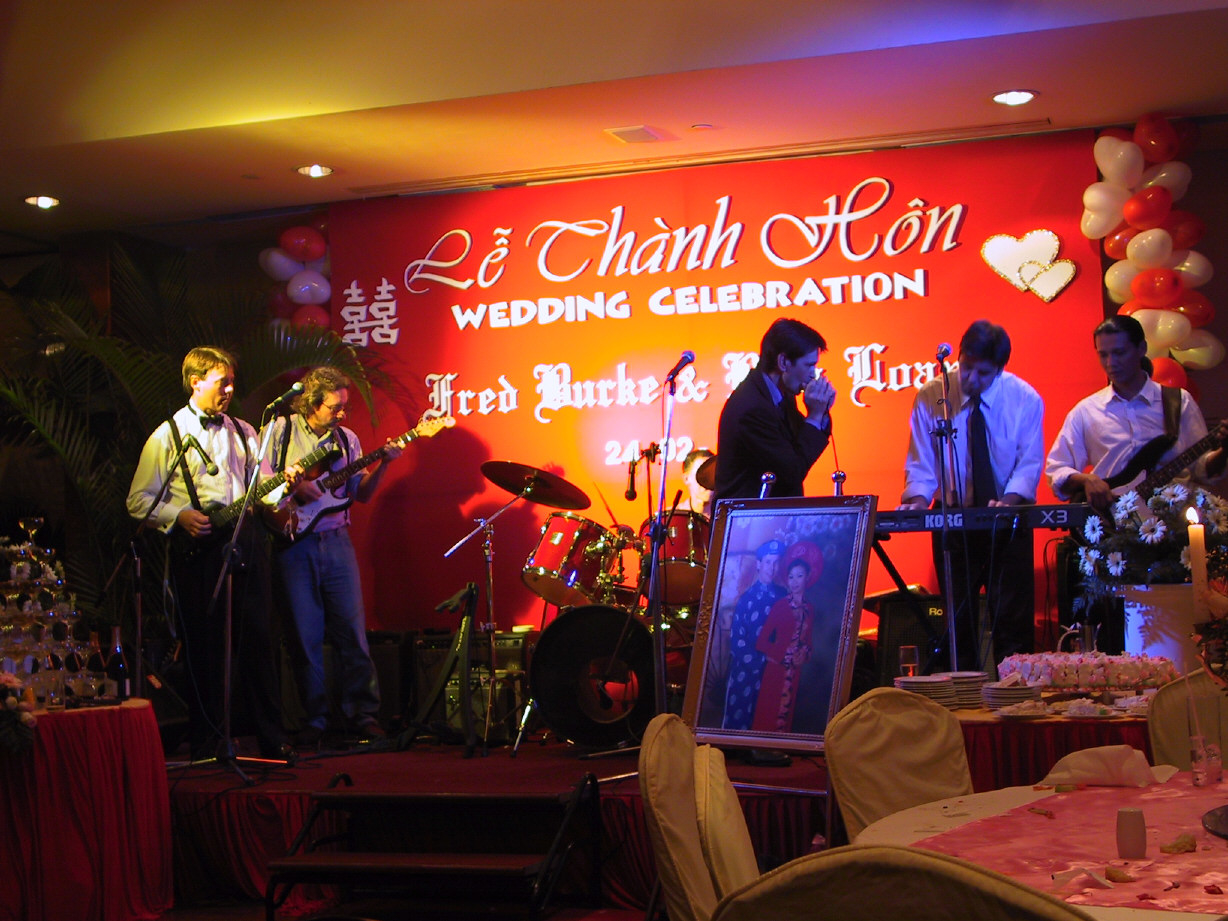
Peking All-Stars circa 1985

The Peking All-Stars were a rock band formed in Beijing in 1979 by a number of foreigners then resident in the Chinese capital, the same year as the first Chinese rock band, Wan Li Ma Wang (万里马王) was formed. The band was formed by Graham Earnshaw, on guitar and vocals, Chris, a Brazilian drummer, and Richard Thwaites, an Australian bass player who doubled as the China correspondent of the Australian Broadcasting Commission. It played one of the first rock concerts in China at a university campus hall in Beijing in late summer of 1979. Their performance at Beijing's Teacher's College in 1981 was commemorated by a photograph in the book China After Mao by Liu Heung Shing.

== Members ==
The lineup changed regularly over the years, but members included:

- Guitarist and singer Graham Earnshaw, the band's founder, who went on to claim to be the first person to play the kazoo on the Great Wall of China.
- Guitarist Michael Schoenhals, later to leverage his collection of Chairman Mao buttons into a position as Scandinavian expert on China's Cultural Revolution.
- Palestinian lead guitarist Nassir, who took a sabbatical from the band in mid-1983 to drive tanks against Israel in southern Lebanon, and committed suicide in around 1991.
- American guitarist Tad Stoner, who later became a journalist and bar owner in Hong Kong and is now a journalist in the Cayman Islands.
- American bass player Fred Burke, who went on to become a prominent corporate lawyer in Vietnam.
- American guitarist Larry Vest.
- Swedish sax player Frédéric Cho, who went on to become one of Scandinavia's top China financial experts and Asian Manager at HQ Bank.
- Madagascan drummer Robinson, who went on to found his own band named Nogabe that is currently based in London.

== Dissolution ==
The band played a number of performances at the Friendship Hotel, the Jianguo Hotel, the Beijing Foreign Languages Institute and at embassies, but restrictions on cultural activities resulting from the so-called Anti-Spiritual Pollution Campaign in 1983-1984 made it difficult for the band to find opportunities to gig.

Earnshaw, who owned the bands gear, eventually passed on the drums and amplifiers to a Madagascan band that was starting up in 1984, while his Fender Telecaster went on long-term loan to the Madagascan guitarist Eddie Randriamampionona, who later became the lead guitarist with the so-called godfather of Chinese rock, Cui Jian.
