= Re-Tros =

Chinese post-punk/experimental rock band

Re-Tros 重塑雕像的权利
- Origin: Beijing, China
- Genres: Post-punk, experimental rock, indie rock
- Years active: 2003–present
- Label: Modern Sky (摩登天空)
- Members: Hua Dong (华东) – vocals, guitar, keyboards; Liu Min (刘敏) – bass, vocals, keyboards; Huang Jin (黄锦) – drums, percussion

Re-Tros, stylized as Re-TROS (an abbreviation of Rebuilding the Rights of Statues, Chinese: 重塑雕像的权利) is a Chinese rock band formed in Beijing in 2003. The group is noted for blending post-punk and experimental rock elements, with intricate arrangements, electronics and an energetic live presence that has drawn international attention.

== History ==
=== Formation and early years (2003–2009) ===
Re-Tros formed in 2003 in Beijing. The current core line-up comprises Hua Dong (vocals, guitar, keyboards), Liu Min (bass, vocals, keyboards) and Huang Jin (drums, percussion). The band signed to the Chinese label Modern Sky and released the EP Cut Off! in 2005; during the recording, Brian Eno contributed improvised parts using synthesizers and electronic treatments, which drew attention within China's indie scene.

The band's early activity included Beijing livehouse performances and a national tour following the EP release. In 2009, Re-TROS issued their first full-length album, Watch Out! Climate Has Changed, Fat Mum Rises..., expanding their palette with more electronic and experimental elements.

=== International activity and Before the Applause (2010–2017) ===
In 2011, Re-Tros toured Australia with Gang of Four and appeared at Japan's Summer Sonic festival. In 2013, they supported Public Image Ltd on the group's first shows in China.

Re-TROS released their second studio album, Before the Applause (2017), produced by Hector Castillo (known for work with David Bowie, Lou Reed and Björk). The record received positive critical notices in English-language media: The Quietus praised its boundary-blurring approach between post-punk and electronica, while Loud and Quiet awarded it four stars.

Later in 2017, the band opened European arena dates for Depeche Mode on their Global Spirit Tour, and appeared as the opening act for The xx in Beijing during the band's Asia tour. They also toured North America that year, including as co-headliners or tour partners with Xiu Xiu.

=== Domestic profile and large-scale shows (2018–2021) ===
In 2018, Re-Tros received recognition at domestic music awards for Before the Applause, including honours at the CMA Music Awards such as Band of the Year and Best Rock Album.

The group participated in the 2020 reality music programme The Big Band (Season 2) on iQIYI, which broadened their mainstream visibility.

In May 2021, Re-Tros launched the arena-scale concert series, After the Applause, with a headline show at the Mercedes-Benz Arena in Shanghai reported at around 10,000 attendees—unusual for a Chinese indie rock act.

=== Recent years (2022–present) ===
Between 2022 and 2023, Re-Tros undertook their InBetween China tour. In 2024, the band mounted the RE+ North American tour with Liars and Battles, covering eight cities including New York, Toronto, San Francisco, Los Angeles, Seattle, Vancouver, Boston and Chicago. In April 2024, Re-TROS recorded a live session at KEXP in Seattle; the performance video was published in May 2024.

During the 40th anniversary of China–France diplomatic relations, the band performed at the China–France Next Beats Beyond Borders Youth Music Festival alongside Jean-Benoît Dunckel and others. Later in 2024, Re-Tros toured the UK (London and Manchester) and appeared in China and Japan on co-bills with Zazen Boys.

== Musical style ==
Critics have described Re-Tros' sound as a tense and minimalist hybrid of post-punk, electronics and experimental rock, balancing a cold, mechanical edge with bursts of live intensity.

== Critical reception ==
The Quietus lauded Before the Applause as "a bold, unpredictable record that blurs boundaries between post-punk and electronica." Billboard highlighted the dark, visually striking video for "Sounds for Celebration." Loud and Quiet praised the album's internationalist sensibility.

== Discography ==
=== Studio albums ===
- Cut Off! (EP, 2005)
- Watch Out! Climate Has Changed, Fat Mum Rises... (2009)
- Before the Applause (2017)

=== Selected singles ===
- "Viva Murder" (demo, 2012)
- "Pigs in the River" (2017)
- "8+2+8 II" (2017)
- "8+2+8 I" (Paul Frick Remix) (2017)
- "Three-Body" (2023)

== Tours ==
=== Selected international tours ===
- Support for Depeche Mode on their Global Spirit Tour (Europe, 2017).
- North America (2017, incl. dates with Xiu Xiu).
- RE+ North America (2024).
- UK (2024).
- China/Japan special set with Zazen Boys (2024).

=== Major domestic concerts ===
- After the Applause arena series (2021–2024), incl. Mercedes-Benz Arena (Shanghai, 22 May 2021).
