= The Samans =

Chinese metal band

- Origin: Changchun, Jilin, China
- Genres: Folk metal, Melodic death metal, Power metal, Industrial metal (early)
- Years active: 2007–present
- Members: Lifu Wang; Yaxin Gao; Zhichao Ren; Xiaoyu Zhai; Chenglin Ji; Ji Qi
- Past members: Nuo Xu; Ming Qu

The Samans (Chinese: 萨满; pinyin: Sàmǎn) is a Chinese metal band formed in 2007 in Changchun, Jilin. It has six members: Lifu Wang (lead vocals), Yaxin Gao (programming and samples), Zhichao Ren (guitar), Xiaoyu Zhai (guitar), Chenglin Ji (drums), and Ji Qi (bass). Their sound has evolved from electronic and industrial metal towards folk and melodic death metal. The band's name comes from the shamanist religion of its members from Northeast China and Inner Mongolia. They adopted the spelling "The Samans" rather than "Shaman" because they hold that the word is not pronounced that way in their own language. Most of their songs are in English.

== Career ==
On August 4, 2011, The Samans performed at the Ocean Midi Festival in Rizhao, Shandong. On April 29, 2012, they performed at the Beijing Midi Festival. In 2023, the band was among the heavy-music acts billed for the Yantai Huang–Bohai Sea Midi Festival.

== Musical style and influences ==
The band started as a two-piece electronic act in the nu-breakbeat style. After first appearing on stage in 2007, their sound shifted from nu-breakbeat and EBM with metal elements towards industrial metal and alternative metal. They later incorporated melodic death metal and folk metal elements, including the use of flutes and whistles.

They cite industrial metal bands such as Rammstein, KMFDM, Deathstars and Neue Deutsche Haerte as influences.

== Lyrics ==
Most of the band's lyrics are written by lead vocalist Lifu Wang.

== Discography ==
=== Albums and EPs ===
- Weltreich (EP) (2009)
- Khan (EP) (2011)
- Whalesong (EP) (2012)
- Lionheart (EP) (2013)
- Saga×Monologue (double album) (2021)

=== Singles ===
- Silent Planet (2008)
- Death March (2008)
- Moths to the Flame We Are (2009)
- Attila (2009)
- The Marines (2009)
- Snowblind (2009)

== See also ==
- Chinese rock
