= Northwest Wind =

Chinese music style

Northwest Wind (Chinese: 西北风; pinyin: xīběi fēng) is a style of music which emerged on the popular music scene in mainland China from the northwestern or xibei portion of China specifically from the Shanxi, Shaanxi and Gansu provinces. The style is a western-style fast tempo, strong beat and extremely aggressive bass lines that is distinctly different from cantopop or mandopop from Hong Kong and Taiwan respectively. It later evolved into Chinese Rock in the late 1980s.

== See also ==
- Shidaiqu
- Prison Song
- Chinese rock
