= Reflector (band) =

Chinese rock band

Reflector (反光鏡楽隊) is a rock band that formed in Beijing in 1997. According to the band's official English language website, Reflector has been featured on CNN and in Newsweek magazine. Reflector lists among its English language musical influences the bands Green Day, NOFX and Lagwagon. In 2000 their song "Scream Club" was featured in the movie Warm Summer Day.

In 2001 Reflector became one of the first bands (which many in China consider to be "punk") from China to tour the United States; the band performed in seven West Coast cities, including a gig in Sacramento opening for punk band Anti-Flag.

The band performed at Cui Jian's 2003 Live Vocals festival, and in the 2003 Midi Music Festival.

== Personnel ==
- Tian Jianhua a.k.a. "Tj" - bass/vocals
- Li Peng - guitar/vocals
- Ye Jingying - drums/background vocals

== Discography ==
- 1999 - Wuliao Contingent compilation, 8 songs
- 2002 - Reflector EP on People's Records
