= Beijing Jazz Festival =

Jazz Festival

Coordinates: 39°55′N 116°23′E

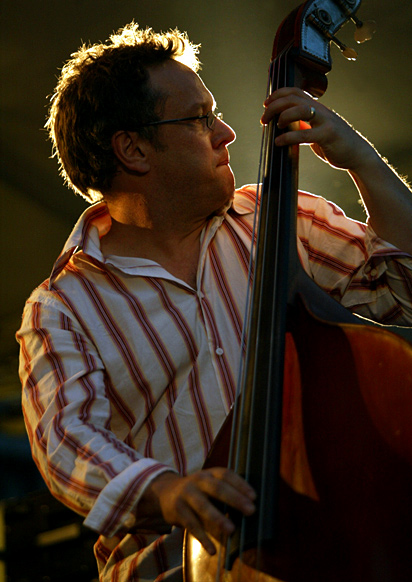
Nick Haywood at the Beijing Jazz Festival

The Beijing Jazz Festival (Chinese: 北京爵士音乐节; pinyin: Běijīng Juéshì Yīnyuè Jié) is China's first and largest jazz festival. It was founded in 1993 by Udo Hoffmann, a German national living in China. The festival is hosted by the Beijing Midi School of Music and Beijing Midi Productions.

The festival was held in Beijing from 1993 to 1999, with a seven-year hiatus. The festival returned to Beijing from September 21 to 23, 2007, and has taken place outdoors in Haidian Park, in Beijing's northwestern Haidian District.

The festival features jazz musicians from China and all around the world. Performers have included the U.S. jazz musicians as Wynton Marsalis and Jon Jang, as well as many artists and groups from Scandinavia.

List of bands and musicians 1994 to 1999 (source: Wolfgang in der Wiesche, leading sound engineer and production manager of the festival 1994-99)

Beijing International Jazz Festival 1994

Wide Angle (China)

Scandinavian Jazz Quartett (Denmark, Finland)

E.M.T. (Lithuania, Germany)

Lluis-Vidal-Trio (Spain)

Pascal v. Wroblewsky Trio (Germany)

Jon Rose - Otomo Yosihide (Australia + Japan)

Stephane Kochoyan Trio (France)

Neighbours (Austria)

Gaoshan Liushui (China + Germany)

Liu Yuan + Kong Hongwei (China)

Willem Breuker Kollektief (Netherlands)

Beijing International Jazz Festival 1995

Stéphane Planchon's "Rendez-vous" (France)

NDR Bigband, feat. Palle Mikkelborg: "The History of Jazz" (Germany)

Liu Yuan Band (China)

Martin Speake Group (UK)

Ding Wei and Wide Angle (China)

The Palle Mikkelborg Duo (Denmark)

Clusone Trio (The Netherlands)

Illouz (France)

Paolo Frescu Quartet (Italy)

Howard "Hojo" Johnson (USA) and the NDR Bigband

Beijing Jazz Unit (China)

Chano Dominguez Group (Spain)

Eugene Pao Group (HongKong)

Beijing International Jazz Festival 1996

Beijing Jazz Unit (China)

Sixun (France)

Liu Yuan Group (China)

Steffen Schorn/ Claudio Puntin Duo (Germany)

Land (USA)

Misha Mengelberg Solo Piano (Netherlands)

Tien Square (China)

Karin Krog Group (Norway)

Steve Bailock's Swingthing (USA)

Misha Mengelberg/ Han Bennink/ George Lewis Trio (Netherlands, USA)

Cercle Trio (Austria, UK)

Rios (USA)

Christof Lauer Trio (Germany)

Django Bates' Human Chain (UK)

Guys (China)

Enrico Rava's Carmen Project (Italy, China)

Pierre Doerge's New Jungle Orchestra (Denmark)

Shanghai International Jazz Concert Series 1996 (organized by Beijing International Jazz Festival)

Steve Bailock's Swingthing (USA)

Django Bates' Human Chain (UK)

Sixun (France)

Enrico Rava Trio (Italy)

Pierre Doerge's New Jungle Orchestra (Denmark)

Liu Yuan Group (China)

Beijing International Jazz Festival 1997

P.L.A. Orchestra- Golden Angle Jazz Band (China)

Nils Landgren Funk Unit (Sweden)

Antonio Martinez "Candela" (Spain)

Jon Jang Sextett (USA/ China)

Uli Lenz/ Johannes Barthelmes Duo (Germany)

Willem Breuker Kollektief (The Netherlands) + Chinese Strings

Keiko Lee (Japan)

The Far East Side Band (USA/ China/ Japan/ Korea)

Rhythm Dogs Big Band(China)

Ensemble for New Improvised Music (Germany/ USA/ Russia/ New Zealand)

John Taylor/ John Surman (UK)

Gianluigi Trovesi Octet (Italy)

Liu Yuan Group (China)

Doky Brothers (Denmark)

Richard Galliano Trio (France)

Betty Carter (USA)

Beijing International Jazz Festival 1998

Ugetsu (Germany)

Jazz Crusaders (USA)

Liu Yuan Group (China)

Banda Sonora & PLA Orchestra (Italy, China)

Guus Janssen Quintet (The Netherlands)

Danish Radio Jazz Orchestra (Denmark)

Hiroshi Minami Quartet (Japan)

Lost Chart Ensemble (Canada)

Fred van Hove (Belgium)

Irene Schweizer/ Pierre Favre (Switzerland)

Ten Part Invention (Australia)

Paul Motian's Electric Bebop Band (USA)

Jon Rose (Australia)

Dieter Glawischnig/ Andreas Schreiber Duo (Austria)

Mynta (Sweden, India)

Dave Holland Group (USA)

Beijing International Jazz Festival 1999

Doctor 3 (Italy)

Vienna Art Orchestra (Austria)

Lenni-Kalle Taipale (Finland)

Wanderlust (Australia)

In-Sound-Out (China)

Nordic Sounds (Denmark, Finland, Norway, Sweden)

Dainius Pulauskas Sextet (Lithuania)

Liu Sola and Friends (USA)

Papadimitriou-Sylleou Duo (Greece)

Kiichiro Hayashi (Japan)

B.J. Funk (China)

Trevor Watts Moire Music Drum Orchestra (UK)

Chen Dili (China)

Denis Colin Trio (France)

Michiel Borstlap Sextet (Netherlands)

David Sanchez (USA)

== See also ==
- Beijing Pop Festival
- Midi Music Festival
