= Beijing Midi School of Music =

Music school in Beijing, China

The Beijing Midi School of Music (Chinese: 北京迷笛音乐学校; pinyin: Běijīng Mídí Yīnyuè Xuéxiào) is a music school in Beijing, China, established in 1993.

The school sponsors the annual Midi Music Festival, which was first held in May 2000 in Beijing, Midi Music Awards and the Beijing Jazz Festival.

The School's Dean is Zhang Fan.

== See also ==
- Chinese rock
