= Gemini (Chinese band) =

Chinese rock band

- Origin: Beijing, China
- Genres: Pop; Alternative rock Electronic
- Years active: 2006-Present
- Labels: Zhushu
- Members: Gabryl (小文); Suna (苏娜)

Gemini (Chinese: 简迷离; pinyin: Jiànmílí) is a Chinese rock band that consists of French composer, guitarist, and vocalist Gabryl (小文) and Chinese singer-songwriter, pianist, and lead vocalist Suna (苏娜). They are also the first French-Chinese rock band in China.

== History ==
While Suna was in France, Gabryl and Suna met on the online dating website Meetic in 2004. From there they decided to make music together and are now currently residing in Beijing, China. Their debut album Personal Life came out in 2006 and was well received. They are signed under the record label Zhu Shu Entertainment in China.

== Style ==
Gemini's style is mainly that of the rock music genre, however it has other aspects that distinguishes itself from that of other artists such as the use of electronic music and a dual vocalist set-up. Their songs have exhibited Mandarin Chinese, English and French. They also have some pop and hip-hop influences in their music as well.

== Discography ==
- Personal Life (私人生活) (2006)
- The Last Night of Monsters (落幕之舞) (2010)
- Until The End (末日恋曲) (2011)
- Me Too (迷图) (2015)
- Gemini (简迷离) (2016)
- 2020+ (2020)
