= Yaksa (band) =

Chinese metal band

- Origin: Beijing, China
- Genres: Nu metal, metalcore, death metal
- Years active: 1997–present
- Label: Freedomroad
- Members: Hu Song; Huang Tao; Wang Youjin; Gao Yufeng; Ma Lin; Wang Le

Yaksa (Yecha) (Chinese: 夜 叉; pinyin: Yecha) is a Chinese metalcore band that became active in the Beijing rock scene in 1997.

Yaksa was among the first of the wave of metal bands that appeared on the largely underground rock scene in Beijing in the late 1990s. Its original members all came from the interior province of Sichuan. With its thick, powerful sound and ultra-aggressive growling vocals, the band's style was a departure from that of the punk rock bands that were the fad of the moment.

Yaksa recorded what is widely regarded as the first Chinese nu metal album, Freedom (自由), released by Scream Records (嚎叫唱片) in 1999. The band followed up their debut three years later with Fa Fa Fa' (发发发), adding more vocal melody as well as disc scratching and sampling to their sound. In 2006, with Scream Records in shambles, the band independently issued an EP entitled Keep on Fighting, returning to their heavier roots.

== Members ==
- Hu Song - vocals
- Ma Kai - guitar
- Ershat Alim - guitar
- Zhang Xiaota - bass
- Wang Shizhan - drums
- Yue Wang - turntablist

== Discography ==
=== Studio albums ===
- Freedom (自由) — 1999, Scream Records
- Fa Fa Fa (发发发) — 2002, Scream Records
- Keep on Fighting — 2006, Independent/Freedom Road Records
- You Aren't the Loser — 2010, Independent Label
- Undercurrent (暗流) — 2016, Independent Label
- I Am (我即是) — 2019, Independent Label

== See also ==
- Chinese rock
