= Qiang folk religion =

Indigenous religion of the Qiang people

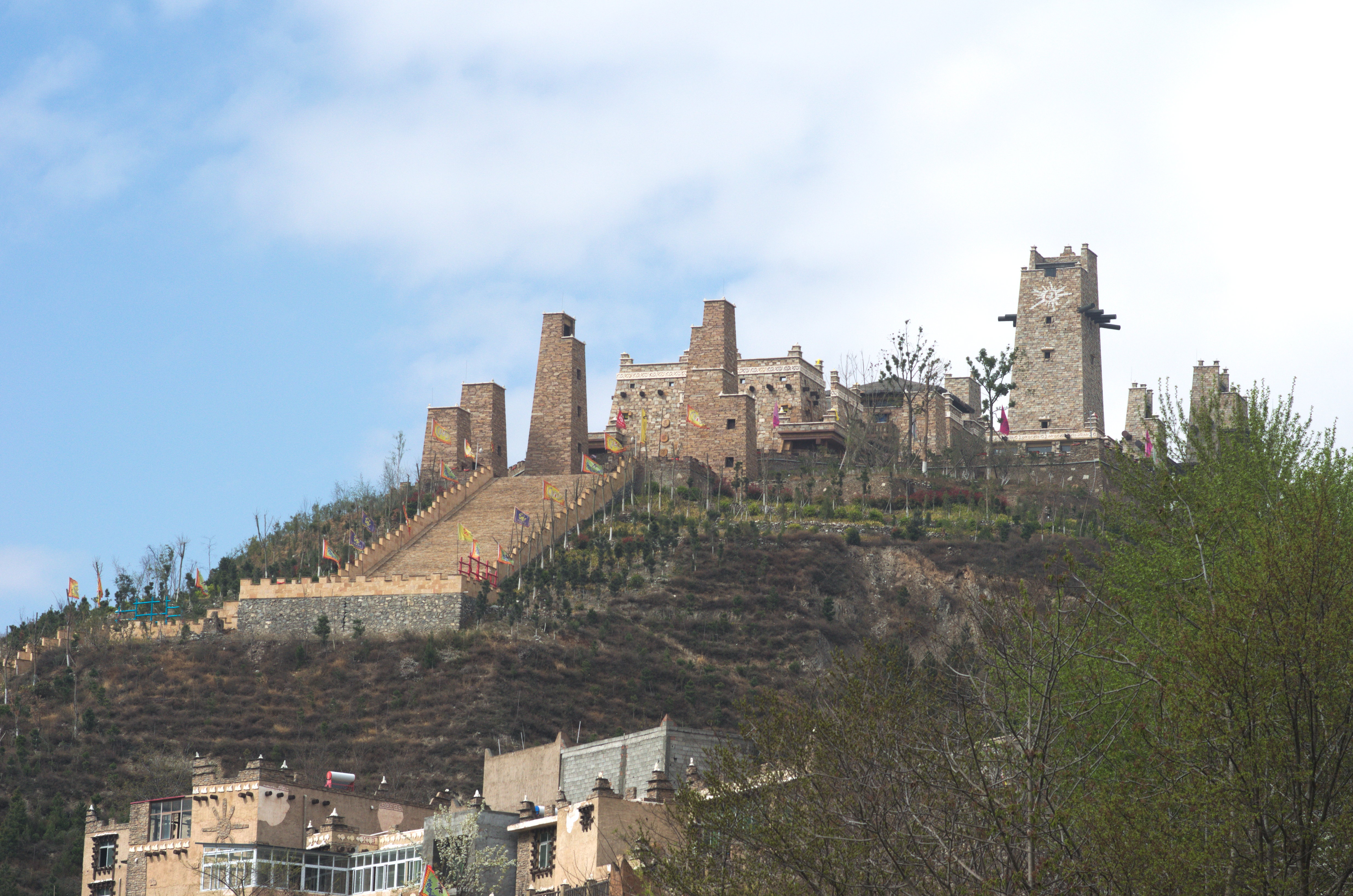
Silver Turtle Temple (銀龜神廟; Yínguīshénmiào) is a major centre of Qiang folk religion consecrated in 2013–2014, a complex of temples dedicated to various gods. (Note: Among the chapels of the Silver Turtle Temple (銀龜神廟; Yínguīshénmiào) there are a Great Temple of Yandi (炎帝大殿; Yándì dàdiǎn), a Great Temple of Dayu (大禹大殿; Dàyǔ dàdiàn) and a Great Temple of Li Yuanhao (李元昊大殿; Lǐyuánhào dàdiàn), considered the most important deities of the Qiang people.) It is located on Qiangshan, in Mao, Ngawa, Sichuan.

Qiang folk religion is the indigenous religion of the majority of the Qiang people, an ethnic group of Sichuan (China) tightly related to the Han Chinese and the Tibetans. It is pantheistic, involving the worship of a variety of gods of nature and of human affairs, including Qiang progenitors. White stones are worshipped as it is believed they can be invested with the power of some gods through rituals. The supreme god is Mubyasei ("god of Heaven"), which is connected to the Chinese concept of Tian and identified by the Qiang with the Taoist-originated Jade Emperor.

Religious ceremonies and rituals are directed by priests called duāngōng in Chinese. They are shamans who acquire their position through years of training with a teacher. Duāngōng are the custodians of Qiang theology, history and mythology. They also administer the coming of age ceremony for 18-year-old boys, called the "sitting on top of the mountain", which involves the boy's entire family going to mountain tops to sacrifice a sheep or cow, and to plant three cypress trees.

Two of the most important religious holidays are the Qiang New Year, falling on the 24th day of the sixth month of the lunar calendar (though now it is fixed on October 1), and the Mountain Sacrifice Festival, held between the second and the sixth month of the lunar calendar. The former festival is to give sacrifice to the god of Heaven, while the latter is dedicated to the god of mountains.

== See also ==
- Chinese folk religion
- Chinese shamanism
- Dongbaism
- Mongolian shamanism
- Tibetan folk religion ("Bon")
