= Haidian Park =

City park in Beijing, China

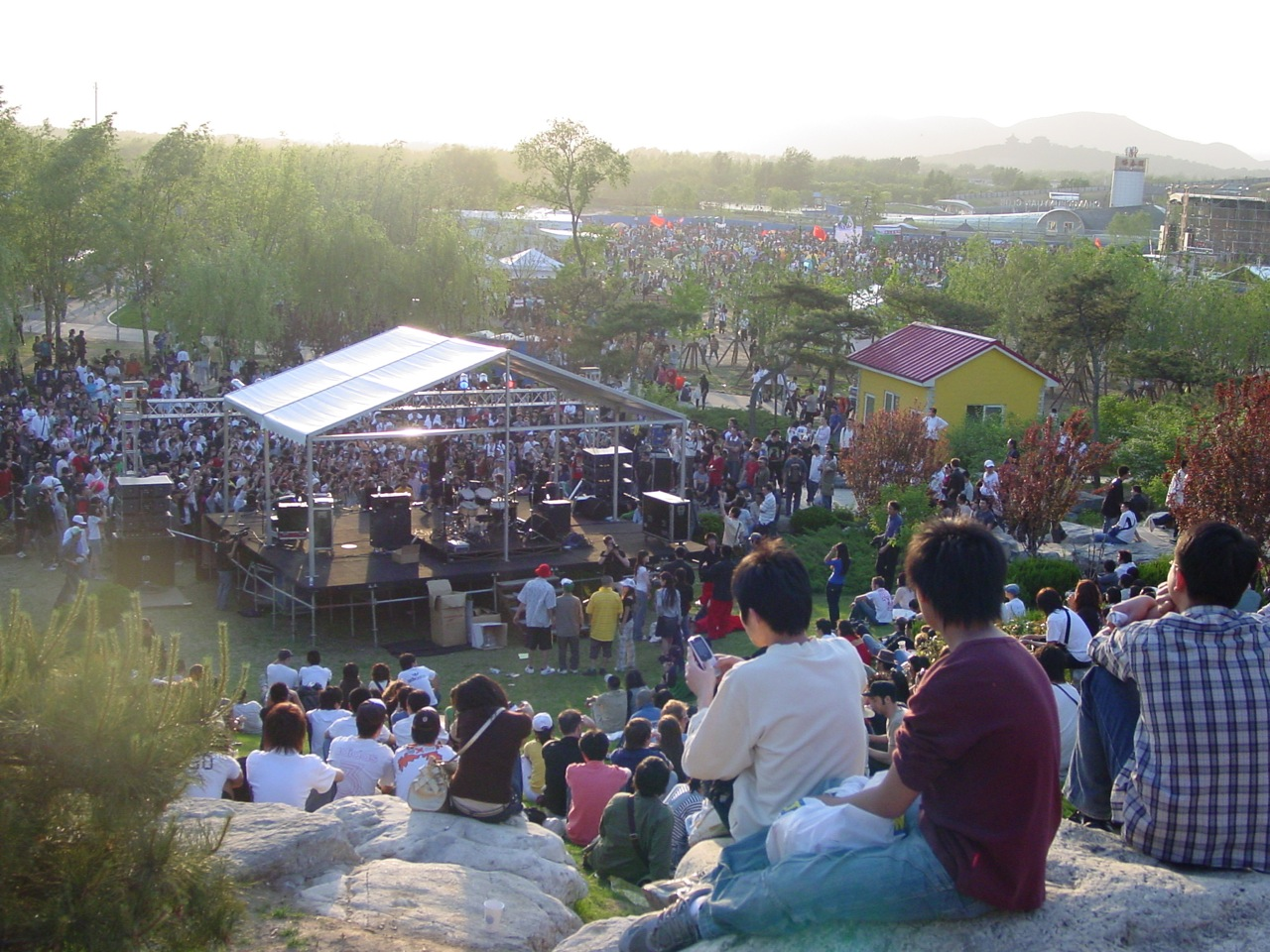
Midi Music Festival in Haidian Park (2007).

Haidian Park (海淀公园; pinyin: Hǎidiàn Gōngyuán) is a city park located in the northwestern Haidian District of Beijing, China. It is 40 hectares in area, and is located at the northwest corner of the Wanquanhe Intersection of the Northwest Fourth Ring Road.

The park comprises Changchun Park, Xihua Park, Quanzong Temple, and several other royal park sites. It contains several gardens, which contain rare species of plants.

Haidian Park is the location of the Midi Modern Music Festival, and the 2007 Beijing Jazz Festival was held there in September 2007.
