= Wasted Laika =

Chinese rock band

- Origin: Beijing, China
- Genres: Rock
- Years active: 2017-present
- Members: Tu Junnan (涂俊南); Li Tanghua (李堂华); Wang Xiaolong (王小龙); Zhao Yanqiao (赵彦樵); Zhang Yongguo (张永郭)
- Past members: Sun Xintong (孙欣彤); Ma Tiankong (马天空); Jiang Ziyan (蒋自言); Hu Xiaoyu (胡晓渔/阿驴); Chen Yichen (陈一陈); Wang Yingnan (王英男/阿勇)

Wasted Laika (Chinese: 丢莱卡) are a Chinese rock band, formed in Beijing in 2017. The band currently consists of Tu Junnan (vocals), Li Tanghua (guitar), Wang Xiaolong (guitar), Zhao Yanqiao (bass), and Zhang Yongguo (drums).

== History ==
In March 2017, the lead singer Tu Junnan came up with the name Wasted Laika after reading the story of the Soviet space dog Laika. Laika was originally a stray dog and was carried into space by a spacecraft called Sputnik 2 to be the first living animal in space. Back then, both of the founding members Tu Junnan and Li Tanghua were undergraduate students at Beijing Normal University. The two of them had already known each other for two years and played in the guitar club, but the band did not form until 2017.

After the formation of the band, Wasted Laika started performing very frequently. In January 2018, they went on a national tour that was fully self-designed, without signing with any record labels or management companies. The tour was named "思念宇宙" which means "Missing the Universe" and included 10 different cities. Only 6 months after their first tour, they were on the road again. Their second tour is called "健忘的平原", meaning "The Forgetful Plain".

Wasted Laika started their journey with two turbulent years from 2017 to 2019, experiencing intensive personnel changes. In the first two years, the band had more than ten members joining and leaving. Nevertheless, they kept performing intensively. In 2018, they were the band that performed the most shows at School Live Bar, one of the most famous live performance venues in Beijing.

In 2019, they released their first studio album 健忘的平原, which has the same name as their second tour. Also in 2019, the band finally had a stable line-up. Guitarist Wang Xiaolong, bassist Zhao Yanqiao, and drummer Zhang Yongguo joined and stayed in the band until today. In the following years, they had a few other national tours and special projects. They also started to devote themselves to performing together with other bands and discovering other young bands with high potential all over the country.

In the following years, they had a few other national tours and special projects. They also started to devote themselves to performing together with other bands and discovering other young bands with high potential all over the country.

In 2021, they released their second studio album 走神的卫星.

== Members ==
Current members

- Tu Junnan (涂俊南) – vocals (2017–present)
- Li Tanghua (李堂华) – guitar (2017–present)
- Wang Xiaolong (王小龙) – guitar (2019–present)
- Zhao Yanqiao (赵彦樵) – bass (2019–present)
- Zhang Yongguo (张永郭) – drums (2019–present)

Formers members

- Sun Xintong (孙欣彤) – drums (2017-2018)
- Ma Tiankong (马天空) – bass (2017)
- Jiang Ziyan (蒋自言) – guitar (2017-2018)
- Hu Xiaoyu (胡晓渔/阿驴) – drums (2018-2019)
- Chen Yichen (陈一陈) – bass (2018)
- Wang Yingnan (王英男/阿勇) – bass, guitar (2018-2019)

== Discography ==
Studio albums

- 健忘的平原 (2019)
- 走神的卫星 (2021)

== Tours ==
- 思念宇宙 (2018)
- 健忘的平原 (2018)
- 茫然摸象 (2019)
- 走神的卫星 (2018-2020)
- 小风波 (2019-2020)
- 搜光你的口袋 (2020): a joint tour with 脏手指 Oh! Dirty Fingers
- 突围! Vol.1 (2021): a joint tour with 小南瓜 Pumpkins
- 突围! Vol.2 (2021): a joint tour with 小王 Xiao Wang
- 年轻的士兵 (2021-2022)
- 突围! Vol.3 (2022): a joint tour with 赛吉来信 Sincerely yours, Sergei
