= Wan Xiaoli =

Chinese singer

Wan Xiaoli (万晓利; born 1971) is a folk-rock singer, song-writer, guitarist, and harmonica player from China. He is originally from Ci County, Handan, Hebei.

Wan Xiaoli was born on October 15, 1971, in Handan, Hebei Province. Raised in a rural environment, he developed an early affinity for music, teaching himself harmonica as a child after finding one at home. After graduating from a local technical college in 1991, Wan worked at a winery in his hometown while picking up guitar playing. During this time, he married and had a daughter, Wan Chang, who later contributed vocals to his recordings. In 1997 when he was 26, he moved to Beijing with his guitar and began to make a life as a bar musician. In 2014 he moved south and settled at the suburb of Hangzhou.

He has released five studio albums.

Wan was grouped with Zhou Yunpeng as a "realistic" songwriter conscious of societal changes and circumstances around the crowd. His 2002 song "Laid Off" (下岗了) gave a raw depiction of factory worker unemployment, reflecting 1990s state-owned enterprise reforms.

== Discography ==
- Walk Over Here, Walk Over There (Chinese: 走过来走过去) (2002)
- It’s Not As Bad As Imagined (Chinese: 这一切没有想象的那么糟) (2006)
- The North of the North (Chinese: 北方的北方) (2010)
- The Sun Looks Round (Chinese: 太阳看起来圆圆的) (2015)
- Ship of the Scales / Teeth, Spinach, and Tofu versus Poet, Tramp, and Disciple (Chinese: 天秤之舟/牙齿，菠菜和豆腐与诗人，流浪汉和门徒) (2017)
