= Chinese idol =

Type of Chinese musical celebrity

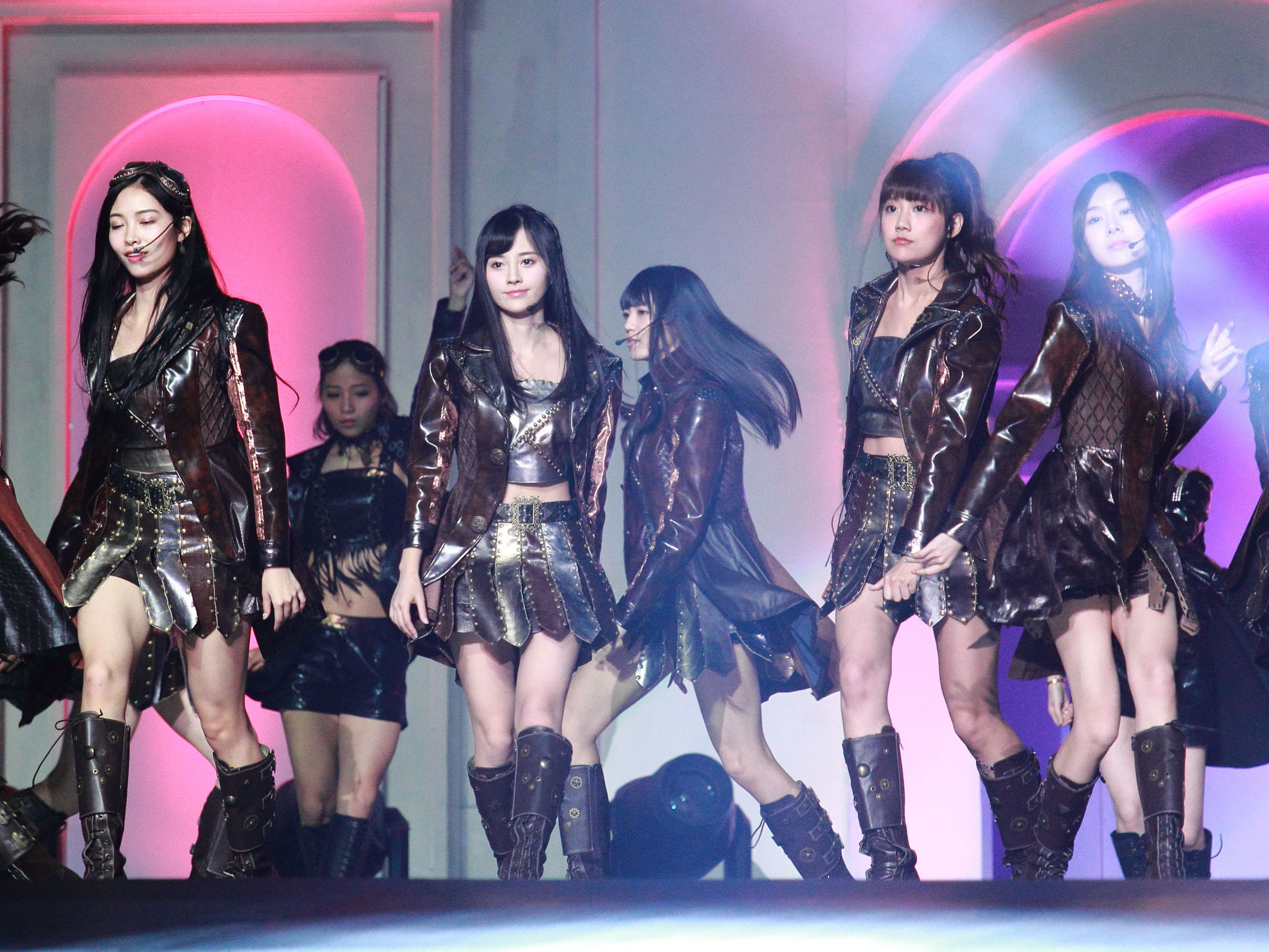
SNH48, one of the most popular Chinese idol groups

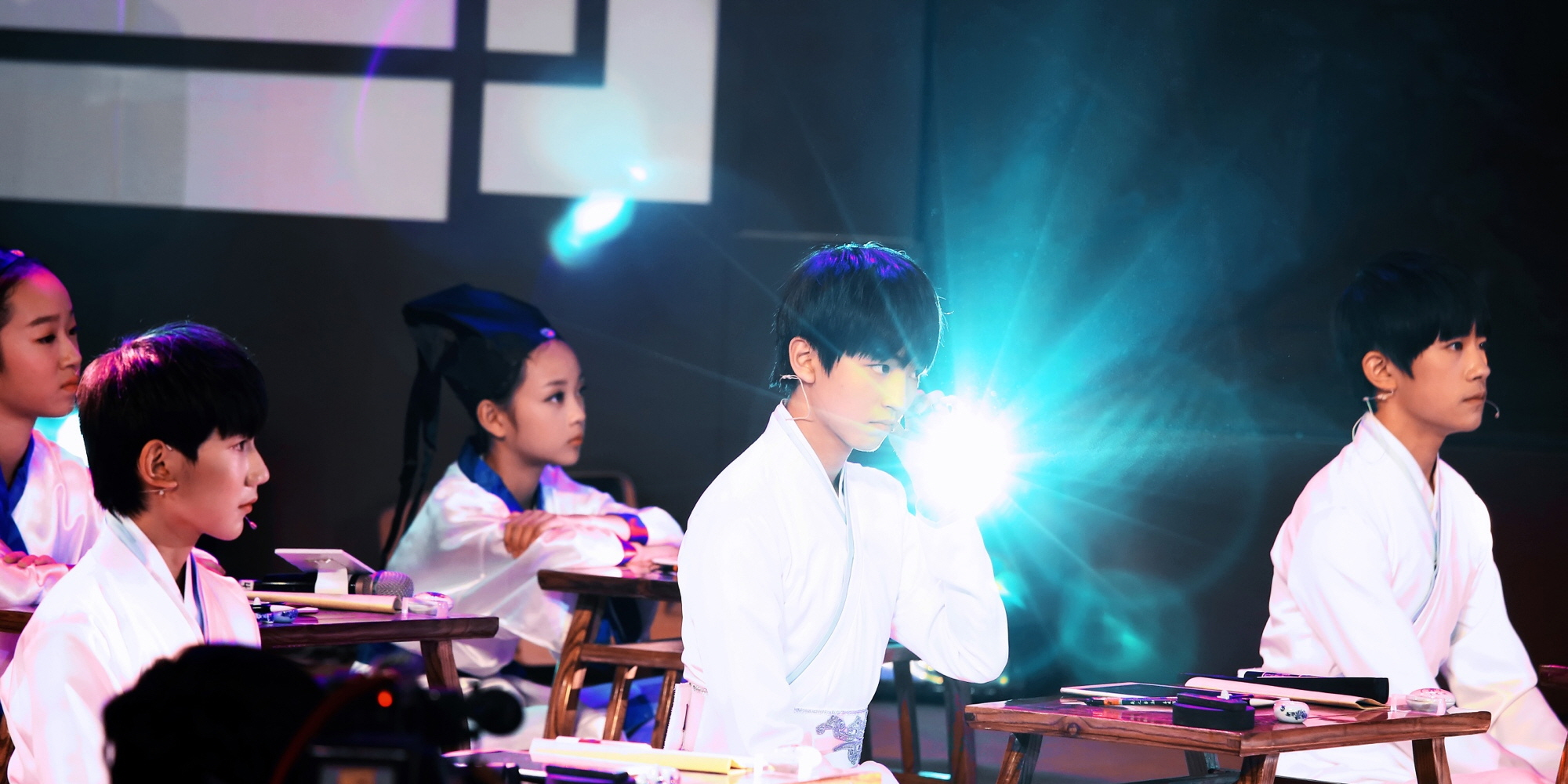
TFBoys in 2015

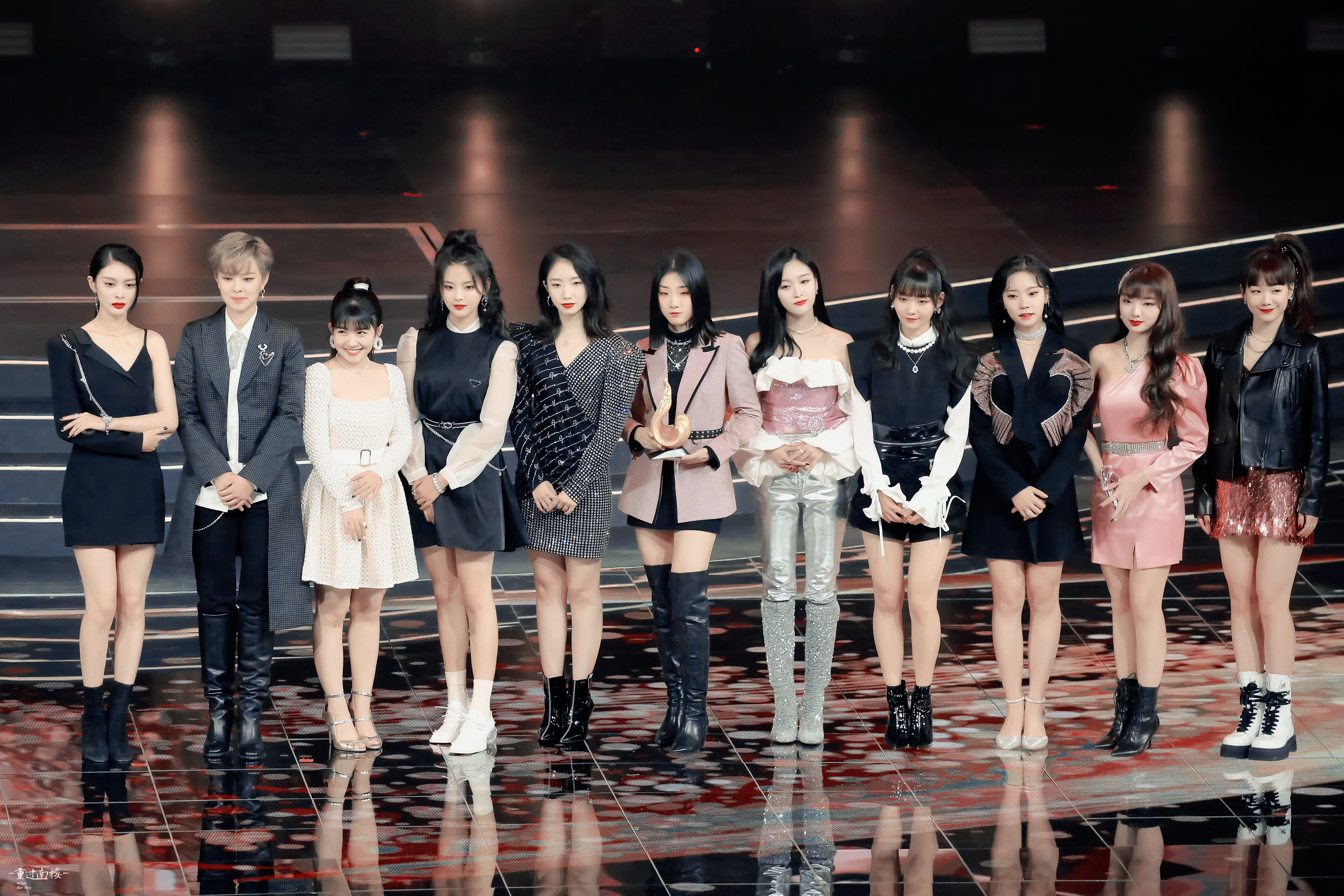
Rocket Girls 101 in 2020

The Chinese pop music industry has a growing trend of idols and idol groups, who are entertainers manufactured and marketed for their image and attractiveness. Idols are primarily singers (either as members of a group or as solo acts), but they are also trained in other roles, such as acting, dancing, and modeling. Unlike other celebrities, idols are promoted through merchandise and endorsements by talent agencies while maintaining a carefully curated public image and social media presence, as well as a strong parasocial connection with a passionate fan base through concerts and meetups.

== History ==
In the context of East Asian entertainment, an "idol" is a young entertainer, often in their teens through mid-twenties, who is marketed to develop a fan base with close affective and financial loyalty. The Chinese entertainment industry adopted the concept of "idols" from Japan and South Korea, where thousands of teenagers undergo years of training, and only a select few eventually debut in idol groups that generate income for their agencies through the release of musical records, sale of merchandise, brand endorsement deals, and concert revenue.

The early 2010s saw the rise in popularity of Japanese-style idol groups such as SNH48 and TFBoys. In 2014 and 2015, four Chinese members of the K-pop band Exo returned to China, contributing to the development of idols in China.

In 2016, relations between China and South Korea became tense because of the deployment of South Korea's THAAD system. In this environment, idols who had returned to China from foreign countries were viewed as patriotic and developed strong fan support. The phrase "no idols before the state" became a frequent slogan on social media used in support of idols deemed patriotic and in opposition to foreign celebrities viewed as being anti-China.

On January 27, 2017, some members of SNH48 performed on the CCTV New Year's Gala as backup dancers during a segment with Coco Lee and JJ Lin. This was the first appearance by an idol group at a major Chinese event. Korean idol groups such as Exo-M, SJ-M and T-ara also reached a larger audience through performances in China.

From 2018-2021, several online idol-making shows prompted significant growth of the idol concept in Chinese pop culture. The success of Chinese reality shows Idol Producer and Produce 101 China, produced by iQiyi and Tencent Video, has led commentators to label 2018 as the start of the Age of Idols. These shows feature about a hundred contestants undergoing training, performances, and eliminations through audience votes, culminating in a few debuting as idol band members. Together, the shows were viewed 8.07 billion times, creating buzzwords like "C-position" for the central role in a performance. Idol groups Nine Percent and Rocket Girls 101 debuted through these shows. Other idol competition shows Youth With You and Produce Camp 2019 followed in 2019.

== Government regulations ==
On September 2, 2021, China's National Radio and Television Administration cracked down on idol reality TV, going as far as to ban idol competition shows after multiple fandom controversies surrounding the massively popular idol talent show Youth With You 3, which was taken off air in May 2021.

As part of the Chinese government's wider crackdown on the technology and entertainment sectors, the National Radio and Television Administration included in an eight-point plan that "sissy idols," effeminate men, "overly entertaining" things are to be prohibited. The entertainment sector is to promote traditional and socialist culture, and establish "correct beauty standards". The Communist Party's propaganda department accused the entertainment industry of negatively influencing youth and polluting society. The Cyberspace Administration of China also called for an end to toxic celebrity fandom culture, with a 10-point plan which addresses stopping the spread of "harmful" information, gossip, and scandal within fan groups. The government has also prohibited the publication of celebrity ranking lists and the practice of charging fans to vote in celebrity reality competition shows.

== Fan cultural practices ==
As elsewhere in East Asia, it is common for Chinese fans to refer to male idols as "brother", connoting familiarity, love, and respect.

Sina Weibo is a major platform for Chinese fans to develop their sub-culture communities and engage in their fandom.

Fans of idols engage in various practices to improve their idols' visibility. The term "chart-beating" describes various practices through which fans promote their idols. Chart-beating practices include voting on online rankings to enhance an artist's visibility or purchasing digital content to increase their sales. Fans manage comments about their idols, collectively making and 'liking' positive comments to push negative ones down in visibility. Fans engage in fanhei (anti-criticism) to defend their idols from criticism, often through coordinated efforts including sales-data driven consumption. Online fan communities also organize teams to oppose anti-fans, mobilizing members to collectively report social media posts deemed detrimental to their idol.

In the broader Chinese public, idol fandom culture has a generally negative reputation. The phrase "fandom mindset" is frequently used in online discourses to criticize fans as "irrational" or "crazy". "Identifying fan domicile" (jianfenji) is an expression referring to non-fan's online practice of trying to identify whether someone is part of a relevant fandom before deeming them credible in online discourses.

== See also ==
- C-pop
- Korean idol
- Japanese idol
- Examples of Chinese idol groups
  - R1SE
  - Into1
