= Lonely China Day =

Chinese indie rock band

Lonely China Day (Chinese: 寂寞.夏.日; pinyin: jìmò xià rì) is a Chinese indie rock band from Beijing.

== Music ==
The marquee band of the Tag Team Records label, Lonely China Day has a sound that has been compared to that of Sigur Rós, due to a use of methodical, droning guitars and non-English lyrics. Lead singer Deng Pei performs in Mandarin, drawing some of his lyrics from ancient Chinese poetry. Deng Pei was a natural left-handed guitar player, but as he was not initially able to locate and acquire a left-handed guitar, he performed from the opposite side until he sustained an injury to his little finger, necessitating a change back to his natural side.

The band released their debut, an eponymous EP, with Tag Team in 2006, and followed up with their full-length debut, entitled Sorrow, in 2007. Allmusic gave Sorrow a largely positive review, awarding three stars out of a possible five. Reviewer Stewart Mason said that "fans of...ambitious neo-prog will likely find much to enjoy on Sorrow", but also noted that the album might seem inaccessible to casual listeners.

That same year, Lonely China Day performed at the South by Southwest festival in Austin, Texas.

Their second album, This Readily Assimilative People, was released on June 19, 2010.

== Members ==
- Deng Pei - vocals, guitar
- Wang Dongtao - guitar
- He Feng - bass guitar
- Luo Hao - drums
