= Silver Ash =

Chinese rock band

- Origin: China
- Genres: Gothic rock, glam rock, hard rock
- Years active: 2000–present
- Label: Scream Records
- Members: Ling (凌) (vocals); Yue (玥) (guitar); Zhen (桢) (drums); Cain (bass)
- Past members: Hong (虹) (bass); Lucy (guitar); Nancy (guitar); Yu (玉) (bass); Bai Niao (白鸟) (keyboard)
- Website: silverashofficial.com

Silver Ash (simplified Chinese: 银色灰尘; traditional Chinese: 銀色灰塵; pinyin: Yínsè huīchén) is a visual rock band from China influenced by the Japanese visual kei movement. They formed in the year 2000 and are located in Beijing. Their music is a mix of British rock, hard rock, glam rock and goth rock. After several member changes and a couple years of inactivity, Silver Ash currently consists of original members Ling (vocals) and Zhen (drums), guitarist Yue, and bassist Cain. They are known as the first Chinese visual rock band and have played a significant role in increasing the movement's popularity in China.

== History ==
The original line-up of Silver Ash included Ling (vocals), Lucy (guitar), Nancy (guitar), Hong (bass), and Zhen (drums). The band was produced by the Gorgeous Devil Studio and Scream Records from 2000 to 2005. Guitarist Nancy left the group before they signed to Scream Records. They toured China in 2002, performing in ten cities including Beijing, Shanghai, Guangzhou, and Chongqing. In 2005, they chose to leave Scream Records and were without a record label (and still are). Due to personal reasons, some of the Silver Ash members were forced to leave the band.

Guitarist Lucy was replaced by Yue. After much deliberation, Hong had to leave the band and was replaced by new bassist Yu. From there, they added Bai Niao (White Bird), on keyboard. Previously, Bai Niao was the vocalist and keyboardist of another Chinese visual rock band called Frozen Blood (冻结的血液).

Silver Ash has faced a lot of difficulties. The other band members had left Silver Ash temporarily to pursue their careers, leaving only Ling for a short period of time. They were also scheduled to tour the US in 2003–2004, but it was canceled due to the SARS scare. It was last heard that they were still without a record label as well, but were given various offers from Japanese record labels such as Avex Trax. They were previously signed to Toshiba-EMI but were released from the contract again due to government problems. They have not released an album since 2005, citing the slumping economy and reluctant record label companies.

Silver Ash held a live on August 30, 2006, with Japanese band La'cryma Christi, particularly to be viewed by the production company Sweet Child. They have also performed with the Japanese bands Rice and Gram∞Maria.

=== Relaunch of activities ===
In 2011, Silver Ash released a limited 1000-run press of a new single, "Pretty But Evil". The international digital release of the track on January 4, 2013, inaugurated the beginning of their comeback. They are currently working on a new release which is slated to drop sometime in March or April 2013, for which there will be both English and Japanese versions in addition to their native Chinese. They are currently being represented by EINSOF Marketing Group.

== Discography ==
- Pretty But Evil (2011)
1. Pretty But Evil
2. Cosmo
3. MV: Control-live
- 未尽集 (6/2005)
1. White Dream (白色的梦)
2. 依赖 (Rely)
3. 独舞 (Dancing Alone)
4. 雪痕 (Snow Track)
5. 樱雪 (Flowering Cherry Snow)
6. 月残 X 樱雪 remix (Lunar Eclipse + Flowering Cherry Snow Remix)
7. 珊瑚泪 (Coral's Tear)
8. 葬花吟 (Flower Funeral Song)
9. SAD SONG (伤心的歌)
10. 眩觉 (Feeling Dizzy)
- 蝶变: Out of Control (2004/5)
1. Control 控制
2. Return 回歸
3. Cry 泣
4. 蝶变 (Metamorphosis)
5. 午夜 (Midnight)
6. 殇 (Die Young [lit. Dying Before Your Time])
- Never End (2003/1/2)
1. 序曲 (Overture)
2. 眠 (dormancy)
3. Seduction
4. Never End
5. Never End (instruments only)
- 羽翼之祈愿篇 Home Video (2002)
1. MV：Liar
2. Home Video
3. MV：月残
- Silver Ash (2002/1/25)
1. Gorgeous Devil
2. 风琴 (Organum)
3. 谁 (Who)
4. Liar
5. 风之断崖 (Wind of the Broken Cliff)
6. 月残 (Lunar Eclipse)
7. 弥沙 (Suffused Sand)
8. Twins-双生
9. 疏远 (Estrange)
10. 6月24日-望 (Demo) (June 24: Look)
- 风琴 (2001/8/30)
1. 月残 (Lunar Eclipse)
2. 风琴 (Organum)
3. 双生 (Twins)
4. Storm Blast

Home Video (Live)【残月夜】
