= Painkiller (magazine) =

Chinese heavy metal music magazine

- Editor: Romulus Cheung
- Categories: Music magazine
- Frequency: Bi-Monthly
- Total circulation: 12,000 - 15,000 (ABC Jan-Jun 07)
- Founder: Yang Yu, Zakk Wu, Han Ning
- Founded: 2000
- Country: People's Republic of China
- Based in: Beijing
- Language: Chinese
- Website: Official website

Painkiller (Chinese: 重型音乐; pinyin: Zhòngxíng Yīnyuè; lit. 'Heavy Duty Music') is China's first heavy music magazine. It is a legally registered enterprise for print media productions by Chinese State Authority.

Based in Beijing, it was founded in September 2000 and started off publishing quarterly; the frequency in 2006, is one issue every two months.

Their current average circulation is 40,000 copies; sold in all major cities of mainland China (Beijing, Chengdu, Xi'an, etc.), as well as Hong Kong and Taiwan.

The magazine's language is Chinese, and has correspondents, foreign editors and contributors in the USA, UK, and Germany for interviews, foreign news, and features. The magazine has a front cover with the title in Chinese and a back cover with the title in English; normal publication is 204 pages in full color with a fold out color poster.

Every issue also has a cover CD and a 'Metal In China' section which promotes and introduces bands on the local Chinese heavy metal scene in which several city scenes are presented and Chinese heavy metal is explained including its function as a 'rebellion of denial' due to the new sound movement.

The content focuses on articles and interviews, photographs of live concerts from around the world and in China, CD reviews, and posters – mainly with foreign metal bands from the genres: heavy metal, power metal, progressive metal, nu metal, hard rock, metalcore, darkwave/gothic/industrial, hard core, thrash metal, death metal, black metal, grindcore, etc.

Further activities include the support of the local metal underground, the organization of concerts, CD distribution throughout China, and certain internet activities. Painkiller co-promoted the German band, Edguy, for a concert in Beijing in March 2006 which marked the begin of Painkiller as promoter and live show producer in China. The China Daily called Painkiller "one of the most important metal show promoters in China". Alongside Midi Productions, it organizes the Midi Music Festival.

Previous cover artists in 2005-2006 have been:

- PK17 : Front cover – montage of Anthrax, Arch Enemy, Sentenced & H.I.M. / Back cover – Nevermore
- PK18 : Front cover – Soulfly / Back cover – Children Of Bodom –
- PK19 : Front cover – Destruction / Back cover – Nightwish
- PK20 : Front cover – Lacuna Coil / Back cover – Naglfar
- PK21 : Front Cover – Alice Cooper / Back cover – Satyricon

== Bibliography ==
- Wang, Yuan (2017). Observations on the Chinese metal scene (1990–2013): history, identity, industry, and social interpretation (PDF) (PhD thesis). University of Glasgow. Archived from the original (PDF) on 2023-09-25.
