= Wan Li Ma Wang =

Chinese rock band

- Origin: Beijing, China
- Genres: Classic rock
- Years active: 1979–1983
- Past members: Wan Xing; Li Shichao; Ma Xiaoyi; Wang Xinbo

Wan Li Ma Wang
- Traditional Chinese: 萬李馬王/萬里馬王
- Simplified Chinese: 万李马王/万里马王
- Hanyu Pinyin: Wàn Lǐ Mǎ Wáng
- Literal meaning: A combination of the group members' surnames
Transcriptions
Standard Mandarin
- Hanyu Pinyin: Wàn Lǐ Mǎ Wáng

Wan Li Ma Wang is a Chinese rock band formed in 1979, considered one of the oldest rock groups originating in China. The band was set up by four university students from Beijing, Wan Xing, Li Shichao, Ma Xiaoyi and Wang Xinbo. The group name was a derivative of the combination of the group members' surnames.

The band made their public debut in the winter of 1979, when the four performed at the university joint show. They covered songs of the Beatles, Paul Simon, Rolling Stones and the like, which was a contrast to other students' performances — usually recitations or choruses in English. The band played mainly covers of other bands, which was a novelty to China during the late 1970s. Its debut was reported by CRI and the group subsequently held live concerts in other Beijing-based Chinese universities. It was not long before the band was eventually dissolved, when the four members graduated.

== Bibliography ==
1. Steen, Andreas (1996). Der Lange Marsch des Rock 'n' Roll: Pop- und Rockmusik in der Volksrepublik China. Volume 32 of Berliner China-Studien (in German). Münster: LIT Verlag. p. 77. ISBN 9783825829414.
2. Quotidien du Peuple (People's Daily) (18 February 2004). "Le rock en Chine A l'état embryonnaire". CRI China Radio International (in French). p. 17.
3. "Annexes" (PDF). Université Jean Moulin-Lyon III (thesis) (in French). 2008.
4. Davis, Edward L., ed. (2009). Encyclopedia of Contemporary Chinese Culture. Encyclopedias of Contemporary Culture. Taylor & Francis. p. 711. ISBN 9780415777162.
5. KEA (January 2011). "Mapping the Cultural and Creative Sectors in the EU and China: A Working Paper in support to the development of an EU-China Cultural and Creative Industries' (CCIs) platform" (PDF).
6. Huang, Yingxue (3 September 2012). "Yaogun, l'histoire de la musique Rock Made in China: Création, évolution, et perspectives de la musique rock en Chine contemporaine (1980 - 2011)" (PDF). Université de Lyon – Jean Moul in Lyon (Doctor thesis) (in French).
7. Clark, Paul (2012). Youth Culture in China: From Red Guards to Netizens. Cambridge University Press. ISBN 9781107016514.
8. RICHARD, Olivier (2 May 2013). "Does the music industry in China have a future?". INA Global.
9. Yu, Qing (1 August 2013). "Rooted in the 1980s". Neweekly. No. 400.
