= Midi Music Festival =

Chinese rock music festival

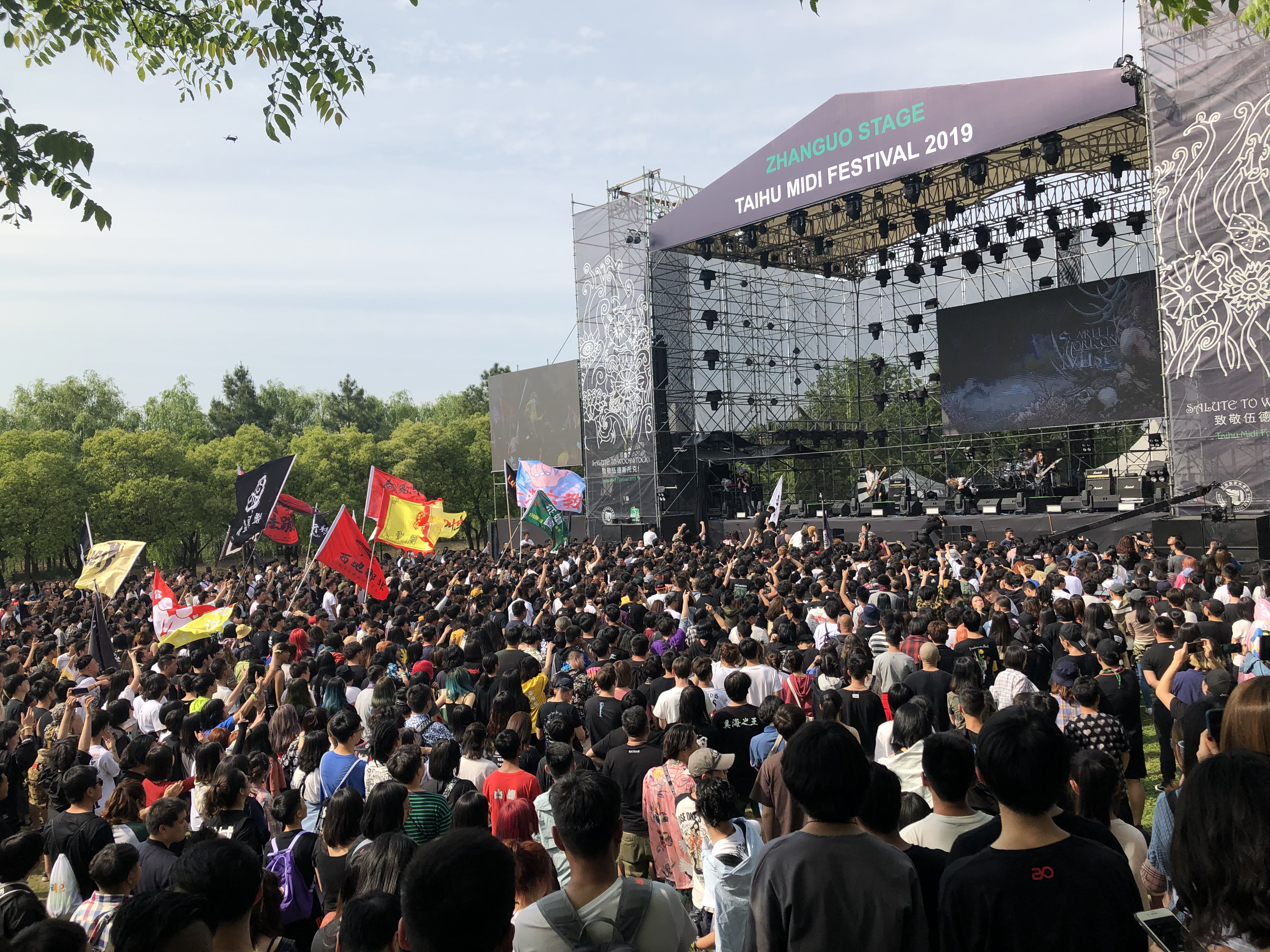
2019 Taihu Midi Festival hold in Suzhou

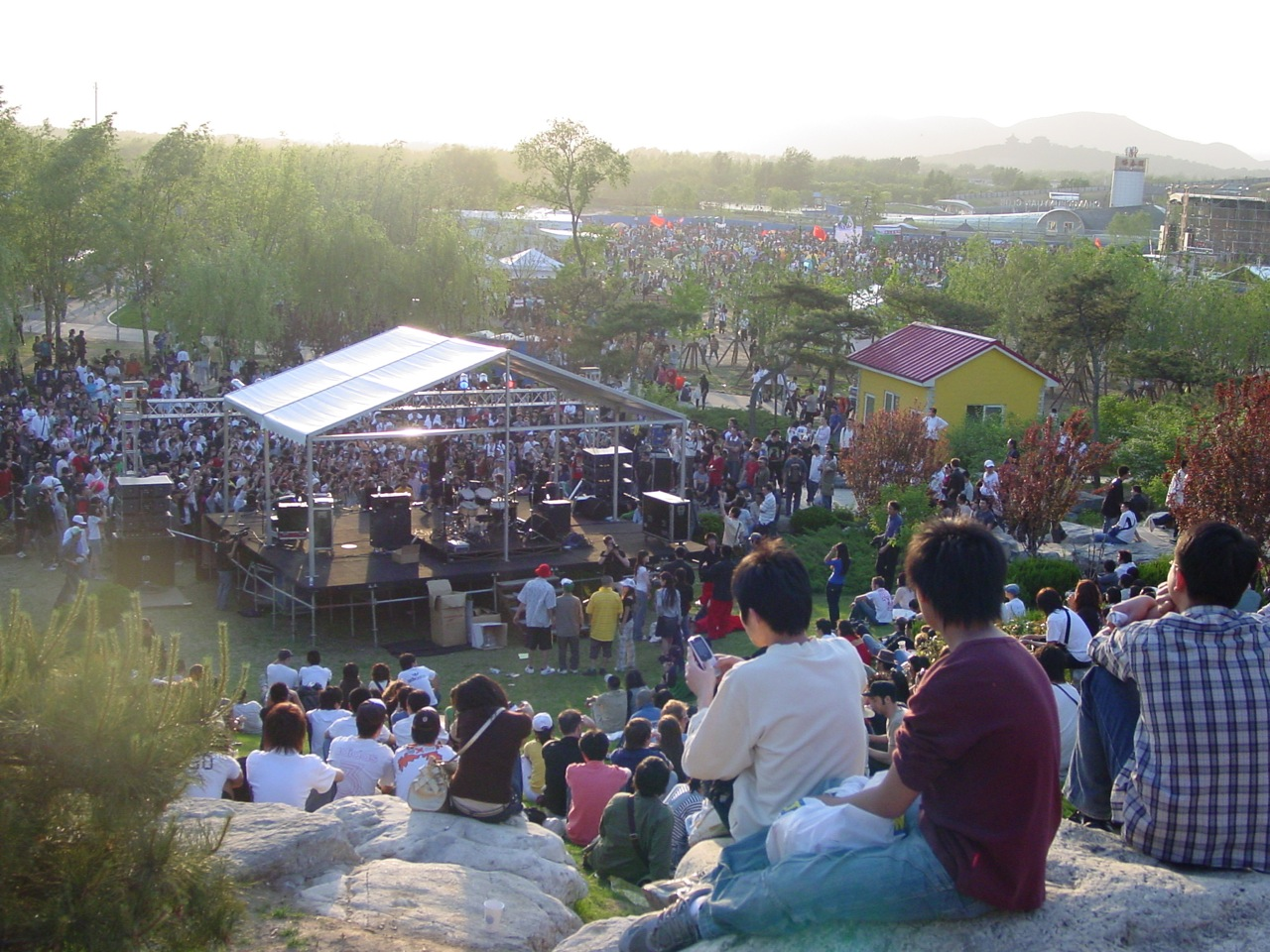
A performance at the 2007 Midi Music Festival

The Midi Music Festival, sometimes also called Midi Modern Music Festival or simply Midi Festival (Chinese: 迷笛音乐节; pinyin: Mídí Yīnyuè Jié) is among China's largest rock music festivals and is hosted by the Beijing Midi School of Music. Since its inauguration in 1997 it has been held each year in Beijing during the May Day holiday (May 1–3), with some breaks in 2003, 2004 and 2008 (all times held in October). Currently, it change to (April 28 to May 1). The 2008 festival was delayed to October for reasons related to the 2008 Summer Olympics, and in 2020 and 2021 they were cancelled due to COVID. The festival currently is held annually in four Chinese cities: Beijing, Shanghai, Suzhou and Shenzhen.

The 2006 festival, held in Beijing's Haidian Park, hosted 40-80 thousand visitors, and featured performances by more than 50 bands (including 18 foreign bands, such as Alev, Monokino, Yokohama Music Association, The Wombats, and The Mayflies) performing on four stages (Main Stage, Guitarchina Stage, Mini Midi Stage, and Disco Stage). The artists represented the genres of rock, electro, and DJ. The 2007 festival included UK acts the Crimea, Kava Kava (band), Dave Stewart of the Eurythmics, and Soundtrack Of Our Lives.

The festival regularly features environmental themes as their slogan, such as raising awareness for animals threatened with extinction and PM2.5 for their 2012 festivals.

Since 2008, Rock in China is providing the English language website for the Midi Modern Music Festival.

The Australian band The On Fires played at the 2011 festival.

The 2011 festival featured Japanese band GOOD4NOTHING. They were the first to perform 16 times.

The 2012 festival featured Australian band Arcane Saints and French band La Souris Déglinguée.

== See also ==
- Beijing Jazz Festival
- Beijing Pop Festival
- Chinese rock
- Modern Sky Festival
