= List of festivals in Asia =

Festivals of Asia
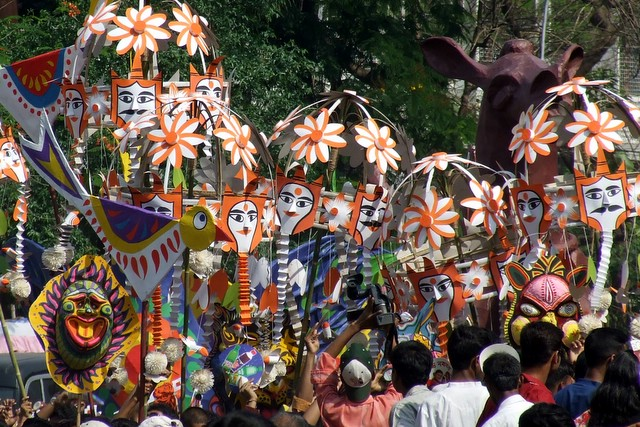

General Information
- Subtopics: List of festivals, list of music festivals, list of film festivals
- Location: Asia
- Related topics: Culture of Asia

The following is a list of festivals in Asia, with links to separate lists by country and region where applicable. This list includes festivals of diverse types, including regional festivals, commerce festivals, film festivals, folk festivals, carnivals, recurring festivals on holidays, and music festivals. Music festivals are annotated "(music)" for countries where there is not a dedicated music section.

This list has overlap with List of film festivals in Asia.

== Sovereign states ==
=== Afghanistan ===
- Nowruz in Afghanistan
- Baloch-Pakhtun Unity Day

=== Armenia ===
- Dolma Festival in Armenia (cultural heritage, gastronomy)
- Golden Apricot Yerevan International Film Festival (film)
- MetalFront Fest (music)
- Pan-Armenian Games (sports)
- ReAnimania International Animation Film & Comics Art Festival of Yerevan
- Yerevan International Film Festival (film)

=== Azerbaijan ===
- Baku International Film Festival East-West (film)
- Baku International Tourism Film Festival (film)
- Chaharshanbe Suri
- Goychay Pomegranate Festival
- Nowruz
- Yaldā

==== Music festivals in Azerbaijan ====
- Baku International Jazz Festival
- Gabala International Music Festival
- International World of Mugham Festival
- Mstislav Rostropovich Baku International Festival
- Mugham Festival
- Uzeyir Hajibeyov International Music Festival

=== Bahrain ===
- Public holidays in Bahrain

=== Bangladesh ===
- Public holidays in Bangladesh
- List of festivals in Bangladesh

=== Bhutan ===
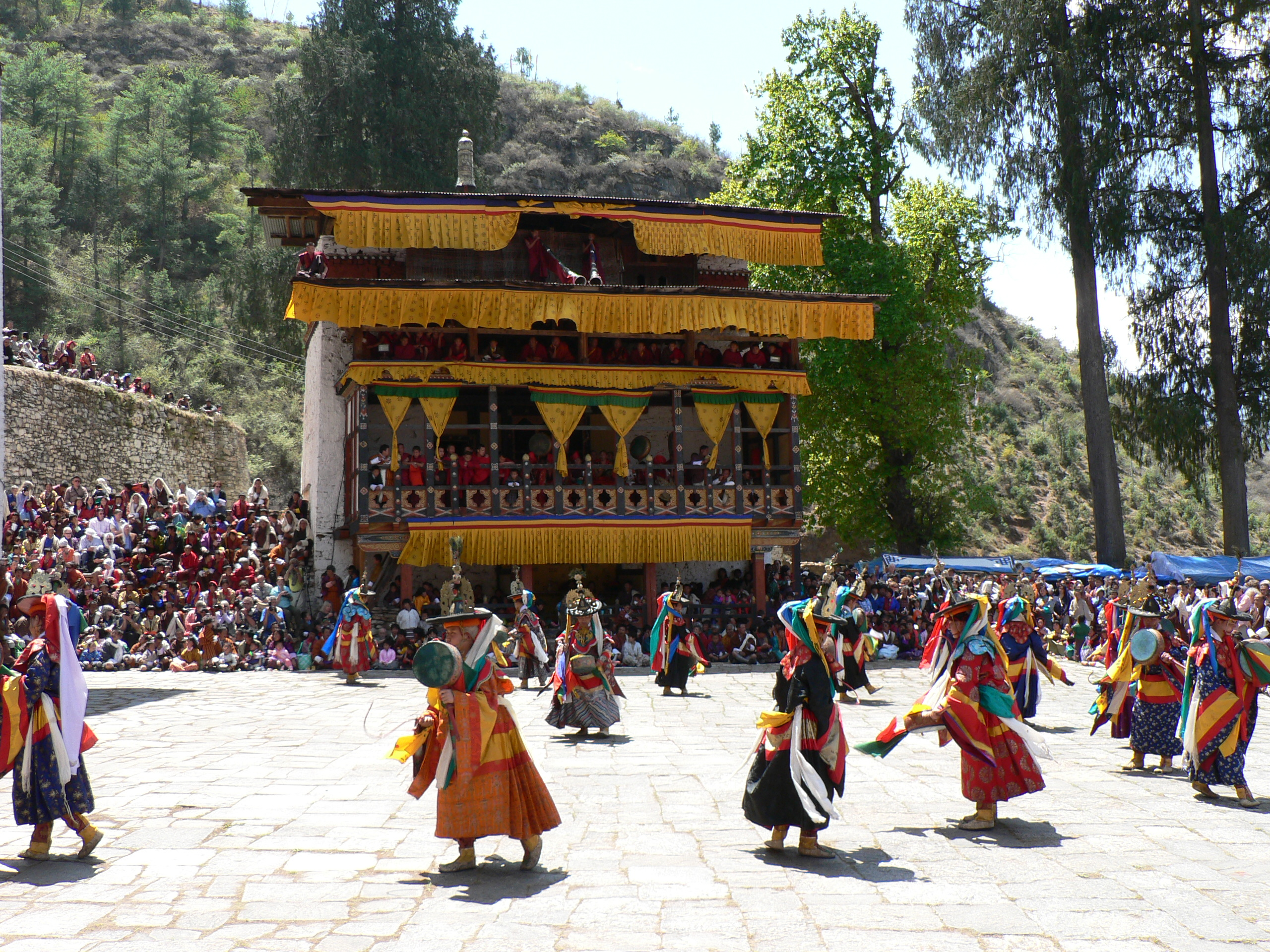
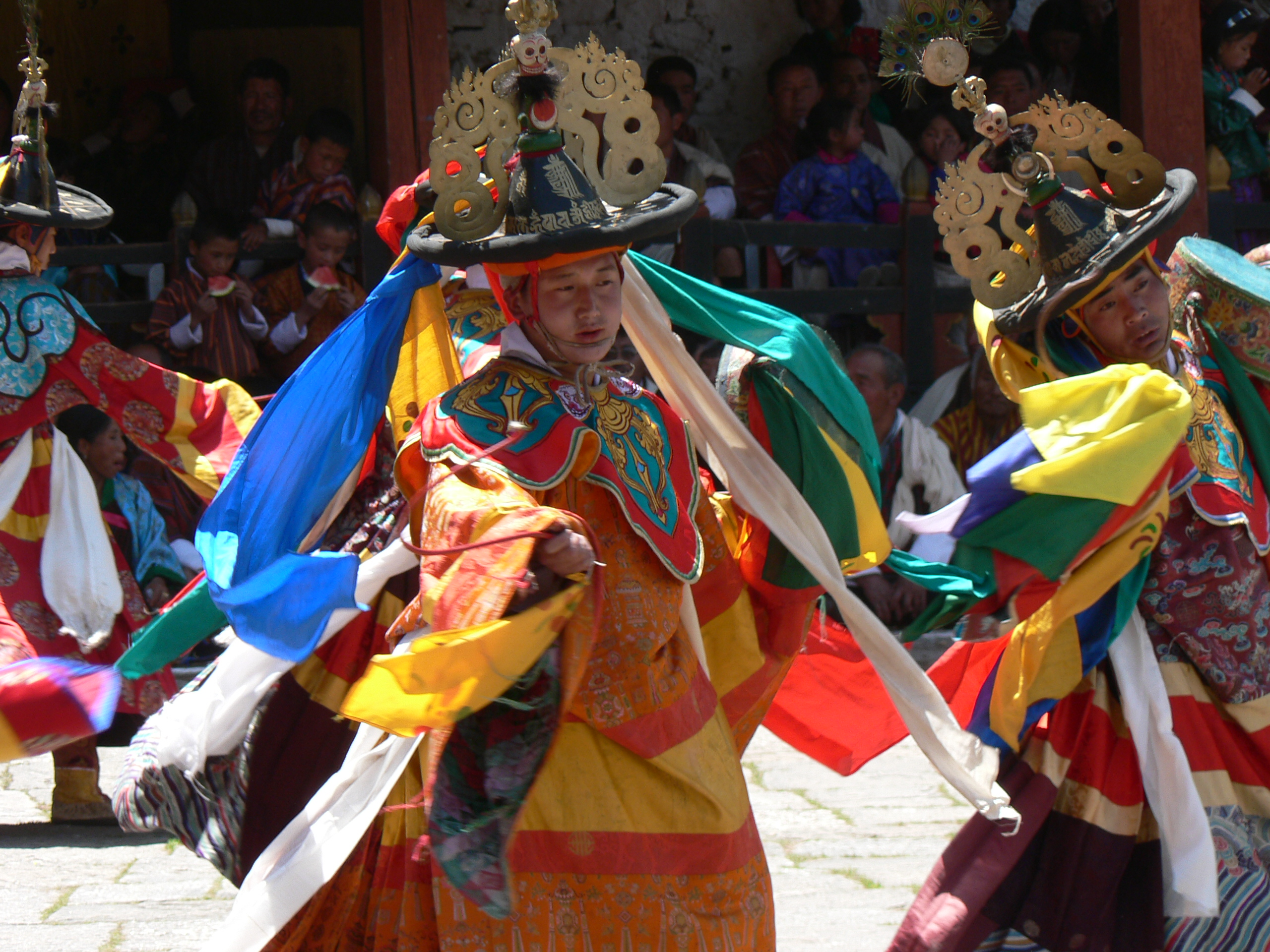
Left: Dance of the Black Hats with Drums. Right: Paro Tsechu festival of dances
- Public holidays in Bhutan
- Tshechu

=== Brunei ===
- Public holidays in Brunei

=== Cambodia ===
- Asalha Puja
- Bon Om Touk
- CamboFest, Cambodia Film Festival (film)
- Magha Puja
- Pchum Ben

=== China ===
- Chinese New Year
- Chinese Lantern Festival
- Dragon Boat Festival or Duanwu Festival
- Mid-Autumn Festival

=== East Timor (Timor-Leste) ===
- Public holidays in East Timor

=== India ===
- List of festivals in India
  - List of Indian classical music festivals
  - List of literary festivals in India
  - List of religious festivals in India
    - List of festivals of Maharashtrian Brahmins
    - List of Sikh festivals
    - List of Sindhi festivals
    - List of Hindu festivals
    - Public Holidays in India
      - List of Hindu festivals in Punjab

Lists by region

  - List of fairs and festivals in Punjab
- List of festivals of West Bengal

=== Indonesia ===
- List of festivals in Indonesia

=== Iran ===
- List of festivals in Iran

=== Iraq ===
- Duhok International Film Festival (film)
- Iraq Short Film Festival (film)
- Kha b-Nisan
- Nowruz

=== Israel ===
- Acco Festival of Alternative Israeli Theatre (theater)
- Boombamela
- Culture of peace festival
- Eilat Pride
- Hebrew Book Week
- Herzliya Biennial
- ICon festival
- Israel Defense Forces parade
- Israel Festival
- Jerusalem Festival of Light
- Jerusalem gay pride parade
- Jerusalem International Book Forum
- Tel Aviv Pride

==== Music festivals in Israel ====
- List of music festivals in Israel

==== Film festivals in Israel ====
- Docaviv
- Eilat International Film Festival
- Haifa International Film Festival
- Jerusalem Film Festival
- Tel Aviv International Student Film Festival
- TLVFest

=== Japan ===
- Japanese festivals (traditional/cultural)
- List of festivals in Japan
  - Festivals in Tokyo
  - Kamakura's festivals and events
  - Ryukyuan festivals and observances

=== Jordan ===
- Al-Balad Music Festival (music)
- Jerash Festival
- New Think Festival

=== Kazakhstan ===
- Eurasia International Film Festival (film)
- International Astana Action Film Festival (film)
- Shaken's Stars (film)
- Voice of Asia (music)

=== North Korea ===
- Festivals of Korea (traditional festivals and holidays)
- Modern Korean festivals (by region)
  - 13th World Festival of Youth and Students
  - Arirang Festival

=== South Korea ===
- List of modern Korean festivals (by region)
  - List of film festivals in South Korea
  - List of music festivals in South Korea
  - List of fireworks festivals in South Korea
    - Busan International Fireworks Festival
    - Seoul International Fireworks Festival
- List of traditional Korean festivals

=== Kuwait ===
- Qurain Cultural Festival

=== Kyrgyzstan ===
- Public holidays in Kyrgyzstan

=== Laos ===
- List of festivals in Laos

=== Lebanon ===
- Baalbeck International Festival (music)
- Beirut Nights (music)
- Beirut Rock Festival (music)
- Beiteddine Festival (music)
- Byblos International Festival (music)
- Coma Dance Festival (music)
- Ehmej Festival (music)
- Eid il-Burbara

=== Malaysia ===
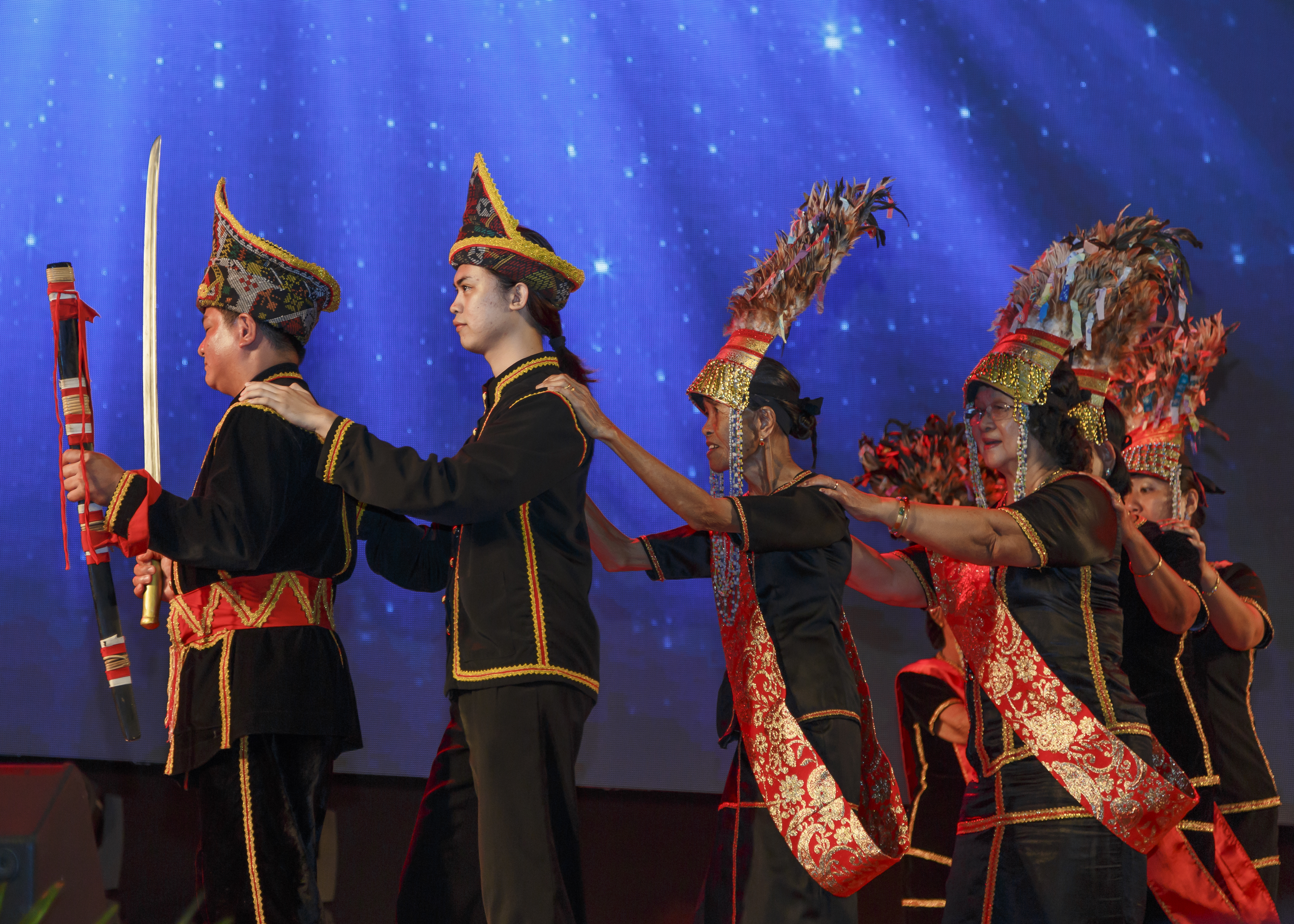
Kaamatan celebrations in Penampang, Sabah, Malaysia on 2014.

- List of festivals in Malaysia

=== Maldives ===
- Public holidays in the Maldives

=== Mongolia ===
- Eagle festival
- Garid
- Naadam (traditional sports)
- Nadun
- Tsagaan Sar

=== Myanmar ===
- Irrawaddy Literary Festival
- Kathina
- List of Burmese traditional festivals
- Magha Puja
- Pagoda festival
- Tazaungdaing festival
- Thadingyut Festival
- Thingyan
- Yadana Cave Festival
- Wathann Film Fest (film)

=== Nepal ===
- List of festivals in Nepal

=== Oman ===
- Public holidays in Oman

=== Pakistan ===
- List of festivals in Pakistan
  - List of festivals in Lahore
  - List of festivals in Multan

=== Philippines ===
- List of festivals in the Philippines

=== Qatar ===
- Doha Tribeca Film Festival (film)
- Public holidays in Qatar

=== Russia ===
- List of festivals in Russia

=== Saudi Arabia ===
- Jenadriyah
- Public holidays in Saudi Arabia

=== Singapore ===
- List of festivals in Singapore

=== Sri Lanka ===
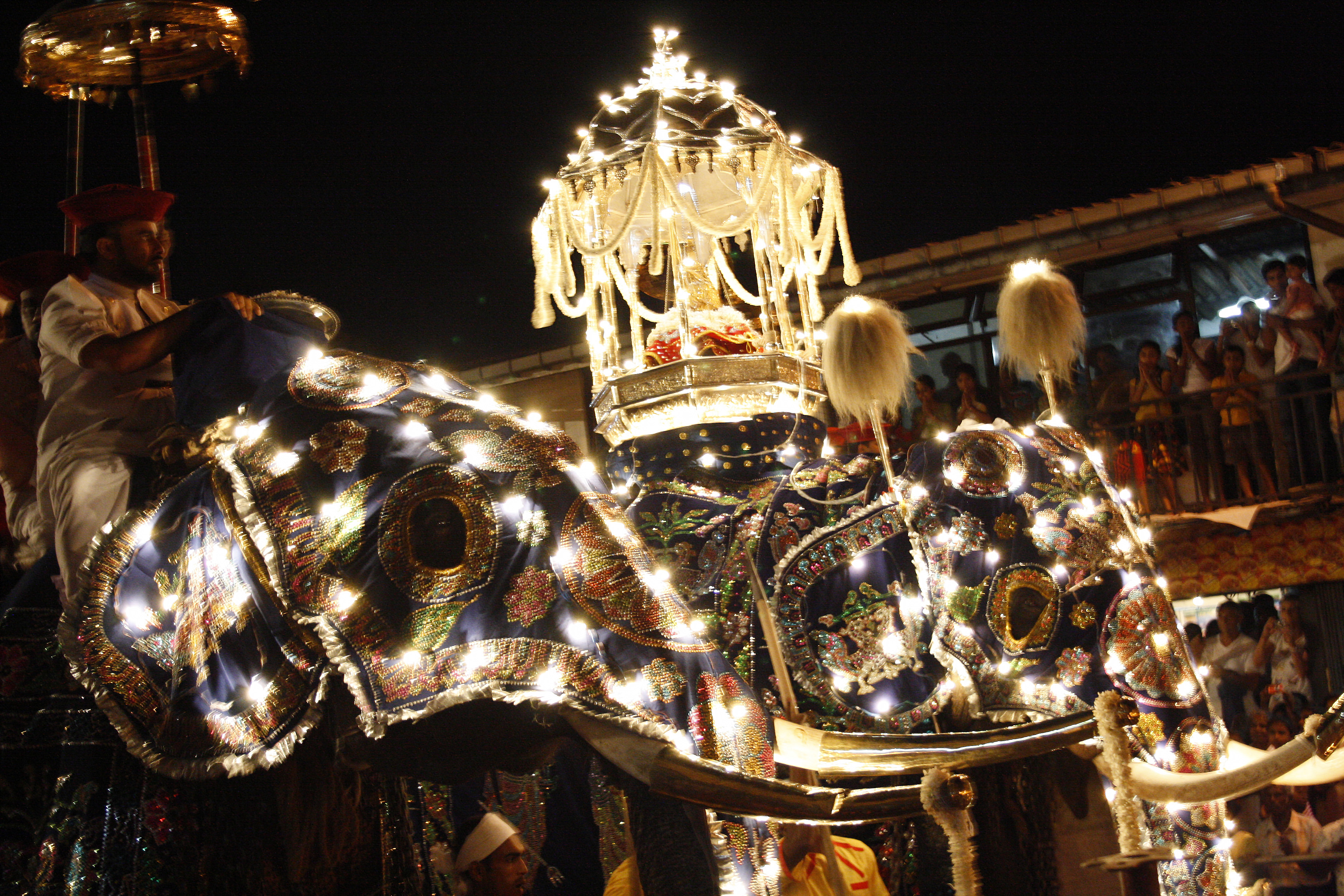
Traditional festival in Sri Lanka

- Aluth Sahal Mangallaya
- Asalha Puja
- Full Moon Poya Festivals
- Esala Mangallaya
- Kandy Esala Perahera
- List of traditional festivals in Sri Lanka
- Magha Puja
- Saga (music)
- Sinhalese New Year

=== Syria ===
- 2008 Arab Capital of Culture
- Damascus International Film Festival (film)
- Dox Box
- Eid il-Burbara
- Kha b-Nisan
- Nowruz
- Thursday of the Dead

=== Tajikistan ===
- Didor International Film Festival
- Public holidays in Tajikistan

=== Thailand ===
- Asalha Puja
- Bo Sang
- Chiang Mai Flower Festival
- Inthakin
- Kathin Festival
- Kathina
- Khon Kaen Silk Festival
- Loi Krathong
- Magha Puja
- Monkey Buffet Festival
- Nine Emperor Gods Festival
- Phi Ta Khon
- Poy Sang Long
- Rocket Festival
- Royal Flora Ratchaphruek
- Sat Thai
- Songkran (Thailand)
- Surin Elephant Round-up
- Thai Royal Guards parade
- Ubon Ratchathani Candle Festival
- Vassa
- Vegetarian Festival (Phuket)
- Wan Ok Phansa

==== Film festivals in Thailand ====
- Bangkok International Film Festival
- Bangkok Gay and Lesbian Film Festival
- Thai Short Film and Video Festival
- World Film Festival of Bangkok

==== Music festivals in Thailand ====
- Bangkok Jazz Festival
- Full Moon Party
- Hua Hin Jazz Festival

=== Turkey ===
- List of festivals in Turkey

=== Turkmenistan ===
- Public holidays in Turkmenistan

=== United Arab Emirates ===
- Abu Dhabi Festival
- Abu Dhabi International Book Fair
- Abu Dhabi Science Festival
- Dubai Lynx International Advertising Festival
- Dubai Shopping Festival
- Dubai World Games Expo
- Emirates Airline Festival of Literature (literary)
- Sharjah International Book Fair
- UAE Awafi Festival

==== Film festivals in the United Arab Emirates ====
- Abu Dhabi Film Festival
- Children's International Film Festival
- Dubai International Film Festival
- Middle East Film and Comic Con
- Tropfest Arabia

==== Music festivals in the United Arab Emirates ====
- Coma Dance Festival
- Dubai Desert Rock Festival
- Dubai International Jazz Festival
- Dubai Music Week
- Dubai Opera Ball

=== Uzbekistan ===
- Asrlar Sadosi Festival of Traditional Culture
- Public holidays in Uzbekistan

=== Vietnam ===
- Coca-Cola SoundFest (music)
- Dalat Flower Festival
- Hùng Kings' Festival
- Hội Yến Diêu Trì
- Gióng Festival
- Tết Nguyên Đán
- Tết Nguyên Tiêu
- Tết Hàn Thực
- Tết Đoan Ngọ
- Tết Trung Nguyên
- Tết Trung Thu

=== Yemen ===
- Public holidays in Yemen

== States with limited recognition ==
=== Abkhazia ===
- Public holidays in Abkhazia

=== Nagorno-Karabakh ===
- Culture of Nagorno-Karabakh

=== Northern Cyprus ===
- Public holidays in Northern Cyprus

=== Palestine ===
- Culture of Palestine
- Palestine Festival of Literature
- Bet Lahem Live Festival

=== South Ossetia ===
- Culture of South Ossetia

=== Taiwan ===
- Double Ninth Festival
- Ghost Festival
- The Harvest Festival in Taiwan
- Lantern Festival
- Pulima Art Festival
- Qing Shan King Sacrificial Ceremony
- Taiwan Lantern Festival
- Taiwan Youth Day
- Weiya
- Yanshui District
- Yilan International Children's Folklore and Folkgame Festival

==== Film festivals in Taiwan ====
- Golden Horse Film Festival and Awards
- Taipei Film Festival
- Women Make Waves

==== Music festivals in Taiwan ====
- Beigang International Music Festival
- Formoz Festival
- Hohaiyan Rock Festival
- Spring Scream
- Taichung Jazz Festival

=== Tibet ===
- List of traditional Tibetan festivals

== Dependencies and other territories ==
=== Christmas Island ===
- Public holidays in Christmas Island

=== Cocos (Keeling) Islands ===
- Culture of the Cocos (Keeling) Islands

=== Hong Kong ===
- Animation-Comic-Game Hong Kong
- Cheung Chau Bun Festival
- Dajiao
- Freespace Fest
- HK International Comedy Festival
- Hong Kong Arts Festival
- Hong Kong Asian Film Festival (film)
- Hong Kong Book Fair
- Hong Kong Food Festival
- Hong Kong International Film Festival (film)
- Hong Kong Lesbian & Gay Film Festival
- Hong Kong People's Fringe Festival
- Hong Kong Pride Parade
- Hong Kong Special Administrative Region Establishment Day
- ifva: Incubator for Film and Visual media in Asia
- Lantern Festival
- Le French May
- Liberatum
- Lunar New Year Fair
- Lunar New Year Fireworks Display in Hong Kong
- Microwave International New Media Arts Festival
- Pok Fu Lam Fire Dragon Dance

==== Music festivals in Hong Kong ====
- 1:99 Concert
- Artistes 311 Love Beyond Borders
- Artistes 414 Fund Raising Campaign
- Artistes 512 Fund Raising Campaign
- Artistes 88 Fund Raising Campaign
- Clockenflap
- Harbour Fest
- Hong Kong Green Jazz Festival
- Hongkong Schools Music Festival
- Rockit Hong Kong Music Festival

=== Macau ===
- List of festivals in Macau

== See also ==
- List of festivals
- List of film festivals
- List of music festivals
