= List of festivals in China =

The following is an incomplete list of festivals in China, of all types.

== Festivals in China ==
- Cold Food Festival
- Dongzhi Festival
- Duanwu Festival
- Freespace Fest
- Fu Yang Festival
- Harbin International Ice and Snow Sculpture Festival
- Hong Kong Arts Festival
- Lantern Festival
- Litang Horse Festival
- Longtaitou Festival
- Lunar New Year Fair
- Lychee and Dog Meat Festival
- Miao Flower Mountain Festival
- Mid-Autumn Festival
- Monkey King Festival
- Nadun
- Nian Li
- Nine Emperor Gods Festival
- Qingdao International Beer Festival
- Qingming Festival
- Qinhuai Lantern Fair
- Qintong Boat Festival
- Renri
- Third Month Fair
- Torch Festival
- Uyghur Doppa Cultural Festival
- Water-Sprinkling Festival
- Weifang International Kite Festival

=== Film festivals in China ===
- List of film festivals in China

=== Music festivals in China ===
- Beijing Jazz Festival
- Beijing Music Festival
- Beijing Pop Festival
- Clockenflap
- Great Wall International Music Academy
- Hong Kong Green Jazz Festival
- Hush!! Full Band Festival
- Intro Music Festival
- Live Earth concert, Shanghai
- Midi Music Festival
- Modern Sky Festival
- The SPSV Music Festival & Academy
- Yue Festival

== See also ==
- List of festivals in Asia#China
