= Festivals in Sri Lanka =

Festival

Sri Lanka, having a history as long as many ancient civilizations, positioned at the crossroads of the East and the West, and being a multicultural society, celebrates a wide variety of festivals, ceremonies and events.

Every year on or about April 13 Sinhalese and Tamil people celebrate Sinhalese and Tamil New Year Festival, Muslims celebrate Mawlid, fast during the Islamic month Ramadan and celebrate at the end of the month with the festival which is (Eid al-Fitr) and (Eid al-Adha) is celebrated on the final month of the Islamic calendar known as Dhu al-Hijjah. Christians celebrate Easter and Christmas. Esala Perahera (A-suh-luh peh-ruh-ha-ruh) is a grand festival in the month of Esala held in Sri Lanka. Happening in July or August in Kandy, it has become a unique symbol of Sri Lanka. It is a Buddhist festival consisting of dances and richly decorated elephants. There are fire-dances, whip-dances, Kandyan dances and various other cultural dances. The elephants are usually adorned with lavish garments. The festival ends with the traditional 'diya-kepeema'. The elephant is paraded around the city carrying a casket venerated by Buddhists as bearing the Relic of the tooth of the Buddha.

== Festivals and events by Gregorian calendar dates ==
(This order may differ from year to year due astrological and astronomical reasons)

=== January ===
- January - Duruthu Full Moon Poya - (Religious/Buddhist)
- January - The Initial Aluth Sahal Mangallaya (New Rice Festival) at the Temple of the Tooth; - (Customary/Sinhalese/Agriculture related)
- January - Patti Pongal - (Religious/Hindu/Agriculture related)
- January - Patti Kiri Ithirima - (Customary/Sinhalese/Agriculture related)

=== February ===
- February - The National Day (Independence Day) - (Customary/Political/Commemorating the Political Freedom attained from the British Empire)
- February - Navam Full Moon Poya - (Religious/Buddhist)

=== March ===
- March - Maha Shivaratri - (Religious/Hindu)
- March - Mawlid - (Religious/Islam)
- March - Medin Full Moon Poya - (Religious/Buddhist)

=== April ===
- April - Day Prior to Sinhalese and Tamil New Year - (Religious/Customary/Buddhist/Hindu/Sinhalese/Agriculture related/Astrology related)
- April - Sinhalese and Tamil New Year - (Religious/Customary/Buddhist/Hindu/Sinhalese/Agriculture related/Astrology related)
- April - National herbal oil ceremony - (Customary/Buddhist/Sinhalese/Astrology related)
- April - Bak Full Moon Poya - (Religious/Buddhist)
- April - Good Friday - (Religious/Catholic/Christian)
- April - Easter - (Religious/Catholic/Christian)

=== May ===
- May - May Day - (Customary/Political)
- May - Watching the new moon for the new Solar year - (Customary/Astrology related)
- May - Vesak Full Moon Poya (Vesak) - (Religious/Buddhist)

=== June ===
- June - Poson Full Moon Poya - (Religious/Buddhist)
- June - Ramadan (Eid al-Fitr) (Religious/Muslim)

=== July ===
- July - Esala Full Moon Poya - (Religious/Buddhist)

=== August ===
- August - Nikini Full Moon Poya - (Religious/Buddhist)
- August - Esala Perahera - (Customary/Religious/Political/Buddhist/Hindu/Sinhalese)

=== September ===
- September - Binara Full Moon Poya - (Religious/Buddhist)

=== October ===
- October - Vap Full Moon Poya - (Religious/Buddhist)
- October - Diwali - (Religious/Hindu)

=== November ===
- November - Il Full Moon Poya - (Religious/Buddhist)
- Hajj (Eid al-Adha) - (Religious/Islam)

=== December ===
- December - Unduvap Full Moon Poya - (Religious/Buddhist)
- December - Christmas - (Religious/Catholic/Christian)
