= Joseph Woods (poet) =

Irish poet

- Born: 1966 (age 59–60)
- Writing career
- Genre: Poetry

Joseph Woods is an Irish poet born in Drogheda, Ireland. He moved with his family to Harare, Zimbabwe in 2016, where he works as a poet, writer and editor.

== Life ==
Born in Drogheda in 1966, he studied biology and chemistry and worked for periods as an industrial chemist, teacher and school principal. He was awarded an MA in poetry (Lancaster University) under the direction of James Simmons. He lived and worked in Kyoto, Japan in the early 1990s and travelled for long periods in Asia, in particular China and India and later in Latin America.

He was a director of Poetry Ireland, the national organisation for the support and promotion of poets and poetry from 2001 to 2013. Moving with his family to Yangon, Myanmar in the summer of 2013, they lived there until post-democratic elections at the end of 2015. In January 2016, his family moved to Harare, Zimbabwe. They continue to live in Zimbabwe.

Woods has published four collections of poetry and for his first, Sailing to Hokkaido (Worple Press, 2001) he won the Patrick Kavanagh Poetry Award. Dedalus Press reissued Woods's first two poetry collections in one volume entitled Cargo (2010) and have published his work since. His third collection Ocean Letters (2011) was translated into Hungarian by Tomas Kabdebó and awarded the Irodalmi Jelen Prize in 2013. Based in part on his experiences of living in Burma, Dedalus Press published his work, Monsoon Diary, in 2018.

He has edited several poetry publications, he co-edited with Irene de Angelis Our Shared Japan (Dedalus Press, 2007) an anthology of contemporary Irish poetry concerning Japan with an accompanying essay by Seamus Heaney. With Gerard Smyth he co-edited The Poetry Project, a web anthology of visual artists and filmmakers interpreting selected poems. He is a consulting editor for the Irish poetry journal Cyphers and has edited anthologies of contemporary Burmese and Zimbabwean poetry for the journal.

In 2014 and in 2019, Woods was a recipient of the Katherine and Patrick Kavanagh Fellowship and in 2016 and 2020 Woods was awarded Arts Council of Ireland Literature Bursaries towards the development of new work.

In Zimbabwe, Woods edited and was a contributing writer for The Mashonaland Irish Association, A Miscellany, 1891-2019; Weaver Press, Harare, 2019. The book traced through the oldest expatriate Irish organisation in Africa, a history of the Irish in Rhodesia and Zimbabwe.

Woods has read at a number of venues and festivals including the Aldeburgh Poetry Festival, Clifden Arts Week, Dublin Writers' Festival, Medellín International Poetry Festival, Marché de la Poésie (Paris), Irrawaddy Literary Festival (Mandalay), Iowa Book Fair, Ubud Writers & Readers Festival, Irish Arts Centre (New York), Marina Tsvetaeva House (Moscow), Nabokov House, St. Petersburg Cúirt International Festival of Literature and Franschhoek Literary Festival (South Africa).

Woods is a contributor and reviewer to numerous newspapers and journals including The Irish Times, The Myanmar Times, Dublin Review of Books, The Mekong Review, and Poetry Ireland Review.

== Poetry books ==
- Sailing to Hokkaido, (Worple Press, Tonbridge, 2001)
- Bearings, (Worple Press, Tonbridge, 2005)
- Cargo, (Dedalus Press, Dublin, 2010)
- Ocean Letters, (Dedalus Press, Dublin, 2011)
- Óceán Levelek, (Irodalmi Jelen Könyvek, Budapest, 2012)
- Monsoon Diary, (Dedalus Press, Dublin, 2018)
- Our Shared Japan, (Eds. Irene de Angelis & Joseph Woods, Afterword by Seamus Heaney), (Dedalus Press, Dublin, 2007)

== Non-fiction ==
- The Mashonaland Irish Association, A Miscellany, 1891-2019, edited by Joseph Woods (Weaver Press, Harare, 2019)
