= Xuzhou cuisine =

Local cuisine in Xuzhou

The local cuisine in Xuzhou is a blend of many of the flavours of northern and southern China, as a result of the location of Xuzhou. It is known for a number of dishes, including various dog meat dishes.

Xuzhou's cuisine tends to be high in fat and salt. Restaurants use a lot of oil and salt in their cooking, including vegetable dishes and soups. Meat is often very fatty, and it tends to be chopped up with the bones still in it. In the history of Jiangsu diet culture, Xuzhou cuisine not only occupies an extremely important position but also is one of the birthplaces of the whole Chinese food culture. It reflected the earliest Chinese cooking theory and witnessed the formation of the Chinese cuisine.

== List of notable dishes ==
English	Traditional Chinese	Simplified Chinese	Pinyin	Notes
Xuzhou-style popiah	烙饃	烙馍	lào mó	A burrito-style roll, in Xuzhou dialect sounds like luǒ mó.
Wok braised chicken	地鍋雞	地锅鸡	dì guō jī	
Strung pork belly	把子肉	把子肉	bǎ zǐ ròu	
Diced meat with vegetables	千刀肉	千刀肉	qiān dāo ròu	
Stuffed fresh fish with square mutton	羊方藏魚	羊方藏鱼	yáng fāng cáng yú	
Stewed dog meat with soft-shelled turtle	黿汁狗肉	鼋汁狗肉	yuán zhī gǒu ròu	The Asian giant softshell turtle, namely "鼋" in Chinese, used to serve as the ingredient, has been replaced by Chinese softshell turtle as the former became endangered in modern era, but the Chinese name of the dish still retains the character "鼋".
Xuzhou-style spicy soup	辣湯	辣汤	là tāng	Different from Henan's, its main ingredients are chicken, pig bone, swamp eel, gluten, pepper, spring onion and ginger.
Sha soup	𮨻湯 (Note: 飠它. The character may not display properly depending on system.)	𬲱汤 (Note: 饣它. The character may not display properly depending on system.)	shá tāng	According to legend, this chicken soup was invented by the legendary Peng Zu in ancient times. In order to make the broth, chicken is stewed for 3 hours with chops before it is removed. The chicken meat is sliced and added to the broth together with hulled wheat, ground star anise, ground chili, onion and ginger juice. Then after two more hours’ brewing, the starchy sauce is added to thicken it with more seasonings including ground pepper, vinegar, sesame oil and the sliced chicken meat.
Soup of assorted ingredients	燒雜拌	烧杂拌	shāo zá bàn	Usually served in local banquets.
Tadpole-like liangfen	瓦魚（~兒）	瓦鱼（~儿）	wǎ yú （~ér）	Made from starch jelly, its name nearly was written as "蛙鱼" nowadays, which is frog in Chinese. It is soft and gelatinous. The broth is a little sour and it is better with spice.

Others include:

- Ground pan is originating from the traditional cooking method of farmers of Xuzhou. By putting chicken, fish and other ingredients into an iron pan and cooking it on an oven with wood. When the water in the pan boils, then sticking the bread on the pan edge. It is similar to braising chicken/ fish in sauce. The taste is salty and spicy.
- Luomo (baked bread) is made by the unfermented flour. With a thickness of about 0.1 cm, it can be rolled into a kind of snack or subsidiary foodstuff. It is better to eat with Sangza, which is a kind of fried food and similar to the crisp noodle.
- Lamb Soup is usually served during the Fu Yang Festival.

== Bibliography ==
- Berry, Chris (November 2003). "Chinese Food Culture Today". Gastronomica. 3 (4): 99–101. doi:10.1525/gfc.2003.3.4.99.
- “From Xuzhou into the South.” TWIF World Indoor Championship 2018
- Hom, Ken (5 May 2015). "Chinese food culture: Influences from within and without". Asia Dialogue.
- Wenlu, RunSheng. "Wa Yu’ Research." 彭城周末--徐州日报社多媒体数字报, 04 Feb. 2012
- Wu, Xinhai. “Xuzhou Cuisine.” JSCchina, 14 Dec. 2011, 10:52
- Ye Jun (19 May 2014). "Xuzhou lightens up on classic cuisine[1]- Chinadaily.com.cn". www.chinadaily.com.cn. China Daily.
