= Ram fighting =

Blood sport utilizing male sheep

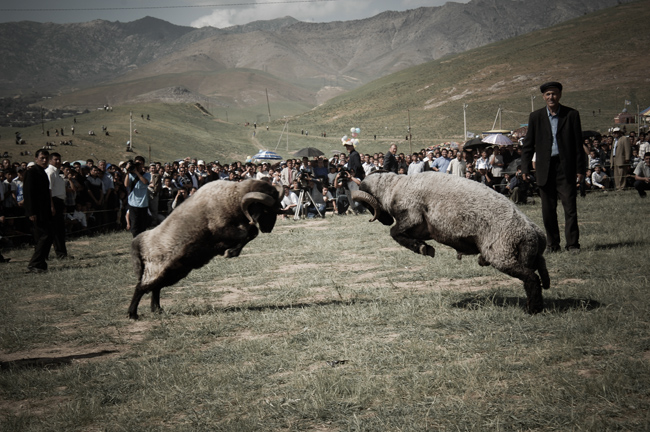
Ram fight in Shahrisabz, Uzbekistan.

Ram fighting is a blood sport between two rams (large-horned male sheep), held in a ring or open field. It is commonly found in sheep or goat husbandry culture in Africa, Asia and Europe. In Nigeria, Uzbekistan and Indonesia, ram fighting gains popularity among locals. Although categorized as a blood sport and an act of animal cruelty, ram fights rarely resulted in the death of the defeated ram, as the loser often is allowed to flee the arena.

== History ==
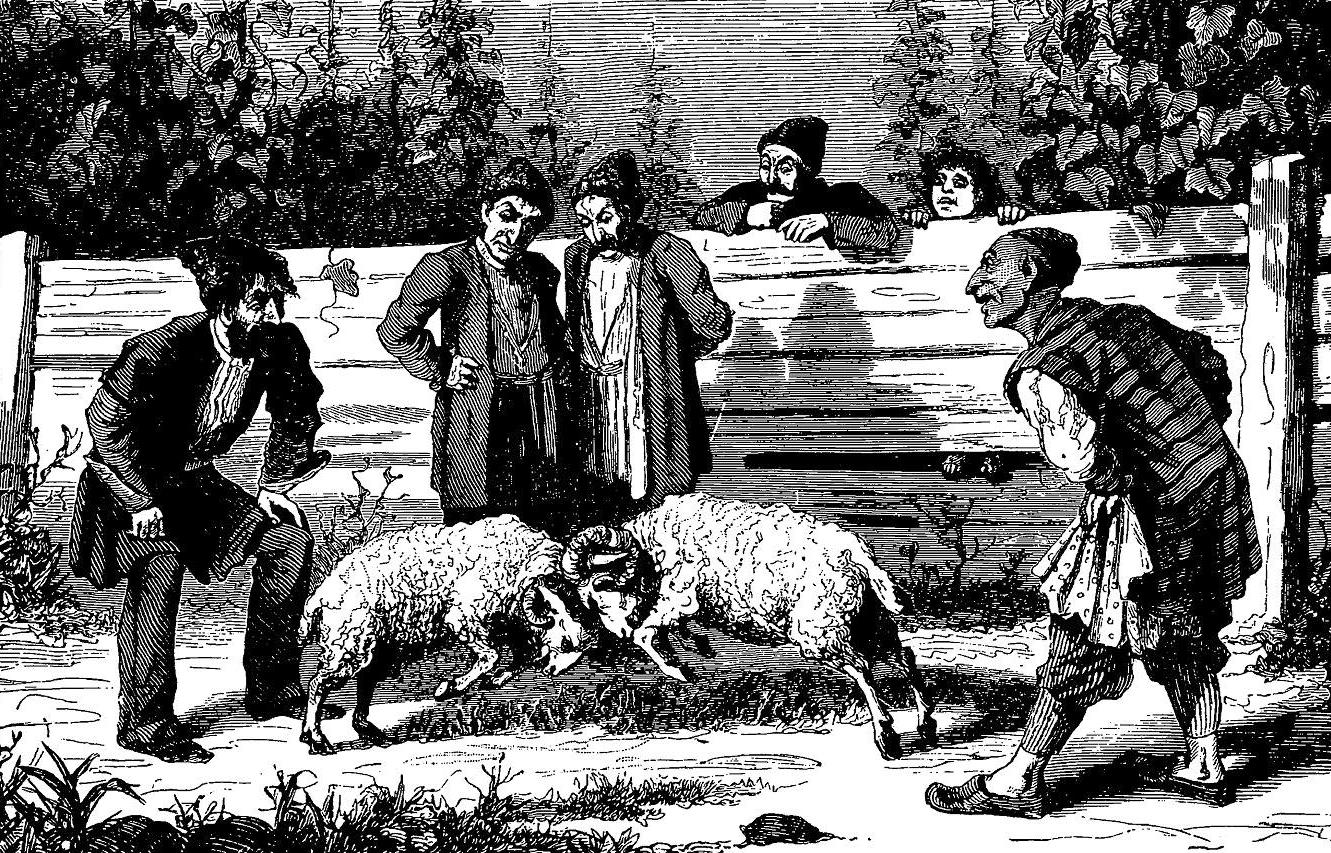
Ram fight in Tbilisi, c. 1884

In the wild, ram fights occurs naturally as a bovine behaviour to settle dominance hierarchy — a contest for alpha male status among virile rams, by ramming their heads into others. Traditionally, the male aggressiveness is not a desirable quality among sheep husbandry, as the sheep farmers prefer a docile sheep and eliminate the aggressive ones through series of selective breedings. This is the main practice of sheep domestication over time. However, farmers and shepherds traditionally may take ram fighting as an occasional pastime or entertainment, and look for this behaviour as the sign of virility, health, and also good gene and immune system.

In some cultures it has been developed into a "game" or a sport, or even held as "national pastime" which sometimes involves betting. Today in some countries, there are efforts to bring the fighting into mainstream by regulating the rules, ensure the fairness and the welfare of the fighting rams. In Uzbekistan, ram fighting is held as part of Asrlar Sadosi. In West Java, Indonesia, ram fighting is held as popular entertainment and ritual. It is associated with the town of Garut, near Bandung. In Nigeria, owners of the participating rams have made large investments to specially train their rams since their youth solely for competitions only, in which there are grand prizes, such as automotive vehicles, for the winners of these fights.

== See also ==
- Cockfighting
- Dog fighting
- Betta fighting
