= Dubai Music Week =

Indian music convention

- Dubai Music Festival Logo
- Genre: Mixed
- Dates: mid-September
- Locations: Dubai, United Arab Emirates
- Years active: 2013 – present
- Founders: Global Gumbo Group, Dubai World Trade Centre
- Website: www.dubaimusicweek.com

The Dubai Music Week is a five-day music convention held at the Dubai International Convention Centre in Dubai during mid-September. The convention features a variety of concerts, conferences, and exhibitions. The event was established in 2013 by the Global Gumbo Group (G3) in partnership with the Dubai World Trade Centre (DWTC). The Dubai Music Festival features top international music artists and entertainment companies.

== 2013 Dubai Music Week ==
The inaugural Dubai Music Week 2013 was presented in association with Dubai Calendar, official Partner Emirates and official sponsor Pepsi. It was the first industry trade show in MENA that brought together major music labels, artists and merchants to exhibit their products and launch initiatives to key industry stakeholders and consumers. Jumeirah Zabeel Saray was the official hotel partner.

Some of the activities included the Pepsi Band Slam, The Music Exhibition, Quincy Jones Seminars, Live Concerts, and Midem Music Conference and Workshops. Pepsi Band Slam, a jamming session included the region's most popular bands competing against each other. Bands from Jordan, Kuwait, Saudi Arabia, Qatar and United Arab Emirates represented diversity in local musical talents. Some of the local bands included Nikotin, Run Junction, Adonis, Empty Chair, J-Fam, and Reset String.

The event was attended by musicians, producers, managers, journalists, labels, app developers and content creators from around the globe. The Michael Jackson Dream Team Seminar hosted Quincy Jones, Rod Temperton, and Bruce Swedien, with music journalist Ben Fong-Torres moderating. The Producers Panel, also MC'd by Fong-Torres, included Quincy Jones, Timbaland, and Will.i.am, who discussed the subject of music production and judged a talent selection competition, the winner receiving a recording and production contract. Five artists were invited to take part in this exclusive showcase: Jay Wud, Hamdan Abri, DD Foxx, Xriss Jor, and Nile. 2013 Concerts

- Will.I.am & Timbaland Live DJ Performance
- Selena Gomez, Stars Dance Tour
- Farhan Live and Pritam Bollywood Night
- All Stars Pepsi Arabic Concert, X–Factor and Arab Idol stars

== See also ==
- Dubai Desert Rock Festival
- Coma Dance Festival
