= The Miao Flower Mountain Festival =

Traditional occasion of the Miao, a Chinese ethnic group

The Miao Flower Mountain Festival (Chinese: 苗族花山节), also known as the Treading on Flower Festival, is a traditional occasion for the Miao, a Chinese ethnic group. It represents a chance for the youth to express love and a chance for middle-aged and older people to bless each other.

== Dates ==
The date of the festival varies, as the Miao live in different parts of the province. In the south of Yunnan province the festival occurs during the first month of the lunar year and in the north eastern / central province the fifth day of the fifth month during the lunar year.

== Festivities ==
Festivities begin with a toast to the participants, followed by the beating of gongs and drums mixed with firecrackers and gunshots. People sing and dance to reed-pipe music and enjoy themselves throughout the night.

== History ==
A legend states ancestors of the ancient Miao fled after defeat in battle with a foreign land and fell into a deep sadness. One year later their ancestors' apparition advised them not to despair, advising them to go to the mountain and sing and dance. Then a flower fell from the sky and landed on a tree. The Miao sang and danced around the tree, and that year the crops grew well. The Miao attributed the successful growth of their crops to the ritual, and continued to practice it. Since then, every participant puts on their best attire and heads into the mountains to plant a flower. In celebration, they hold events such as bullfighting, lion dances and pole-climbing. The pole-climbing event is especially important to the Miao, and whoever wins is awarded a pig's head and good wine.

In 2014, the festival was approved by the state council and listed in the fourth batch of national intangible cultural heritage as a kind of folk custom.

== See also ==
- List of festivals in China
