= Seoul International Fireworks Festival =

Annual festival in South Korea

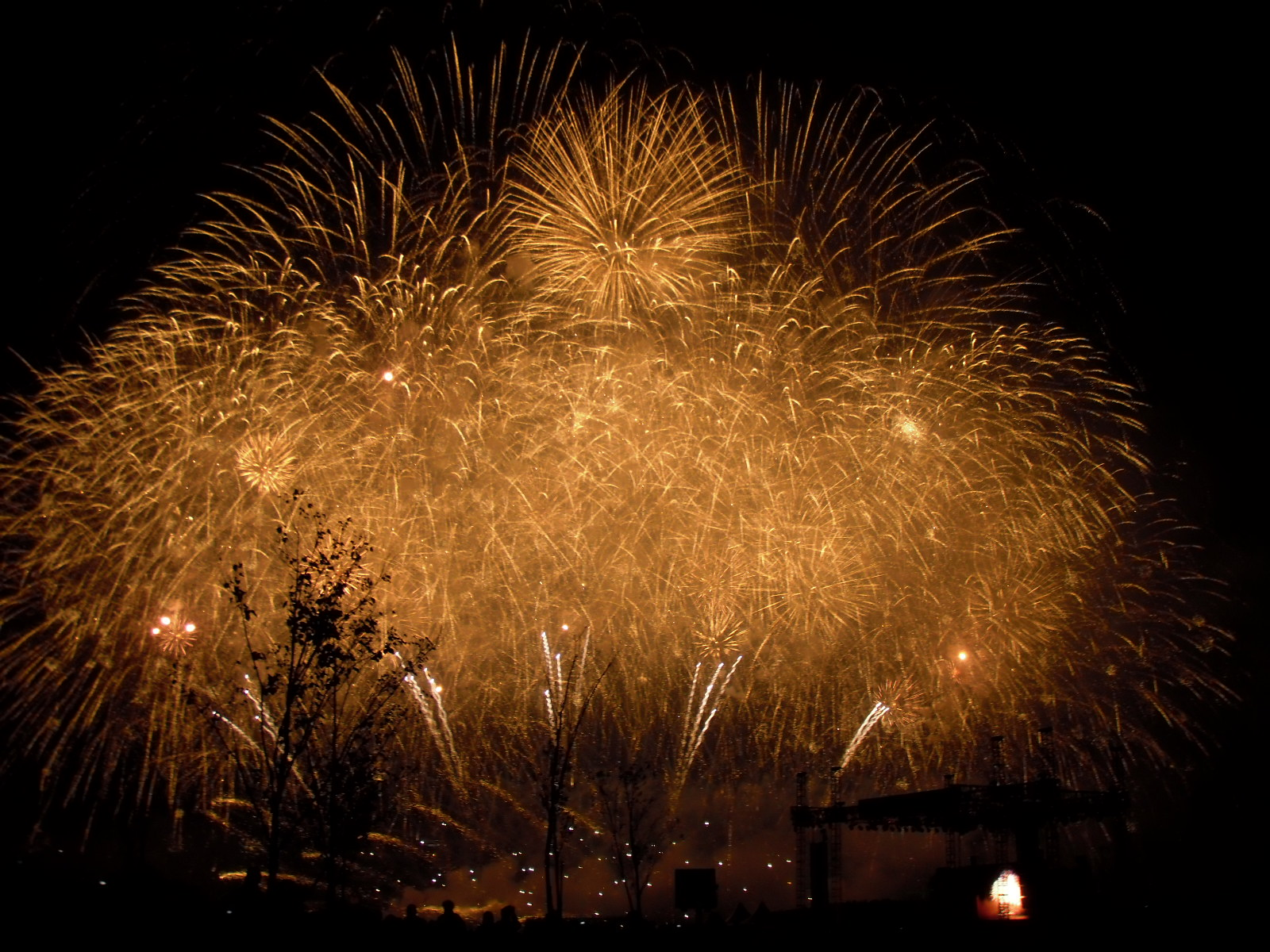
Seoul international fireworks festival 2011

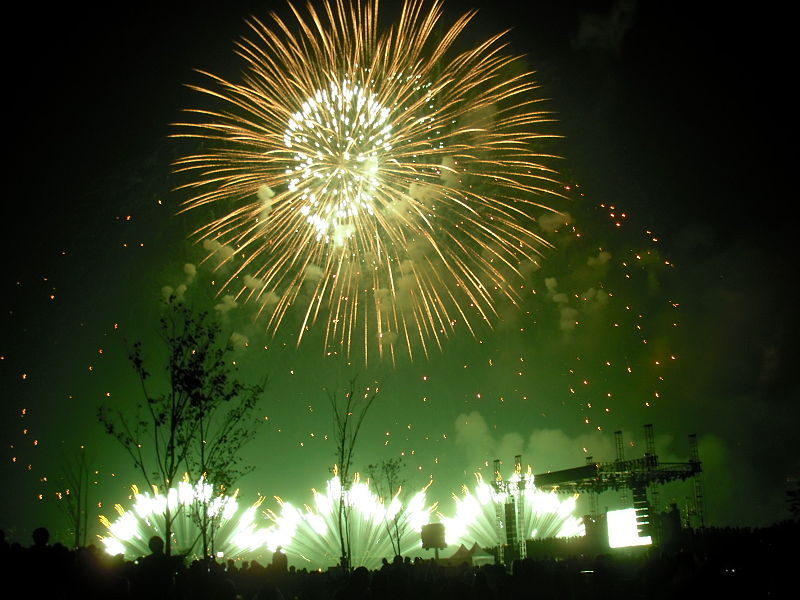
Seoul international fireworks festival 2011

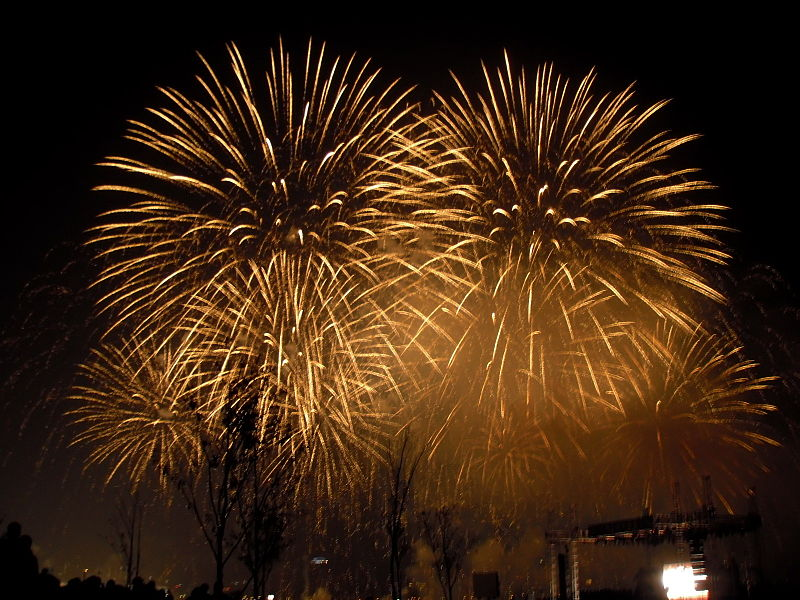
Seoul international fireworks festival 2011

Seoul International Fireworks Festival (Korean: 서울세계불꽃축제) is an annual fireworks event held in Seoul and organized by the Hanwha Group. Different countries participate in this event every year. In 2013, Canada, Japan, France and South Korea worked together.The festival was first held in 2000. The festival is generally held at Yeouido Hangang Park in September or October. However, the festival was cancelled in 2001, 2006, 2009, 2020, and 2021.

Teams from many countries perform different styles of fireworks at the festival. After the festival, it holds a commemorative photo exhibition in the observatory of the 63 building featuring photos from a fireworks photo contest.

== Introduction ==
About 100,000 fireworks went off, and more than a million of viewers visited every year. Seoul International Fireworks Festival is the typical festival in Korea. There are about 20,000 visitors at main event hall at Yeoido. Moreover, there are about 100,000 visitors near Wonhyo Bridge, Hangang Bridge, Hangang Park Ichon Area and more places. In total, about 120,000 visitors enjoyed the festival.

Generally, each team who participated in Seoul international fireworks festival costs about 200 million won. Including the incidental expense, group Hanhwa spent about more than 1.5 billion won.

== Attraction ==
The main event hall that is located in front of the 63 Building, though crowded, is said to be the best place for enjoying the festival. Besides, Hangang Park Ichon Area which is located northern extremity end of Hangang and Nodeul Island which is located at the central Hangang Bridge are chosen for great view. For the 2026 festival, visitors at distant viewing locations could listen to the fireworks soundtrack through the official Orange Play app. It is recommended only for taking pictures or avoiding extremely crowded. If you want to avoid crowded or you are with lovers or family, you can get the official tickets from the fireworks event which is proceeding from Hanwha.

== Location ==
The closest subway station is line 5 Yeouinaru Station. However, the station will be extremely crowded. Therefore, visitors recommended for get off at line 5 Yeouido Station, line 9 Saetgang Station, or line 1 Daebang Station and walk. If visitors want to enjoy the Seoul international fireworks festival at Hangang Park Ichon Area, it is better to get off at line 1 Yongsan Station, line 4 Sinyongsan Station, or Ichon Station. Many visitors enjoy the festival at the opposite side of the main event hall, the Hangang Park Ichon Area. The festival will be crowded with people before it start about 3 hours ago, visitors need to go early to choose the best place to sit.

== Criticism ==
Seoul International Fireworks Festival is organized by a private company, Hanwha, although there are many festivals that are held from the public institution like Busan International Fireworks Festival and Pohang International Lights Festival. In 2005, the then mayor of Seoul, Lee Myung-bak, said "It is a really big problem that Seoul City's budget and event progressing are supporting to the event from only a private institution" and he did not attend the opening ceremony of the Seoul International Fireworks Festival which the mayor customarily attends. In 2005, CBS reported that some had called for the festival to be moved or abolished, citing traffic congestion, litter, and its nature as corporate publicity, while readers' reactions were divided.

== See also ==
- Busan International Fireworks Festival - Asia's biggest fireworks festival
- List of festivals in South Korea
- List of festivals in Asia
