= Gwangalli Beach =

Beach in Busan, South Korea

- Beach
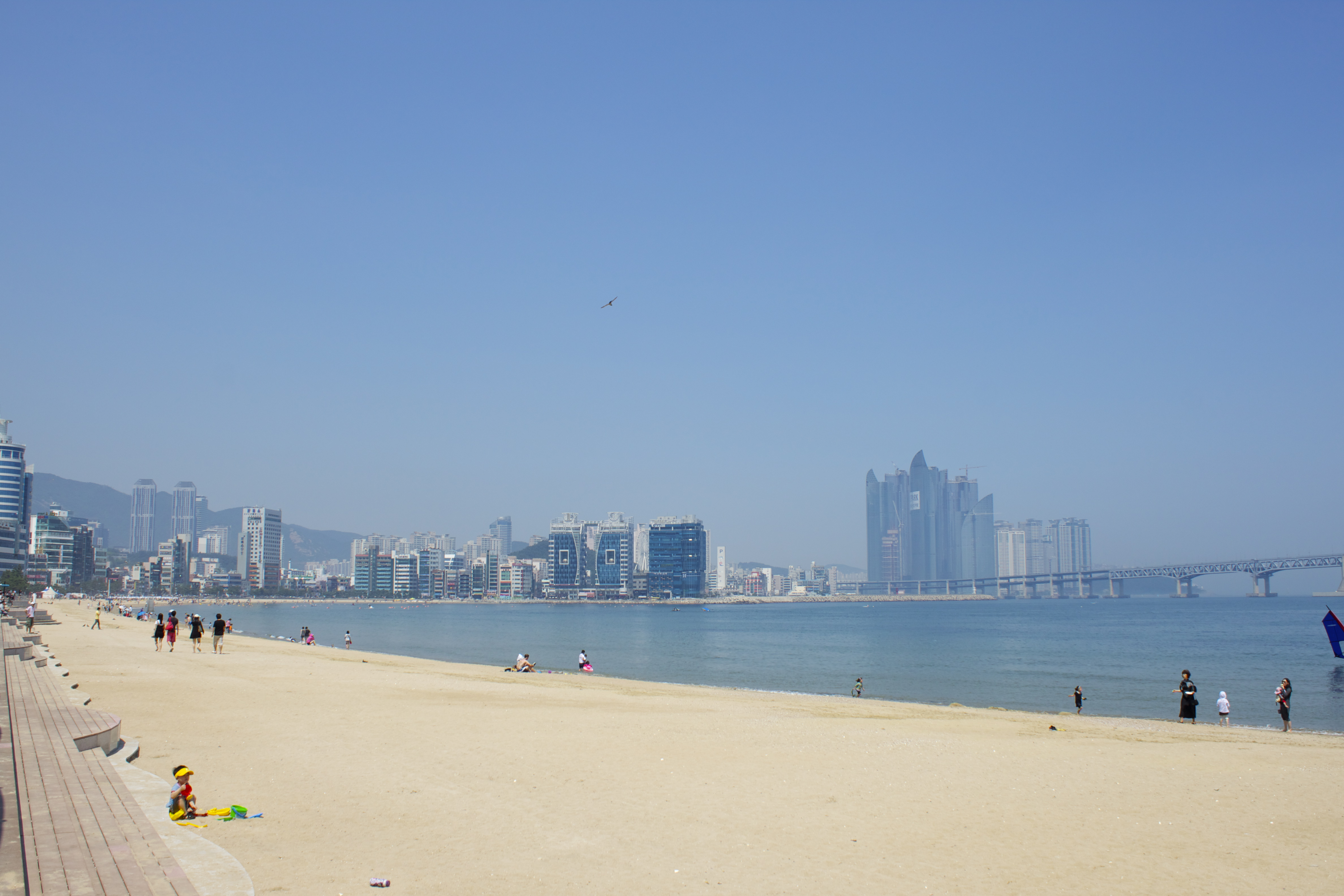
- Gwangalli Beach in 2011
- Interactive map of Gwangalli Beach
- Coordinates: 35°09′15″N 129°07′14″E
- Location: Busan, South Korea
- Water bodies: Sea of Japan

Dimensions
  - Length: 1.4 kilometres (0.87 mi)

Korean name
- Hangul: 광안리 해수욕장
- Hanja: 廣安里 海水浴場
- RR: Gwangalli haesuyokjang
- MR: Kwangalli haesuyokchang

The Gwangalli Beach (Korean: 광안리 해수욕장) or Gwangan Beach is a beach in Gwangan 2(i)-dong, Suyeong District, Busan, South Korea. It is west of Haeundae Beach. It sits inside a cove spanned by the Gwangan Bridge and covers 82,000 square meters over a length of 1.4 km and a width of 25 to 110 metres, in a curved in a half-moon shape with fine sand. Adjacent are alleys with restaurants, coffee shops and nightclubs. Because of its popularity, city officials are pushing for improving water quality around the beaches.

The beach is near the Busan Yachting Center used for the sailing events of the 1988 Summer Olympics.

For the 2018 film Black Panther, a car chase scene which required over 150 cars and 700 people was filmed in the Gwangalli Beach area.

== Events ==
- Busan Marine Sports 2008: with beach volleyball, canoe and boating.
- 2011 K-Pop Super Concert on 28 October 2011: emcee by Ha Ji-won and Kim Hyung Jun of SS501 and broadcast on SBS on 6 November.
- Gwangalli Marvelous Drone Light Show (광안리 M(Marvelous) 드론 라이트쇼)

== Gallery ==
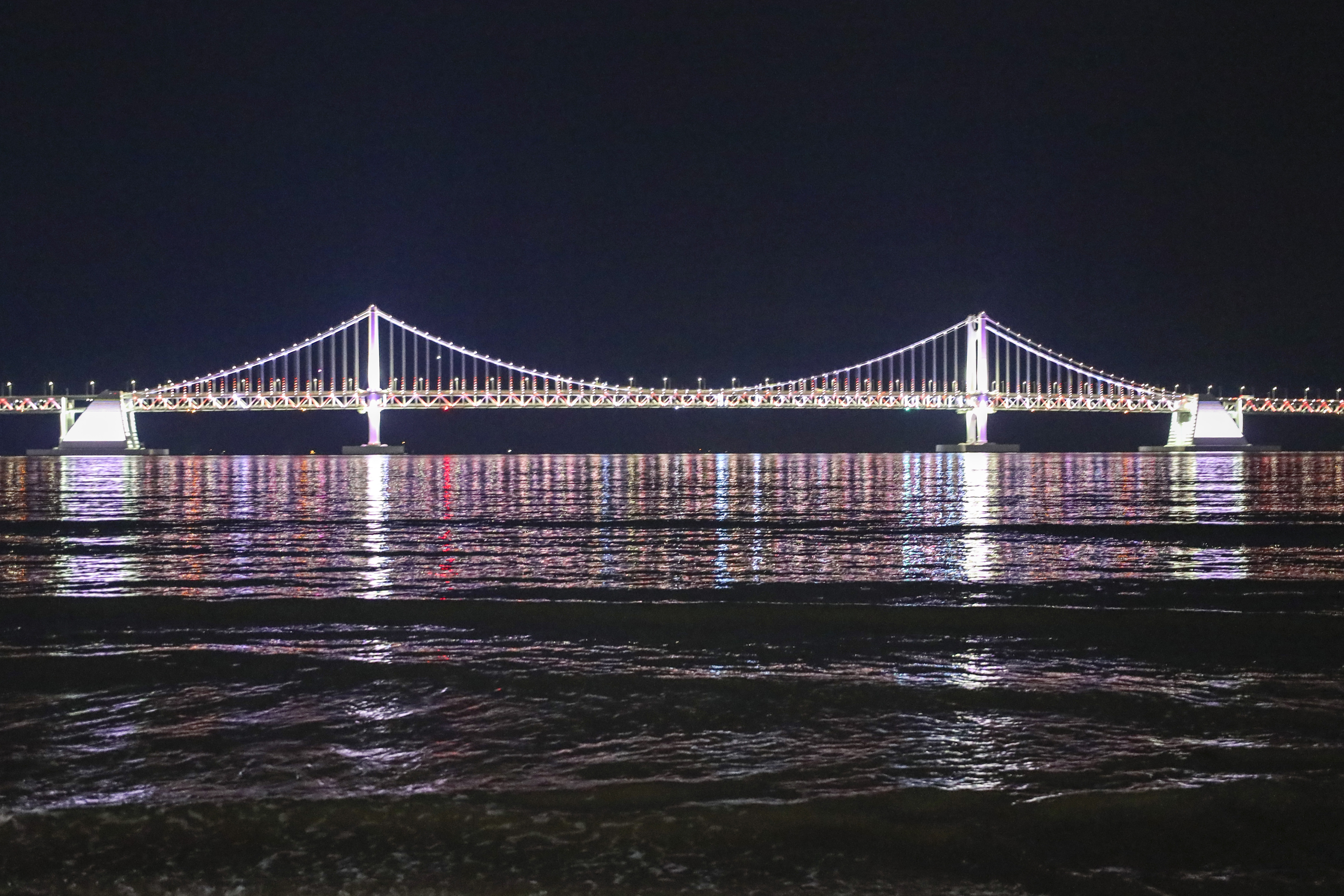
The bridge from the beach, illuminated at night (2018)

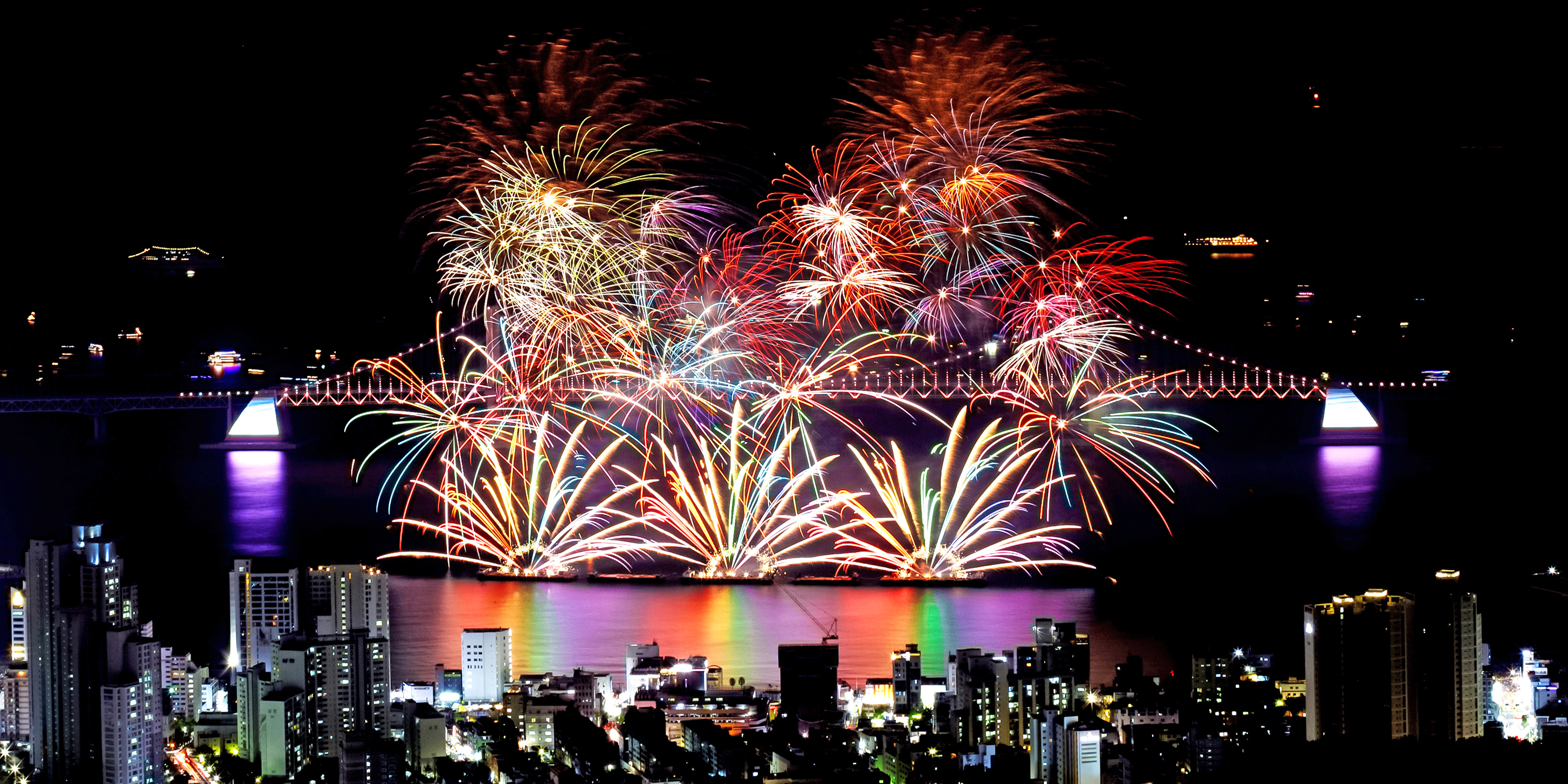
The Busan International Fireworks Festival held annually at the beach (2018)

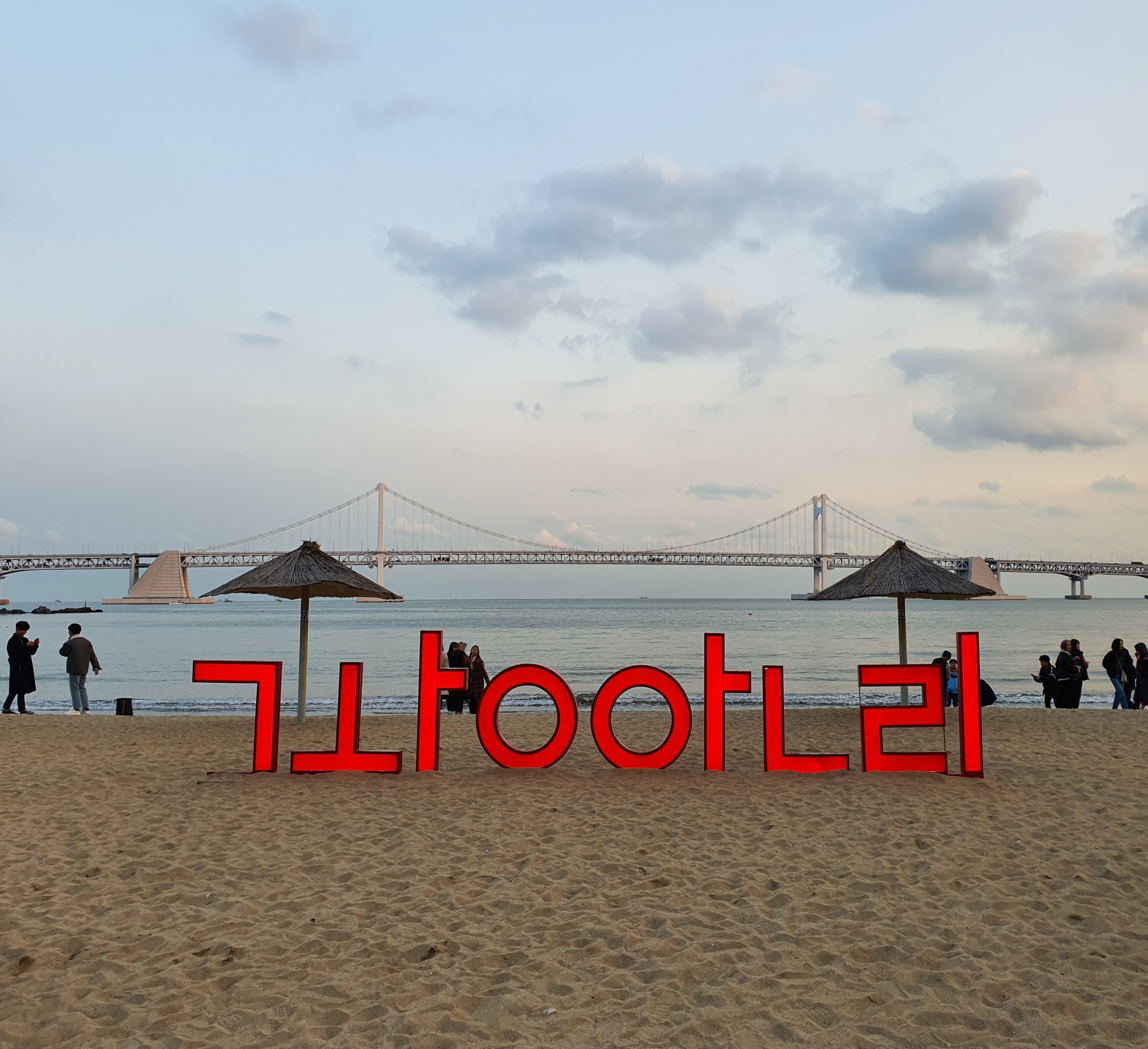
A sculpture of the beach's name and bridge in background (2020)

== See also ==
- Gwangan Bridge
- Haeundae Beach
