= Busan International Fireworks Festival =

Annual festival at Gwangalli Beach

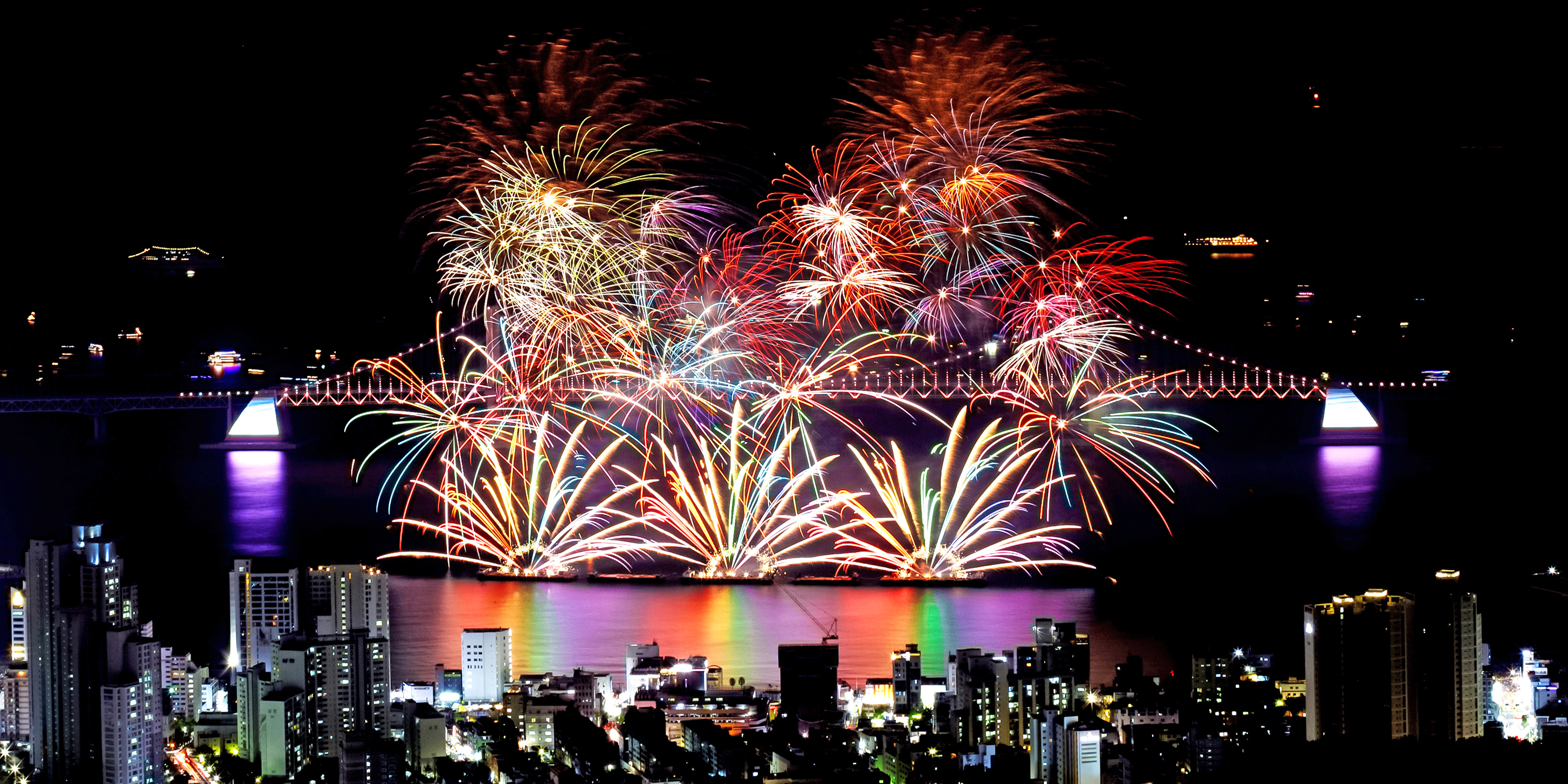
- The festival (2018)
- Locations: Gwangalli Beach, Busan, South Korea
- Founded: 2005; 21 years ago
- Website: https://busanfireworks.com/en/

Busan International Fireworks Festival (Korean: 부산국제불꽃축제) is an annual fireworks festival in Gwangalli Beach, Busan, South Korea. The festival features fireworks, tourist activities, music, and light shows, against the backdrop of the Busan Bay and Gwangan Bridge.

== History ==
The Busan Fireworks Festival begins with a history that began to commemorate the 2005 APEC Busan Summit. In 2010, the festival attracted about 2.52 million visitors from all over the country and abroad. In 2011, the Busan International Fireworks Festival is held from October 21 to October 29, 2011. In 2012, it held from October 26 to October 28 at Busan Asiad Main Stadium, Gwangalli Beach and Gwangan Bridge. But the festival which was scheduled to be held on October 27 was delayed because of heavy rain. In 2013, it held from October 25 to October 26. In 2014, it held from October 24 to October 25. In 2015, it held from October 23 to October 24. It was held with Tsushima at the same time.

There have been concerns expressed about traffic, high prices, waste disposal, and pollution from the fireworks.

== Gallery ==
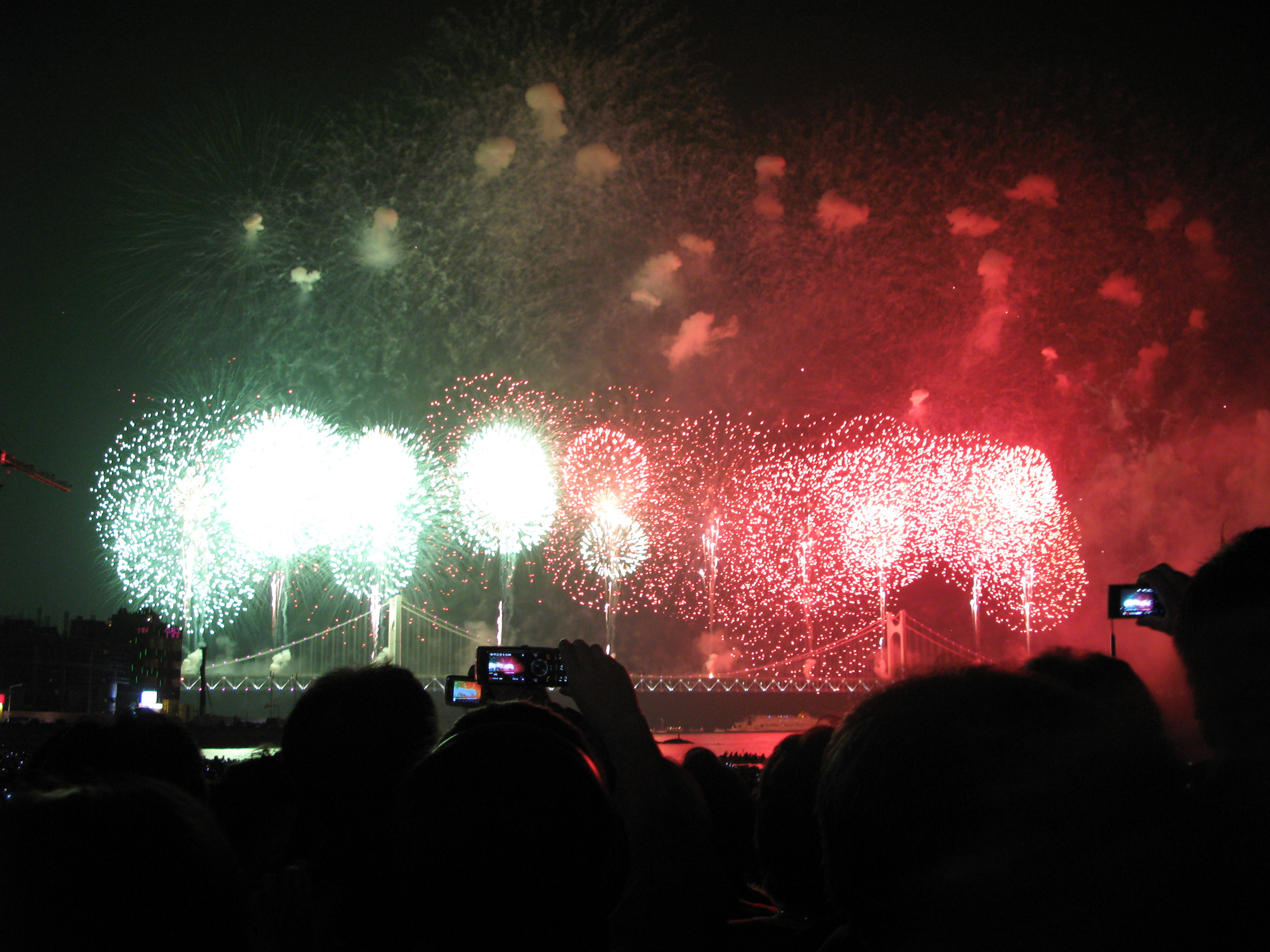
The fourth festival (2008)

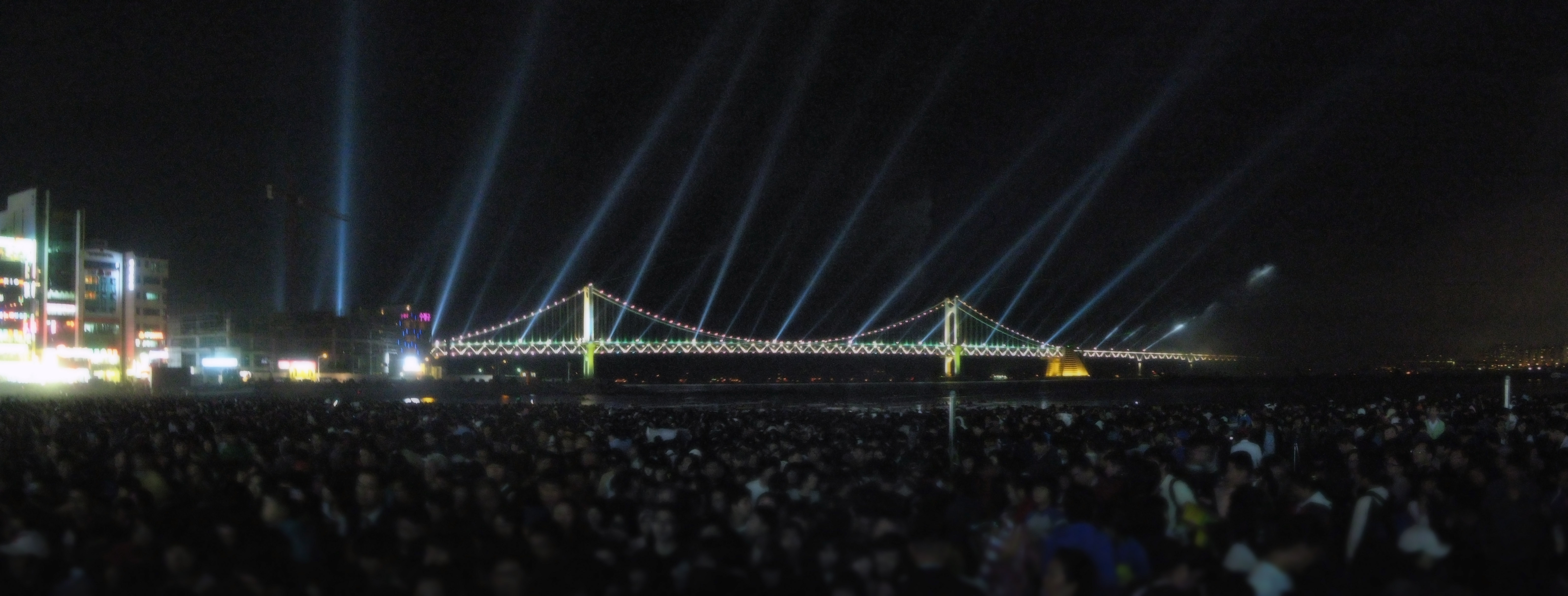
Lights on Gwangan Bridge and crowds (2008)

== See also ==
- Seoul International Fireworks Festival
- Busan International Film Festival (BIFF)
- Busan International Mobility Show (BIMOS)
- List of festivals in South Korea
- List of festivals in Asia
