= Baku International Film Festival East-West =

Film festival

- Location: Baku, Azerbaijan
- Founded: 1991
- Language: Azerbaijani
- Website: https://aki.az/en/film-festival/

The Baku International Film Festival East-West (Azerbaijani: Bakı Beynəlxalq Film Festivalı Şərq-Qərb), is the international film festival in Azerbaijan. It is a non-profit cultural event that takes place every year.

The first edition of the festival was held in 1991 in Baku. The official language of the festival is Azerbaijani.

Traditionally, the festival awards prizes in the following nominations:

- "For the most humane message viewers"
- "For contribution to the world cinematography"
- "For the most womanly image"
- "For the most manly image"
- "For a bright debut"
