= Hua Hin Jazz Festival =

Hua Hin Jazz Festival is a jazz festival in Hua Hin, Thailand. The festival, organized by Hilton since 2001, is usually held in June and features Thailand's best jazz talent.
