= Dubai World Games Expo =

Annual convention in Dubai, UAE

Dubai World Game Expo
- Status: Active
- Genre: Multi-genre
- Venue: Hall 8 of the Dubai International Convention and Exhibition Centre
- Location: Dubai
- Country: United Arab Emirates
- Inaugurated: 2007
- Organizer: Index Conferences and Exhibitions
- Website: www.gameexpo.ae

The Dubai World Game Expo (DWGE) is a multigenre convention held annually in Dubai, United Arab Emirates in the month of November. The DWGE showcases game and app developers, game publishers, game distributors, retailers, and other businesses related to interactive entertainment. The DWGE is the largest event for video games and digital entertainment industry in the Middle East & North African (MENA) region. The Expo predates the more well-known "Comic Con" event which had its first Middle East Film and Comic Con in 2012. The DWGE is held in order to introduce a wide variety of video games, online games, mobile games, edutainment & infotainment software, game related hardware, and next-generation platforms to the public and potential investors. Special events, game competition, presentation, and workshops will also be held during the show.

== 2015 - 2020 ==
The 2015 Dubai World Game Expo will feature 130 different companies from 58 countries. Several countries including Japan, Korea, Malaysia, and Morocco will have their own "pavilions" at the event. Some of the more well-known participants include Al-Futtaim Electronics, Apple Inc., Dubai Police, Equinix MENA, Facebook, Falafel Games Co Ltd., Game Cooks, GameCloud Studios, Gameforce, Gameloft, Gate2Play, Geekay Distribution General Trading LLC, HUAWEI Tech., IBM Middle East FZ LLC, Microsoft, Mobily, Mobogenie, Paybyme, paysafecard, Playzone, Semanoor International, Tahadi Games, TIMWE, TRA – Telecommunications Regulatory Authority, and Ubisoft Abu Dhabi.

Dubai World Game Expo was a 2-day event held from 14 to 15 November 2016 at the Dubai International Convention & Exhibition Centre in Dubai, United Arab Emirates. This event showcased products various software products in the Toys & Games industry.

Dubai World Game Expo is scheduled to place on May 10–11, 2017 in Dubai at the Abu Dhabi National Exhibition Centre. DWGE introduces a variety of games, software, hardware, and next-generation platforms.
