= Yue Festival =

The Yue Festival is a live music festival featuring Chinese and international performers, in Shanghai, China. The first annual Yue Festival took place on October 5, 2007, outdoors in Zhongshan Park. Talents included Faithless, Talib Kweli, Ozomatli, Yacht, Banana Monkey, SuperVC, Hedgehog, IZ, Bananas Soundsystem, Dragontongue, Uprooted, and Redstar.

A mini-Yue Festival took place at the Star Live in Beijing on October 2 and 3, 2007, with Faithless, Talib Kweli, and Ozomatli.

== See also ==
- Midi Modern Music Festival
- Modern Sky Festival
- Chinese rock
- Beijing Jazz Festival
- Beijing Pop Festival
