= Boombamela =

The 2005 Logo

Boombamela (Hebrew: בומבמלה) is a formerly New Age-oriented and more recently mainstream festival held annually on Chol HaMoed Pesach (Intermediate Days of Passover) in Israel since 1999. The inspiration for the festival is the Hindu festival of Kumbh Mela. Its organizers have described it as "a place for meeting, experiencing, crossing borders and transcending social limitations through music, creation, and connection with nature." The festival is located on the remote sandy Nitzanim beach, between Ashdod and Ashkelon.

The festival has risen in popularity and prominence over the years and is now perhaps the most famous of Israel's festivals (challenged only by Tel Aviv's summer Love Parade). The seventh Boombamela, in 2005, attracted 36,000 visitors - the third highest, after 2004's 41,000 and 2003's 37,500. More and more foreigners have taken note of the festival, and a visitor will often hear various other tongues being spoken beside Hebrew.

== Transportation ==
There are organized bus services from all over Israel to Tel Aviv specially, and from there, organized bus rides to Nitzanim Beach.

== Activities ==
Boombamela features many performing bands on several sound stages, during the day as well the night, and dance clubs which operate around the clock. A great variety of music genres can be heard at the festival, including reggae, trance, hip-hop, Indian Ragas, and rock.

The festival grounds, sprawling over hundreds of dunam, are divided into villages (such as the spiritual village, where people may rest in a tent and listen to the teachings of Indian Gurus) and areas (for example, the performance area or the camping area), and there are also restaurants, shops and bathroom and shower facilities. Apart from the publicly stretch of seashore, there is a sequestered nudist beach and a family beach, which are not adjacent. There is, for the purpose of socializing or "suture" many chai shops, with pillows provided.

For those wishing to observe Passover or Shabbat during the event, kosher food is available. Prayer services are held at Ohel Ahava V'Teffila (Tent of Love and Prayer) located in the Neo-Hippy Chassidic Religious Camp and outside of the main ground at the Chabad Tent, respectively.
