= Yadana Cave Festival =

Annual festival held in Amarapura, Myanmar

Yadana Cave Festival (Burmese: ရတနာ့ဂူနတ်ပွဲ) is an annual festival held in Amarapura, Burma (21°54′N 96°03′E) . The festival celebrates celestial beings. The locals typically wear bamboo hats and hold prayer flowers during the festival.
