= Iraq Short Film Festival =

- Location: Baghdad, Iraq
- Language: Arabic, Kurdish
- Website: http://www.cvas-isff.org/index.html

The Iraq Short Film Festival is an Iraqi film festival for short films established in 2005.
