= MetalFront Fest =

Music festival in Yerevan, Armenia

METALFRONT FEST
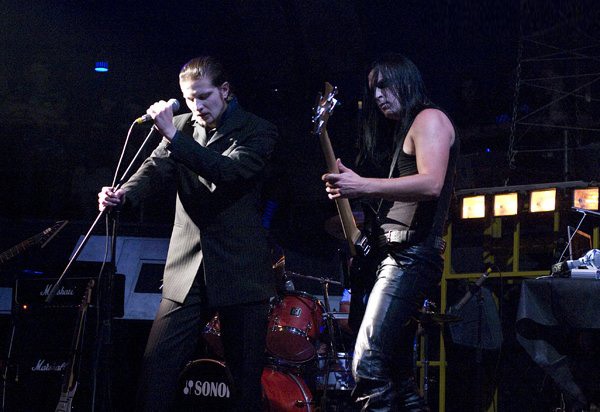
- Genre: Metal
- Dates: November
- Locations: Yerevan, Armenia
- Years active: 2008 - present
- Founders: metalfront.am
- Website: www.metalfront.am

The MetalFront Fest is a two-day event celebrating the different styles of rock and metal music in the world on one stage in Yerevan, Armenia. It is the only festival of its kind in Armenia.

On November 26 and 27, 2008, Melechesh headlined the "MetalFront Fest 2008" in Armenia.

== 2008 ==
November 26:

- Arkona
- Mordab
- Stryfe
- Empyray
- 5grs
- Scream of Silence

November 27:

- Melechesh
- Rossomahaar
- Sworn
- Dogma
- E.V.A
- Vaspooher
- Nairi

== 2009 ==
The 2009 edition was cancelled.

== See also ==
- List of heavy metal festivals
