= Baku International Tourism Film Festival =

- Location: Baku, Azerbaijan
- Founded: 2013
- Festival date: November
- Language: Azerbaijani; English
- Website: www.bitff.az

The Baku International Tourism Film Festival (Azerbaijani: Bakı Beynəlxalq Turizm Filmləri Festivalı), is an international film festival in Azerbaijan. It is a non-profit cultural event that takes place every year. The first edition of the Festival was held on 20–24 November 2013 at the Nizami Cinema Center in Baku. The official languages of the festival are Azerbaijani and English.
