= Asrlar Sadosi Festival of Traditional Culture =

Cultural festival in Uzbekistan

"Asrlar Sadosi" Festival of Traditional Culture
- Asrlar Sadosi Festival
- Location: Tashkent, Uzbekistan
- Founded: 2008
- Website: https://asrlarsadosi.com/en/

"Asrlar Sadosi" (English: "Echo of Centuries") was a festival of traditional Uzbek culture which attracts tens of thousands of local and overseas tourists every year and presents all the diversity of the national traditions and customs, handicrafts and cuisine, unique oral and non-material heritage. Asrlar Sadosi was annually organised by The Fund Forum of Culture and Arts of Uzbekistan since 2008, in association with UNESCO since 2009.

== Overview ==
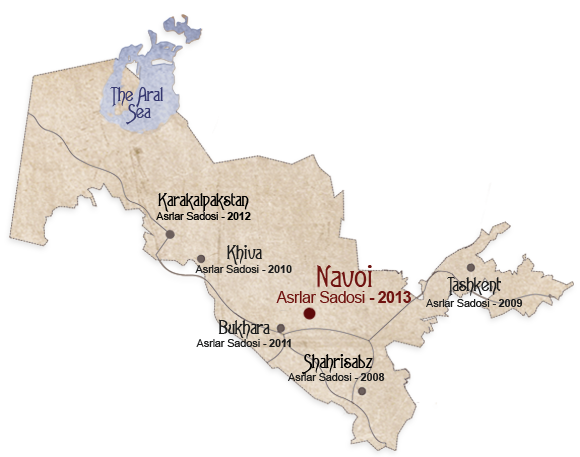
Host Cities of the Asrlar Sadosi Festival

The Asrlar sadosi festival consists of folklore bands competitions, folk tellers (bakhshi), traditional art-concerts, shows and national dress defiles on open-air stages. The Festival also includes folk games, koupkari (Uzbek horse sport), demonstrative fights of kurash wrestlers, cock fights and performances of rope-walkers (darboz's), competition of Uzbek national cuisine among the best chefs (oshpaz) from all over the country. During the Festival an exhibition-fair of applied arts is happening, where the best masters of ceramics, embossing, embroidery, miniature, textile and woodworking, national puppet makers and other artists demonstrate their works and the creation process.

== History ==
Being held annually since 2008, Asrlar Sadosi takes place in different regions of Uzbekistan in historical or cultural centers as an outdoor event. The first festival was held near Shakhrisabz, the next one took place in Akkurgan and Bostanlik districts, Tashkent Region, and was organised in association with UNESCO. In 2010, Khiva was a host city of the festival which was held in the historical architectural complex Ichan-Qala. In 2011 another well known historical city of Uzbekistan, Bukhara, hosted Asrlar Sadosi. In 2012 the festival took place in Tuproq Qala ancient fortress in Ellikqala District of Karakalpakstan.

=== 2008 ===
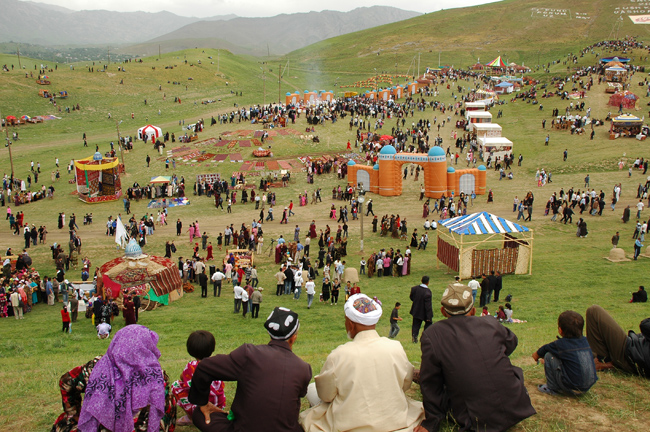
Asrlar Sadosi 2008 in Shahrisabz

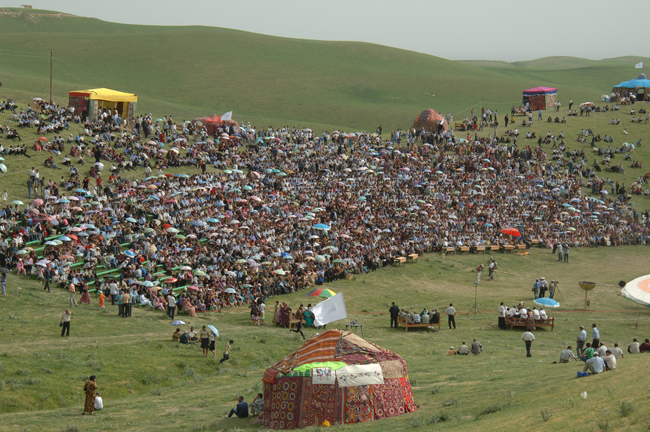
Asrlar Sadosi 2008 in Shahrisabz

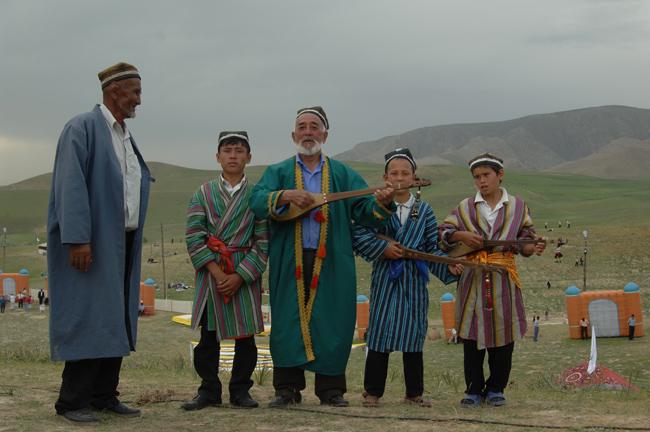
Asrlar Sadosi 2008 in Shahrisabz

The first Asrlar Sadosi Festival of Traditional Culture took place at Kaynar Village of Kitab District near Shahrisabz city, a cultural and historical hub and the birthplace of Amir Timur (Tamerlane), and had 30,000 participants.

"The small township made up of colorful marquees has emerged on six hills in the open air where masters of applied arts, painters, designers, chefs, and other people of culture and arts from all parts of Uzbekistan presented their masterpieces. An exhibition fair of ceramics, coinage, gold-embroidery art, miniature, textile, wood engraving, and national dolls was held as a part of the festival

“We are pleased to have an opportunity to learn more about the Uzbek traditions, culture, art and national cuisine… All the people we have met here are so friendly and hospitable. It is just amazing how local people are interested in this event. It shows how your people value their traditions and try to preserve their centuries-old cultural uniqueness”

— Brafor Lu - The head of the World Bank Representative Office in Tashkent

“I am being joined by my children here,” she said. “I am glad that they are also learning unique culture of Uzbekistan. I would like to especially note that the venue of the festival is just perfect. On the way here we have seen such beautiful landscapes and hills that amazed us. Also I am delighted that this festival has presented various directions of Uzbek culture, art and traditions. Usually, festivals cover only one direction or sphere, for instance, music festival, festival of applied art. But here in Kaynar we have seen the Uzbek culture, art, traditions, cuisine and national costumes in all their beauty. I commend organizers for their efforts”

— Anna Paolini. The head of UNESCO`s Representative Office in Uzbekistan

=== 2009 ===
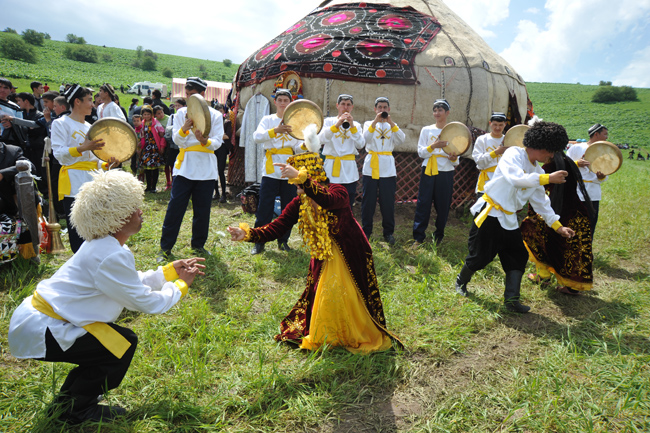
Performances by folk groups. Tashkent region

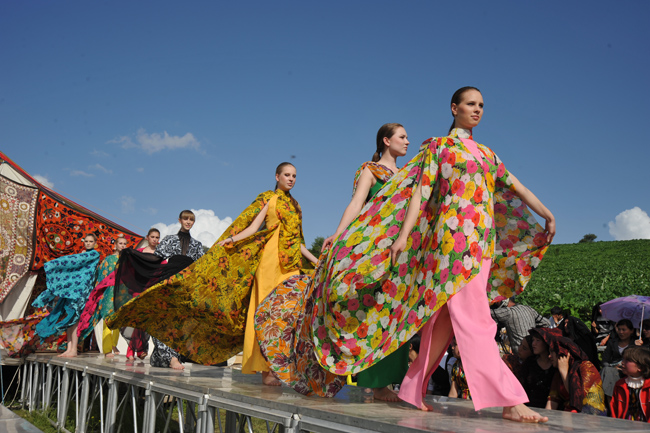
National Dress Festival. Tashkent region

This year the Asrlar Sadosi Festival coincided with the 2200th anniversary of Tashkent and took place in Akkurgan and Bostanlik Districts of Tashkent Region. UNESCO has been collaborating with the Fund Forum in organising the Festival since this year. More than 15,000 people participated in the Festival in 2009.

Besides the folk part, the program offered scientific events. On the first day of Asrlar Sadosi Festival the Youth Art Palace in Tashkent hosted a scientific conference dedicated to the presentation of a new book «Civilization, States and Cultures of Central Asia» by academician Edvard Rtveladze of the Academy of Sciences of the Republic of Uzbekistan.

“Everything is marvellous! I think I need to come back to Uzbekistan and visit old cities Samarkand, Bukhara and Khiva. Because I need to learn more about Uzbekistan, it rich culture and history”

— Benoit Toulin Vice – President of Chaumet jewelry house

=== 2010 ===
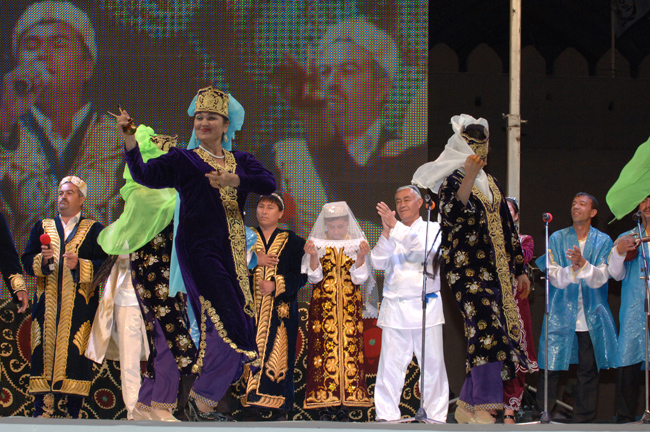
The Festival gala concert, Khiva

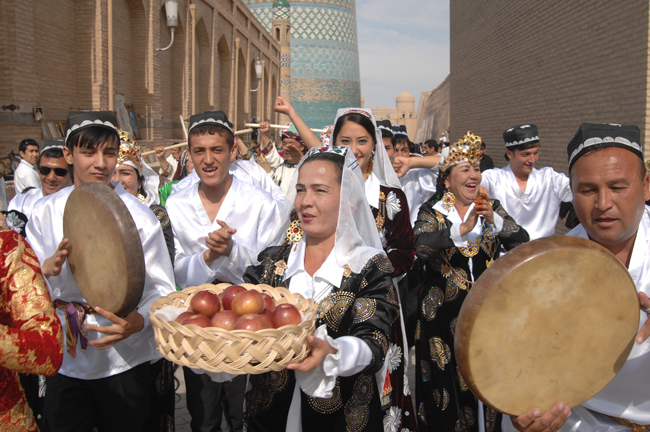
Performances by folk groups, Khiva

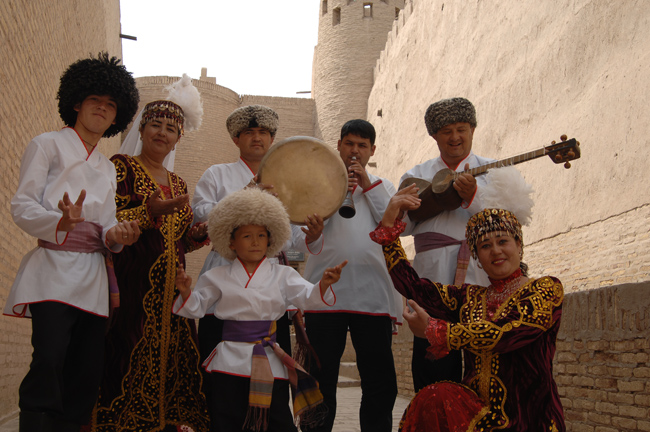
Performances by folk groups, Khiva

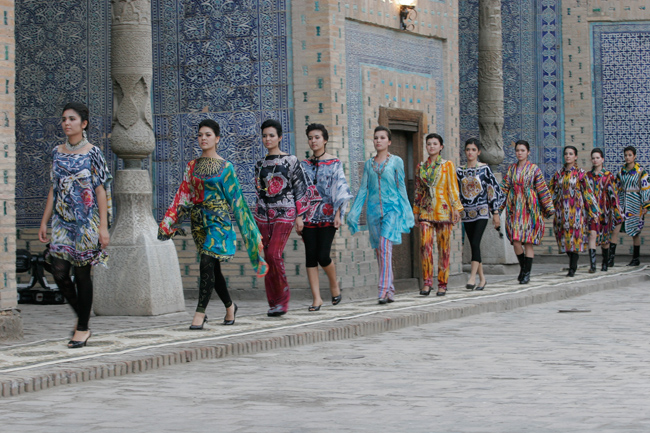
National Dress Festival, Khiva

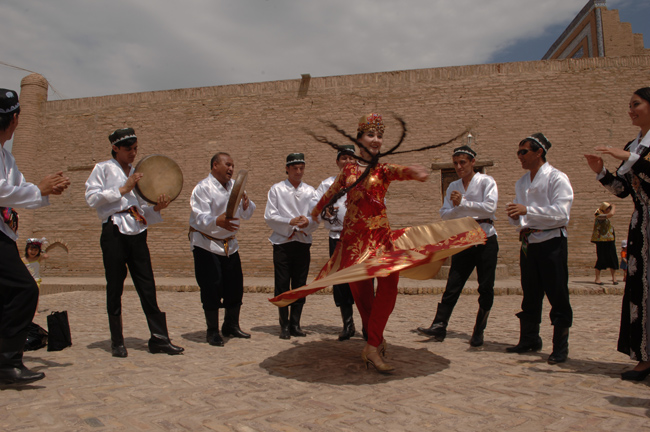
Performances by folk groups, Khiva

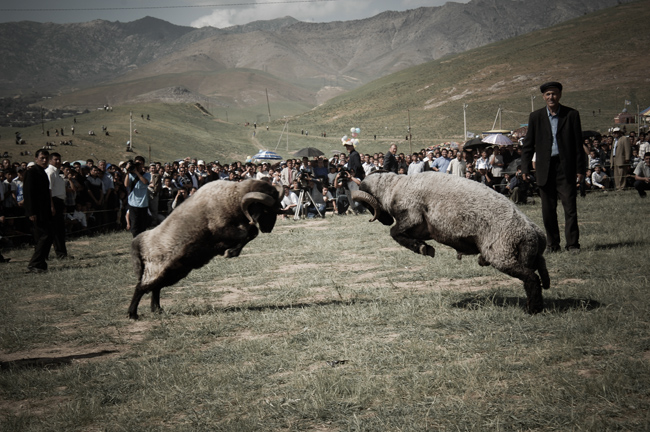
National Games, Shahrisabz

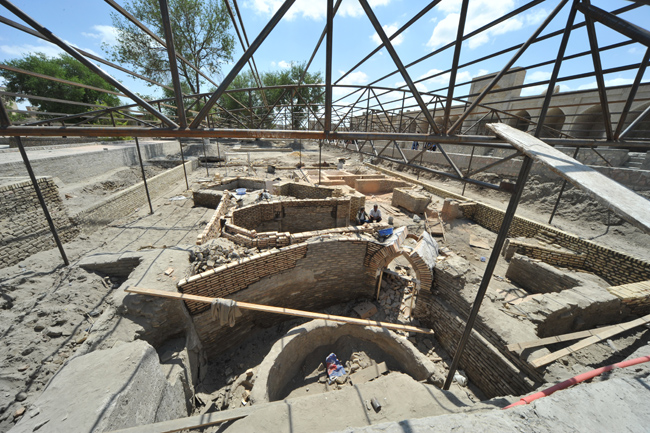
Archeological excavations, Bukhara 2011

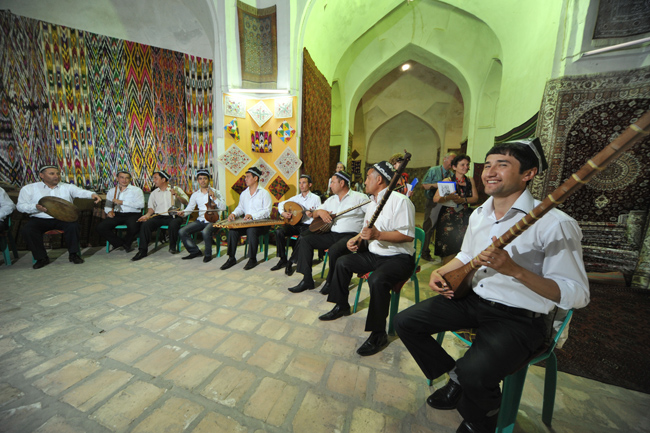
Performances by folk groups, Bukhara 2011

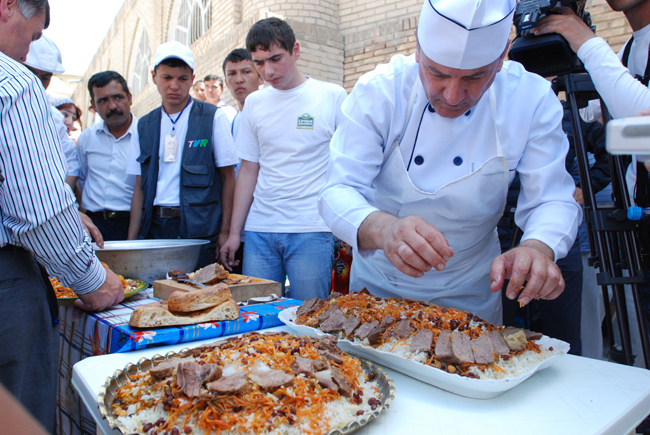
National Cuisine Festival, Bukhara 2011

The historic city of Khiva played host to the third “Asrlar Sadosi” which took place in a World Heritage Site, Ichan-Qala, a walled town inside the Khiva. This year, visitors interested in archaeology and history had a chance to attend a series of educational workshops, including master classed and presentations of new research projects. In 2010 the Festival had around 20,000 participants.

“- I had a very good time during this Festival. It's good to see the young generation remember and honor our past. The pilaf event which was organized for all the war veterans gave us an opportunity to meet with our war fellows and reminisce about the past. This sort of understanding is very important for us.”

— Bekchan Jumaniyazov - a 100-year-old veteran, pensioner

“Hearing the music and seeing all the colors of the Festival is really great. Very nice to have such kind of Festival in such a special place like Khiva. It is a great idea that every year the Festival is held in different places. It gives people an opportunity to discover a new city.”

— Diane Polet - UNICEF Representative Office in Belgium

I am here to learn more about Uzbekistan`s artifacts, to make new contacts for further exchange and joint projects with our museum. This is my first visit not only to Uzbekistan but also to Asia!... The first thing that struck me upon arrival in Khiva is that Ichan-Qala architectural complex looks intact. I was also amazed by churches and madrasahs. It is very important to organize festivals like Asrlar Sadosi. So many people can come and it's an excellent opportunity to meet new people, establish ties and build a foundation for fruitful collaborative projects.

— Madeleine Leclair - Branly Museum (Paris)

“It is a wonderful experience to be here and join this wonderful festival. You see the authentic rich culture of Uzbekistan. We are most appreciative of the Fund Forum for organizing this event in Khiva…”

— Hilel Newman - Ambassador of Israel to Uzbekistan

“- This is my first time in Khiva. I`ve read a lot about it, but actually seeing it is incredible. I was lucky to see Samarkand, Bukhara and now I am here. So I can say that I saw 3 very fabulous cities. And comparing them, I can say that they all are equally fascinating in different ways. It is very nice to be here, to have relaxing days, to see activities of craftsmen, have a nice pilaf for lunch, to enjoy kurash wrestling… When you are going through the streets you can see people dancing, singing, lots of different aspects of culture. I think the activities of Fund Forum are very important. It's very important to work with young people, who are the future of the country. The Fund Forum keeps the future with the young and also the heritage of the past together. I think it's very important. And the British Council wants to promote Uzbekistan in the UK and the Fund Forum is a great partner for us to be able to do that”

— Steve McNulty - Director, British Council in Uzbekistan

It has been great fun for me to be here as a part of this cultural festival to see all of Uzbekistan come together in Khiva. We have enjoyed different cultural performances, met many artisans, it is really great! I enjoyed the energy in the city today. The festival brought together many people from all over Uzbekistan and a lot of tourists who came specially for the festival. I appreciate the work of the Fund Forum to highlight different aspects of culture, because it is very important to make sure that none of these traditions is lost. When you go through the Ichan-Qala gate you feel like you`re passing through the gate of time. For us, Americans, this is truly interesting because our country is comparatively young and our history is not that deep and rich.

— Molly Stevenson - Embassy of the United States in Uzbekistan

“Our collaboration with the Fund Forum is fruitfully developing for the years, particularly in organizing the festival. We are very happy, because culture is essential part for the UNESCO. In this country, in such cities like Khiva, Bukhara, Samarkand we have to work to preserve not only the historical heritage, not only the ruins, the walls the fortress, the castles, the palaces, the madrassas, but also the living heritage, that has been sometimes intangible heritage. This is a young country, it is only 18 years, but it's an old nation, thousand years. It is important to keep a balance between the past and the present and the future in order to preserve this heritage for the new generation. And this festival is also meant to refill our willing to preserve our culture. The most important thing is that this festival is not only about music, there are also dances, handicrafts, workshops, national cuisine, the scientific conference and even sports as national wrestling Kurash, ram fights, cock fights. Everything is part of the culture. As a representative of UNESCO I want to say that we are very happy to work with the Fund Forum and its chairperson Gulnara Karimova. We have very good relations with the Fund Forum and now we are looking forward for extending our cooperation not only in culture, but also in education and sciences. The potential of this collaboration is big and we are really optimistic about it.”

— Jorge Espinal - UNESCO Representative in Uzbekistan

We are stunned by this holiday. Khiva is usually a quiet place, a very peaceful place, but today it's bustling! All that is happening here today reminds me of folk festivals in ancient castles on the river Rhine in France. I think that organizing this kind of festivals is good, first of all, for children because it's one thing to read about this in history books, but it's quite another to see living history with your own eyes.

— Hugues Pernet - Ambassador of France to Uzbekistan

=== 2011 ===
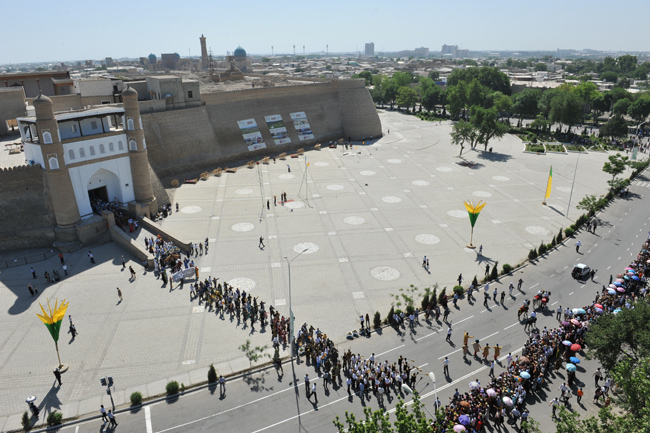
Asrlar Sadosi. Bukhara 2011

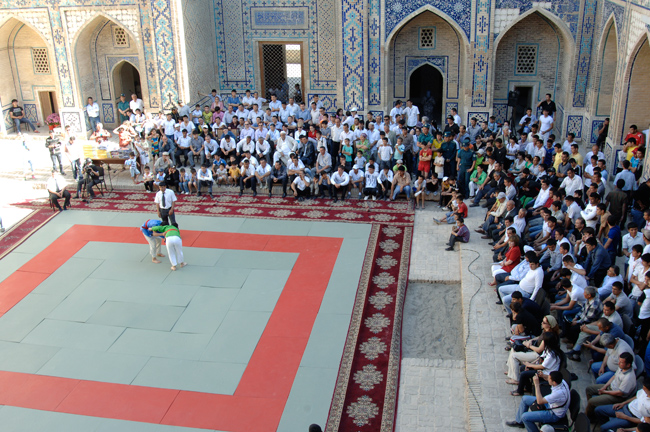
Asrlar Sadosi. Kurash National Wrestling, Bukhara 2011

In 2011, Asrlar Sadosi happened in the ancient city of Bukhara with over 20,000 participants. A group of archaeologists had unexpectedly stumbled across a bath complex believed to be 1,000 years old during excavations near Magoki-Attori Mosque and Toki Telpak Furushon Dome in Bukhara. On April 30, the archaeologists did a presentation on the stunning find as part of the Festival. The visitors could experience how back in the days Silk Road travelers had rest and recovered from the exhausting journey in a partially restored historical caravanserai (inn).

The Asrlar Sadosi 2011 cultural events were the roundtable "Film festivals, a phenomenon of contemporary world culture", which brought together leading representatives of national cinema, and a fashion show by Uzbek designers. Another event presented the book "Masterpieces of Architectural Epigraphy in Uzbekistan", published by the Fund Forum with contributions from Muslim clerics in Uzbekistan, heads and teachers of religious schools, the clergy of Bukhara region, madrasa students from different cities of the country and journalists. During the presentation the Chairperson of the Public Council of Mehr Nuri Foundation, Gulnara Karimova, awarded 50 grants to the most talented students of Muslim educational institutions as well as grant assistance in the form of material and technical means to 10 spiritual educational institutions of Uzbekistan.

Like in previous years, the guests had the opportunity to attend the National Dress Festival near the ancient Kukeldash Madrassah. Famous Japanese calligrapher Koichi Honda showed his art on April 30 at Nodir Divanbegi Madrasah in Bukhara as part of the Festival. Over 100,000 people visited the "Dedication to Holy Bukhara" art show to see the twenty-three exquisite works by Honda. Some of Honda's calligraphic masterpieces can be found in the British Museum in London.

=== 2012 ===
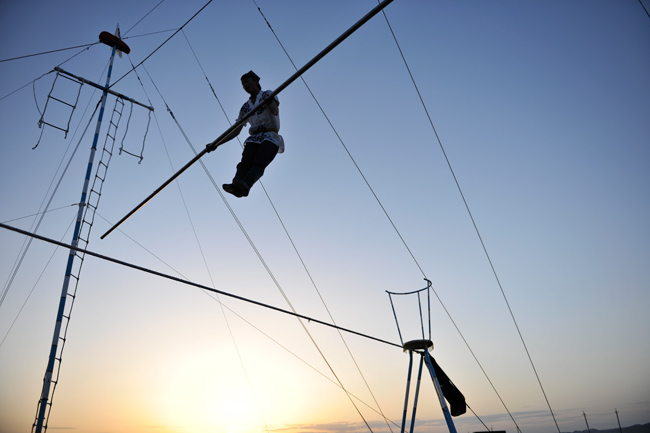
Asrlar Sadosi, Performances by tightrope walkers and wrestlers, Karakalpakstan 2012

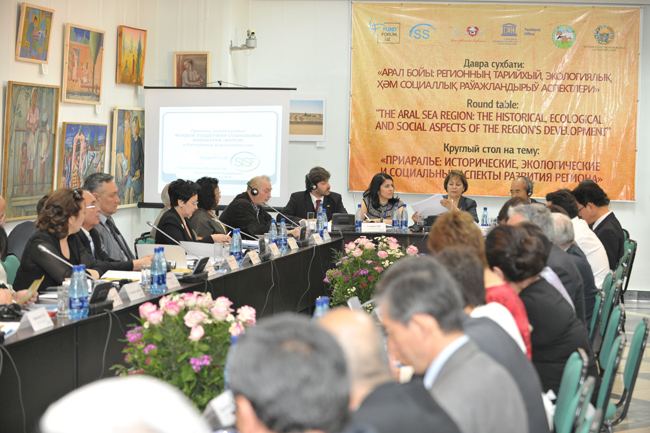
Asrlar Sadosi, Roundtable "The Aral Sea Region: the Historical, Ecological and Social Aspects of the Region’s Development", Karakalpakstan 2012

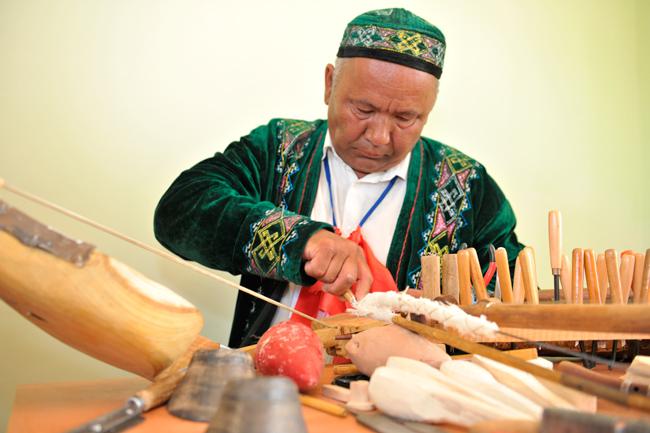
Inauguration of a workshop on the creation of traditional musical instruments, Karakalpakstan 2012

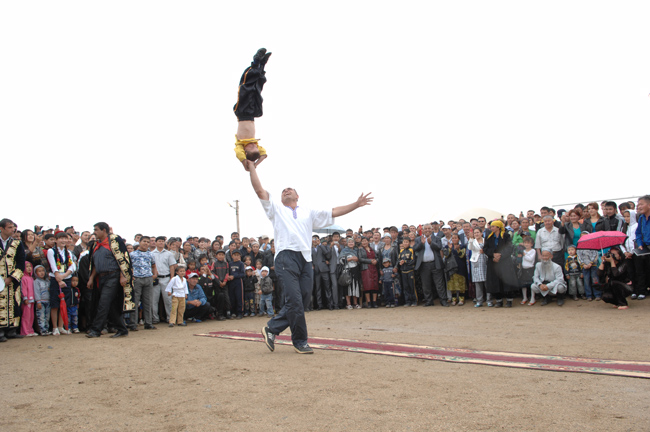
Asrlar Sadosi 2012, Karakalpakstan

The fifth Asrlar Sadosi Festival of Traditional Culture was held in Ellikqala District in Karakalpakstan (northwestern Uzbekistan) near Tuproq Qala ancient fortress. Around 50,000 people attendant the Asrlar Sadosi Festival in 2012.

This year's highlight was an exhibition of Akhal-Teke horses, whose beauty, grace and skills had been charming people around the world for 5,000 years. Scores of motley yurts, pavilions, and cafes offering national culinary delights were mounted at the foot of the Tuproq Qala citadel while young lads dressed like warriors were standing as historical guards on top of the old walls of the fortress along its perimeter.

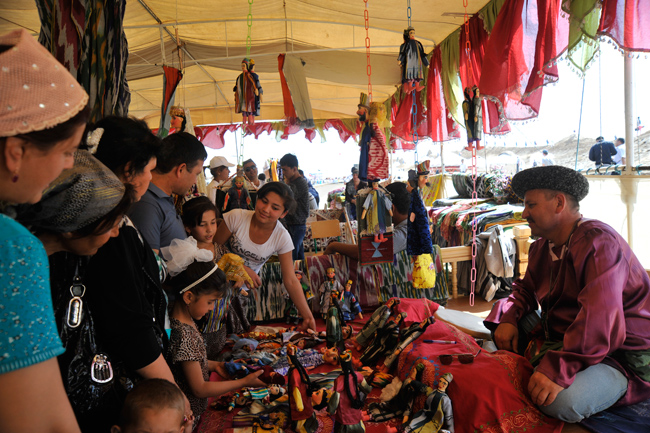
Asrlar Sadosi Applied Art Fair, Karakalpakstan 2012

The capital city of Karakalpakstan, Nukus, opened a studio for making traditional Karakalpaki music instruments and ran a specialised workshop. “The Aral Sea Region: the Historical, Ecological and Social Aspects of the Region’s Development” roundtable happened in the Savistsky Museum of Art.

“I believe that this Festival will tell the whole world about Karakalpakstan this year. We attach a lot of importance to collaboration with Uzbekistan in this area as France ranks first in Uzbekistan in terms of the number of tourists here.”

— Francois Gautier - the Ambassador of France to Uzbekistan

“I have a keen interest in Uzbek culture and I am eager to see with my own eyes everything that will take place as part of this year’s festival. I am honored by the opportunity to attend the Festival because I know it’s going to be a very interesting experience.”

— Chon De-wan - the Ambassador of South Korea to Uzbekistan

“Nukus is a city of contrasts as you can find deserts and oases, and the people here are incredible friendly and hospitable.”

— Guy Vesey, Director of Christie’s

“This is my first time in Uzbekistan. I was particularly impressed by the National Dress Show because learning about current trends in fashion is what I’ve been doing all my life. I find Uzbek designers’ ideas very interesting.”

— Mario Boselli, the President of Camera Nazionale della Moda

“I want to express my thanks to the organizers of Asrlar Sadosi Festival of Traditional Culture. This is an amazing project which brings nations, cultures and histories closer together.”

— Koichiro Maccura, Special Advisor to the UNESCO Director-General

=== 2013 ===
In 2013, the Festival was held on May 4–5 in the Sarmishsai Gorge (Navoi Region), which has included a broad array of events putting the spotlight on Uzbekistan's cultural and historical legacy while drawing a decent amount of international attention. It therefore makes sense to highlight figures that reflect the festival's scope. This year's ‘Echo of Centuries’ Festival drew a huge audience and spectatorship totaling over 100,000 people, with another 1,500 participating in the events. Twenty-two folk groups from various Uzbek regions staged performances and showcased their art, skills and costumes during the two-day cultural celebration. Around 80 craftsmen and women (applied art masters) from across Uzbekistan brought thousands of unique handmade items to the Festival. Sixteen chefs from Uzbek regions demonstrated impressive culinary skills at the National Cuisine Festival held as part of Asrlar Sadosi. The National Dress Festival presented 15 collections by designers from Samarkand, Bukhara, Tashkent, Ferghana and Andijan. The traditional uloq-kopkari horse-riding game featured over 100 horsemen. Seven pairs of gamecocks demonstrated combat prowess in cockfighting matches while fifteen pairs of rams locked horns in ram fighting rounds. A hundred wrestlers vied for victory in tournaments of kurash, a type of wrestling central to Uzbek tradition. Nearly 300 volunteers affiliated with ‘Kelajak Ovozi’ (Voice of the Future) Center for Youth Initiatives were involved in preparations for the festival. Two international conferences focused on the role of culture in sustainable development and architectural epigraphy in Uzbekistan. Six books on architectural epigraphy in Bukhara, Navoi, Andijan, Namangan, Khiva and Karakalpakstan were presented as part of the architectural epigraphy conference. Twenty students from 10 madrasas were awarded scholarships as part of the annual Program of Support for Spiritual Enlightenment.
