= Culture of Peace Festival =

Annual festival in Tel Aviv, Israel

The Israel Culture of Peace festival (Hebrew: פסטיבל תרבות של שלום) is a week-long festival, held annually in May, since 2001. The Festival is held at Tel Aviv's Tzavta Hall, which is a partner and producer of the festival. Performances are also held in different venues around the country, including the Migdal David museum in Jerusalem and the Petah Tikva culture hall. So far, the festival has held performances in Nazareth, Sachnnin, Akko and Haifa.

The Culture of Peace Festival is a common ground for artists of different cultures and beliefs, collaborating in musical performances, theatre and plastic art. It also has street performances, children's theatre, and special multi-cultural collaborations. The Festival's annual line up includes Jewish, Arab, Christian and other religious traditional music, Arab and Hebrew theatre, Oriental dance performances, classical music, both western and oriental and more.

The Culture of Peace Festival is supported by the Rosa Luxemburg fund and the Havatzelet fund, Produced by 'Tzavta'. The Festival's founder and artistic director is Eli Grunfeld.
