= Public holidays in Christmas Island =

This is a list of public holidays in Christmas Island.

== Public holidays ==
Date	Name
1 January	New Year's Day
26 January	Australia Day
Varies	Chinese New Year (2 days)
Fourth Monday in March	Labour Day
Varies	Good Friday
25 April	Anzac Day
Varies	Eid al-Fitr
Varies	Eid al-Adha
First Monday in October	Territory Day
25 December	Christmas
26 December	Boxing Day

== See also ==
- Public holidays in Australia
