= Hong Kong People's Fringe Festival =

Hong Kong People's Fringe Festival (Chinese: 香港藝穗民化節) is a month-long open-access multi-arts festival held annually in Hong Kong.

Initiated by the arts community in 2012, proposed by Hong Kong People's Fringe Association, the first festival showcased more than 50 art groups, 72 events and 42 alternative venues all over Hong Kong. The 4th Hong Kong People's Fringe Festival took place in 2015, and the festival had a sabbatical in 2016.

== History ==
The founders of the Hong Kong People's Fringe Festival were stage director, Chan Chu Hei, choreographer-musician Julia Mok, composer-guitarist Chan Wai Fat, and lighting designer-cinematographer Gabriel Fung. After visiting the Edinburgh Festival Fringe, the four friends discussed possibilities of organizing a similar festival that would encompass every possible form of art. It was also an effort to build a network amongst the smaller alternative venues. It took one year from the announcement of the festival in November 2011 to the actual festival period, November 23 to December 15, 2012. Ho Ying Fung, stage director and scenographer contributed the festival's first logo.

== Festival Period ==
The first festival spanned from November 23 to December 15, 2012. The three-week festival then stretched one week longer in the second year and took place earlier in the year from November 1 to December 1, 2013. The third festival took place in 2014, and the fourth in 2015.

== Slogan ==
- 2015 Invigorate Freely, the City Blossoms!
- 2014 Space.Revolution. Freedom.Senses
- 2013 Space, Imagination, Freedom, Flight!
- 2012 When People Act, the City Reacts!

== Categories ==
The registered events are roughly organized into categories, which vary each year. Initially, they were Theatre, Dance and Physical Theatre, Music, Site Specific, Multi-media, Children's Show, Poetry and Literature, Festival-in-Festival, Workshop and Seminar, Film, Visual Art, Miscellaneous. In 2013, the Music+Dance category was introduced. In 2014, Puppetry and Comedy were added. In 2015, Magic became a category.

== Venues ==
The wide variety of venues sets People's Fringe apart from other mainstream festivals in Hong Kong. In 2012, There were 42 alternative venues consisting of rehearsal rooms, studio theatres, live houses, bookstores, tailor shops, cafés, hair salons, galleries, rooftops, beaches, and on the street. In 2013, churches, a rural village, a fruit plantation were added to the list.

== How to Join ==
- Show Registration

A participant needs to choose a venue to present the work, liaise with the venue so the show time can be set. The policy of every venue is different but there are some venues that would give a discount to participants to People's Fringe participants. There is a list of venues on the festival website but the participant is not limited to it. Then a registration form is to be completed, together with images for the show. There is no selection process. Everyone is welcome. Registration is open until the end of the festival and is for free.

- Venue Registration

Venue registration is open for any venue that intends to offer space and services for the festival participants. There is no charge.

- Volunteer Registration

There is a spectrum of work that volunteers can be involved in. From poster-posting to onsite-helping to foreign guests assisting, a young volunteer gets to be involved in festival management.

== Partners ==
One of the focuses of the HK People's Fringe Festival is to encourage collaboration and partnership between art and society. In 2014, People's Fringe partnered with FringeBacker to crowdfund for the events. A media partner from 2014, Arttalk is a collective of writers and critics for the theatre. HKELD.com, also a media partner from 2014, is a website introducing theatre events to non-Chinese speakers in Hong Kong. Art-mate, a ticketing partner, offers a discount to participants of the festival to use their online ticketing service.
