= Embossing =

Emboss, embosser, or embossing may refer to:

== Process ==
The term usually refers to several techniques for creating a raised pattern on a material:

- Embossing (manufacturing), commercial scale embossing of sheet metal
- Image embossing, the process to create highlights or shadows that will replace light/dark boundaries of an image
- Leather embossing
- Paper embossing, the raising of paper and other non-metal products using specific tools to accomplish the task
  - Embossed in register (EIR) aligns embossing with an underlying image
- Repoussé and chasing, by hammering sheet metal by hand

== Equipment ==
- Handheld embossers, see embossing tape
- Braille embosser, an impact printer that renders text as tactile braille cells

== Other uses ==
- EMBOSS, an acronym for European Molecular Biology Open Software Suite
- Embossing, a modification performed on harmonicas, narrowing reeds for the technique of overblowing
