= Hong Kong Green Jazz Festival =

Annual music festival in Hong Kong

Hong Kong Green Jazz Festival (Chinese: 香港青年爵士音樂節) is an annual music festival held in Hong Kong, which incorporates local live jazz music. The first Festival took place on 30 December 2012, in the Cattle Depot Artist Village (牛棚藝術村). It was founded on 6 August 2012, and organized by "Original Sound", which aims to provide platforms for youngsters whose skills or psychological qualities may not be able to meet the international levels to share their music.

== Organizer ==
"Original Sound" is a non-profit organization which aims to encourage the interactivity and creativity of sound and multimedia art. They also contribute to the promotion of community culture and enhance citizens' engagement in developing local art culture.

== Location ==
Since the Festival is hosted by a non-profit organization, the Cattle Depot Artist Village was chosen as the venue of the event without any renting cost. Cattle Depot Artist Village is a piece of institutional land for art performers to develop their art career. For instance, artists can rent the land for studio usage or art performance.

== Purposes of promoting local Jazz music ==
Music education has become more popular due to the development of information and communication technology. With this favorable condition, the number of teens playing jazz music has grown substantially. However, local jazz is hard to be widespread as Hong Kong audiences are more interested in reputed western music instead of indigenous one. Thus, young jazz musicians lack a platform to perform. In view of that, the Festival acts as an intermediate to allow these enthusiastic adolescents to perform music and promote the innovation of the new generation of jazz musicians, who are intended to spread the culture of jazz music to teenagers.

== Hong Kong Green Jazz Festival 2012 ==
The first Hong Kong Green Festival was held on Sunday, 30 December 2012, at Cattle Depot Artist Village without charging any entrance fee. In view of that, it attracts teenagers to join especially for students who cannot afford the charge of music performance or concerts. At the end of the day, there were around 400 live audiences for five bands formed by youth performers and two guest performer-bands.
