= Coma Dance Festival =

- Genre: Electronic dance music
- Dates: 14–15 November 2008
- Locations: Abu Dhabi, UAE; Forum de Beirut, Lebanon
- Years active: 2008
- Founders: Andreas Konstantinidis, Ram Nath
- Capacity: 5000

Dance Music Festival which took place on 14 November 2008, twenty minutes of the coast of Abu Dhabi, UAE and 15 November in Forum de Beirut, Lebanon. The festival were proclaimed the first festival dedicated to dance music in the Middle East.

== Artists ==
Abu Dhabi 14 November 2008

Main Stage : Marco V, ATB, Cosmic Gate, Meat Katie.

Pool Stage: Sandy Rivera, DJ Bliss.

Beirut 15 November 2008 : Christopher Lawrence, John Acquaviva, Cosmic Gate, John '00' Fleming, Lee Haslam.

== See also ==
- Middle Eastern dance
- List of electronic music festivals
- Live electronic music
- music of lebanon
