= Aluth Sahal Mangallaya =

Sri Lankan harvest festival

The Aluth Sahal Mangalle or the New Rice Festival is a harvest festival of the Maha kannaya in Sri Lanka. The first batch of new rice after being plucked, threshed and winnowed is offered to the Buddha and deities.

Every January Poya Day, new rice festival commences. Rice and paddy donated to Temple of the Tooth are stored at Kundasale Pallekele in a separate location allocation and distribution of Rice and paddy to Devales relevant, is done. A traditional procession takes place from the Palace to Kundasale headed by Diyawadaered to the sacred tooth relic.

Only after the new rice festival at the Sri Dalada Maligawa and offering rice to the sacred tooth relic, can the farmers around the country collect their harvest and commence their own new rice festivals in the respective villages.

The most important new rice festival that happens afterwards is the Aluth Sahal Mangalle at the Sri Maha Bodhi in Anuradhapura.

This festival was started by a king called Sri weera parakrama narendrasinghe in 1707. Diyawadana Nilame does the main part in this festival. This is about the first harvest in paddy situated in kundasale. Diyawadana nilame and the rest of the people got Kundasale with perahara and take the harvest and come back to the temple of tooth relic. This is done in nice fashion always, according to the tradition these traditions are done in much respect, for tooth relic of Buddha. A man called Nakath Mohottala also does a main part in this festival. He prepares an agenda called 'Nakth pathraya' and whole things were done on it.
