= Fu Yang Festival =

Chinese festival

The Fu Yang Festival (Chinese: 伏羊节) is a traditional festival celebrated by local residents in Xuzhou, an ancient city located in the northwest of Jiangsu province. The festival starts on the day of Chufu (Chinese: 初伏) which is around mid-July according to the lunar calendar (about 27 days after the summer solstice) and lasts for nearly one month. In China, "Fu" (Chinese: 伏) refers to the hottest days in summer. As is known to us all, mutton (including goat, sheep, lamb) is a kind of hot food which may make people sweat when they are eating——that's why in most parts of China people choose to eat mutton in cold winter day rather than in summer. However, in Xuzhou, people act in a diametrically opposite way, they enjoy being bathed in sweat as well as tasting the delicious dishes made from mutton under the burning hot sun.

During Peng Zu's time, there was a common custom of eating sheep in Xuzhou. The Yang Fang Hidden in the Fish (Chinese: 羊方藏鱼) created by Peng Zu was the sublimation of the sheep cooking skills of that era.

According to the "Book of Han" records, the emperor "gave meat to his subordinates in the late morning." The "official meat" at that time was mutton, the first of the "three animals", and there was no doubt that Emperor Futian shared mutton with his ministers. Not only were sheep eaten in the palace, there was also a record in the "Book of Han Dynasty" that "the Tian family worked hard, and when they were old, they cooked sheep, canned lambs, and fought with wine to work themselves out." (田家作苦，岁时伏腊，烹羊炮羔，斗酒自劳)

However, little is known that eating mutton cooked with pepper, chili, cumin or other hot condiments during summer days is of great benefit to people's health according to Chinese traditional medicine in that it can save your body from the cold and prepare you well for the northern chilly weather when autumn and winter come along. This folk custom has been in existence for thousands of years and has significantly contributed to the local culture, making it more abundant, colorful and meaningful. During the one-month festival, all restaurants in Xuzhou recommend their best dishes to the diners, hoping to satisfy them and do good business. Other restaurants in the surrounding areas who own flavor characteristics are warmly welcomed to come to the city center and demonstrate their regional food. During that period of time, people in Xuzhou are also able to enjoy various kinds of displays which show the long history of their home city. For example, there are traditional opera, martial arts, the Chinese Kung fu, goat-fight, paper-cut, Shadow Play Puppet, and numbers of flower or stone or bird shows. In Fu Yang Festival, people gather for celebration. They eat mutton and drink mutton soup. This festival is very popular among all the citizens and has greatly enhanced the attractive power of Xuzhou.

== External sources ==
- "徐州"伏羊节"商标注册之争 Xuzhou "Fu Yang Festival" trademark dispute - Internet Archive copy". 22 July 2011. Archived from the original on April 25, 2012.
