= Irrawaddy Literary Festival =

Event in Myanmar celebrating writers

The Irrawaddy Literary Festival is a not-for-profit event run entirely by volunteers which celebrates Myanmar and international writers. It is planned to take place regularly every one or two years in Myanmar. The inaugural Festival was described by the (then) British Foreign Secretary, William Hague, as having “achieved more for freedom of speech in one afternoon than most of us manage in a lifetime.” The inaugural Festival was held at the Inya Lake Hotel in Yangon, subsequent Festivals have been held at the Mandalay Hills Resort Hotel in Mandalay.

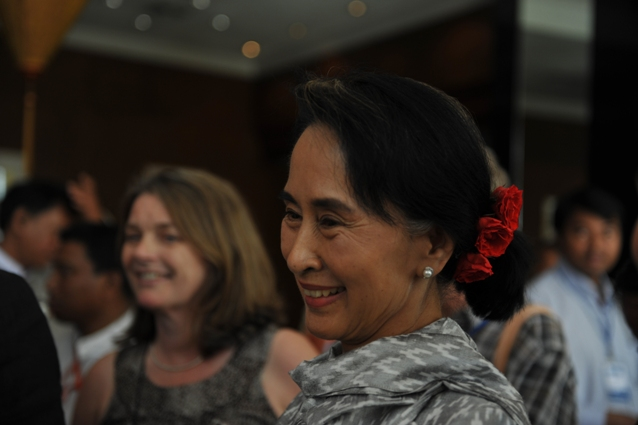
Aung San Suu Kyi, Festival Patron, and Jane Heyn, Festival Founder

The Festival was founded by Jane Heyn, wife of the former British Ambassador to Myanmar, in 2013, and is supported by Festival patron and Nobel Peace Prize winner, Aung San Suu Kyi.

The fifth Irrawaddy Literary Festival took place 9–11 November 2019. This Festival marked the transition of the Festival from the international board to local Myanmar organisers, led by Sayar U Nay Oke This fifth and final Festival under the auspices of the international board was described by participant and Asia editor at The Times, Richard Lloyd-Parry, as "uniquely charming"

All sponsorship funding is used to produce the Festival; no salaries or fees are paid to anyone involved and attendance at all events is totally free.

On 2 May 2018 at a press conference held in Yangon, the international board of the Irrawaddy Literary Festival and the Myanmar organisers announced the establishment of a Myanmar Board which would assume responsibility for the organisation of future Festivals as was planned by the founding director Jane Heyn and the Festival's patron, Aung San Suu Kyi. The Myanmar board is headed by chair, Saya U Nay Oke and vice-chair Dr Aung Myint.

The Festival presents three days of discussion panels, workshops and individual talks from the authors, along with a variety of cultural activities: film screenings, photography and art exhibitions and street entertainers. Local businesses join the three-day event by setting up food and handicraft stalls. The participating international authors' books are imported and available at the Festival's abundance of bookstalls alongside the works of hundreds of Burmese writers.

The Irrawaddy Literary Festivals have been covered by global news organisations such as the BBC, CNN, Wall Street Journal, the Guardian, the New York Times, and the New York Review of Books.

It has also been rated as one of the world's best Literary Festivals in the Sunday Times, Time Magazine, Time Out, the South China Morning Post, the book lovers website Novelicious, Asia House and the Festival Sherpa website.

== 2013 ==
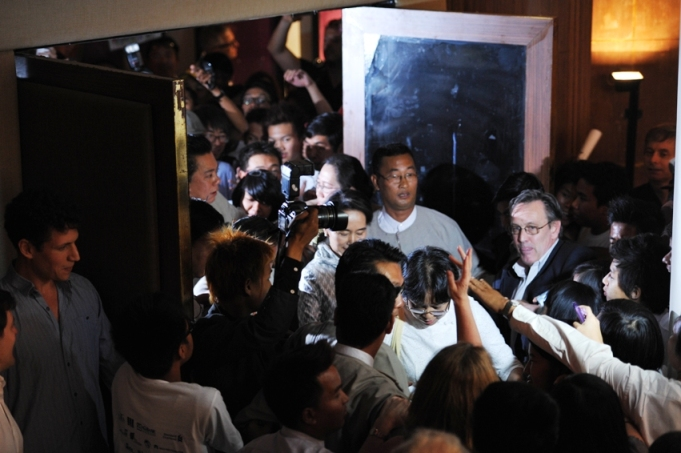
Aung San Suu Kyi's arrival

In 2013 the first Irrawaddy Literary Festival took place from the 1st to the 3rd of February in the Inya Lake Hotel in Yangon with Aung San Suu Kyi as the Festival’s key note speaker. Other participants included Wild Swans author Jung Chang, A Suitable Boy author Vikram Seth, and historian William Dalrymple. Burmese writers included Thant Myint-U, author of The River of Lost Footsteps, and Pascal Khoo Thwe, author of From the Land of Green Ghosts. Also in attendance was BBC journalist Fergal Keane, and photojournalist Thierry Falise.

The Festival drew a crowd of approximately 10,000 attendees.

== 2014 ==
At the second Irrawaddy Literary Festival Aung San Suu Kyi, Jung Chang, and Fergal Keane returned as keynote speakers, along with newcomers Louis De Bernieres (Captain Corelli's Mandolin), Polly Devlin (All Of Us There) and Caroline Moorehead (Martha Gelhorn: A Life).

The event was initially due to take place in the Kuthodaw Pagoda, a UNESCO World Heritage Site located in Mandalay, but permission that had previously been granted was retracted a day before the opening of the Festival. The ILF was then relocated to the Mandalay Hill Resort Hotel, where the event opened less than one hour behind schedule.

== 2015 ==
The third Irrawaddy Literary Festival took place in Mandalay — at Mandalay Hill Resort Hotel — from 28 to 30 March 2015. International award winning authors and journalists took part, including Louis de Bernières (Captain Corelli's Mandolin), Anne Enright, (The Gathering), Barnaby Phillips (Another Man's War), Ratna Vira (Daughter by Court Order), Colin Falconer and Margaret Simons, along with scores of Burmese writers from all parts of the country including Pe Myint, Khin Maung Nyo, U Nay Oke, Soe Lin, Thantzin, Nay Phone Latt, Nyein Way, Aung Gyi, Thint Naw, and Thin Ma Ma Khaing. A team of thirty volunteer interpreters provided simultaneous translation for audiences throughout the Festival's three day packed programme.

== 2017 ==
The Irrawaddy Literary Festival 2017 was held from 3–5 November. It followed the established model of a three-day free to enter event with simultaneous interpretation available in all sessions. Over 4000 people attended, the majority from Myanmar. The programme included sessions on inter-communal violence and reconciliation with participation by senior representatives of the Buddhist and Muslim faiths. In addition to the programmed sessions there were popular informal speaking opportunities at Speakers’ Corner and (new for 2017) Poets’ Corner in the grounds of the hotel.

The gathering included Lonely Planet co-founder Tony Wheeler, Jung Chang (Wild Swans) Keggie Carew (Dadland) and other writers, nearly one hundred of them from Myanmar including Shwegu May Hnin, Ju, Nay Phone Latt, Yin Yin Nu, Ponnya Khin, Yi Yi Mon.

== 2018 ==
On 2 May 2018, at the Pullman Centrepoint Hotel in Yangon, the international board of the Irrawaddy Literary Festival and the Myanmar chair and vice-chair of the newly formed Myanmar Board of the ILF announced the official transfer of the Festival's organisation to the Myanmar Board, with the Festival to remain free to enter, paying no salaries or fees to anyone.

== 2019 ==
The Fifth Festival took place from 9–11 November 2019 at the Mercure Mandalay Hotel in Mandalay. The three day programme of events included the usual mix of panel discussions, individual readings, workshops, poetry, films, exhibitions and book stalls. Around eighty Myanmar and thirty international writers took part, with simultaneous interpretation once again for all sessions.
