= Hidden Agenda (live house) =

Live music club in Kwun Tong, Hong Kong

- HA
- Interactive map of Hidden Agenda
- Address: G/F Hung To Industrial Building, 80 Hung To Road, Kwun Tong, Hong Kong
- Coordinates: 22.315819°N 114.215833°E
- Capacity: 500
- Type: Music venue

Construction
- Opened: 2009

Website
- hiddenagenda.hk

Hidden Agenda was a live house located in the industrial area of Kwun Tong, Hong Kong. It opened in January 2009 and has since then relocated twice due to rising rents and the violation of permitted land uses (that excludes the operation of cultural venues in industrial buildings). The live house staged its final show in July 2017 and was officially closed in October 2017.

== Background ==
The current venue is about 4,000 sqf (approximately 370 sqm) and can hold up to 300 people. It is often referred to as the Hong Kong version of the legendary CBGB in New York. Hidden Agenda stages around 60 shows every year across genres such as rock, heavy metal, jazz, folk, punk, post-rock, reggae, visual rock, hip-hop, experimental noise, techno etc.

=== Licensing difficulties ===
Having originally been a rehearsal space for a local band, the original Hidden Agenda quickly developed into a place for local and touring indie bands to perform. Kwun Tong was a popular space for this as many large spaces were available in the industrial suburb, with landlords willing to accept musicians as tenants after the SARS outbreak in Hong Kong made finding tenants for such spaces difficult. In 2011, Hidden Agenda was involved in a dispute with the Hong Kong Lands Department. The department had received a complaint that the venue was operating outside of the terms of its lease, and the department was forced to investigate.

== Services and facilities ==
In addition to offering a venue for performances, promotion, and other related services, Hidden Agenda also contains a small shop on the premises which sells CDs and other merchandise from local Hong Kong bands.

== Media coverage ==
It received the award Time Out Best Venue of 2010 from Time Out Hong Kong. In addition, Hidden Agenda has received a significant amount of exposure from international and overseas media. Hidden Agenda was cited by the UK's The Guardian newspaper as one of the "Top 10 Bars and Clubs in Hong Kong" in 2012.

In 2012, Hidden Agenda created a film to document the history of the venue, which was subsequently featured at the 2012 Venice Architecture Biennale. The installation was intended to explore the development of a creative and artistic culture in the industrial areas of West Kowloon, drawing reference to the fact that many of these establishments, like Hidden Agenda, are actually illegal.

== Notable performances ==
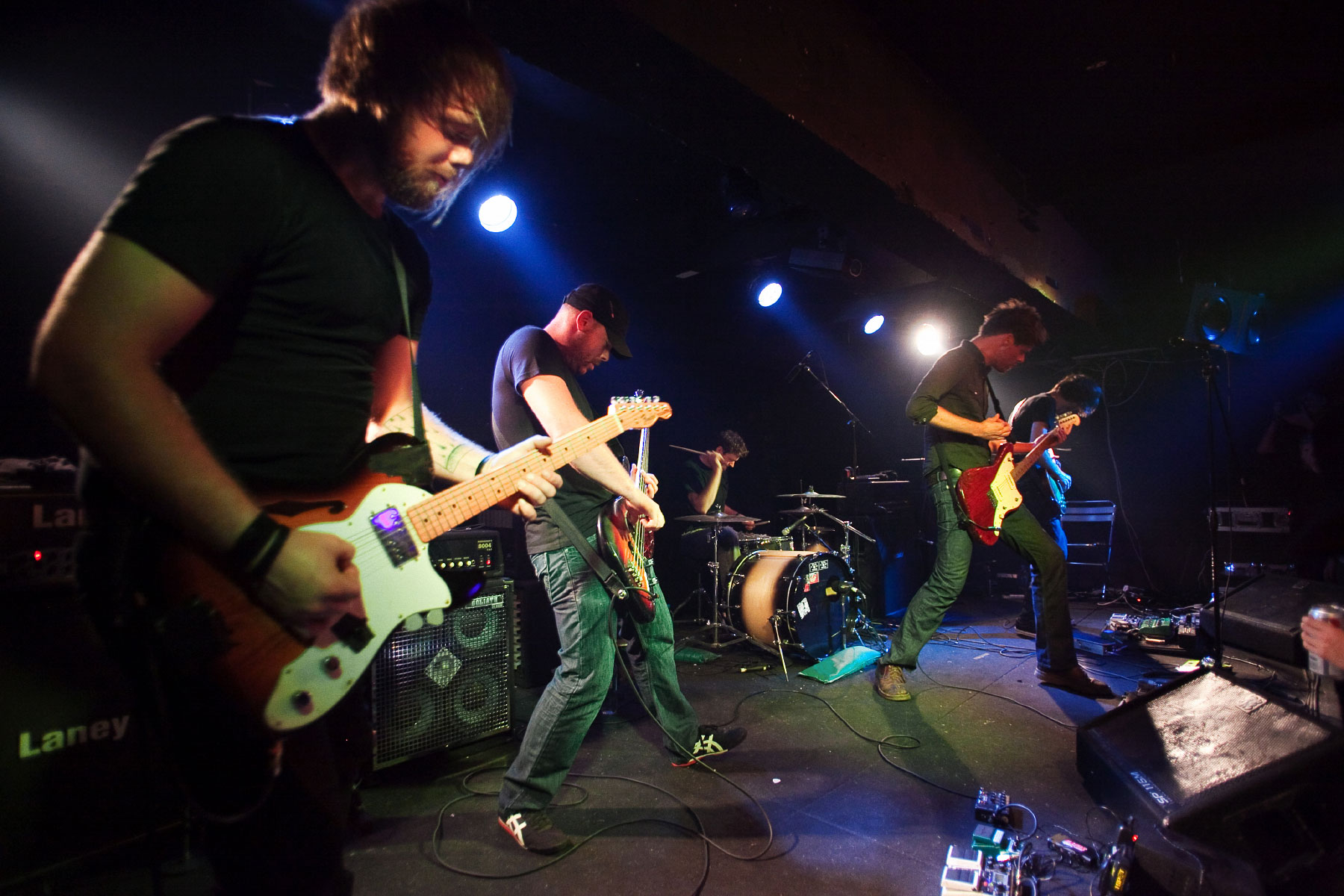
Caspian performing in Hong Kong at Hidden Agenda, 2010

Bands that performed in Hidden Agenda include: Anti-Flag, Gallows, Drowning Pool, HammerFall, Kalmah, Sick of It All, Caspian, Fucked Up, Queen Sea Big Shark, FM3, Jan Linton, Hedgehog, Carsick Cars, Nova Heart, My Little Airport, King Ly Chee, 22 Cats, The Bollands, This Will Destroy You, No One Remains Virgin, 意色樓 (An Id Signal), Tux, Acid Mothers Temple & The Melting Paraiso U.F.O., King Khan & the BBQ Show and Residence A (A公馆).

A number of heavy metal bands of varying genres had performed, including Vader, Warbringer, Suicide Silence, Kalmah, HammerFall, Evocation (aka 招魂), Fleshgod Apocalypse, Charmcharmchu, Synergy, Arkona (Russian: Аркона) and Tainted Dickman.
