= Genjing Records =

Chinese record label

- Founded: 2011
- Founder: Nevin Domer
- Distributor: Far Out Distant Sounds
- Genre: Various
- Country of origin: China
- Location: Beijing
- Official website: genjingrecords.com

Genjing Records (simplified Chinese: 根茎唱片; traditional Chinese: 根莖唱片) is a vinyl-only independent record label in Beijing, China focused on contributing recordings of Chinese musicians into global scene and vinyl record culture.

== Background ==
Since its inception in March 2011, Genjing Records has issued dozens of 7-inch singles, 10-inch EPs, and LPs from bands such as AM444, Demerit, Dear Eloise, Duck Fight Goose, the Fever Machine, Gum Bleed, Round Eye, Snapline, Wang Wen (罔聞) and Fanzui Xiangfa. At its inception in 2011, the label was only conceived as a platform through which founder Nevin Domer's local Beijing hardcore band Fanzui Xiangfa (犯罪想法) could release and distribute their own recordings on vinyl records during a European tour with the German hardcore band SS20 . The success of this first release provided encouragement for developing Genjing Records into a full, vinyl-only independent record label in China. Nevin had also noticed that the renewed global interest in vinyl records he experienced during the Fanzu Xiangfa European Tour was also beginning to take root in China with a nascent record collecting community. Nevin then formally established the mission of Genjing Records as a means to facilitate the release of materials vinyl by Chinese bands and artists.

== Current work ==
Genjing Records has since stabilized its mission statement first around creating relationships between China's DIY independent music communities and their international counterparts. This mission is primarily facilitated by the release of split 7-inch records in cooperation with global partner labels and subsequent multinational tours in which bands criss-cross each other's countries. The label's international catalog includes releases by Cheap Stuff, Libyan Hit Squad, SS20, Sick Times, Tiny Ghosts and Tussle.

Genjing Records also seeks to more broadly support and facilitate other forms local outreach in China's various music communities. In August 2012, Genjing worked with one of the first expatriates involved in the mid-1990s Beijing punk scene, David O'Dell, to host a charity punk-rock show and auction in association with Half the Sky, a Chinese charitable organization dedicated to poor rural children. On August 19, 2012, Genjing Records was featured on DIY punk fanzine Maximumrocknroll's weekly radio show. On April 20, 2013, the label spearheaded Mainland China's participation in Record Store Day 2013.

In 2015, Genjing Records took the Melbourne band Primitive Calculators on tour in China performing at Split Works' Jue Festival in Beijing and Shanghai as well as club gigs in Xi’an, Yiwu and Wuhan. A documentary entitled "Which Way is China?" was made of the tour.

Nevin currently plays in the hardcore-punk band Struggle Session which has toured in China, Korea, Spain, Morocco, Brazil, Uruguay, Argentina, Chile, Peru, Colombia, Panama, and Australia.

== Discography ==
A full discography can be found on the label's bandcamp page.

Catalog	Artist(s)	Title	Format	Release date
GR001	Fanzui Xiangfa / Daighila	split	7”	May 2011
GR002	Fanzui Xiangfa / SS20	split	7”	May 2011
GR003	Demerit / SS20	split	10”	July 2011
GR004	Dear Eloise	Castle	7”	July 2011
GR005	Dear Eloise	Song for Her	7”	July 2011
GR006	Fanzui Xiangfa	Fanzui Xiangfa	7”	Aug 2011
GR007	Gum Bleed / Cheap Stuff / Flyx / rks	Fuck Society	2x7”	Apr 2012
GR008	Duck Fight Goose	History	7”	May 2012
GR009	Tiny Ghosts	Alien in a Box	7”	June 2012
GR010	AM444 / Tussle	Split Ends	12”	July 2012
GR011	The Fever Machine	La Chupacabra	7”	Aug 2012
GR012	Next Year's Love	Smash the Pink Bug	7”	Aug 2012
GR013	Dear Eloise	I'll Be Your Mirror	7”	Oct 2012
GR014	Gum Bleed / Sick Times	split	10”	Jan 2013
GR015	Dear Eloise	Vanishing Winter	7”	Mar 2013
GR016	Li Daiguo	Music for Advertisements	7”	Apr 2013
GR017	pg.lost / Wang Wen	split	12”	Mar 2013
GR018	Pairs / God Bows to Math	split	7”	Aug 2013
GR019	The Dyne	Swim. Fly Roots	7”	Apr 2013
GR020	Streets Kill Strange Animals	Through	7”	Oct 2013
GR021	Dear Eloise / Underground Lovers	split	7”	Aug 2013
GR022	Alpine Decline	Go Big Shadow City	LP	2014
GR023	Tom Cruise & Katie Holmes	Wo Bu Ai Ni	7”	2014
GR024	Snapline	Paper General	7”	2014
GR025	Carsick Cars / The Flavor Crystals	split	7”	2014
GR026	Little Punk	Traveling Man	postcard flexi	
GR027	The Fallacy	Painkiller	7”	2014
GR028	AV Okubo	Opium	7”	2014
GR029	Low Bow / Dinged Up	split	7”	2014
GR030	Rolling Bowling / 13 Bats	split	7”	2014
GR031	After Argument	This Is Not Your Game	LP	2014
GR032	The Yours	Public Eye	7”	2014
GR033	Deadly Cradle Death / The Telescopes	split	7”	May 2015
GR034	GUIGUISUISUI	The Court Of King Necro	7”	2014
GR035	Wang Wen	Eight Horses	LP	2014
GR036	MeToo	Frankenstein	7”	2015
GR037	Hot & Cold / Tonstartssbandht	split	7”	2014
GR038	Fanzui Xiangfa / Bad Nerve	split	7”	2014
GR039	Fanzui Xiangfa	Discography 2006~2014	LP	2014
GR040	Yang Fan	What Happened After 1,001 Nights?	LP	2015
GR041	Primitive Calculators / Torturing Nurse	split	7”	2015
GR042	The Fuzz	Golden Cage	7”	2015
GR044	Tom Cruise & Katie Holmes	A Million Farewells	LP	2015
GR045	Zhang Shouwang & Kid Millions	split	12"	2015
GR046	SMZB / DUNG	split	7"	2015
GR047	Little Monster / Negro Leo	split	7"	2016
GR048	The Diders / D.O.A.	split	7"	2017
GR049	Birdstriking / Die! Die! Die!	split	7"	2017
GR050	Die!ChiwawaDie! / Struggle Session	split	12"	2017
GR053	Arryam / Struggle Session	split	7"	2018
GR054	TEST / Struggle Session	split	7"	2018
GR055	SHAS / Alpaca	split	12"	2018
