= Hiperson =

Indie band from Chengdu

Hiperson 海朋森
- Origin: Chengdu, China
- Genres: Indie rock; Post-punk
- Years active: 2012–present
- Members: Chen Sijiang; Ji Yinan; Liu Zetong; Wang Minghui; Wang Boqiang
- Past members: Huang Rentao; Chen Qingkai

Hiperson (Chinese: 海朋森; pinyin: Hǎipéngsēn) is an indie rock band from Chengdu, China, formed in 2012. Their music includes post punk and garage rock influences, and incorporates spoken word poetry. The band currently consists of singer Chen Sijiang, guitarists Ji Yinan and Liu Zetong, bassist Wang Minghui, and drummer Wang Boqiang.

== Career ==
Hiperson was founded at the Sichuan Conservatory of Music, in the Xindu district of Chengdu, where guitarists Ji Yinan and Liu Zetong met as classmates. They met singer Chen Sijiang through a mutual friend, and formed the band with Huang Rentao on bass and Chen Qingkai on drums. The latter two were later replaced by Wang Minghui and Wang Boqiang respectively. The name of the band was conceived as a phrase, "hi, person": "like a non-human entity viewing things that occur in the human realm."

The band was signed to Maybe Mars after opening for P.K. 14. Hiperson released their debut album, No Need for Another History (Chinese: 我不要别的历史; pinyin: Wǒ bùyào bié de lìshǐ), in 2015. The album was produced by Yang Haisong and recorded at Psychic Kong Studio in Beijing. Their second album, She Came Back from the Square, was recorded live at the band's practice room in Chengdu and released in 2018. The album was inspired by conversations with taxi drivers, delivery workers, and security guards. In 2019, the band released an EP titled Four Seasons, via London-based label Damnably. The record was a departure from the more garage rock sound of their previous releases, with elements of dance music and bedroom pop. Later in 2019, they collaborated with Xi'an-based band Fazi to release a single, titled Day and Night, comprising two tracks, titled "You Turn My Face to Another Day" and "Night Walk"). The first was later used in the television drama The Long Season.

The band released their third album Bildungsroman in 2020, with the album displaying a more indie rock sound than its predecessors. Sijiang's all-Mandarin lyrics received praise from critics. The band planned to support the album with a tour of Europe and the US, as well as a performance at American music festival South by Southwest, but all were cancelled due to the COVID-19 pandemic. However, the band completed a sold-out tour of clubs across China in 2021. In 2023, They reportedly declined to participate in the Chinese music competition show The Big Band. A tour across Asia was delayed until 2024.

== Musical style ==
Bands that have influenced Hiperson include Shuh Tou, P.K. 14, Fugazi, Talking Heads, Sonic Youth, and Shellac. The sound of their 2020 album Bildungsroman was influenced by the compositions of Pauline Oliveros. Their music also includes jazz, emo, and spoken word elements, and has been compared to Siouxsie and the Banshees. Their recording style varies drastically between albums, from the unpolished style of She Came Back from the Square and No Need for Another History to the clean, professional studio recordings of Bildungsroman.

== Discography ==
=== Studio albums ===
Date of release	Album	Producer	Label
20 April 2015	我不要别的历史 (No Need For Another History)	Yang Haisong	Maybe Mars
3 May 2018	她从广场回来 (She Came Back From the Square)		Maybe Mars
24 July 2020	成长小说 (Bildungsroman)	Ji Yinan	

=== EPs ===
- 15 November 2019 - Four Seasons EP

=== Singles ===
- 13 November 2019 - 昼夜 (in collaboration with FAZI)
