= Maybe Mars =

Independent record label

- Founded: 2007
- Founder: Michael Pettis
- Distributor: Far Out Distant Sounds
- Genre: Various
- Country of origin: China
- Location: Beijing
- Official website: Maybe Mars

Maybe Mars is an independent record label founded in 2007. Their current catalogue includes Carsick Cars, Hiperson, P.K.14, Joyside, Snapline, SMZB, and Dear Eloise, among others.

== Current Artists ==
- Carsick Cars
- Snapline
- Demerit
- SMZB
- P.K.14
- WHITE
- Oh! Dirty Fingers
- Hiperson
- Dear Eloise
- Dream Can
- AV Okubo
- Birdstriking
- Chui Wan
- FAZI
- Lonely Leary
- Alpine Decline
- The Bedstars
- Future Orients
- Backspace
- Deadly Cradle Death
- Run Run Run

== Alumni Artists ==
- Joyside
- Low Wormwood
- Ourself Beside Me
- The Gar
- Xiao He
- (((10)))
- Hot & Cold
- Ex-Punishment
- Muscle Snog
- 8 Eye Spy
- Liu Kun
- Guai Li
- 24 Hours
- Rustic
- Skip Skip Ben Ben
- Flyx
- Old Fashion
- Traveller
- Boyz&Girl
- Mr. Graceless
- Duck Fight Goose
- The Yours
- Proximity Butterfly

== Discography ==
Catalog	Artist(s)	Title	Format	Release date
MM1	Joyside	Booze At Neptune's Dawn	CD	September 8, 2007
MM2	Carsick Cars	s/t	CD	September 8, 2007
MM3	Snapline	Party Is Over, Pornostar	CD	September 8, 2007
MM5	SMZB	Ten Years Rebellion	CD	June 1, 2008
MM6	Demerit	Bastards Of The Nation	CD	June 1, 2008
MM7	Proximity Butterfly	Reprieve	CD	May 1, 2011
MM8	Proximity Butterfly	Medusae	Digital Release	February 9, 2015
