= Carburetor Dung =

Malaysian punk rock band

- Origin: Malaysia
- Genres: Punk rock, Hardcore punk
- Years active: 1991–present
- Label: Ricecooker Recordings
- Members: Alak; Joe Kidd; Fendi; Bullet; Tom Bollocks; Tun Manan
- Website: carburetordung.kerbau.com

Carburetor Dung is a Malaysian punk rock band formed in 1991 in Kuala Lumpur. Formed by bassist Fendi as a band called Stormfish but later changed its name to Carburetor Dung when guitarist Joe Kidd joined the fold. The name came from Lester Bangs' book Psychotic Reactions and Carburetor Dung.

== History ==
Carburetor Dung released their first album, Songs For Friends in 1993. The album featured Fendi and Joe Kidd with vocalist Shahlan (of Terengganu's pioneering punk band Mallaria), drummer Lan Bear of The Infectious Maggots and lead guitarist Pari 'rasta' Fari of Against Racism of Today.

The next release came in 1999 with the mini-album The Allure of Manure. At the time, the band featured Fendi and Joe Kidd with drummer Ollie of Silent Death and vocalist Lee from The Pilgrims. Some tracks from the mini-album appeared on a 7-inch single in London in 2000. It was called Sheepfarming in Malaysia.

Between the releases, the band appeared in a few compilations and played all around the country. The band appeared on 'Dari Jemapoh ke Manchestee (Manchester)' movie directed by well-known activist Hishamuddin Rais. They contributed three songs for the soundtrack album to the movie.

The band took a break between September 1999 through to June 2002. During this hiatus, drummer Ollie joined Kuala Lumpur's ska band Gerhana Skacinta, singer Lee appeared playing didgeridoo with local surfer groups while Fendi and Joe Kidd restarted their project band from 1994, The Shitworkers with Bullet (of pioneering thrash metal bands of the mid-80s Nemesis, Punisher). The Shitworkers played a few shows and released a rehearsal CD-R.

At the end of 2002, Carburetor Dung came back to life briefly rehearsing new songs and appearing at one show before another year of limbo. In December 2003, the band returned, with original members Fendi and Joe joined by drummer Apuk (from Kuchalana); and a month later a new vocalist Alak (from the band Pusher), and Carburetor Dung started playing shows again. By late 2005, The band acquired The Shitworkers drummer Bullet. The band recorded a track for the Radio Malaya compilation in December 2005.

Between 2005 and 2007, Carburetor Dung constantly played shows in Kuala Lumpur. The band recorded 9 songs for a new album in June 2007.

In early 2008, Tom of the band The Bollocks joined the band on the other guitar, and the band went on 10-day tour of Java in May 2008, playing Jakarta, Tangerang, Bogor, Bandung and Yogyakarta. The band also continued playing shows in Malaysia for three weekends in June 2008. They visited Penang, Johor Bahru and also Singapore. During these gigs, the band put out limited copies of a self-produced 4-track CDREP Macam Celaka/Hanturaya Putrajaya.

The band embarked on a short tour of The Philippines in July 2010, playing shows in the Metro-Manila area and also the northern town of Pampanga. "1993–2007 | Still Pissed After All These Years – Philippines Tour 2010 Compilation" special compilation CD-R was released to promote the shows.

In late 2011, the band's third album "Inginku Rejam Raksasa Kejam", originally recorded in 2007, was finally released by a Berlin-based label F.A.M.E.D. on 10-inch vinyl. The album later released on CD format by the band themselves on their own label Ricecooker Recordings in early 2012. With this release, the band shortened their name to capitalised "DUNG" but still occasionally use "Carburetor Dung" when the need arises.

Throughout 2013, the band started recording four new songs at their own recording studio KerbauWorks, and in early 2015, the band announced the upcoming release of a split-7" featuring two songs from the sessions. The split-7" was released in 2015 by Beijing-based label Genjing Records, and featured two songs each from DUNG and a punk band from Wuhan-City, China, by the name of SMZB.

== Discography ==
=== Albums ===
- Songs for Friends (Audio Cassette 1993)

Track listing:

1. – Boo Hoo Clapping Song (5:36)
2. – Don't Know (2:29)
3. – Labour Of Hate (5:48)
4. – Carburetor Dance (3:01)
5. – Slam Safe Today (4:49)
6. – Property Properly (3:03)
7. – Song For A Friend (1:20)
8. – Liar (3:27)
9. – Cruel Blue Van (3:24)
10. – Bucknaked (2:46)
11. – Oppression (4:17)
12. – You're A Problem (Not A Solution) (3:23)
13. – Jump Down Lemonade (2:44)
14. – Farewell (5:21)
- The Allure of Manure (Audio Cassette 1999)

Track listing:

1. – Our Voice/The Flag
2. – The Line
3. – Pay Day
4. – Wide Awake
5. – Do Nothing
6. – Don't Wanna Be You
7. – Happy
8. – Hole
- Inginku Rejam Raksasa Kejam (10-inch Vinyl, FAMED Records 2012)

Track listing:

1. – Mata Buta
2. – Potong Nama, Tutup Buku
3. – Semua Sama, Semua Bosan
4. – Macam Celaka!
5. – Punk Gampang
6. – Hanturaya Putrajaya
7. – Aku, Buku & AUKU
8. – The Fine Line of Numb

=== EP ===
- Sheepfarming in Malaysia (7-inch Vinyl 2000)

Track listing:

1. – Our Voice/The Flag
2. – Wide Awake
3. – The Line
4. – Oppression
- Macam Celaka / Hanturaya Putrajaya (CDREP 2008)

=== Split ===
- 2 Docs & A Sister: Diminished Return / Carburetor Dung (Audio Cassette, Sound Action Records, 1995)
- MABUKKUASA: Millions of Dead Cops / Carburetor Dung / The Bollocks (CD, S.B.S/Jerk Off Records, 2011)

=== Compilations ===
- Delirium Tremens Tapes: D.T NR:28 (Audio Cassette 1994)
- Dari Jemapoh ke Manchestee (CD & Audio Cassette 1998)
- Smash Capitalism: We are Everywhere (CD 2003)
- Non-Conformity vol. 1 (CD 2004)
- The Dude Puked on My Lap: A Tribute to The Pilgrims a.k.a. Hijrah (CDR 2005)
- Radio Malaya (CD 2006)
- Radio Demokratika (CD 2011)
- Tales of the Insomniac Raksaksa (Audio Cassette 2014)
