= Split Works =

China-based music company

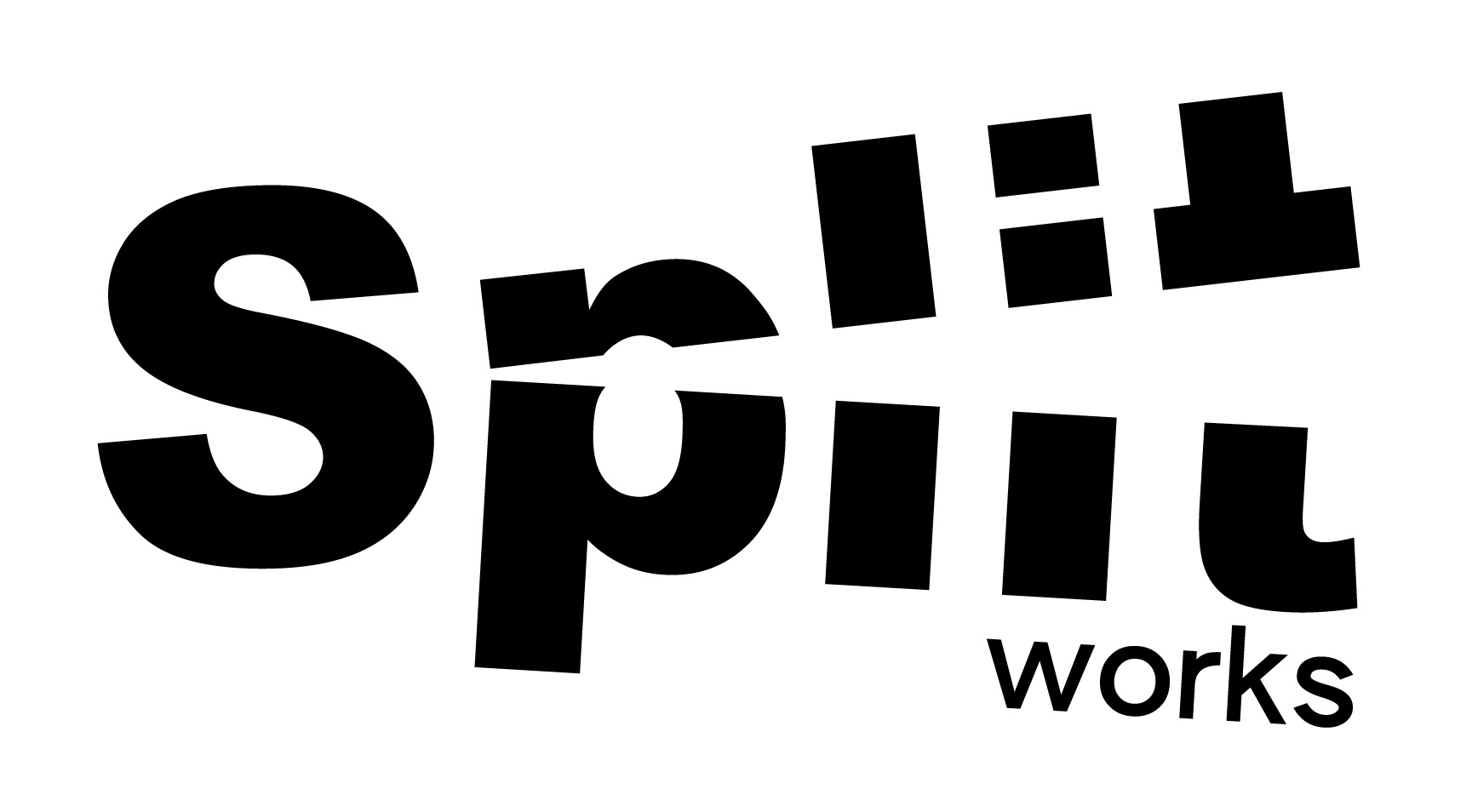
- Status: Active
- Founded: 2006
- Founder: Archie Hamilton, Nathaniel Davis
- Country of origin: China
- Headquarters location: Shanghai, Beijing
- Publication types: Wooozy, China Music Radar
- Official website: https://www.spli-t.com

Split Works is a China-based music company founded in 2006 by Archie Hamilton and Nathaniel Davis. It is a subsidiary of Split United, one of China's most influential music industry organizations, with offices in both Shanghai and Beijing. Split Works organizes the annual JUE | Music + Art Festival in Beijing and Shanghai, the Concrete & Grass Music Festival in Shanghai, and co-presents the "Contemporale" concert series with the Shanghai Symphony Orchestra.

== Organization ==
Split United comprises five subsidiaries:

- Split Works (Independent Music & Festival Promoter)
- Splatter (Music and Creative Consultancy)
- Scorched (Booking Agency, Asia)
- Wooozy (China's #1 Music Community)
- China Music Radar (Chinese Music Industry Resource)

And owns 4 festival brands:

- Echo Park (outdoor, mixed genre)
- JUE | Music + Art (multi-venue, avant-garde)
- Wood+Wires (indoor, folk/ world)
- Concrete & Grass (outdoor, mixed genre)

== Split Works ==
Split Works is the brainchild of Scot Archie Hamilton and American Nathaniel Davis. The company aims to create a more sustainable ecosystem for music in China.

Conceived at a time when live music options in China were extremely limited, Split Works is one of a few notable groups that have aided the growth of the live music industry in China and the wider Asia region, working with both Chinese and Western music artists across many genres. They've been named "Best Promoter" in both Shanghai and Beijing by City Weekend magazine (2013, 2014, and 2015). Split Works has organized concerts and tours for notable artists including: Sonic Youth, Faithless, Steve Aoki, Diplo, Owl City, Jason Mraz, Godspeed You! Black Emperor, Thirty Seconds to Mars, Ludacris, Grandmaster Flash, the Lumineers, Death Cab for Cutie, Gang of Four, Girl Talk, Talib Kweli, José González, Andrew Bird, Ghostface Killah, Dandi Wind, Grimes, St. Vincent, Gerard Way, Young Fathers, Everything Everything, Black Star, Julia Holter, MIKA, Perfume Genius, Pennywise and Olafur Arnalds.

Split Works was also responsible for several notable brand campaigns in the four years before its sister company, Splatter, was created.

== Splatter ==
Splatter was spun out of Split Works in 2010 to provide brands with an experienced consultancy for using music in China. Splatter works with many global companies known for their marketing practices. Splatter's (previously Split Works') Converse sponsored "Love Noise" campaign in 2009 was named by AdAge as the best campaign in China that year. Splatter has also received critical acclaim from market research firm Millward Brown, crediting the company for three of the top five branded music campaigns in China.

=== Converse Love Noise (2008–2009) ===
In association with the advertising agency Wieden + Kennedy, the Splatter team conceptualized, planned and produced the Converse Love Noise road trip: the first campaign in China of its kind. They designed and built China's first music focused tour bus and with the 2008 Olympics looming large, took two of the hottest Chinese indie bands (P.K.14 and Queen Sea Big Shark) on a journey that spawned the "Love Noise" documentary. It was selected as the No. 1 campaign in China in 2009 by trade publication Ad Age.

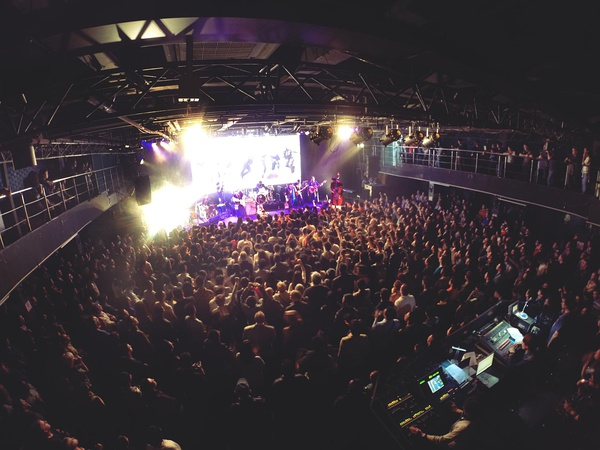
Chinese band Hanggai playing a Guinness-branded show at MAO Livehouse, Shanghai in 2014.

=== Guinness (2013–2014) ===
Splatter strategically aligned China's up and coming folk scene with the Guinness brand for the 2013-2014 Guinness "Made of More" Campaign. The campaign in China included a bespoke festival called Guinness Wood+Wires (健力士木+线音乐节). Supporting the festival were five smaller Guinness branded concerts inviting the best folk artists in China to perform including Hanggai, Ajinai, Hao Yun, and Su Yang. Social platforms and branded videos were used to engage its target audience on an even more interactive level. During the campaign from September 2013 to May 2014, over 6,000 individuals were reached at the festival and concerts, consuming more than 10,000 bottles of Guinness Original stout. According to a non-partial study researched at the Wood + Wires festival, music fans agreed there was a strong overall likeness between the brand and the festival. On the Guinness MORE weibo, there was a reach of over 2.5 million views.

=== adidas Unite All Originals (2013) ===
Splatter was selected as lead Chinese agency for adidas Originals' "Global Unite All Originals" campaign in 2013. This campaign dug deep into the world of original content, where international artists from various disciplines collide to create something truly unexpected and unique. Splatter developed and localized adidas' International concept for the China market by bringing China's most innovative multi disciplinary artists in music, visual and digital arts, fashion, dance and film together to curate a series of "collisions" over the summer in 2013.

=== Tuborg (2013-2014) ===
In 2013 Splatter collaborated with Carlsberg's Tuborg brand to launch the Tuborg Music Truck Tour. Over a five-month period, they organized 160 events across 51 developing cities, among the first events in China targeting emergent youth cultures beyond the 1st and 2nd tier cities. The campaign was extended to 2014, and featured more than 11 rising underground artists.

=== House of Vans Asia (2015) ===
Splatter curated the programming for the House of Vans Asia Tour. The tour included bands from diverse genres, including high-energy punk rock (Pennywise), contemporary hip-hop (Talib Kweli and Mobb Deep) and modern Chinese alternative (Nova Heart). The artists played three sold-out, well received shows in Beijing, Chengdu and Seoul.

=== Apple (2015-2017) ===
Splatter has executed more than 70 in-store events for Apple across China, handling the logistics and production for each event.

=== Topshop / Topman (2016) ===
Splatter executed an ambitious activation for global fashion brand Topshop / Topman at the 2016 Concrete & Grass Festival. It featured a sprawling style, fashion and art zone at the heart of the festival, with stylists, selfie booths, the latest collections, special offers, and a collaborative, evolving art installation.

=== Tuborg: Major Lazer x Chris Lee (2017) ===
Splatter teamed up with leading beer brand Tuborg to lead their 'Tuborg Open' initiative in China. They partnered Major Lazer with 李宇春 (a.k.a. Chris Lee) in one of the most high-profile creative collaborations between a Chinese pop star and an international dance music act.

== Scorched ==
Scorched is a talent booking agency that focuses on the greater Asia region established in 2009. Scorched has promoted and organized many 'firsts', taking Girl Talk into Vietnam in 2009 and the Handsome Furs to Myanmar to play the first ever shows by an international band off embassy soil in 2011. The agency has brought artists to tour throughout Asia, including Mac DeMarco, Olafur Arnalds, Thee Oh Sees, The Dodos, And So I Watch You From Afar, Shabazz Palaces, Bok Bok, Mumdance, Julia Holter, Untold (musician) and Lone.

== China Music Radar ==
China Music Radar (CMR) is a China music industry online resource maintained by Split United and includes a network of writers, musicians, and industry insiders operating in China. Its goal is to demystify China's music business by communicating to the local and international communities the latest news and realities on the ground. CMR hopes filling this vital information gap will help to cultivate China's emerging music scene, and offer exposure and opportunity to a new generation of musical talent. CMR's first post was on November 19, 2007 and is written in English for the benefit of the music industry outside of China.

== Wooozy ==
Launched in April 2009, Wooozy.cn is one of the first Chinese-language specialist web publications focusing on both underground and mainstream music in China and across the globe. Wooozy Radio is a monthly podcast featuring Chinese and international independent music. Wooozy is also a supporter of local talent, previously holding the "Wooozy Sessions" which was a series of events that invited Chinese bands outside of Shanghai to play in Shanghai, thus giving them a platform to showcase their talent. Bands like Skip Skip Ben Ben and Mr. Graceless played at previous Wooozy Sessions.

In April 2014, the community launched "Wooozy Offline" – a series of parties that bring some of the most important and relevant DJ's and producers from around the world to play with local Chinese DJs. International artists for the Wooozy Offline series include New York Transit Authority, Bok Bok, Nguzunguzu, The Field, Slackk, Lakker, DJ Nobu, Palmistry, Logos, and Untold.

== Festivals ==
Split Works owns and operates several independent events and festivals in China:

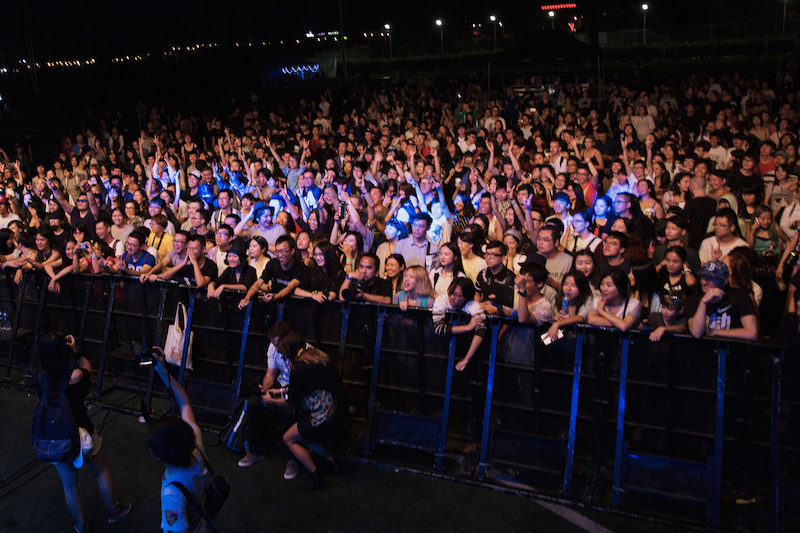
The view from the main stage, Echo Park 2015

=== Concrete & Grass ===
An annual outdoor music festival in Shanghai, previously known as 'Echo Park'. The festival featured 57 artists across four stages, and was headlined by Gerard Way, Kelis, Jay Park, Pennywise, Chase & Status and Black Star. The 2016 edition was headlined by Japanese band Sekai No Owari, rapper A$AP Ferg and Hong Kong actor Edison Chen.

The festival in 2017 was headlined by RADWIMPS, DIIV. Carsick Cars played their first album in full and for the first time in six years with the original lineup.

Concrete & Grass is coming up with Li Jian, Daddy Yankee, Slowdive, Togawa Jun and Zee Avi in 2018.

=== JUE | Music + Art Festival ===
JUE | Music + Art Festival began in 2009 and is an annual urban festival that takes place in Beijing and Shanghai concurrently. JUE aims to showcase the best of the local creative communities in both cities and invites artists from around the world to share their talent with China. Its ethos lies in supporting the community, resisting large and obvious branding, and curating music and arts events for everyone to enjoy. 2014 saw the celebration of JUE | Music + Art's sixth year in China and is one of the top three most recognized festivals in China.

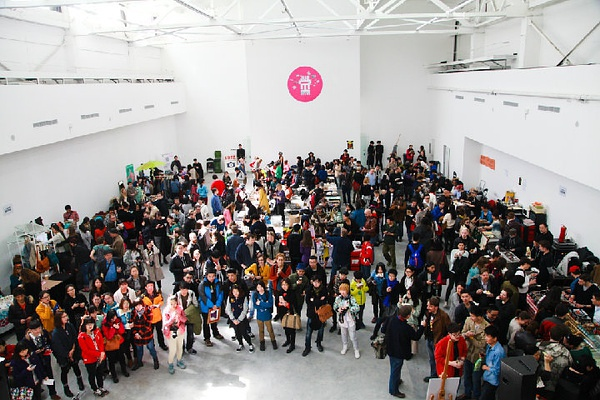
The "Creative Market" at JUE 2015.

=== Black Rabbit Music Festival ===
In 2011 Split Works worked with Taihe Live to produce the first ever Black Rabbit Music Festival Presented by OPPO Real in Beijing on September 17 and in Shanghai on September 18. At the time it was the largest international music festival China had seen. The festival had three stages in Beijing and four in Shanghai. The festival featured headline sets from Ludacris, Thirty Seconds to Mars, Hebe Tien (田馥甄 from S.H.E.) and Hanggai.

=== GUINNESS MORE Music: Wood+Wires Music Festival 2013 ===
As part of the GUINNESS MORE Music concert series, a three-day festival was curated by Splatter and promoted and organized by Split Works. Wood + Wires took place from November 1–3 at Shanghai's QianShuiWan Center with thousands of fans attending. With a lineup of both Chinese and international independent musicians, the 2013 edition featured Chinese Idol runner up Yunggiema, World's End Girlfriend, and Sainkho Namtchylak, the world's most renowned female khoomei singer.

=== Yue Festival ===
On October 5, 2007, Split Works created the YUE Festival, an outdoor music festival held in Zhongshan Park in Shanghai, China. Performers included Faithless, Talib Kweli, Ozomatli, Yacht, Banana Monkey, SuperVC, Hedgehog, and IZ. It was the first festival in downtown Shanghai supported by the Changning government and at the time, boasted the strongest international line-up Shanghai had ever seen at a music festival. Partners and sponsors included Bacardi, Converse and Neocha.com.
