= Woh Jahan =

Sins Remain

Studio album by Black Hour
- Released: 19 February 2021
- Recorded: 2019–2020 at Fahad Humayun Studios in Islamabad, Pakistan
- Genres: Progressive rock, alternative rock
- Length: 24:00
- Label: Rearts Records
- Producer: Fahad Humayun Chohan

Black Hour chronology
Sins Remain (2021)	Sins Remain (2021)

Singles from Black Hour
- 1. "Aik Nayi Subh" Released: 2019; 2. "Husn-e-Haqiqi" Released: 2020

Woh Jahan is the third studio album by Pakistani progressive rock band Black Hour, released on 19 February 2021 by Rearts Records globally. The recording sessions occurred at the SnakeHook Studios in Islamabad, Pakistan with production by Black Hour alongside Fahad Humayun Chohan. The album is the first Urdu language album by the band.

== Background ==
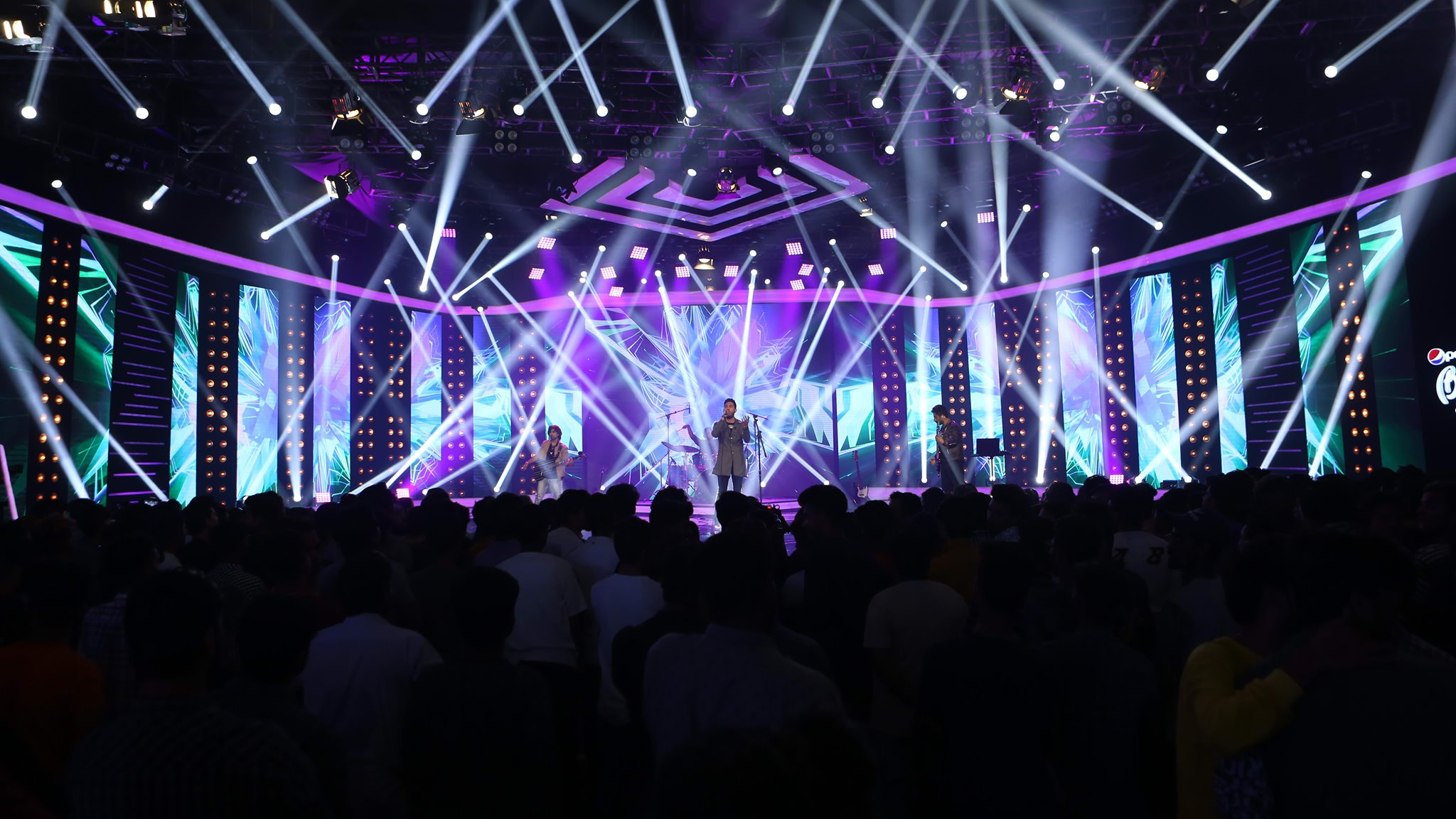
Black Hour performing a rendition of Alamgir Haq's "Tum Hi Se Aye Mujahido" live at Pepsi Battle of the Bands fourth season.

Black Hour shifted their musical lyrics from English to Urdu in 2019 and appeared on Pepsi Battle of the Bands fourth season with the performance of their Potwari language single "Daulat". The performance and the song was lauded by Bilal Maqsood, one of the judges at the television series, with The Express Tribune reporting, "Bilal Maqsood aptly pointed out how the rawness and loudness of the language suited their music well and wouldn’t have worked so effortlessly in Urdu", while Daily Times said, "the organic quality and clarity of direction and purpose pushed the band to the next round."

On July 19, the band performed their second single titled "Aik Nayi Subh", originally a literary piece by Ibn-e-Insha, on the fourth episode of the television series and got positive feedback from judging panel, which included, Fawad Khan, Meesha Shafi and Strings and allowed the band to qualify for the top eight bands round. Something Haute said, "the song, as corroborated by Meesha, had a very concert sound and the lead vocalist powerful vocals supported it thoroughly" and MangoBaaz cited that "due to Black Hour’s range and overall cohesion, the judges chose them to go to the next round." On July 26, in the next round of Pepsi Battle of the Bands, Black Hour performed a rendition of "Tum Hi Se Aye Mujahido" by Alamgir Haq and went into the top four bands round alongside Auj, Aarish and E Sharp. MangoBaaz reported that the cover song "rendition was goosebump-inducing and hit all the right notes" and Maheen Sabeeh, music critic, from The News International giving a critical review wrote, "Black Hour just couldn’t decide if they aim to entertain or carry their chosen genre forward full scale." In their final appearance at the show, Maheen Sabeeh from The News International said, "Black Hour went with an original called "Tanhaiyaan" with "Tanhai" by Fringe Benefits and showcased strong musicianship, picked good songs to mash", which received mix reviews from the panel judges, with Faisal Kapadia saying the performance was a “rollercoaster” ride.

After the band's exit from Pepsi Battle of the Bands fourth season, Black Hour went on to releasing a live album Live: Volume I of their performances at the television series and went on tour performing on various festivals and concerts, most notably at the Lahore Auto Show 2019 in November and at the Pepsi Battle of the Band's Tour with Mekaal Hasan Band in December 2019. On December 15, Black Hour released a studio version of their single "Aik Nayi Subh" with a music video. Bolojawan named and listed "Aik Nayi Subh" by Black Hour as part of the list 10 Pakistani Music Moments Of 2019, saying the song "stood out" amongst others in Pepsi Battle of Bands.

On September 22, 2020, Black Hour released a visualiser of their single "Husn-e-Haqiqi", a Sufi kafi written by Khwaja Ghulam Farid, from their upcoming third studio album. In an interview with Unite Asia, the band confirmed they re-released a remastered version of their debut album Age of War (2011) via Rearts and are set to release their third studio album Woh Jahan in February 2021. Hashim Mehmood, while talking about the band's upcoming third studio release, added that “the next album is a mix of rock n’ roll, progressive tones, and heavy riffs which are both inspired from Eastern and Western melodies and the album will entirely be in Urdu, being our first Urdu language studio album and third overall album as part of our discography”.

On February 14, Maheen Sabeeh from The News International reported, Black Hour is releasing their third album which is “scheduled for release on February 19th, the album comprises seven tracks in total with two music videos, "Aik Nayi Subh" and "Husn-e-Haqiqi", having released in the previous year”.

== Reception ==
On February 19, Maíra Watanabe from WikiMetal said, “the new Black Hour work brings a range of emotions, versatility and portraits, a new structure for the South Asian progressive rock music scene”. On February 20, Unite Asia, praised the album saying "the shift starts off with a massive nod to the 80’s of hard rock with HUGE earth-shattering vocals. Goddamn the dude can sing. This record is clearly way outside of our world of hardcore and punk rock – but good music done properly with heart and soul deserves support regardless." Tayyab Khalil from Rockistan reviewed the album, saying “Woh Jahan is an avalanche of great rock tracks and definitely worth checking out”.

== Track listing ==
All lyrics are written by Tayyab Rehman; all music is composed by Black Hour except where noted.

No.	Title	Writer(s)	Length
1.	"Heer Di Jaan"	Salman Afzal	2:58
2.	"Aik Nayi Subh"	Ibn-e-Insha	3:12
3.	"Woh Jahan"	Kaifi Azmi	3:54
4.	"Husn-e-Haqiqi"	Khawaja Ghulam Farid	2:50
5.	"Meray Khwaab"		4:22
6.	"Yeh Aag"		3:08
7.	"Laut Ja"		3:47

== Personnel ==
Credits for Woh Jahan.

Black Hour

- Tayyab Rehman – lead vocals
- Hashim Mehmood – guitars, backing vocals
- Daim Mehmood – drums, percussion
- Salman Afzal – bass

Production

- Produced by Black Hour and Fahad Humayun Chohan
- Recorded and Mixed at Fahad Humayun Chohan in Islamabad, Pakistan
