= Andy Chung =

Andy Chung may refer to:

- Andy Chung, former member of the band, King Ly Chee
- Andy Chung, fictional character in The Last Ship (TV series)
