= Sins Remain =

Studio album by Black Hour
- Released: 5 January 2016
- Recorded: 2013–2016 at 11/8 Studios in Islamabad, Pakistan
- Genres: Heavy metal, Progressive rock
- Length: 43:00
- Labels: Transcending Obscurity; Rearts Records
- Producer: Fahad Humayun Chohan

Black Hour chronology
Age of War (2011)	Sins Remain (2016)	Woh Jahan (2021)

Singles from Black Hour
- 1. "Battle Cry" Released: 2015; 2. "Wind of Change" Released: 2015; 3. "Salvation (Radio Edit)" Released: 2014

Sins Remain is the second studio album by Pakistani progressive rock band Black Hour, released on 5 January 2016 in the United States and Europe by Transcending Obscurity, and reissued in 2020 by Rearts Records globally. The recording sessions occurred at the SnakeHook Studios in Islamabad, Pakistan with production by Black Hour alongside Fahad Humayun Chohan. It was also the last Black Hour release with guitarist Mubbashir Sheikh.

== Background ==
In 2015, Black Hour signed with Transcending Obscurity, an Indian record label, for the release of their second studio album titled Sins Remain. In July, the band went on to release their first single "Wind of Change" from their upcoming second studio album, with Unite Asia referring the band as the Iron Maiden of Pakistan and praised the song saying, "the vocal chops on the song "Wind of Change" and get ready to be pleasantly surprised by how the band fully wears their influences on their sleeves even up to the recording/production of the song." On August 27, the band collaborated and performed with former Guns N' Roses lead guitarist, Ron "Bumblefoot" Thal at Lok Virsa Open Air Theater during his tour to Pakistan. On November 23, the group went on to perform a theatrical album launch show at the Lok Virsa Open Air Theater in Islamabad, Pakistan. The band while in conversation with Youlin Magazine regarding the album, said "music has never been a means of pleasing the audience; rather, it serves as an outlet to express ourselves, which is why we chose to stick to the genre of heavy metal, and furthered our musical expression through English lyrical content." Hashim Mehmood, in an interview to Trendcrusher said the album "was a challenge for the band. With Age of War, it was just me, Tayyab and Hasan Rauf (ex-member) who were involved in the writing process so it was easy to carry. But with this one we decided that each member should bring about their creative process into the songwriting and thus, each song is so much different from the other that you get to hear the versatility of each member."

== Musical style and lyrical themes ==
"Sins Remain"
"Sins Remain" from Black Hour's album of the same title Sins Remain (2016). This clip features the band's musical influence of heavy metal and progressive rock sound.

Lisa Fingerhut, from MetalInside, has compared the band's music with Iron Maiden and Alice in Chains, saying "Black Hour are tonally somewhere between Iron Maiden and Alice in Chains, which, especially in combination with many influences from other genres, makes them interesting for the average European metal musician." Black Hour's distinct sound mixes heavy metal with alternative rock. Aaron Yurkiewicz from Metal Rules refers that Black Hour's sound take "cues from both classic and more modern trappings". In his review of Black Hour's 2016 album Sins Remain, FFM-Rock's Michael Toscher wrote, "Straightforward melodies, neatly played, cross-eyed grooveriffs and twin guitar harmonies, as well as a powerfully expressive vocal pattern of their fronter who bridges the gap between robust, hard voice phrasing, heroic stretched parts and soft timbre". Matt Bacon of Two Guys Metal Reviews stated, "Blackhour understand the fundamental topres of the metal world and are pushing it forward in a country that desperately needs it".

== Reception ==
On 5 January 2016, the band released Sins Remain and received critical acclaim from multiple metal forums and magazines. Wonderbox Metal, while reviewing the album, praised the band and the album, saying, "this is an album that embraces what True Heavy Metal is all about; attitude, passion, songcraft and pure, molten delivery." Aaron Yurkiewicz from Metal Rules wrote, "refreshing to hear a new band that’s non-committal to any particular metal sub-genre and that just totally embraces the whole family with passion and enthusiasm. Such is the case with Islamabad’s Black Hour and their sophomore release Sins Remain" and Metal Odyssey wrote, "the band forges a sound that is bound to hold appeal to any metal fan, old or new". Metal Underground Austria gave a critical review and rated the album 3/5, while the album was applauded by critics at the Metal Zone Magazine from Greece. Dave Hodges, critic and writer, from The Metal Observer reviewed Sins Remain and said, "Black Hour have put together a decent set of tunes here" and gave a rating of 7/10 overall, while Glacially Musical gave a positive review that Black Hour "extensive ability to create sound and melody, their solos soar well past melodic, into epic." In August, Metal Temple reviewed the album, saying "Sins Remain is actually a record that is worth checking out for everybody" and Kyle McGinn from Dead Rhetoric stated, that the album is "a solid sophomore attempt" by the band, while MetalSucks said, "Sins Remain holds its own as “non-annoying radio metal,” with classic twists of course."

== Track listing ==
All lyrics are written by Tayyab Rehman; all music is composed by Black Hour except where noted.

No.	Title	Length
1.	"Prelude" (Instrumental)	1:30
2.	"Losing Life"	6:54
3.	"Wind of Change"	5:33
4.	"Life Brings Death, Love Brings Misery"	9:01
5.	"Battle Cry"	5:18
6.	"Sins Remain"	8:23
7.	"Salvation (Radio Edit)"	5:59

== Personnel ==
Credits for Sins Remain.

Black Hour

- Tayyab Rehman – lead vocals
- Hashim Mehmood – guitars, backing vocals
- Mubbashir Sheikh - guitars
- Daim Mehmood – drums, percussion
- Salman Afzal – bass

Production

- Produced by Black Hour and Fahad Humayun Chohan
- Recorded and Mixed at SnakeHook Studios in Islamabad, Pakistan
