= Black Hour =

Pakistani heavy metal band

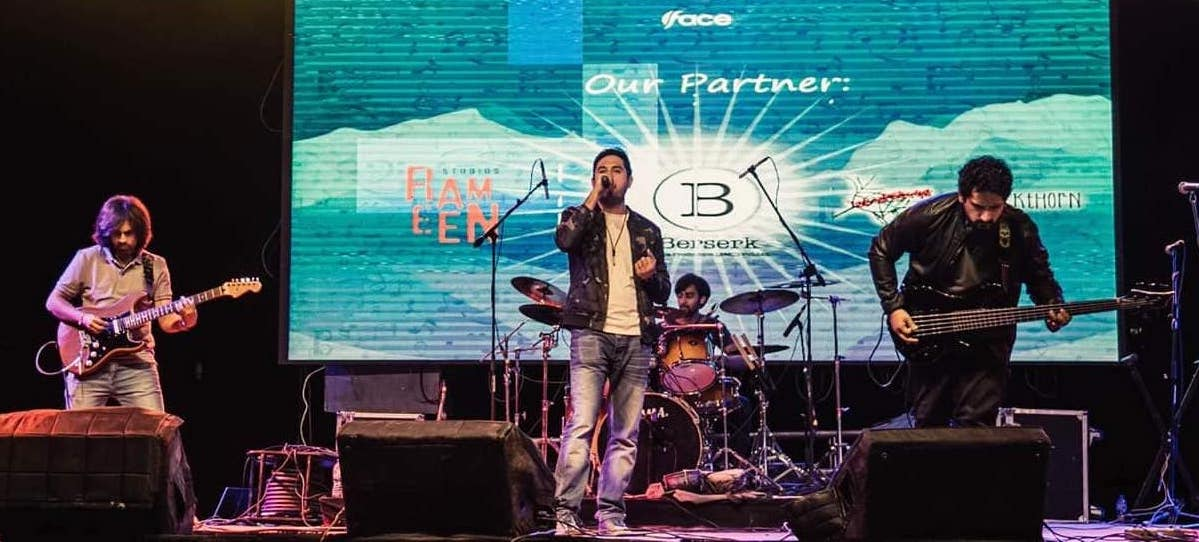
- Black Hour performing live at Face Mela 2019, Pakistan (L–R): Hashim Mehmood, Tayyab Rehman, Daim Mehmood, & Salman Afzal

Background information
- Origin: Islamabad, Pakistan
- Genres: Heavy metal, progressive rock, alternative rock
- Years active: 2007–present
- Label: Rearts Records
- Members: Tayyab Rehman; Salman Afzal; Hashim Mehmood; Daim Mehmood
- Past members: Hasan Rauf; Saad Javed; Mubbashir Sheikh

Black Hour, often stylized as Blackhour, (Urdu: بلیک آور) is a Pakistani progressive rock band from Islamabad, founded in 2007 by guitarist Hashim Mehmood. After several lineup changes in its early years, the band settled on four members for more than a decade: Hashim Mehmood, drummer Daim Mehmood, bassist Salman Afzal and lead vocalist Tayyab Rehman. Black Hour has consistently incorporated progressive, folk, classical, and alternative influences into its compositions, as well as strong influences from heavy metal, especially in their early works.

Black Hour has released two studio albums and one live album. The band released its debut album Age of War in 2011, which garnered them critical success and began to create a cult following for the band outside of Pakistan. In 2016, Black Hour released their best selling album Sins Remain, which received accolades from around the globe, with Aaron Yurkiewicz from Metal Rules rating the album 4/5 and Rock Hard giving positive reviews, comparing the band's music with Iron Maiden. The band came into the highlight when they went on Pepsi Battle of the Bands and shifted their musical lyrics from English to Urdu in 2019 and released their third studio album, Woh Jahan (Another Universe) in February 2021.

== History ==
=== Formation and early years (2007–2009) ===
Black Hour was formed as a heavy metal band in 2007 in Islamabad, Pakistan, by lead guitarist Hashim Mehmood. In 2007, Hashim asked his college friends, Hasan Rauf and Saad Javed to join Black Hour on guitars and bass alongside his brother Daim Mehmood to be the drummer of the band. After several line-up changes, in 2008, the band recruited Tayyab Rehman on vocals and in an interview with Metalhead Spotted, confirmed, "Tayyab suddenly clicked with the band" after meeting the lead guitarist, Hashim Mehmood. This prompted the band to perform in the local metal scene and gaining recognition in Pakistan. Soon after in 2009, Hasan Rauf left the band and was replaced by Mubbashir Sheikh on guitars.

=== Age of War (2010–2014) ===
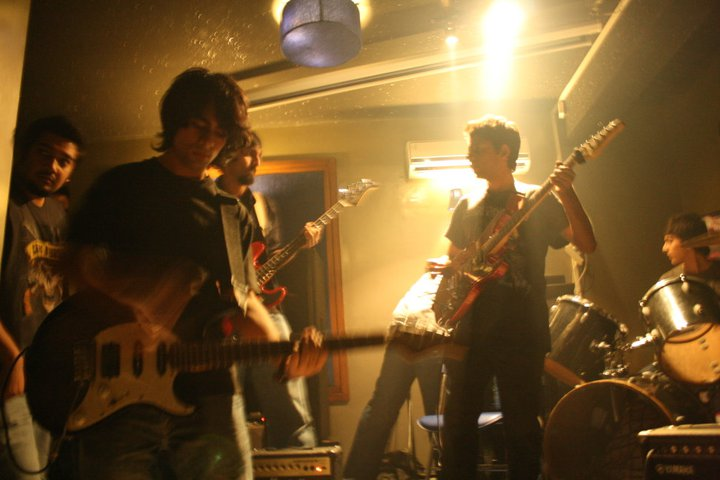
Black Hour while performing live at the Eclipse in 2011.

With Rehman as the vocalist and Sheikh on guitars, Black Hour went on to perform and participate at various underground musical competitions and after three successive wins at the Underground Battle of the Bands in Pakistan and getting acclaim for their singles, "Age of War" and "Salvation", the band decided to work on their debut album in the mid of 2010. During an interview with Metalindia Magazine, "it wasn't until 2009 that Black Hour became what it is today. And although it's a cliché but the journey hasn't been very smooth for Blackhour, but then again our fans, friends and family have always been there to help us through some really tough times, and we wouldn't be where we are today if it weren't for each and every one of them", Rehman said on Age of War, the debut album by the band.

Black Hour recorded its debut album, Age of War, at 11/8 Studios in Islamabad, Pakistan in 2010. However, the album was not released until October 25, 2011, via Yourlabel Records in the United States of America and by Afterwind Records in Pakistan. The album sold over 10,000 copies worldwide and helped the band gain success both locally and internationally. Soon after a few live shows in Pakistan, Black Hour returned to the studio to begin work on a second album and went on to perform on the World Music Day with their new single titled "Winds of Change" and "Battle Cry" from their upcoming second album in June 2013.

=== Sins Remain (2015–2018) ===
In 2015, Black Hour signed with Transcending Obscurity, an Indian record label, for the release of their second studio album titled Sins Remain. In July, the band went on to release their first single "Wind of Change" from their upcoming second studio album, with Unite Asia referring the band as the Iron Maiden of Pakistan and praised the song saying, "the vocal chops on the song "Wind of Change" and get ready to be pleasantly surprised by how the band fully wears their influences on their sleeves even up to the recording/production of the song." On August 27, the band collaborated and performed with former Guns N' Roses lead guitarist, Ron "Bumblefoot" Thal at Lok Virsa Open Air Theater during his tour to Pakistan. On November 23, the group went on to perform a theatrical album launch show at the Lok Virsa Open Air Theater in Islamabad, Pakistan. The band while in conversation with Youlin Magazine regarding the album, said "music has never been a means of pleasing the audience; rather, it serves as an outlet to express ourselves, which is why we chose to stick to the genre of heavy metal, and furthered our musical expression through English lyrical content." Hashim Mehmood, in an interview to Trendcrusher said the album "was a challenge for the band. With Age of War, it was just me, Tayyab and Hasan Rauf (ex-member) who were involved in the writing process so it was easy to carry. But with this one we decided that each member should bring about their creative process into the songwriting and thus, each song is so much different from the other that you get to hear the versatility of each member."

On 5 January 2016, the band released Sins Remain and received critical acclaim from multiple metal forums and magazines. Wonderbox Metal, while reviewing the album, praised the band and the album, saying, "this is an album that embraces what True Heavy Metal is all about; attitude, passion, songcraft and pure, molten delivery." Aaron Yurkiewicz from Metal Rules wrote, "refreshing to hear a new band that’s non-committal to any particular metal sub-genre and that just totally embraces the whole family with passion and enthusiasm. Such is the case with Islamabad’s Black Hour and their sophomore release Sins Remain" and Metal Odyssey wrote, "the band forges a sound that is bound to hold appeal to any metal fan, old or new". Metal Underground Austria gave a critical review and rated the album 3/5, while the album was applauded by critics at the Metal Zone Magazine from Greece. Dave Hodges, critic and writer, from The Metal Observer reviewed Sins Remain and said, "Black Hour have put together a decent set of tunes here" and gave a rating of 7/10 overall, while Glacially Musical gave a positive review that Black Hour "extensive ability to create sound and melody, their solos soar well past melodic, into epic." In August, Metal Temple reviewed the album, saying "Sins Remain is actually a record that is worth checking out for everybody" and Kyle McGinn from Dead Rhetoric stated, that the album is "a solid sophomore attempt" by the band, while MetalSucks said, "Sins Remain holds its own as "non-annoying radio metal," with classic twists of course."

On May 7, 2017, lead guitarist Hashim Mehmood went on to release his debut solo instrumental album titled Mood Swings. On September 22, Black Hour appeared on the documentary The Magic Begins featuring the band's performance at Echo Rock Fest 2016 in Islamabad.

=== Pepsi Battle of the Bands and Live: Volume I (2019) ===
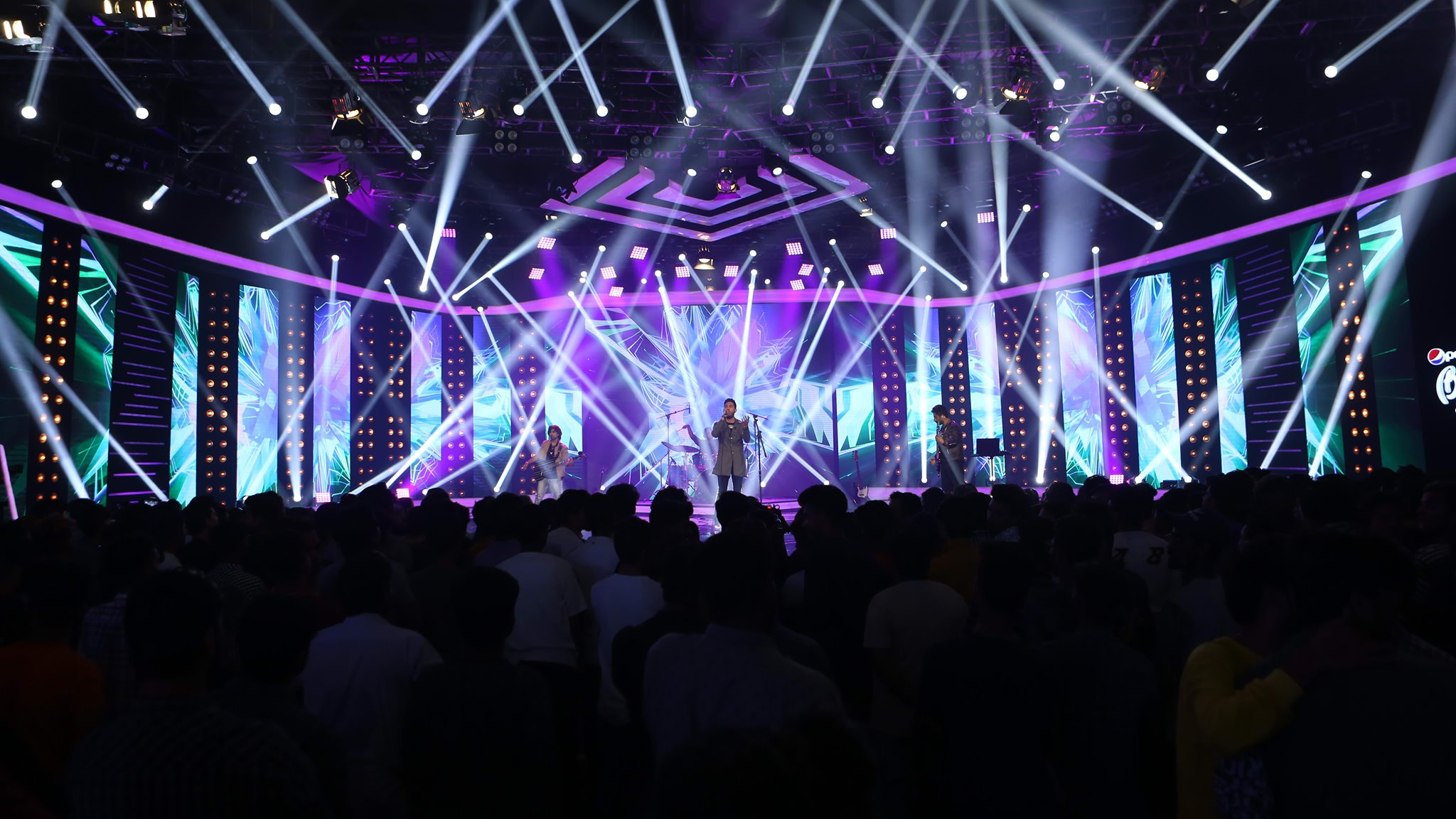
Black Hour performing a rendition of Alamgir Haq's "Tum Hi Se Aye Mujahido" live at Pepsi Battle of the Bands fourth season.

Black Hour shifted their musical lyrics from English to Urdu in 2019 and appeared on Pepsi Battle of the Bands fourth season with the performance of their Potwari language single "Daulat". The performance and the song was lauded by Bilal Maqsood, one of the judges at the television series, with The Express Tribune reporting, "Bilal Maqsood aptly pointed out how the rawness and loudness of the language suited their music well and wouldn’t have worked so effortlessly in Urdu", while Daily Times said, "the organic quality and clarity of direction and purpose pushed the band to the next round."

On July 19, the band performed their second single titled "Aik Nayi Subh", originally a literary piece by Ibn-e-Insha, on the fourth episode of the television series and got positive feedback from judging panel, which included, Fawad Khan, Meesha Shafi and Strings and allowed the band to qualify for the top eight bands round. Something Haute said, "the song, as corroborated by Meesha, had a very concert sound and the lead vocalist powerful vocals supported it thoroughly" and MangoBaaz cited that "due to Black Hour’s range and overall cohesion, the judges chose them to go to the next round." On July 26, in the next round of Pepsi Battle of the Bands, Black Hour performed a rendition of "Tum Hi Se Aye Mujahido" by Alamgir Haq and went into the top four bands round alongside Auj, Aarish and E Sharp. MangoBaaz reported that the cover song "rendition was goosebump-inducing and hit all the right notes" and Maheen Sabeeh, music critic, from The News International giving a critical review wrote, "Black Hour just couldn’t decide if they aim to entertain or carry their chosen genre forward full scale." In their final appearance at the show, Maheen Sabeeh from The News International said, "Black Hour went with an original called "Tanhaiyaan" with "Tanhai" by Fringe Benefits and showcased strong musicianship, picked good songs to mash", which received mix reviews from the panel judges, with Faisal Kapadia saying the performance was a “rollercoaster” ride.

After the band's exit from Pepsi Battle of the Bands fourth season, Black Hour went on to releasing a live album Live: Volume I of their performances at the television series and went on tour performing on various festivals and concerts, most notably at the Lahore Auto Show 2019 in November and at the Pepsi Battle of the Band's Tour with Mekaal Hasan Band in December 2019. On December 15, Black Hour released a studio version of their single "Aik Nayi Subh" with a music video. Bolojawan named and listed "Aik Nayi Subh" by Black Hour as part of the list 10 Pakistani Music Moments Of 2019, saying the song "stood out" amongst others in Pepsi Battle of Bands.

=== Woh Jahan (2020–present) ===
On September 22, 2020, Black Hour released a visualiser of their single "Husn-e-Haqiqi", a Sufi kafi written by Khwaja Ghulam Farid, from their upcoming third studio album. In an interview with Unite Asia, the band confirmed they re-released a remastered version of their debut album Age of War (2011) via Rearts and are set to release their third studio album Woh Jahan in February 2021. Hashim Mehmood, while talking about the band's upcoming third studio release, added that “the next album is a mix of rock n’ roll, progressive tones, and heavy riffs which are both inspired from Eastern and Western melodies and the album will entirely be in Urdu, being our first Urdu language studio album and third overall album as part of our discography”.

On February 14, Maheen Sabeeh from The News International reported, Black Hour is releasing their third album which is “scheduled for release on February 19th, the album comprises seven tracks in total with two music videos, "Aik Nayi Subh" and "Husn-e-Haqiqi", having released in the previous year”. On February 19, Maíra Watanabe from WikiMetal said, “the new Black Hour work brings a range of emotions, versatility and portraits, a new structure for the South Asian progressive rock music scene”. On February 20, Unite Asia, praised the album saying "the shift starts off with a massive nod to the 80’s of hard rock with HUGE earth-shattering vocals. Goddamn the dude can sing. This record is clearly way outside of our world of hardcore and punk rock – but good music done properly with heart and soul deserves support regardless." Tayyab Khalil from Rockistan reviewed the album, saying “Woh Jahan is an avalanche of great rock tracks and definitely worth checking out”.

== Musical style and influences ==
"Sins Remain"
"Sins Remain" from Black Hour's album of the same title Sins Remain (2016). This clip features the band's musical influence of heavy metal and progressive rock sound.

"Aik Nayi Subh"
"Aik Nayi Subh" from Black Hour's album of the same title Woh Jahan (2021). The single is a poetry by famous Urdu poet Ibn-e-Insha. The single was a massive hit after the band changed their sound and lyrics from English to Urdu.

As Black Hour's primary songwriter and lyricist, vocalist/guitarist Tayyab Rehman alongside lead guitarist Hashim Mehmood heads the direction of Black Hour's sound. Both Rehman and Mehmood were influenced at a young age by the 1980s progressive rock bands Guns N' Roses, Metallica and Porcupine Tree, and heavy metal such as Iron Maiden, Alice in Chains, Judas Priest and Black Sabbath.

Lisa Fingerhut, from MetalInside, has compared the band's music with Iron Maiden and Alice in Chains, saying "Black Hour are tonally somewhere between Iron Maiden and Alice in Chains, which, especially in combination with many influences from other genres, makes them interesting for the average European metal musician." Black Hour's distinct sound mixes heavy metal with alternative rock. Aaron Yurkiewicz from Metal Rules refers that Black Hour's sound take "cues from both classic and more modern trappings". In his review of Black Hour's 2016 album Sins Remain, FFM-Rock's Michael Toscher wrote, "Straightforward melodies, neatly played, cross-eyed grooveriffs and twin guitar harmonies, as well as a powerfully expressive vocal pattern of their fronter who bridges the gap between robust, hard voice phrasing, heroic stretched parts and soft timbre". Matt Bacon of Two Guys Metal Reviews stated, "Blackhour understand the fundamental topres of the metal world and are pushing it forward in a country that desperately needs it". Hashim Mehmood commented on the sound of Black Hour's music, while talking to WikiMetal:

The thing is that Maiden has really inspired me, and the way they produce their melodious tracks, and the way that their heavy metal is, in a way, very melodic, so we kind of try to put that in Blackhour as well, we want that, we want to make our songs very melodic, and we want songs that really touch the hearts of people, that they can head bang to, or jump, or whatever they feel like doing. So mainly, for me, it’s this inspiration, I try to put that in my songs, in our songs.

More recently, Black Hour have abandoned their heavy metal sound resulting in a mellower progressive/alternative rock sound and have moved their lyrics from English to Urdu language. Areeba Mukhtiar, from Runaway Pakistan, referred the band with their new sound as "a unit with a diverse set of music and abilities". When talking about Woh Jahan (2021) to Unite Asia, guitarist Hashim Mehmood stated, "a mix of rock n’ roll, progressive tones, and heavy riffs which are both inspired from Eastern and Western melodies and the album will entirely be in Urdu, being our first Urdu language studio album and third overall album as part of our discography."

== Discography ==
- Age of War (2011)
- Sins Remain (2016)
- Woh Jahan (2021)

== Band members ==
Current members

- Tayyab Rehman – lead vocals (2009–present)
- Daim Mehmood – drums (2007–present)
- Hashim Mehmood – lead guitar, backing vocals (2007–present)
- Salman Afzal – bass (2007–present)

Former members

- Hasan Rauf – rhythm guitar (2007–2009)
- Saad Javed – bass, backing vocals (2007–2009)
- Mubbashir Sheikh – rhythm guitar, lead guitar (2009–2017)

== See also ==
- Pepsi Battle of the Bands
- Pakistani rock
