= Paper Houses =

Paper Houses may refer to:

- Paper Houses, album by The Bollands
- "Paper Houses", song by Mull Historical Society from Loss (Mull Historical Society album)
- "Paper Houses", song by Bert Jansch from Toy Balloon (album)
- "Paper Houses", song by Niall Horan from Flicker (album)
- Paper House, a structure in Rockport, Massachusetts
