= Dear Eloise =

Dear Eloise may refer to:

- "Dear Eloise", a song by the Hollies from their 1967 album Butterfly
- Dear Eloise (band), a Chinese rock band
