= We Are Who We Are (disambiguation) =

We Are Who We Are is a 2020 HBO/Sky miniseries.

We Are Who We Are may also refer to:

- "We R Who We R", a 2010 song by Kesha
- We Are Who We Are, a 2000 album by King Ly Chee
- "We Are Who We Are", a 2012 song by Little Mix from DNA
