= Music of Sichuan =

Sichuan is a province of China which has a long history of both folk and classical music. Sichuan opera is an ancient tradition that is well-known across China, while the folk-based Sichuan lantern drama is popular in the region. The Sichuan Conservatory of Music in Chengdu is one of the older establishments of musical education in China, having been established in 1939. It is the only such institution in southwest China.

There is deeply religious music in Sichuan, played by Daoist priests in their temples. Married lay priests have their own kinds of music, performed at various rituals.

Folk ensembles may include instruments like the bamboo flute, pan and cymbals, gong and horn.

One more recently famous Sichuan group is the Higher Brothers.

The band Hiperson, which comes from the region, blends traditional music from the region with modern rock genres such as post-punk and post-rock.
