= Chengdu Academy of Fine Arts =

Art school in Chengdu, China

- 成都美术学院
- Formation: 2000
- Founder: Ma Yiping (马一平)
- Founded at: Chengdu, Sichuan, China
- Headquarters: Sichuan Conservatory of Music Xindu Campus, 620 Shulong Avenue, Xindu District, Chengdu 610500
- Location: Chengdu, China
- Coordinates: 30.63950°N 104.07858°E
- Origins: Sichuan Fine Arts Institute
- Region served: Sichuan
- Services: Art education
- Official language: Chinese
- President: Ma Yiping (马一平)
- Affiliations: Sichuan Conservatory of Music
- Website: my.sccm.cn

The Chengdu Academy of Fine Arts (Chinese: 成都美术学院) is an art school, based in the Xindu District of Chengdu, Sichuan, China.

The academy is associated with the Sichuan Conservatory of Music and has its facilities located at the Xindu Campus. It offers bachelor's degrees and master's degrees.

== Foundation ==
The Sichuan Fine Arts Institute (SCFAI) is located in Chongqing, but since 1997, Chongqing has been separate from the Sichuan province, and there was not an equivalent institute in Chengdu. One of the vice presidents of Sichuan Fine Arts Institute, Ma Yiping (马一平), organized some teachers from SCFAI to move to Chengdu and created the Chengdu Academy of Fine Arts in 2000, which is formally a school that belongs to the Sichuan Conservatory of Music.

== See also ==
- Chengdu Art Academy
- Sichuan Conservatory of Music, Chengdu
- Sichuan Fine Arts Institute, Chongqing
