= Michael Pettis =

American economist

- Born: 16 June 1958 (age 68); Zaragoza, Spain
- Occupation: Economist

Academic background
- Education: Columbia University

Academic work
- Main interests: World Economy, Trade, China
- Notable works: The Great Rebalancing; Trade Wars Are Class Wars
- Website: www.financialsense.com/blogs/1553/michael-pettiss-blog

Michael Pettis (born 16 June 1958) is an American economist and a nonresident senior fellow at the Carnegie Endowment for International Peace.

== Early life and education ==
Pettis was born in Zaragoza, Spain to a French mother and an American father, who was a geologist and civil engineer. He spent his childhood in Peru, Pakistan, Morocco, and Haiti before returning to Spain for high school. He entered Columbia University in 1976 and earned a Master of International Affairs in Economic Development in 1981, followed by an MBA in Finance in 1984.

== Career ==
Pettis began his career in 1987 at Manufacturers Hanover (now JPMorgan Chase) in the Sovereign Debt group, where he specialized in Latin American debt restructuring and sovereign finance. From 1996 to 2001, he served as a managing director at Bear Stearns, focusing on Latin American capital markets and international finance.

In 2002, Pettis moved to China to teach graduate-level finance. He taught at the School of Economics and Management at Tsinghua University from 2002 to 2004 and later taught at Guanghua School of Management at Peking University.

From 2006 to 2012, he founded and co-owned the live music venue D22 and established a record label Maybe Mars.

Pettis is currently a nonresident senior fellow at the Carnegie Endowment for International Peace.

== Writings ==
He has published books on global economic growth, including The Great Rebalancing: Trade, Conflict, and the Perilous Road Ahead for the World Economy (2013).

=== Predicted low growth in China ===
Michael Pettis predicted in 2011 that Chinese GDP growth would slow sharply to around 3% well before the end of the decade, with the slowdown beginning as early as 2013–2014. However, actual growth rates remained higher than his projections, with China's economy continuing to expand above 3% through the 2010s and into the 2020s.

In a 2012 article for the Brookings-Tsinghua Public Policy Center, Arthur R. Kroeber criticized Pettis's low-growth predictions, arguing that China still had significant potential for growth through capital investment, labor mobilization, and urbanization.

=== Chinese economic investment ===
Pettis has long warned that heavy investment by China into infrastructure projects, at the expense of consumption, is cause for serious concern. The banking sector in particular, the source of cheap loans for large infrastructure projects, has accumulated large debts both on and off balance sheet. There are only two methods by which investment, which is estimated at almost 50% of China's GDP, would decline to a level more consistent with other Asian economies. China can either deliberately de-incentivize investment spending, at the near-term cost of slowing economic growth, or investment can continue to rise as a share of GDP until the financial system cannot absorb further increases to debt, and a financial contraction will ensue.

== Publications ==
- The Volatility Machine: Emerging Economics and the Threat of Financial Collapse, Oxford: Oxford University Press, May 2001.
- The Great Rebalancing: Trade, Conflict, and the Perilous Road Ahead for the World Economy, Princeton: Princeton University Press, January 2013.
- Avoiding the Fall: China's Economic Restructuring, Washington: Carnegie Endowment for International Peace, September 2013.
- Trade Wars Are Class Wars: How Rising Inequality Distorts the Global Economy and Threatens International Peace with Matthew C. Klein, New Haven: Yale University Press, May 2020.
