= Renegades – the Espan Rebellion =

Renegades – the Espan Rebellion is a 1995 tabletop game supplement published by Iron Crown Enterprises for Silent Death: The Next Millennium.

== Contents ==
Renegades – the Espan Rebellion is a supplement in which the base game is expanded with a focused campaign built around the civil war within the Espan system. It charts the escalating conflict between rebellious fleets and government forces, providing background lore and a chronological framework to guide gameplay. The supplement introduces 19 scenarios that trace key engagements across the civil war, each serving as a tactical vignette or building block for a broader campaign. It also adds six fresh starship designs and two new combat tools—Salvage Claws and Tractor Beams.

== Publication history ==
Renegades – the Espan Rebellion is the inaugural supplement for Silent Death.

== Reception ==
Andy Butcher reviewed Renegades – the Espan Rebellion for Arcane magazine, rating it a 7 out of 10 overall, and stated that "If you've played through the scenarios in the basic Silent Death rules and find yourself hungry for more, Renegades: The Espan Rebellion is the next logical step. The new ships and weapons keep things interesting without adding greatly to the complexity of the game, and the new scenarios are varied and fun to play. Perhaps not a particularly inspiring book, but good, solid stuff nonetheless."
