= Joyside =

- Origin: Beijing, China
- Genres: Rock, Punk
- Years active: 2001–present
- Labels: Maybe Mars
- Members: Bian Yuan; Liu Hao; Liu Hongwei; Yang Yang; Guan Zheng
- references: Johnny Thunders, Iggy Pop, Sex Pistols, Dead Boys

Joyside is a Chinese rock band. They started out as an underground band by Bian Yuan in 2001, and they went from performing in small clubs for three years to recording CDs and performing on large stages. The band consists of Bian Yuan as vocalist, Liu Hao as bassist, Liu Hongwei, and Yang Yang playing guitar, and Guan Zheng on drums. Along with working as a band, the individuals members are also part of other musical projects. They were the subject of the documentary Wasted Orient by Kevin Fritz who felt they represented a side of China not seen in the West.

== Reception ==
In April, May and June 2007 Joyside embarked on a major European tour playing sold-out shows in Germany, Austria, Switzerland, France, and England. During the tour they were widely featured in the European press and German television. They were featured as the main band in Beijing Bubbles, a German documentary on the Chinese underground scene released in 2007, and in several other documentaries and histories of Chinese rock and roll. In September 2007, That's Beijing listed them as one of the top ten bands in China. In September 2007, Joyside played the Beijing Pop Festival alongside their heroes, the New York Dolls. Sylvain Sylvain in a press conference called them his favorite new band and offered to produce their next CD. In April 2019, Joyside reunited.

== Discography ==
Year	Album
2003	Everything Sucks
2004	Drunk is Beautiful
2006	Bitches of Rock n Roll
2007	Beijing Volume One
2007	Booze at Neptune's Dawn
2009	Maybe Tonight
