= Snapline =

Chinese band

- Origin: Beijing, China
- Genres: Post-punk
- Years active: 2005–present
- Labels: Maybe Mars
- Members: Chen Xi; Li Qing; Li Weisi
- Influenced by: Joy Division, Fad Gadget, Birthday Party

Snapline is a band based in Beijing, consisting of Li Qing on guitar and keyboards and Li Weisi on bass, who met while students at the Beijing Institute of Technology. Their music was dedicated to working out in a contemporary Beijing context the sounds and ideas produced by the noise and minimalist musicians of the 1970s and 1980s, especially focusing on the New York scene of that period. Wanting to also explore the dark, industrial music coming out of England during that period, especially from bands like Joy Division and the Cure, the two created a side project, which performed strange, drum-machine-driven music over dark, minor chords. Chen Xi, on vocals and drum machine, brought a softer sound to the band with his singing.

Ex-Public Image Ltd drummer Martin Atkins produced their first CD.

== Irrespective ==
As snippets of the recording filtered through the scene in China, the band's shows started drawing larger crowds, and they soon began to develop a strong following. A series of concerts at D-22 established them as one of the central bands in the scene, much loved by critics and musicians, although difficult at times for audiences to follow. In October, 2007, they performed a set at the Modern Sky festival. After that show it was clear to many that Snapline was one of the key bands in the musical explosion emanating from Beijing.

== Press ==
The subject of many articles in the Chinese press, the band was listed in the September 2007 edition of That's Beijing as one of the ten best bands in China and in an article in Rolling Stone that same year Li Qing was listed as one of China's four major guitar innovators.

== Discography ==
Year	Album
2005	No Beijing
2007	Close your Cold Eyes (Single)
2007	Look Directly Into The Sun: China Pop 2007
2007	God Save The Chairman
2007	Party Is Over, Pornostar
2010	China Invasion Tour 2010
2010	Future Eyes
2012	Phenomena
2014	Paper General (Future Eyes B-Side)
2018	Shou Hua
