= SMZB =

Chinese hardcore punk band

SMZB (Chinese: 生命之餅) is a Chinese hardcore punk band from Wuhan. They are a pioneer band in the punk scene in Wuhan and published by Maybe Mars records. Wu Wei, the singer and lyricist of the band, is widely regarded as one of the most influential punks in the country.
