= Sichuan Conservatory of Music =

Music school in Chengdu, China

The Sichuan Conservatory of Music (SCCM, Chinese: 四川音乐学院), founded in 1939, is an interdisciplinary music institution in Chengdu, Sichuan, China. SCCM is one of the select conservatories authorized by the State Council to confer graduate degrees to its music and fine arts majors. It is one of the 11 independent professional music colleges in China, one of the 31 independent professional music colleges in China, and the first batch of MFA education pilot units in China.

== Facilities ==
SCCM runs its own symphony orchestra, philharmonic orchestra, concert wind orchestra, Chinese traditional orchestra, college choirs, and pre-college ensembles. The conservatory holds concerts throughout the year and regularly invites guest artists and teachers from around the world.

Every two years, the school hosts an intensive international piano festival.

The government is in the process of constructing new concert halls on the existing conservatory grounds, as well as around the city of Chengdu.

== Chengdu Academy of Fine Arts ==
The Chengdu Academy of Fine Arts shares facilities with SCCM at its Xindu Campus.

== See also ==
- Music of Sichuan
- Sichuan Fine Arts Institute, Chongqing
