= Low Wormwood =

Chinese band

Low Wormwood (Chinese: 低苦艾) is a band from Lanzhou, China. They play folk music, blending rock and experimental elements. Low Wormwood observe the world from the unique perspective of Northwestern China. Theyexpress strong feelings for Lanzhou, a valley city with the Yellow River crossing between mountain ridges. In July 2012, the band won the Best Chinese Band award at the 2012 Chinese Media Music Awards in Macau.

== Members ==
- Vocal/Guitar: Liu Kun
- Guitar: San Er
- Bass: Xi Bin
- Drums: Dou Tao

== Studio albums ==
- 2009: 我们不由自主的亲吻对方 [We can't help kissing each other], 兵马司唱片
- 2011: 兰州 兰州 [Lanzhou Lanzhou], 兵马司唱片

兰州 兰州 (Lanzhou Lanzhou), which is the band's second album, named after the first track "Lanzhou Lanzhou", was issued in 2011. Though Lanzhou Lanzhou is written as a reference to the band's hometown, it is widely acknowledged by many people from different places who left their hometown.
