= The Bollands =

Folk band from New Zealand

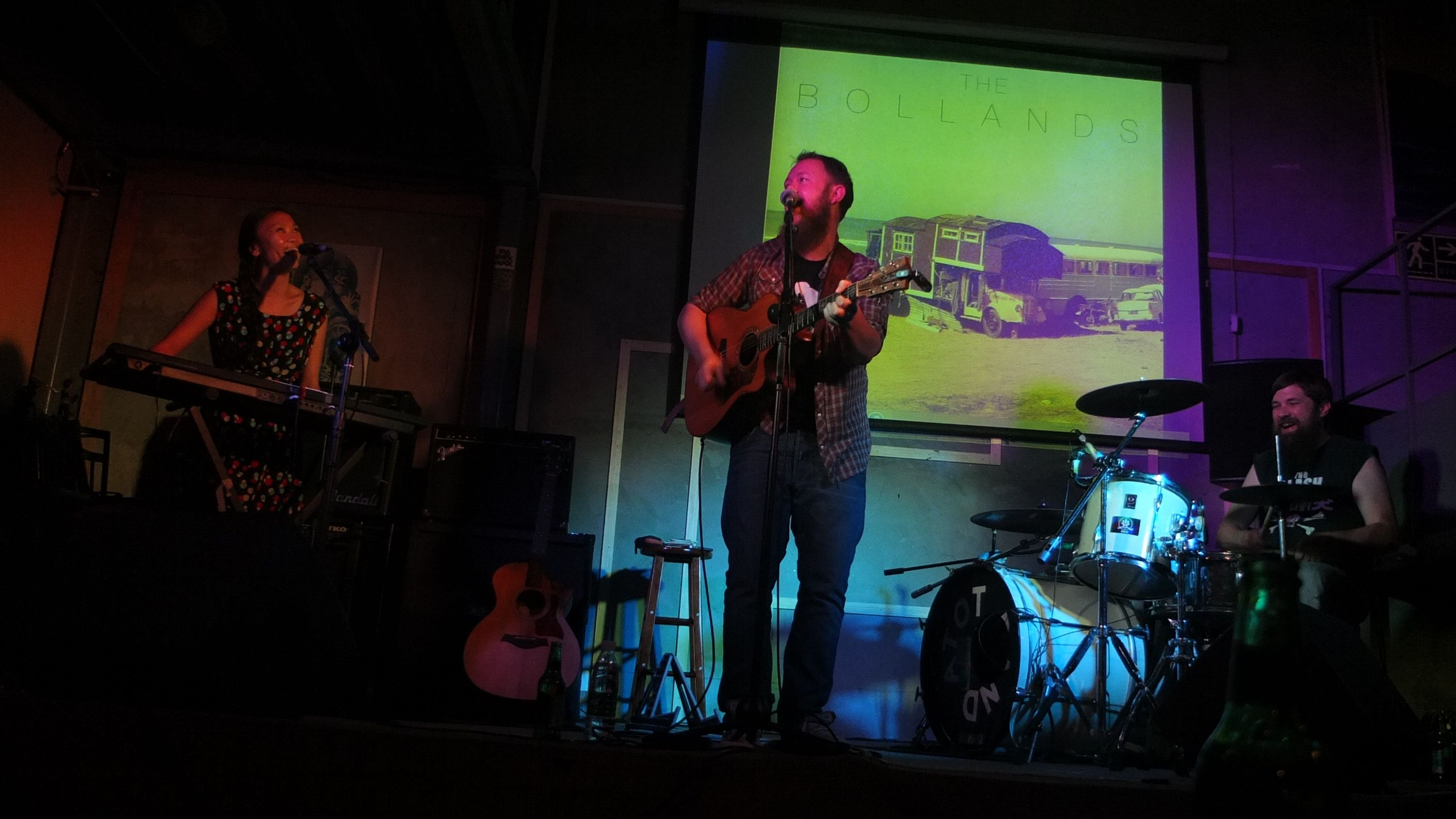
- The Bollands at Brown Sugar Jar (Shenzhen, China, April 2014).

Background information
- Origin: New Zealand
- Genres: "Foot-stomping folk", Folk music, Indie folk
- Years active: 2009–present
- Label: Monkey Records
- Members: Christian Bolland (vocals & guitar); Joyce Bolland (keyboard & vocals); Paul Maclean (drums)
- Website: http://www.thebollands.com

The Bollands are a 2-piece folk music band originally from New Zealand.

== Background ==
=== Formation ===
The Bollands were founded by Christian and Joyce Bolland; a husband-and-wife duo from New Zealand. Joyce's background was mostly related to the classical arts, such as classical piano and dance. Contrastly, Christian was raised in a less formal environment, having grown up travelling around New Zealand in his family's house truck. Christian Bolland is the main songwriter of the group, and was part of a Christian cult for around five years, and cites this as a strong influence on the music that he writes

In 2007, Christian and Joyce moved to Taiwan, and after returning to New Zealand for a time, they decided to return to Asia, this time to Hong Kong. The Bollands first began playing through The Wanch, a local live music bar in Wan Chai, as well as The Underground. Since their arrival, The Bollands have become a mainstay of the local indie music scene, performing at numerous music showcases and festivals. In 2012, The Bollands were featured on the government-run RTHK programs '藝坊星期天' (Art Square Sunday) in 2012.

The Bollands also played at the Spring Scream Festival in Kenting, Taiwan, in 2012 and Cloceknflap (Hong Kong), Zandari Festa (South Korea), Mu:Con (South Korea), Booshkabash (China), The Auckland Folk Festival (New Zealand). They have also toured Asia, The USA and New Zealand extensively.

=== First Album ===
The Bollands first, self-titled, album was a collection of songs that they had written in the two or three years previous, which they had played in bars and at music festivals around Asia and New Zealand. In April, 2013, The Bollands went on tour through Taiwan.

=== Paper Houses ===
During the production of their second album, Paper Houses, drummer Paul Maclean (who is also the drummer for the Hong Kong metal band DP) joined the band. Paper Houses was launched in June, 2014 at a public event held at Hidden Agenda. After the release of Paper Houses, The Bollands continued to tour around Asia.

=== All Of My Ghosts ===
The band's third album was recorded in Auckland, New Zealand in May 2016 at Lab Studios. It will be released in February 2017 under New Zealand & Berlin based record label, Money Records.

== Discography ==
=== Albums ===
- The Underground #5: Breaking Through (compilation) (05.2012)

03. The Song That Keeps Her Up
04. The Old Chest Nut

- The Bollands (2012)

01. When You Coming Home?
02. Sing to the Moon
03. Distort the Truth
04. A Drunk
05. What Have You Become?
06. Chestnut
07. Soapbox
08. Morning Tea
09. The Song That Keeps Her Up
10. Travel Song

- Paper Houses (14.06.2014)

01. Inside
02. Bad Nights
03. Stalker
04. Down To The Bone
05. Broken Scene
06. Room For You
07. Rag Doll
08. Call Me When You Do
09. Light Of Day
10. A Preacher's Organ
11. Come By Grace
12. Been All Around This World
