= Dear Eloise (band) =

Chinese rock band

- Origin: Beijing, China
- Genres: Noise rock, noise pop, shoegazing, slowcore, dream pop
- Years active: 2008–present
- Labels: Maybe Mars, Tenzenmen, Genjing
- Members: Yang Haisong; Sun Xia

Dear Eloise (Chinese: 亲爱的艾洛伊丝; pinyin: Qīn'ài de ài luò yī sī) is a Chinese rock band composed of vocalist/producer Yang Haisong (杨海崧) and Sun Xia (孙霞).

Formed in Beijing in 2008, the pair are known for their lo-fi DIY recordings that combine elements of shoegaze, indie pop, noise rock and experimental music. In addition to playing all of the instruments themselves, the husband-wife duo record and edit all of the band's music in their home studio.

While they do not perform live and have released their recordings inconspicuously through the Beijing-based vinyl label Genjing Records and CD label Maybe Mars, the duo has managed to gain a loyal following in both the Chinese independent music scene and with critics abroad.

Their seventh effort, Vanishing Winter, was released on April 6, 2013, on Genjing Records. An eighth release, a split with Australian alternative rock outfit Underground Lovers, was released in August 2013 with cooperation from the Melbourne-based record label Rubber Records.

== Discography ==
=== Albums ===
- The Words That Were Burnt (Maybe Mars, 2010)
- 美丽陌生人 (Beauty In Strangers) (Maybe Mars, 2011)
- Farewell To The Summer (Maybe Mars, 2014)
- Uncontrollable, Ice Age Stories (Maybe Mars, 2016)
- They Slipped Away From My Mind Just Like This (Maybe Mars, 2019)

=== Singles ===
- 城堡 (Castle)/如果它是美丽的 (If It's Beautiful) (Genjing, 2010)
- Song For Her/Song For Him (Genjing, 2011)
- I'll Be Your Mirror (Genjing/Bubutz, 2012)
- Man Without A Name / Haunted (Acedia) (Genjing/Rubber 2013) (Split single with Underground Lovers)
- Vanishing Winter/The Place In White Light (Genjing, 2013)
- Dive / Summer Begins II (Maybe Mars, 2019) (Split with Lonely Leary)
