= Gerhana Skacinta =

Malaysian ska, rocksteady and reggae band

- Also known as: GSC, Gerhana
- Origin: Kuala Lumpur, Malaysia
- Genres: Ska; RockSteady; Reggae; dub
- Years active: 1999–2008, 2009–present
- Labels: Clockwork Records, Life Records
- Website: gerhanaskacinta.com

Gerhana Skacinta (commonly abbreviated as GSC, and also known simply as Gerhana) is a Malaysian ska, rocksteady, reggae and dub band formed in Kuala Lumpur in the late 1990s by trumpeter and vocalist Edy J. Herwan.

Emerging during Malaysia’s third-wave ska revival, the band is noted for remaining faithful to traditional Jamaican ska and rocksteady rather than adopting ska-punk and ska-pop styles common in the scene.

The band's name is derived from the Malay words gerhana ("eclipse") and cinta ("love"), combined with the musical genre ska.

The band draws influence from Jamaican acts such as The Skatalites, Lord Kitchener and The Wailers.

== History ==
=== Formation and early years (late 1990s–2001) ===
Gerhana Skacinta was formed in Kuala Lumpur in 1999 by Edy J. Herwan. The original line-up included Widy (vocals), Rejab (trombone), Didi (guitar), Fairus (keyboards), Jalut (bass), Bakri (drums), and Edy on trumpet and vocals.

In 2001, the band contributed a ska arrangement of "Jangan Tunggu Lama Lama" to the Tribute to Sweet Charity compilation album released by Clockwork Records.

=== Skali Skale and Boss Sounds (2002–2003) ===
The band signed with Clockwork Records in 2002. Their debut EP Skali Skale was released the same year.

Their debut studio album Boss Sounds followed in 2002, incorporating ska, rocksteady, reggae and influences from rhythm and blues, soul and jazz.

=== The New Authentic (2004–2006) ===
In 2004, the band released their second studio album The New Authentic.

The album included collaborations with guest musicians and contributed to wider recognition within Malaysia’s independent music scene.

=== This Is Ska and hiatus (2007–2008) ===
The band released their third studio album This Is Ska in 2007.

Following performances including Sunburst KL 2008, the band entered a hiatus. During this period, Edy J. Herwan pursued his reggae project The Aggrobeats.

=== Reunion and later activity (2009–present) ===
The band resumed activity in later years, performing at festivals and live events across Malaysia and the region.

In 2021, they released Ali Baba Ska, a reinterpretation of P. Ramlee’s "Ya Habibi Ali Baba" as part of a tribute project.

The song has since become associated with their live performances and is frequently performed as a closing number.

In 2024, the band released Hitam Putih Kuala Lumpur under Life Records.

The album features collaborations with Fad Majid, Jason and Hanis Hamdan, who joined as a session vocalist.

== Musical style and influences ==
Gerhana Skacinta’s music is rooted in traditional Jamaican ska, with influences from rocksteady, reggae and dub.

The band is part of Malaysia’s third-wave ska movement but is noted for avoiding ska-punk and ska-pop styles. Their influences include The Skatalites, Lord Kitchener and The Wailers.

Their arrangements feature horn-driven melodies, offbeat guitar rhythms, walking bass lines, and elements of rhythm and blues, soul and jazz.

== Members ==
=== Current members ===
- Edy J. Herwan – trumpet, guitar, vocals (1999–present)
- Widy – vocals (1999–present)
- Hanis Hamdan – vocals (session 2022, 2023–present)
- Fairus – keyboards (1999–present)
- Bakri – drums (1999–present)
- Fahrin – tenor saxophone (session 2022, 2023–present)
- Nadzmi – alto saxophone (session 2022, 2023–present)
- Weed – trumpet (session 2022, 2023–present)
- Skaloot – bass guitar (2009–present)

=== Former members ===
- Jalut – bass guitar
- Rejab – trombone
- Didi – guitar
- Bijan – keyboards
- Acong – bass guitar
- Rudy – drums
- Chiwok – trombone
- Olie – keyboards, arranger
- Pian – percussion
- Pedd – vocals

== Discography ==
=== Studio albums ===
- Boss Sounds (2002)
- The New Authentic (2004)
- This Is Ska (2007)
- Hitam Putih Kuala Lumpur (2024)

=== Extended plays ===
- Skali Skale (2002)

=== Compilation appearances ===
- Tribute to Sweet Charity (2001) – "Jangan Tunggu Lama Lama"
