= Xindu, Chengdu =

District of Chengdu, Sichuan, China

Xindu 新都区
- District
- District of Xindu, City of Chengdu
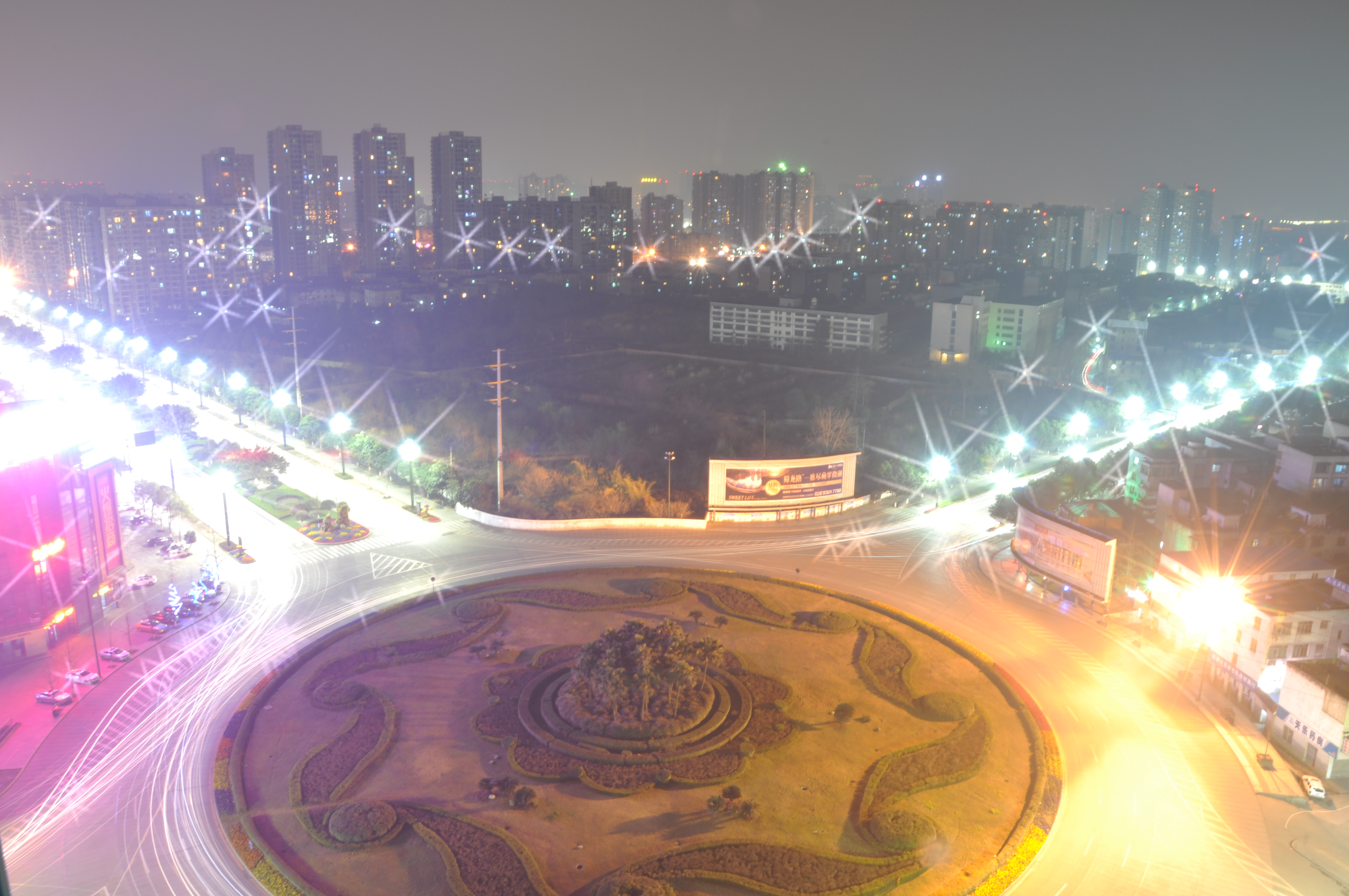

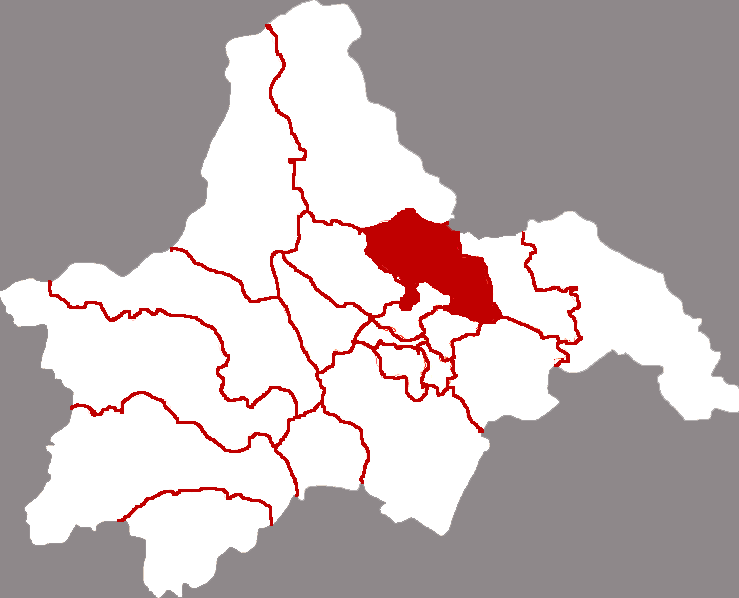
- Location of Xindu in Chengdu

- Location in Sichuan
- Coordinates: 30°48′45″N 104°10′25″E
- Country: China
- Province: Sichuan
- Sub-provincial city: Chengdu
- District seat: Guihu Subdistrict

Area
  - Total: 497 km^{2} (192 sq mi)

Population (2020 census)
  - Total: 1,558,466
  - Density: 3,140/km^{2} (8,120/sq mi)
- Time zone: UTC+8 (China Standard)
- Postal code: 6105XX

Xindu District (Chinese: 新都区; pinyin: Xīndū Qū; lit. 'new metropolis district') is a suburban district of the City of Chengdu, Sichuan, China. It covers part of the city's northern suburbs.

== Overview ==
The Xindu District borders the prefecture-level city of Deyang to the north. The population of the district is 600,000, residing in an area of 481 square kilometres (186 sq mi), only 32.6 km^{2} (12.6 sq mi) of which is part of the city's urban area. Xindu District was founded as an administrative district in 2001. It is a historical and cultural region encompassing 13 towns and 255 villages.

The Sichuan Conservatory of Music and the associated Chengdu Academy of Fine Arts have a campus here.

== Nicknames ==
Xindu District is known as the "Tianfu Pearl" (天府明珠) and "Fragrant City" (香城).

== Administrative divisions ==
Xindu District administers 7 subdistricts and 2 towns:

- Dafeng Subdistrict 大丰街道
- Sanhe Subdistrict 三河街道
- Xindu Subdistrict 新都街道
- Xinfan Subdistrict 新繁街道
- Shibantan Subdistrict 石板滩街道
- Banzhuyuan Subdistrict 斑竹园街道
- Guihu Subdistrict 桂湖街道
- Qingliu Town 清流镇
- Juntun Town 军屯镇

== Climate ==
Climate data for Xindu, elevation 515 m (1,690 ft), (1991–2020 normals, extremes 1981–present)
Month	Jan	Feb	Mar	Apr	May	Jun	Jul	Aug	Sep	Oct	Nov	Dec	Year
Record high °C (°F)	18.7 (65.7)	23.1 (73.6)	31.6 (88.9)	35.5 (95.9)	36.3 (97.3)	35.8 (96.4)	39.2 (102.6)	41.2 (106.2)	36.1 (97.0)	30.3 (86.5)	26.1 (79.0)	18.4 (65.1)	41.2 (106.2)
Mean daily maximum °C (°F)	9.5 (49.1)	12.5 (54.5)	17.4 (63.3)	23.2 (73.8)	27.1 (80.8)	29.0 (84.2)	30.5 (86.9)	30.3 (86.5)	26.1 (79.0)	21.1 (70.0)	16.4 (61.5)	10.9 (51.6)	21.2 (70.1)
Daily mean °C (°F)	5.9 (42.6)	8.5 (47.3)	12.7 (54.9)	17.9 (64.2)	21.9 (71.4)	24.5 (76.1)	26.1 (79.0)	25.6 (78.1)	22.0 (71.6)	17.5 (63.5)	12.7 (54.9)	7.4 (45.3)	16.9 (62.4)
Mean daily minimum °C (°F)	3.3 (37.9)	5.7 (42.3)	9.3 (48.7)	13.9 (57.0)	17.9 (64.2)	21.1 (70.0)	22.7 (72.9)	22.3 (72.1)	19.3 (66.7)	15.1 (59.2)	10.1 (50.2)	4.9 (40.8)	13.8 (56.8)
Record low °C (°F)	−4.1 (24.6)	−2.7 (27.1)	−1.9 (28.6)	4.1 (39.4)	5.7 (42.3)	14.5 (58.1)	16.5 (61.7)	15.7 (60.3)	12.7 (54.9)	2.6 (36.7)	0.7 (33.3)	−4.6 (23.7)	−4.6 (23.7)
Average precipitation mm (inches)	7.8 (0.31)	9.7 (0.38)	20.4 (0.80)	41.8 (1.65)	66.8 (2.63)	109.1 (4.30)	195.1 (7.68)	200.3 (7.89)	110.5 (4.35)	38.9 (1.53)	14.1 (0.56)	5.6 (0.22)	820.1 (32.3)
Average precipitation days (≥ 0.1 mm)	6.9	7.1	10.3	12.0	13.1	14.6	16.1	14.6	14.5	13.7	6.7	5.4	135
Average snowy days	1.3	0.4	0	0	0	0	0	0	0	0	0.1	0.3	2.1
Average relative humidity (%)	80	77	74	73	70	76	82	82	82	82	81	81	78
Mean monthly sunshine hours	48.8	53.8	85.6	112.5	117.4	105.2	121.3	130.6	71.2	56.5	58.8	44.2	1,005.9
Percentage possible sunshine	15	17	23	29	28	25	28	32	19	16	19	14	22
Source: China Meteorological Administrationall-time extreme temperatureall-time July High
