= Age of War =

Studio album by Black Hour
- Released: 25 October 2011
- Recorded: 2009–2011 at 11/8 Studios in Islamabad, Pakistan
- Genres: Heavy metal, Progressive rock
- Length: 38:00
- Labels: Yourlabel Records; Rearts Records
- Producer: Jonathan Jones

Black Hour chronology
Age of War (2011)	Sins Remain (2016)

Singles from Black Hour
- 1. "Crucifix" Released: 2011

Age of War is the debut studio album by Pakistani progressive rock band Black Hour, released on 25 October 2011 in the United States by Yourlabel Records, and in Pakistan by Afterwind Records. It was reissued in 2020 as a remastered version by Rearts Records. The recording sessions occurred at the 11/8 Studios in Islamabad, Pakistan with production by Black Hour alongside Jonathan Jones. The album sold over 10,000 copies worldwide and helped the band gain success both locally and internationally.

== Background ==
Black Hour was formed as a heavy metal band in 2007 in Islamabad, Pakistan, by lead guitarist Hashim Mehmood. In 2007, Hashim asked his college friends, Hasan Rauf and Saad Javed to join Black Hour on guitars and bass alongside his brother Daim Mehmood to be the drummer of the band. After several line-up changes, in 2008, the band recruited Tayyab Rehman on vocals and in an interview with Metalhead Spotted, confirmed, "Tayyab suddenly clicked with the band" after meeting the lead guitarist, Hashim Mehmood. This prompted the band to perform in the local metal scene and gaining recognition in Pakistan. Soon after in 2009, Hasan Rauf left the band and was replaced by Mubbashir Sheikh on guitars.

=== Recording and production ===
With Rehman as the vocalist and Sheikh on guitars, Black Hour went on to perform and participate at various underground musical competitions and after three successive wins at the Underground Battle of the Bands in Pakistan and getting acclaim for their singles, "Age of War" and "Salvation", the band decided to work on their debut album in the mid of 2010. During an interview with Metalindia Magazine, "it wasn't until 2009 that Black Hour became what it is today. And although it's a cliché but the journey hasn't been very smooth for Blackhour, but then again our fans, friends and family have always been there to help us through some really tough times, and we wouldn't be where we are today if it weren't for each and every one of them", Rehman said on Age of War, the debut album by the band.

Black Hour recorded its debut album, Age of War, at 11/8 Studios in Islamabad, Pakistan in 2010. However, the album was not released until October 25, 2011, via Yourlabel Records in the United States of America and by Afterwind Records in Pakistan. The album sold over 10,000 copies worldwide and helped the band gain success both locally and internationally. Soon after a few live shows in Pakistan, Black Hour returned to the studio to begin work on a second album and went on to perform on the World Music Day with their new single titled "Winds of Change" and "Battle Cry" from their upcoming second album in June 2013.

== Track listing ==
All lyrics are written by Tayyab Rehman; all music is composed by Hashim Mehmood, Tayyab Rehman and Hasan Rauf except where noted.

No.	Title	Writer(s)	Length
1.	"Age of War"	Hasan Rauf	3:30
2.	"Land of Uncertainty"	Hasan Rauf and Tayyab Rehman	4:21
3.	"Subliminal Control"		6:06
4.	"Salvation"	Hasan Rauf	6:54
5.	"Suicide and Comfort"		5:57
6.	"The Hourglass"	Hasan Rauf and Tayyab Rehman	6:32
7.	"Crucifix"		4:29

== Personnel ==
Credits for Age of War.

Black Hour

- Tayyab Rehman – lead vocals
- Hashim Mehmood – guitars, backing vocals
- Hasan Rauf - guitars
- Daim Mehmood – drums, percussion
- Salman Afzal – bass

Production

- Produced by Jonathan Jones
- Recorded and Mixed at 11/8 Studios in Islamabad, Pakistan
