= Daighila =

- Origin: Rembau, Malaysia
- Genres: Screamo; Emoviolence
- Years active: 2001–present
- Labels: Cactus; Stoneville; Epidemic

Daighila are a Malaysian hardcore punk band formed in late 2001 in Rembau.

== Members ==
The band has four members.

- Mohd Adzuan Idris – vocals (2001–present)
- Mohd Norazmi Mustafa – guitar (2001–present)
- Norhafizat Ismail – guitar, drums (2001–present)
- Zamoodi Jamaludin – bass (2001–present)

== Discography ==
=== Studio albums ===
- Daighila (2022)

=== EPs ===
- Henceforth (2009)

=== Splits ===
- Fanzui Xiangfa / Daighila (2010)
- Daighila / Circuits (2011)
- Pazahora / Daighila (2012)
- Daighila / This Is Atlantis (2012)
- Daighila / Grinding Halt

=== Compilations ===
- Miscellaneous (2009)
- Transitions (2012)

Singles

- "Gandasuli" (2022)
- "Contradictions" (2022)
