= P.K. 14 =

P.K. 14 is a Chinese rock band composed of vocalist/producer Yang Haisong (杨海崧), Xu Bo (许波) on guitar, bassist Shi Xudong (施旭东), and drummer Jonathan Leijonhufvud (雷坛坛, or "Tan Tan"). Their post-punk, indie rock musical style has been influential on the Chinese rock scene since their first album was released in 2001, making them "elder statesmen of the Beijing rock scene". Formed in 1997 in Nanjing, they moved to Beijing in 2001. One of five groups selected by Time magazine as Asia's best bands in 2008, the band's name is intended as an abbreviation of "public kingdom for teens". The band, which sings exclusively in Mandarin Chinese, has been praised for its "sharp, post-punk" sound: "P.K.14, for all its lyrical depth, creates an overwhelming barrage of beautiful postpunk chaos".

In 2008, they visited Sweden, the homeland of Leijonhufvud, to record their fourth album, City Weather Sailing (Chengshi Tianqi de Hangxing).

In addition to his work with P.K.14, Yang Haisong is also a sought-after record producer in China, working primarily with the Beijing-based labels Maybe Mars, Modern Sky and Genjing Records to produce efforts from Carsick Cars, Birdstriking, Skip Skip Ben Ben, The Dyne, Goodnight Goodluck, Alpine Decline, Fallacy, Doc Talk Shock, Dream Can and his own side project, the lo-fi noise duo Dear Eloise.

== Discography ==
=== Studio albums ===
- 2001 Upstairs, Turn Left (by Sub Jam & Empty Egg)
- 2004 Whoever, Whoever & Whoever (by Modern Sky)
- 2005 White Paper (by Modern Sky)
- 2008 City Weather Sailing (by Maybe Mars)
- 2013 1984 (by Maybe Mars)
- 2018 What We Talk About When We Talk About His Name (by Maybe Mars)

=== Compilations ===
- 2002 Modern Sky 4 (by Modern Sky)
- 2009 Maybe Mars 2007-2009 Vol.1 (by Maybe Mars)
- 2010 Converse presents: The China Invasion Tour 2010 (featuring bands from Maybe Mars) (by Maybe Mars)

=== Bootlegs ===
- 2010 Live at Zoomin' Night: Whoever, Whoever & Whoever (by Liezhi Sifang/劣质私房)
- 2011 Zoomin' Night Live (by Liezhi Sifang/劣质私房)
