= Silent Death =

Tabletop game

Silent Death is a miniatures space battle game by Iron Crown Enterprises (ICE), based on the Star Strike sourcebook to the Spacemaster role-playing game, but with vastly simplified mechanics. In particular, combat is fast and lethal, and so chances of crewman death or ship destruction are frighteningly high in a single battle. This makes Silent Death much more suitable as a standalone game than as a space-combat addition to a role-playing game.

== Basic rules ==
The base rules revolve around ships with just a few key attributes: drive indicates the speed of the craft, damage reduction its armor, and defensive value its difficulty to hit, based on size, speed, and energy shielding. Most attacks are made with a single roll of three dice. The size of two of the dice is determined by the type of weapons. For example, the more accurate laser and ion weapons receive d8s, whereas clumsier (but potentially deadlier) blaster and plasma weapons receive d6s. The third die is determined by a crewman's gunnery skill, and can vary between a d4 and a d10. If the sum of the dice, after a few modifications, is greater than or equal to the defender's defensive value, the shot is a hit, with the damage also being shown on the same dice. A Splattergun, for instance, does "medium" damage, and so the middle of the three dice values would be the amount of damage delivered, after subtracting the defender's damage reduction. Different damage mechanics apply for ships equipped with (slow-moving) torpedoes or (fast-moving) missiles. The damage taken is marked off on a ship's damage track, which will show special damage taken at certain levels, including losing weapons, armor, and drive, or taking a special critical hit. These simple attack rules make for much more fast-paced combat than most of ICE's games.

== Games ==
The original version of Silent Death, with a relatively small number of ships, all fighter-class, was followed by two expansion sets, which added more ships, optional rules, and Gunboat-class craft. A later revision, called Silent Death: The Next Millennium, combined these rules into a single sourcebook and overhauled the look of the miniatures, also replacing the standard lead with plastic models. Later additions to this version added yet more ships, including escort ships; expansions included Renegades – the Espan Rebellion, Sunrunners, Warhounds, Operation – Dry Dock, and Universal Night Watch. Each source book came with a number of standard scenarios for two or more players, but each ship also had a cost value, so players could construct their own fleets and run battles at any scale.

== History ==
When ICE went bankrupt, the rights to Silent Death were purchased and used to make an online game, Silent Death Online, which was itself discontinued in 2001.

Silent Death is available again from Metal Express.

== Reception ==
Pyramid magazine reviewed Silent Death: The Next Millennium and stated that "I'll admit it. I'm a sucker for a box full of Neat Stuff. And that's what first drew me to Silent Death: the Next Millennium. Forty-eight (count 'em) lil' rokkit ships that almost come bursting out of the box."

Andy Butcher reviewed Silent Death: The Next Millennium for Arcane magazine, rating it a 7 out of 10 overall, and stated that "All in all, Silent Death: The Next Millennium is a fun game. It's quick to learn, easy to play, and the variety of ships and weapons on offer keeps things interesting, at least for a while. It does perhaps lack some of the depth of more complex wargame systems, and isn't quite as absorbing as it might be. But if you love the starship combat scenes in Star Wars, you'll have a good time playing this."

Dale Donovan comments: "Silent Death was one of the first games I encountered where the elegance of the mechanics impressed me as much as its theme attracted me. I can count on one hand the other titles that so successfully meld their mechanical elements into the overall feel of the game. Silent Death: The Next Millennium is an experience every gamer should seek out."

In a retrospective review of Silent Death in Black Gate, Tony Den said "You don't even have to use the specific ships available, as it is possible come up with your own designs to suit your game needs. You want a crossover where a squadron of Original BSG Cylon Raiders take on a Federation ship, this is the system that will allow it to happen!"

== Reviews ==
- Shadis #22
- Science Fiction Age
- Syfy
