= Queen Sea Big Shark =

Chinese indie rock band

Queen Sea Big Shark 后海大鲨鱼
- Origin: China
- Genres: Dance-rock; alternative rock
- Years active: 2004–present
- Label: Modernsky
- Members: Fu Han; Wang Jinghan; Wang Zi

Queen Sea Big Shark (Chinese: 后海大鲨鱼; pinyin: hòuhǎi dàshāyú) is a Beijing-based Chinese indie rock band. The group was founded by lead singer Fu Han (付菡), guitarist Cao Pu (曹璞), guitarist Wang Zi (王梓), bassist Wang Jinghan (王静涵), and drummer Xiao Wu (小武).

The group formed in 2005. On how they got their name, Fu Han said: "One day we walked around Houhai (Queen Sea) Lake in Beijing, we saw a sign that read 'This is mine, don't even touch it, I'm the Houhai (Queen Sea) big shark,' then we thought, 'Wow! That's cool. Let's take it.'"

They released their self-titled debut album in 2007 under the Modern Sky label. The band's sound in this era has been compared to the American band Yeah Yeah Yeahs, for whom them also opened during a short 2009 tour of the United States entitled "Sing for China". The tour was to promote awareness for AIDS in China and featured other Beijing bands like Hedgehog and Casino Demon.

In 2009, they released a song and music video, entitled "Let's Play", exclusive to the Converse China website. Theis was followed by their second album Wave in October, 2010. Both of these works feature a more electronic sound than the first album.

After a six-year hiatus, Queen Sea Big Shark released their third album, Beijing Surfer's Adventure, in March 2016. This album incorporates many more pop and hip-hop elements than their previous albums.

Founding drummer Xiao Wu left the band in 2018 to pursue a career as a music teacher. He was replaced by Wu Xiaodong (伍晓东) for the recording of the singles Superpowers (2018), Haiyan Shuo (2020) and Benpao ba... (2020). These songs also featured Wang Zi (王梓) of Casino Demon as second guitarist.

In the summer of 2020, the band gained increased exposure by appearing on the iQiyi music show The Big Band (season 2, episode 5), where they performed the single Mammoth from the Beijing Surfer's Adventure album. The pre-performance interview for this program explained that Cao Pu was at that time trapped outside of China due to COVID-19 border closures, leaving Wang as the group's sole guitarist. Cao has to date not returned to the band despite border reopenings.

Fu Han would go on to release her first solo album in 2021, but the new QSBS line-up kept touring until January 2022, when live music largely ground to a halt due to the COVID-19 pandemic. During this forced hiatus, Fu Han became a mother in July 2023.

The band resumed touring in May 2024. Promotional materials for the post-pandemic performances feature only Fu and the two Wangs, suggesting that Wu is not considered the band's permanent drummer. In 2025 they released their first single in five years, Wei! Shenma, with the drum parts now recorded by one Yu Zheng (于政).

== Members ==
=== Current line-up ===
- Fu Han – vocals
- Wang Jinghan – bass
- Wang Zi – guitar (2004–present)

=== Former members ===
- Cao Pu – guitar (2004–2011,2014-2016)
- Xiao Wu – drums (2004–2018)
- Wu Xiaodong – drums (2018–2020?)

== Discography ==
Albums

Title	Year
Queen Sea Big Shark	2007
Wave	2010
Beijing Surfer's Adventure	2016

Fu Han solo album

Title	Year
Neo Era Romance	2021

Non-album singles

Title	Year
Let's Play	2010
Superpowers	2018
Haiyan Shuo 海燕说	2020
Benpao ba, nianqing de juren a, fanzheng hui diedao 奔跑吧，年轻的巨人啊，反正会跌倒	2020
Wei! Shenma 喂！神马	2025

Demos

Title	Year
Hard Heart	2006
