= Carsick Cars =

Chinese rock trio

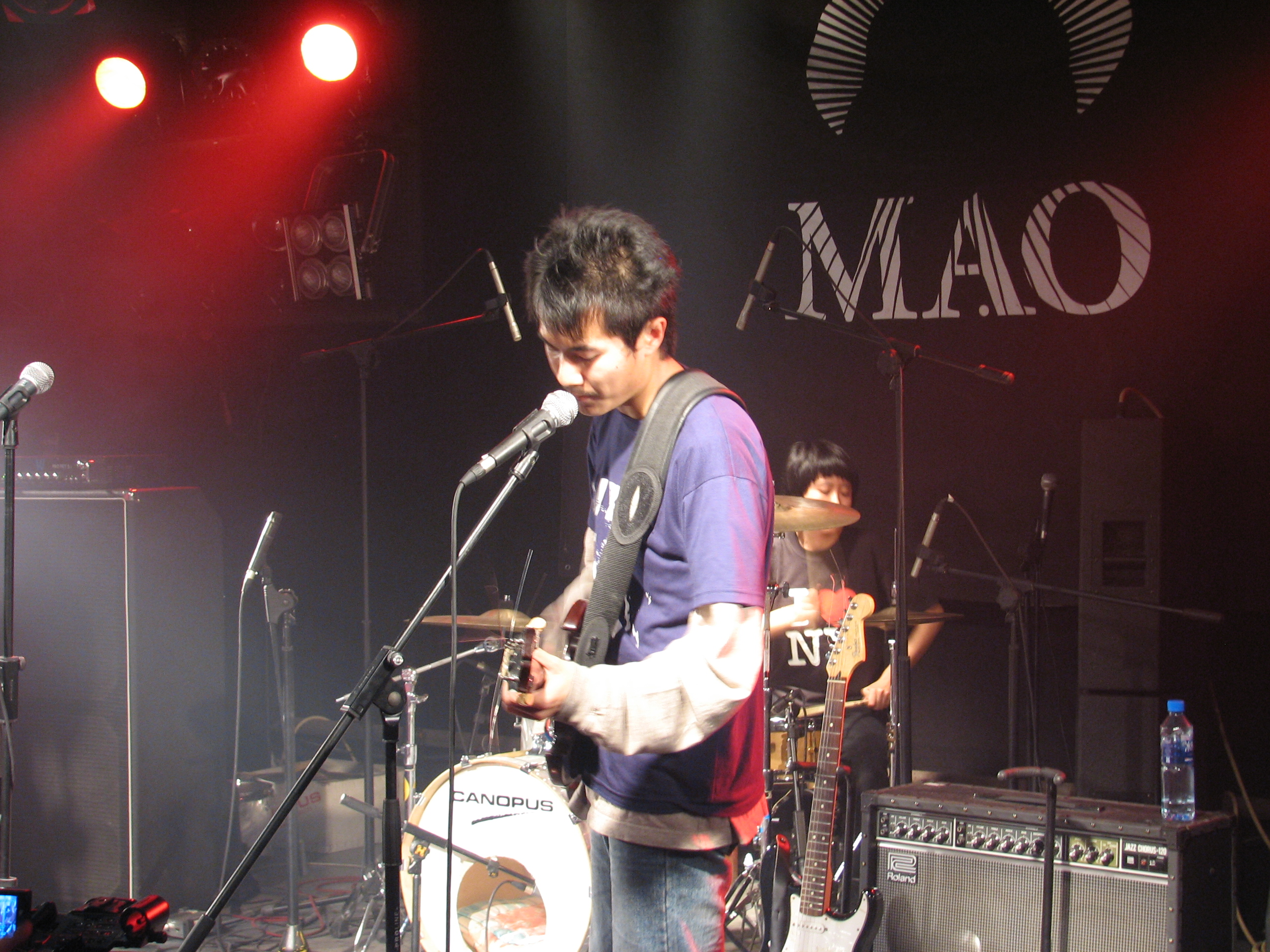
- Zhang Shouwang and Li Qing in 2007

Background information
- Origin: Beijing, China
- Genres: Indie rock, Noise pop
- Years active: 2005–present
- Label: Maybe Mars
- Members: Zhang Shouwang (Chinese: 张守望); Li Weisi (Chinese: 李维思); Li Qing (Chinese: 李青)
- Past members: He Fan (Chinese: 何凡); Houzi (Chinese: 猴子); Ben Ben (Chinese: 斑斑)
- Website: carsickcars.com

Carsick Cars is a Chinese indie rock trio formed in March 2005.

Carsick Cars released their self-titled debut album in 2007 on Maybe Mars in China and on tenzenmen in Australia. The band joined Sonic Youth for their European tour in Prague and Vienna in 2007. A 7" single of tracks taken from that album was released in the UK by Suyin Records. In June 2009, the band released their second album, You Can Listen, You Can Talk. In March 2010, 2011, and 2012 Carsick Cars performed at the SXSW music festival in Austin, Texas.

As of November 2010, Li Weisi and Li Qing left the band to focus on their other projects. They were replaced by He Fan (Birdstriking) on bass and Ben Ben (BOYZ & GIRL, Skip Skip Ben Ben). Ben Ben was subsequently replaced by Houzi.

Li Weisi (bass) and Li Qing (drums) returned in 2017 and remain in the band.

Their debut song, Zhong Nan Hai, has been cited as the anthem for the Beijing underground music scene.

== Notable performances ==
- August 25, 2007: Prague (with Sonic Youth)
- August 26, 2007: Vienna (with Sonic Youth)
- October 2–4, 2007: Modern Sky Festival, Beijing

== Discography ==
- 2006: Live At D-22 (CD-R)
- 2007: Beijing Volume Two (EP)
- 2007: Carsick Cars
- 2009: You Can Listen, You Can Talk
- 2011: She Will Wait / Could You Be There (Cassette Only)
- 2013: The Other 3 (EP)
- 2014: 3
- 2020: Wake Me Up (Single)
- 2024: Aha
