= Unite Asia =

Music website

- Company type: Private
- Website type: News website
- Available in: English
- Founded: Hong Kong; March 2015; 11 years ago
- Headquarters: Hong Kong
- Founder: Riz Farooqi
- Website: https://uniteasia.org/
- Current status: Active

Unite Asia is a website dedicated to covering news about punk, hardcore, and metal music from Asia. The website features reviews, interviews, and information about latest releases from bands based in Asia or for non-Asian bands performing in Asia. Unite Asia is based in Hong Kong and was founded in 2015 by Riz Farooqi of King Ly Chee.

== History ==
Unite Asia was founded in 2015 by Riz Farooqi of Hong Kong based band King Ly Chee in order to showcase the many rock and metal bands across Asia. Frustrated with the lack of media coverage for Asian bands, Farooqi decided to launch his own website in order to create a platform to grow the punk, hardcore, and metal communities.

The name of the website comes from the 2007 King Ly Chee song of the same name. The song was later re-recorded with seven vocalists from all over Asia and premiered on Unite Asia in 2015, the same year as the website's debut.

In 2017, Unite Asia organized the Unite Asia Showcase which was a concert featuring six local Hong Kong bands who were releasing either an EP or album. A free CD featuring songs from each band was given out to the concertgoers.

== Overview ==
The goal of the platform is to not only grow the local music scene in Hong Kong, but to also connect the community across the Asian continent. Similar to other music news websites such as Metal Sucks and Metal Injection, Unite Asia frequently uploads information about new releases, videos, and other news items related to the punk, hardcore, and metal scene. However, Unite Asia focuses entirely on the Asian music scene. The website gives smaller indie bands a platform to reach out to the community as anyone can submit news to the website.

Since the underground music scene in Asia is not as developed as its counterparts in North America or Europe, many bands frequently have problems with tour promoters or concert venues. Unite Asia attempts to bring more transparency to the industry by hosting a database of tour promoters within Asia that have been screened and proven to be legitimate.
