= Ziwo jiaoyu =

Chinese band

Ziwo jiaoyu (自我教育乐队 Self-Education band) were a Beijing new wave rock band of the early '90s.

In 1990 they were of the six bands featured in the Modern Music Concert, along with Cui Jian's ADO, Zang Tianshuo's 1989 (band), Baobei xiongdi (Baby Brother), the all-girl Cobra, and Huxi (Breathing). In 1991, with the song Caqu yǎnlèi (擦去眼泪), they were one of the bands featured with Zhang Chu, The Face, ADO, Dou Wei's Black Panther and Tang Dynasty on the first China Fire CD compilation.

In 1992 band renamed as Xindi yuedui (新谛乐队) first album Bu cōngmáng (不要匆忙) title track featured on the compilation Yaogun Beijing (摇滚北京).
