= Epic (Tang Dynasty album) =

1998 studio album by Tang Dynasty

Studio album by Tang Dynasty
- Released: December 20, 1998
- Genre: Progressive rock, heavy metal, folk metal
- Length: 62:55
- Label: Jingwen Records
- Producer: Otomo Koetsu

Tang Dynasty chronology
Tang Dynasty (1992)	Epic (1998)	Romantic Knight (2008)

Singles from Epic
- 1. "Time at My Heels"; 2. "Epic" Released: March 1, 2000

Music video
- "Time at My Heels" on YouTube

Epic (Chinese: 演义; pinyin: Yǎnyì) is the second album by seminal Chinese metal band Tang Dynasty, released on December 20, 1998, on Jingwen Records. It is the band's only album to feature founding guitarist Kaiser Kuo, a Chinese-American responsible for shaping the band's early direction. The album's release followed an extended period of turmoil within the band.

== Background ==
Formed in 1989, Tang Dynasty rose to international fame with their 1992 self-titled debut album, released on Taiwanese record label Magic Stone Records. Considered to be the "[first real embodiment]...[of] what many Chinese young people imagined a 'real' rock band should be", Tang Dynasty sold upwards of 900,000 official copies worldwide. The band was slated for a follow-up release in 1995. By then, however, frontman Ding Wu and bassist Zhang Ju had developed a serious heroin addiction, which hampered productivity. On May 11, 1995, Zhang was killed in a motorcycle accident. Tang Dynasty quickly recruited ex-Breathing bassist Gu Zhong as a temporary member in July to fulfill several live appearances, but halted all other activities as the surviving members were too affected by Zhang's death to continue writing and rehearsing. The group later split with Magic Stone Records, claiming the label had not supported them through hard times.

Following Zhang's death, Ding reached out to founding guitarist Kaiser Kuo, inviting him to rejoin Tang Dynasty. Kuo, who was attending graduate school at the time, returned to China in June 1996. The surviving members of Tang Dynasty had been working on a tribute album entitled Goodbye Zhang Ju (Chinese: 再见张炬; pinyin: Zàijiàn Zhāng Jǜ). Reunited with his former bandmates, Kuo contributed the song "Your Vision" to the project. Goodbye Zhang Ju was released in July 1997.

Although Kuo initially did not want to rejoin the group, it became clear that Tang Dynasty would not be able to go on without his intervention. In August 1996, lead guitarist Liu Yijun quit the band over musical differences. Kuo stepped in the following month, Gu Zhong was made a permanent member, and Ding Wu finally kicked his addiction. Tang Dynasty played their comeback show at the Keep in Touch Bar in Beijing on July 12, 1997. They were managed by Hong Kong industry veteran Dickson Dee for a short time before signing to Beijing-based label Jingwen Records in 1998. Kuo described 1997 and 1998 as "some of the happiest years of my life".

== Composition, themes, and recording ==
Epic is significantly more prog-oriented than its predecessor. The album features lengthier songs, less surrealistic lyricism, and emphasizes technicality over intensity. The band retained some of its folk influences, notably demonstrated on the title track, which features a guzheng-dominated interlude.

In a 1995 interview compiled on Goodbye Zhang Ju, founding bassist Zhang Ju revealed that Tang Dynasty had written all the material for a second album and were slated to go into the studio in May. Kaiser Kuo disputes this, claiming that Tang Dynasty were "utterly unproductive" between 1992 and 1996, and called the music written in his absence "completely unlistenable". With Kuo now on lead guitar, Tang Dynasty effectively rewrote their second album, retaining a few ideas the guitarist deemed usable. Of these ideas, "The Visitor" remained largely unchanged, as shown by a live recording dating back to May 1994.

The band rerecorded "Your Vision" for Epic. The song features Kuo on lead vocals and is the only song in Tang Dynasty's catalog with English lyrics. Kuo likened his friendship with Ding Wu and Zhang Ju to the brotherhood of Guan Yu, Liu Bei, and Zhang Fei. The song's lyrics were based on a dream Zhang Ju had about the trio remaining friends into old age, reminiscing about old days while watching their grandchildren play.

The song "Farewell" was originally written by Chinese polymath Li Shutong. Like their previous album, a cover song was featured as the album's closer.

The band describes Epic as "a reflection of the modern interpretation of history and the self-reflection of the journey of life". In keeping with Kuo's original vision of the band, the album is heavily influenced by Chinese martial philosophies. The album title itself, Epic (演义 or Yǎnyì in Chinese), is a direct reference to the classic Chinese novel Romance of the Three Kingdoms (三国演义). The title track draws lyrics from key lines in the book, identifying with the heroes of the past and speaks of the duties of a hero. The other members had been exploring Buddhist concepts prior to Kuo's return, which they subsequently incorporated on Epic. Kuo believed this gave the band's music a "kind of Zeppelin-esque mysticism".

The album was produced by Otomo Koetsu, a Japanese producer based in Beijing. Otomo had previously worked for JVC Entertainment, and had produced Black Panther's Nothing Is Nothing. According to Kuo, the recording process was "very indie". Instead of sending off the finished mixes to be mastered separately, the band opted to master the album themselves, but botched the process. The result was a flat-sounding record at very low volume, which subsequently had to be remixed and remastered for release in Taiwan.

== Tracklisting ==
All tracks are written by Tang Dynasty, except where noted.

No.	Title	Lyrics	Music	Length
1.	"演义" (Epic)			9:46
2.	"时间" (Time at My Heels)			7:02
3.	"异乡客" (The Visitor)			11:08
4.	"黑色幽默" (Black Humor)			4:24
5.	"缘生缘灭" (Edge of Life)			8:13
6.	"你的幻境" (Your Vision)	Kaiser Kuo	Kaiser Kuo	4:38
7.	"路桥" (Roads and Bridges)			8:10
8.	"童年" (Childhood)			5:00
9.	"送别" (Farewell)	Li Shutong	Li Shutong, arr. Tang Dynasty	4:34
Total length:				62:55

The Taiwanese edition includes two additional live tracks.

Taiwanese edition bonus tracks
No.	Title	Length
10.	"时间 (现场演唱版)" (Time at My Heels (live))	6:59
11.	"你的幻境 (现场演唱版)" (Your Vision (live))	4:27

== Reception ==
Epic sold around 400,000 copies, with about 80,000 cassette copies alone sold in Beijing within the first five days of its release. "Time at My Heels", the first single off the album, became a Top 10 hit. Tang Dynasty toured intensively leading up to and following the album's release, headlining and selling out concerts throughout China. The reception of the album by the media and the audience, however, was lukewarm, and the album failed to re-established the popularity of the band. Some fans were dissatisfied with Kaiser Kuo's guitar playing, viewing it as poor and even too "American" in comparison to Liu Yijun's virtuosic technique. Kuo himself believed the album's subpar production negatively affected the music, but "[stood] by a lot of the songwriting". On March 1, 2000, the opening track "Epic" was released on an EP, containing six versions of the song including an abridged version, a demo version, and a live version.

Kuo's tenure in Tang Dynasty would not last long. The guitarist left the band in May 1999 following an argument with Ding Wu over the bombing of the Chinese embassy in Belgrade. Kuo also cited frequent clashes with Ding's then-girlfriend in what he called a "Yoko Ono situation" as another impetus to quit. He was briefly replaced by Iron Kite frontman Yu Yang, who would in turn be replaced by guitarist Chen Lei. Kuo would go on to establish a folk metal band called Spring and Autumn (Chinese: 春秋; pinyin: Chūnqiū), which released one album in 2006.

== Personnel ==
Personnel as listed in the album's liner notes are:

=== Tang Dynasty ===
- Ding Wu - lead vocals; guitar
- Kaiser Kuo - guitar; lead vocals on "Your Vision" (uncredited)
- Gu Zhong - bass
- Zhao Nian - drums; percussion

=== Additional musicians ===
- Wang Yong - guzheng and keyboards on "Epic"
- Dou Ying, Wang Yingzi, Jiang Zhu - chorus on "The Visitor", "Your Vision", and "Farewell"

=== Production ===
- Otomo Koetsu - producer
- Awano Keizo - recording; mixing; mastering
- Yan Zhichang, Li Chonglin, Jin Shaogang, Meng Qi - premastering; digital remix (Taiwan version)
