= Yaogun Beijing =

Compilation album series

Yaogun Beijing (摇滚北京 Beijing Rock) is a seminal 1993 Chinese rock compilation album showcasing the first generation Beijing bands. Two further compilations appeared in 1994 and 1996.

== Yaogun Beijing I ==
Yaogun Beijing I

Compilation album by various artists
- Released: 1993
- Genre: Chinese rock

Yaogun Beijing chronology
Yaogun Beijing I (1993)	Yaogun Beijing II (1994)

1. qĭng zŏu rénhángdào. Compass (band)
2. zhè yīkè wŏ shì zhēnxīnde. Compass
3. bù yào cōngmáng. Xīndì yuèduì
4. zìjĭ de tiāntáng. Cobra (Chinese band)
5. ānhún jìnxíngqū. Wang Yong (musician)
6. liănpŭ. Black Panther (band)
7. fēnghu Yángzhōulù. Again (band)
8. xīwàng zhī guāng. Dou Wei's Dream the Dream
9. zŭxiān de yīnyĭng. Overload
10. xīn shìjiè. Breathing (band)

== Yaogun Beijing II ==
Yaogun Beijing II

Compilation album by various artists
- Released: 1994
- Genre: Chinese rock

Yaogun Beijing chronology
Yaogun Beijing I (1993)	Yaogun Beijing II (1994)	Yaogun Beijing III (1996)

1. qílè shìjiè 其乐世界. Zìjué band 自觉乐队
2. wàng shì 往世. Battleaxe 战斧乐队
3. mèng 梦. The Face (band)
4. wēibùzúdào 微不足道. Xuéwèi band 穴位乐队
5. wǒ bù lěi 我不累. The Face
6. bǎ mén dǎkāi 把门打开. Hóngtáo 5 band 红桃5乐队
7. běijīng shízhōng. 北京时钟. Stone band 石头乐队
8. shān gē 山歌. Again (band)
9. měilì de línghún 美丽的灵魂. Wáng Xiùjuān 王秀鹃
10. mò yī mò 抹一抹 Thin Man (band)

== Yaogun Beijing III ==
Yaogun Beijing III

Compilation album by various artists
- Released: 1996
- Genre: Chinese rock

Yaogun Beijing chronology
Yaogun Beijing II (1994)	Yaogun Beijing III (1996)

1. wǎn ān běijīng 晚安 北京 43 Baojia Street 鲍家街43号乐队
2. jiǔ dào 酒道. Ziyue (band)
3. èmèng zài jìxù 恶梦在继续. Míngjiè band 冥界乐队
4. miào 妙. Chén Jìng 陈劲
5. yú 鱼. Móhé band 磨合乐队
6. zhào jìngzǐ 照镜子. Chén Dǐlǐ 陈底里
7. sùshuō yīnguǒ 诉说因果. Chūjiā de lièrén 出家的猎人乐队
8. qīng píng lè 清平乐. Shāng biélí Wèi àidōng 伤别离 魏爱东
9. yīn wèi suǒ yǐ 因为 所以. Zhōu Tóng and Again (band)
