= Liu Yijun (guitarist) =

- Also known as: Lao Wu
- Born: 1962 or 1963; Tianjin, China
- Genres: Progressive metal, folk music, avant-garde music
- Instruments: Guitar, vocals
- Years active: 1986–present
- Website: http://www.tangchaolaowu.com

Liu Yijun (Chinese: 刘义军 or 刘义君; pinyin: Líu Yìjūn), also known as Lao Wu (Chinese: 老五; pinyin: Lǎo Wǔ; lit. "Old Five") is a Chinese musician and artist, best known for his work as the former lead guitarist for seminal Chinese progressive metal band Tang Dynasty. He is often regarded as China's first guitar hero.

== Early life ==
Liu was born in Tianjin, China. Most sources list his birth year as 1962, although one source specifies his birthday as 10 January 1963. "Lao Wu" was the fifth child in the family, and acquired the nickname early in his youth. The family moved to nearby Langfang in 1971, during the Cultural Revolution. Liu's older sister was involved in an arts-and-literature propaganda team; as a result, he grew up surrounded by musical instruments. He studied the erhu for two years during primary school. At the end of 1976, Liu got his first guitar.

Upon failing the cutoff for the gaokao by ten points, Liu realized that music was the only way he could make a living, and threw himself into practicing guitar up to fifteen hours a day. Liu's father, who initially disapproved of his son's career path, changed his mind after witnessing Liu's dedication, and agreed to support him.

Around 1982 or 1983, Liu left Langfang and moved to Beijing, living in a house with fellow musician Liu Junli. There, he continued to practice guitar, working odd jobs to make ends meet. Liu lived in poverty for over four years, surviving on instant noodles and becoming hospitalized on at least one occasion due to malnutrition.

Liu formed a band called White Angel (Chinese: 白天使乐队; pinyin: Bái Tiānshǐ Yuèduì) in 1986 with Zang Tianshuo, Liu Junli, Feng Maintain, and Cheng Jin. The group released one album, Past Rock n' Roll (Chinese: 过去的摇滚; pinyin: Guòqù De Yáogǔn) in 1989, which sold a few hundred copies. White Angel disbanded later that year when Liu Junli left to play bass in Cui Jian's band. Liu briefly played in a group called Shixiao (Chinese: 时效乐队; pinyin: Shíxìao Yuèduì), a band set up to advertise a local travel agency of the same name. Shixiao featured future Tang Dynasty members Gu Zhong and Zhao Nian at various points.

Soon after arriving in Beijing, Liu befriended future Tang Dynasty frontman Ding Wu. Having heard that Ding played guitar, Liu searched all over Beijing on a borrowed bicycle until he tracked down the latter teaching basic art at Beijing's No. 132 Secondary School. This meeting would prove pivotal; after the Tiananmen Square protests forced founding Tang Dynasty guitarist Kaiser Kuo to flee China, Ding Wu invited Liu to replace him.

== Musical career ==
=== 1989-1996: Tang Dynasty ===
Liu joined Tang Dynasty in October 1989. In 1990, the band signed with Magic Stone Records, which launched a multinational marketing campaign to promote the band. Tang Dynasty quickly attracted international attention. In 1992, Spin magazine labeled Liu "hands-down the best guitarist in China" – an assessment often repeated by Chinese rock fans and journalists. The band's self-titled debut album was released internationally in December 1992, and cemented Tang Dynasty's place in history as one of China's most influential rock bands. Liu's "lightning-fast" guitar work was central to the band's sound, which combined Western metal and progressive rock with overt influences from Chinese literary, martial, and musical traditions. Over the next three years, Tang Dynasty toured China, as well as overseas in Germany, Japan, and Hong Kong.

However, Liu eventually became dissatisfied with the band's music, feeling that it was "too Westernized" and "lacked originality". While Tang Dynasty were writing their second album, he stopped playing guitar for about six months, leading his bandmates to think Liu had lost his mind. The death of bassist Zhang Ju in May 1995 dealt a severe blow to the band. Liu subsequently developed personal and artistic conflicts with Ding Wu, who asked him to leave Tang Dynasty in August 1996.

=== 1996-2001: Solo career ===
After leaving Tang Dynasty, Liu remained active as a guitar teacher. His first solo album, 1997's Walking in the Fog (Chinese: 雾中行集; pinyin: Wù Zhōng Xíng Jí), featured appearances from several of his students. The title track and "Dance" (舞) were featured on the compilation China Fire III, released in 1998. Liu released his second solo album, Return Again (Chinese: 再渡归来; pinyin: Zài Dù Guī Lái) in 1999. The music was largely instrumental and folk-oriented. Both albums were released under the moniker "唐朝老五" (pinyin: Tángcháo Lǎo Wǔ; lit. "Tang Dynasty's Old Five"). In 2000, he helped establish the School of Modern Culture and Art (Chinese: 新时空文化艺术学校; pinyin: Xīn Shíkōng Wénhuà Yìshù Xuéxiào), a contemporary music school in Beijing, where he served as principal. Liu formed a solo band which performed sporadically throughout 2001, but disbanded the group at the end of the year.

=== 2002–09: Rejoining Tang Dynasty ===
Liu rejoined Tang Dynasty at the beginning of 2002, sharing lead guitar duties with guitarist Chen Lei. Tang Dynasty's third album, Romantic Knight, was released on 13 June 2008. The album showcased deeper Chinese musical influences than had been on the group's earlier releases. In a 2007 interview with Culture Express, Liu explained that "each member tries to cultivate himself in traditional Chinese culture by reading ancient poetry, playing the guqin, practicing calligraphy, and painting. Without these elements absorbed by the heart and soul, everything would be superficial". The album sold around 50,000 copies within the first three to four months of release.

=== 2009–present: Recent activity ===
On 16 January 2009, Liu announced his second departure from Tang Dynasty due to "personal reasons" and "in cooperation with the idea of music with the band." The same year, he collaborated with Sainkho Namtchylak on an unreleased album.

Liu composed the soundtrack for the 2012 drama film Beijing Flickers (Chinese: 有种; pinyin: Yǒu Zhǒng), directed by Zhang Yuan.

Liu continues to give solo performances under the name "唐朝老五". In 2012, he joined Liu Sola and Friends, a musical collective which combines Chinese folk music with American jazz and blues.

== Painting ==
Liu took up painting around 1992. He works primarily with pencils, ballpoint pens, and ink brushes. In 2015, he opened his first solo exhibit, which contained over thirty paintings dating back as far as 1993. Liu augmented the exhibition by playing a sounding stone during the event. On working within two mediums – art and music – Liu states "I don't belong to rock and roll and I don't belong to art. I belong to my own nature, and I am satisfied if I can mold it into something beautiful."

== Musical style ==
Liu is considered to be one of China's first shredders, and his style was a defining aspect of Tang Dynasty's influential sound. Andrew Jones, in his writeup for Spin, noted that Liu could "wrench new sounds out of his instrument that have the power to shock with their strange beauty", while Black Panther guitarist Li Tong described Liu's playing as "ferocious" and "full of power". A saying among contemporary Chinese rock circles went "the South has Laozai, the North has Laowu" – with "Laozai" referring to Zhejiang-born guitarist Wu Liqun. Liu's early influences include Eddie Van Halen, Steve Vai, Michael Angelo Batio, Yngwie Malmsteen, Queensrÿche, and King Crimson. He has played with Marty Friedman, Paul Gilbert, and Stu Hamm.

As time went on, Liu's playing became increasingly influenced by Chinese folk styles, which can be heard in both Tang Dynasty's music and his own solo compositions. He often employs a technique that involved him strumming with his thumb and index finger while using the remaining three fingers to pluck the strings – an approach similar to hybrid picking. His solo work heavily utilizes the acoustic guitar, on which he often takes a guqin-inspired approach, and incorporates extended techniques such as tapped harmonics and drumming on the guitar's body. Liu was notably one of the first guitarists in China to make use of a seven-string guitar, which can be heard in his solo work. As early as 1992, Liu expressed a desire to "come up with something that goes beyond the boundaries" through reconnecting with Chinese musical traditions. He stated that "[Modern] Chinese culture has never lived up to the tradition because it's been ruined by all the Western influence. We have to get back to our roots...that's what the mission of [Chinese rock] should be about."

== Personal life ==
On 3 July 2004, Liu married Chen Xiaomu, his longtime girlfriend of 11 years.

== Selected discography ==
A full list of Liu's credits can be found here:

=== Tang Dynasty ===
- 1992 – 唐朝 (Tang Dynasty)
- 2008 – 浪漫骑士 (Romantic Knight)

=== Solo (as 唐朝老五) ===
- 1997 – 雾中行集 (Walking in the Fog) – tracks: "舞"; "雾中行"
- 1998 – 再度归来 (Return Again)

=== Other appearances ===
==== With White Angel ====
- 1989 (reissued 1995) – 过去的摇滚 (Past Rock n' Roll)

==== With Zhao Muyang ====
- 1991 – 流浪 (Wandering)

==== With He Yong ====
- 1994 – 垃圾场 (Garbage Dump)

==== With Wang Yong ====
- 1996 – 往生 (Samsara) – tracks: "招魂"

==== Compilations ====
- 1995 – 告别的摇滚 (A Tribute to Teresa Teng) – tracks: "独上西楼"
- 1997 – 再见张炬 (Goodbye Zhang Ju) – tracks: "那一天"; "活在你的梦里"; "我的睫毛都快被吹掉了"; "月梦"; "愛和自由的翅膀－喜馬拉雅之旅"
- 2005 – 礼物 (Gift) – tracks: "礼物"; "春蚕"

=== Soundtracks ===
- 2012 – 有种 (Beijing Flickers)

== See also ==
- Chinese rock
