= Romantic Knight =

Studio album by Tang Dynasty
- Released: June 13, 2008
- Genre: Folk metal, heavy metal
- Length: 70:03
- Label: Jingwen Records
- Producer: Yan Zhongkun

Tang Dynasty chronology
Epic (1998)	Romantic Knight (2008)	Thorn (2013)

Romantic Knight (Chinese: 浪漫骑士; pinyin: Làngmàn Qíshì), alternatively translated as Knight of Romantic, is the third album by Chinese heavy metal band Tang Dynasty, released June 13, 2008 on Jingwen Records. It is the only Tang Dynasty album to feature a five-piece lineup.

== Background ==
Romantic Knight was released almost a full decade after Tang Dynasty's last album, Epic. The group underwent several lineup changes, beginning with the departure of guitarist Kaiser Kuo in May 1999. Kuo was briefly replaced by Iron Kite frontman Yu Yang, who was in turn replaced by Chen Lei in October 2000. At the beginning of 2002, Liu Yijun, lead guitarist on the band's 1992 debut album, rejoined the band. His return transformed Tang Dynasty into a quintet, with Liu and Chen on guitars and frontman Ding Wu on lead vocals and occasional third guitar.

== Composition, themes, and recording ==
Influences from traditional Chinese music and literature are far more prevalent on Romantic Knight than on the group's previous albums. "To keep our own style, we try not merely to imitate or follow Western rock music", Ding told Culture Express in 2007. Liu added that "each member tries to cultivate himself in traditional Chinese culture by reading ancient poetry, playing the guqin, practicing calligraphy, and painting. Without these elements absorbed by the heart and soul, everything would be superficial".

Each track on the album is a story relating the band members' experiences. The title track reflects upon and celebrates the achievements and struggles of the early pioneers of Chinese rock. "Joyful Sorrow" is inspired by Françoise Sagan's 1954 novel Bonjour Tristesse, with the concept of harmony between happiness and sorrow reinterpreted through Ding Wu's eyes.

The album prominently features Chinese musical influences, and often utilizes Chinese instruments themselves. "Drunken Madness" is based on a guqin piece of the same name attributed to poet Ruan Ji. The song opens with piece's main motif played on guitar, and features the Twelve Girls Band, a Chinese folk ensemble. "Pathway" integrates Xinjiang-inspired folk riffs, similar to the band's earlier hit "The Sun".

Similar to their previous work, the band often borrows lyrics from influential Chinese novels and poetry. The album's lead single, "Ritual of Apotheosis", is named for a ritual performed by Chinese emperors during ancient times. The song's lyrics draw from the I Ching, and are about how all individuals must respect and follow the rules of society and nature. "Song of the Great Wind" is a musical setting of three poems: "Reflections on Chang'an" by Song-era poet Kang Yuzhi, "§ Song of Gaixia" by Xiang Yu, and the titular poem by Liu Bang, Emperor Gaozu of Han.

Romantic Knight was recorded over the course of three months. The album was produced by Yan Zhongkun, who had worked on the band's first album as a mixing engineer.

== Tracklisting ==
All tracks are written by Ding Wu, except where noted.

No.	Title	Lyrics	Music	Length
1.	"嚎叫列车" (Screaming Train)			6:12
2.	"快乐的忧愁" (Joyful Sorrow)			6:08
3.	"浪漫骑士" (Romantic Knight)			6:35
4.	"酒狂" (Drunken Madness)			4:49
5.	"路" (Pathway)		Liu Yijun	5:08
6.	"封禅祭" (Ritual of Apotheosis)	Fang Wuxing	Ding Wu, Liu Yijun	6:56
7.	"承诺" (Oath)		Chen Lei	5:20
8.	"追溯" (Retrospect)		Liu Yijun	5:03
9.	"绝望致谎言" (Desperate Lies)			4:44
10.	"大风歌" (Song of the Great Wind)	Kang Yuzhi, Xiang Yu, Liu Bang		6:24
11.	"快乐的 忧愁 (伴奏)" (Joyful Sorrow (instrumental))			6:11
12.	"浪漫骑士 (伴奏)" (Romantic Knight (instrumental))			6:33
Total length:				70:03

== Release ==
Romantic Knight was released on June 13, 2008, and sold 50,000 copies within the first 3–4 months of its release. A collector's edition was also made available for online preorder, which included the album, a bonus DVD containing the five music videos off of Tang Dynasty, a t-shirt, guitar picks, and a mini-poster all contained in a commemorative bag. On the night of the album's release, Tang Dynasty played a benefit concert to raise money for victims of the 2008 Sichuan earthquake, and subsequently embarked on a tour across China, dubbed the "Knight Tour" (Chinese: 骑士之旅; pinyin: Qíshì Zhī Lǚ).

Liu Yijun quit the band for the second time in January 2009, shortly after the album's release, citing "personal reasons", and "in cooperation of the spirit of the band".

== Personnel ==
Personnel as listed in the album's liner notes are:

=== Tang Dynasty ===
- Ding Wu - lead vocals; guitar; guqin (6); xiao (10)
- Liu Yijun - lead guitar; backing vocals (5)
- Chen Lei - lead guitar; backing vocals (7)
- Gu Zhong - bass
- Zhao Nian - drums; percussion; backing vocals (5, 9)

=== Additional musicians ===
- Jin Dapeng - keyboards (1, 2, 10); backing vocals (9); orchestral arrangements (3, 4, 10)
- Chiren (Idiot) Band - backing vocals (2, 6)
- Chinese Opera and Dance Theater Symphony - strings (3)
- Twelve Girls Band - traditional Chinese instruments (4)
- Liu Xiaosong - percussion (5)

=== Production ===
- Yan Zhongkun - production; recording; mixing
- Wang Binghuang - mastering
- Lu Bo - promotion
- Wu Zhen - visual design
- Ding Wu - cover art
