= Ding Wu =

Chinese musician

- Born: December 30, 1962 (age 63); Beijing, China
- Genres: Heavy metal; progressive metal; folk metal; death metal; industrial metal
- Occupations: Singer; musician
- Instruments: Vocals; guitar; xiao; guqin
- Years active: 1984–present

Ding Wu (Chinese: 丁武; pinyin: Dīng Wǔ) (born December 30, 1962) is a Chinese singer and musician, best known for being the lead vocalist and multi instrumentalist of the progressive metal band Tang Dynasty. His distinct falsetto draws influences from Beijing Opera.

== Early life and career ==
Ding Wu was born in on December 30, 1962 in Beijing China. His father was a soldier in the People's Liberation Army, and his mother was a Party cadre. He took up drawing at age 3. In 1968, Ding and his family relocated to Manchuria, moving back to Beijing in 1972. As a result, he did not attend school until he was ten years old.

Ding developed an interest in Beijing Opera at around age 8, and picked up the guitar in 1976. He was admitted to the Beijing School of Arts and Crafts in 1978, where he was first exposed to rock music, and formed his first bands with his peers. Upon graduating in 1982 with a degree in fine arts, Ding took a job teaching basic art at Beijing's No. 132 Secondary School. However, he resigned the following year after the school demanded he cut his hair. It was during this time that Ding began to seriously pursue a musical career, spending most of his income on musical equipment and guitar textbooks.

In 1984, Ding founded a band called Budaoweng (Chinese: 不倒瓮; pinyin: Bùdǎowēng; lit. 'roly-poly toy'). This short-lived band primarily played covers of Western and Japanese rock songs, and featured many musicians who would later become significant figures in the early Chinese rock scene. In 1987, Ding founded hard rock/glam metal band Black Panther (黑豹; Hēibào) and served as the group's lead vocalist through 1988, eventually quitting because the band did not provide a sufficient outlet for his artistic expression. Black Panther would release their eponymous debut album in 1991, featuring the influential Dou Wei on lead vocals.

== Tang Dynasty (1988-present) ==
Ding Wu was still in Black Panther when he was introduced to Americans Kaiser Kuo and Sean Andrews in autumn 1988. Kuo had been eager to start a distinctly Chinese-sounding metal band, and noticed Ding's potential as a frontman. After several months of planning, Tang Dynasty was formally established in February 1989, with Ding and Kuo on guitars, Zhang Ju on bass, and Andrew Szabo on drums. This lineup lasted until June 1989, when the Tiananmen Square protests forced Kuo and Szabo out of the country. With the band on hiatus, Ding Wu subsequently backpacked to Xinjiang for a few months. The journey inspired him to write what would eventually become one of Tang Dynasty's most famous songs, "The Sun".

In October 1989, Ding Wu returned to Beijing with the intent of continuing the band. Together with Zhang Ju, the pair recruited drummer Zhao Nian and guitarist Liu Yijun. The band signed with Magic Stone Records in May 1990. Tang Dynasty, released in December 1992, was an unprecedented success, selling 900,000 legal copies, and is considered to be China's first heavy metal record. Tang Dynasty toured internationally over the next few years, playing in Germany, Japan, and Hong Kong. During this time, Ding and Zhang both developed serious heroin addictions. In 1995, the band suffered a severe blow when Zhang was killed in a motorcycle accident. Ding contributed two tracks to the 1997 tribute album Goodbye Zhang Ju, and Tang Dynasty soldiered on with Gu Zhong taking over bass duties. Founding guitarist Kaiser Kuo returned to replace Liu, who quit the band in August 1996 over conflicts with Ding over musical direction. Ding eventually kicked his addiction and Tang Dynasty subsequently released their second album, Epic, on Jingwen Records in December 1998.

In May 1999, Kaiser left Tang Dynasty following an argument with Ding over the United States bombing of the Chinese embassy in Belgrade. He was subsequently replaced by Iron Kite frontman Yu Yang, who was in turn replaced by young guitar virtuoso Chen Lei. In 2002, Liu Yijun rejoined the band. The band's third album, Romantic Knight, was not released until June 2008. After Liu left again in January 2009, Tang Dynasty continued as a four-piece. Their fourth album, Thorn, was released in November 2013, and was a radical departure from the band's usual folk-based sound. In 2014 the band toured internationally in New Zealand, Fiji, and Algeria. Tang Dynasty continues to tour and perform in China.

He is the band's only remaining original member.

== Solo career (2018-present) ==
In late 2018, Ding announced a solo album entitled One Moment (Chinese: 一念; pinyin: Yī Niàn). The album explores his dual identities as a musician and visual artist, and delves into death and industrial metal. On October 18, the track "Two Sides" (Chinese: 二面; pinyin: Èr Miàn), was released on QQ Music. A second track, "Three Words" (Chinese: 三言; pinyin: Sān Yán), was released on November 9. On November 22, Ding released the audio and accompanying music video for the title track. One Moment was released on December 5, 2018. This was accompanied by several national tours throughout 2019.

Ding released his second solo album What (Chinese: 什么; pinyin: Shénme) on December 6, 2021. Music videos for the title track and "Black Hole" (Chinese: 黑洞; pinyin: Hēidòng) were released ahead of time on November 15.

=== Personnel ===
- Ding Wu – lead vocals, rhythm guitar (2018-present)
- Liu Jingwei – lead guitar (2018-present)
- Wei Kun – bass guitar (2018-present)
- Shen Zijun – drums (2018-present)

== Other work ==
Outside of Tang Dynasty, Ding Wu continues to paint, and has held exhibitions in both China and Japan.

Ding Wu made a cameo appearance in the 2015 crime drama Mr. Six (Chinese: 老炮儿; pinyin: Lǎo Pàoér, lit. "Old Cannon"), directed by Guan Hu.

In April 2016, Ding appeared on the Season 4 finale of I Am a Singer, joining fellow rock musicians Gao Qi, Wang Feng, Li Lianyang, Luan Shu, Ma Shangyou, Zhou Xiaoou, and Chen Jin for a performance of the song "Gift", a song written in 2005 to commemorate the passing of Tang Dynasty bassist Zhang Ju.

As of 2016, Ding Wu is endorsed by Orange amplifiers.

== Personal life ==
Ding Wu currently lives in Beijing with his wife, Yang Ting (Chinese: 杨婷; pinyin: Yáng Tíng), who he met in 2003 and married in 2006. Their daughter was born in 2011. Ding and his daughter were featured in a short 2016 biopic called "Ding Wu's Choice" (Chinese: 丁武的选择; pinyin: Dīng Wǔ de Xuǎnzé).

== Discography ==
=== With Tang Dynasty ===
==== Studio albums ====
- 1992 – 唐朝 (Tang Dynasty)
- 1998 – 演义 (Epic)
- 2008 – 浪漫骑士 (Romantic Knight)
- 2013 – 芒刺 (Thorn)

==== Live albums ====
- 1990 – 90现代音乐会 ('90 Modern Music Concert) – "谁都希望", "粉雾"
- 1994 – 摇滚中国乐势力 (Chinese Rock Forces: Live in Hong Kong) – "飞翔鸟", "选择"

==== EPs ====
- 2010 – 沉浮 (Ups and Downs)

==== Compilations ====
- 1995 – 告别的摇滚 (A Tribute to Teresa Teng) – "独上西楼"
- 1997 – 再见张炬 (Goodbye Zhang Ju) – "月梦"
- 2005 – 礼物 (Gift) – "礼物", "春蚕"

=== Solo ===
- 1997 – "活在你的梦里" ("Living in Your Dream") – on Goodbye Zhang Ju
- 2018 – 一念 (One Moment)
