= A Tribute to Teresa Teng =

Studio album by Various artists
- Released: July 1, 1995
- Genres: Rock, pop
- Length: 43:25
- Label: Bamboo Book Culture
- Producer: Koetsu Otomo

A Tribute to Teresa Teng - A Rocking Farewell (告别的摇滚) is a tribute album released in July 1995 on Beijing-based label Bamboo Book Culture (竹书文化), shortly after Teresa Teng's death on May 8, 1995. It features ten of Teng's songs covered by several of Beijing's most well-known first-generation rock bands. The album is a sincere tribute to Teng as one of the first pop singers to be heard in China.

== Track listing ==
#	Title	Unofficial English translation	Artist(s)	Length	Notes
1	在水一方	Across the Water	Again	5:19	Song from the 1975 Chinese film of the same name.
2	船歌	Boat Song	Zheng Jun	4:12	Indonesian folk song. Chinese lyrics by Zhuang Nu.
3	再见！我的爱人	Goodbye, My Love	Zang Tianshuo and 1989	5:16	
4	酒醉的探戈	Drunken Tango	Again	5:15	
5	爱的箴言	Maxims of Love	Black Panther	4:11	
6	路边的野花不要采	Do Not Pick the Roadside Flowers	Zang Tianshuo and 1989	2:02	
7	独上西楼	Ascending the West Tower Alone	Members of Tang Dynasty	4:31	Tang Dynasty bassist Zhang Ju was killed in a motorcycle accident three days after Teng's death.
8	甜蜜蜜	Sweet as Honey	Zheng Jun	4:07	
9	爱人	Lover	Black Panther	3:00	
10	夜色	The Color of the Night	Beijing Rock All-Stars	5:32	

== Personnel ==
Personnel as listed in the album's liner notes are:

=== Musicians ===
- Wu Tong - vocals (tracks 1, 4, 10); percussion (track 4), woodwinds (track 4)
- Zheng Jun - vocals (tracks 2, 8, 10)
- Zang Tianshuo - vocals, keyboards (tracks 3, 6)
- Qin Yong - vocals (tracks 5, 9, 10)
- Guo Dawei - vocals (track 7); chorus (track 10)
- Li Qiang - guitar (tracks 1, 4)
- Zhao Wei - guitar (tracks 1, 4); percussion (track 4)
- Zhu Hongmao - guitar (tracks 2, 8)
- Qin Qi - guitar (tracks 3, 6)
- Li Tong - guitar (5, 9); background vocals (track 9); chorus (track 10)
- Ding Wu - guitar (tracks 7, 10)
- Liu Yijun - guitar (tracks 7, 10); chorus (track 10)
- Zhou Xu - upright bass (track 1); electric bass (track 4)
- Chen Jin - bass (tracks 2, 7, 8, 10); chorus (track 10)
- Liu Wentai - bass (tracks 3, 6)
- Wang Wenjie - bass (tracks 5, 9)
- Feng Jun - drums (tracks 1, 4)
- Cheng Jin - drums (tracks 2, 8)
- Ma He - drums (tracks 3, 6)
- Zhao Mingyi - drums (tracks 5, 9); chorus (track 10)
- Zhao Nian - drums (tracks 7, 10); chorus (track 10)
- Luan Shu - keyboards (track 7)
- Feng Xiaobao - keyboards (5, 9); background vocals (track 9)
- Liu Xiaosong - percussion (tracks 3, 6)
- Zhang Yongguang - percussion (track 7)
- Dai Bing - background vocals (tracks 3, 6)
- Xu Tian - background vocals (track 6)
- Hu Zhiliang - saxophone (tracks 3, 6); background vocals (track 6)

=== Production ===
- Koetsu Otomo - producer
- Shigeo Miyamoto - recording, mixing
- Bobby Hata - mastering
