= Heibao =

Heibao may refer to:

- Heibao (band), or Black Panther, a seminal Chinese rock band founded in 1987
- Heibao (album), 1992 debut album of the band Heibao
- Heibao (company), a Chinese automotive manufacturing company based in Weihai, Shandong
