= Light in Extension =

Compilation album by Divination
- Released: January 1994
- Studio: Greenpoint Studio, Brooklyn, NY
- Genre: Ambient dub
- Length: 133:02
- Label: 4th & B'way
- Producer: Bill Laswell

Divination chronology
| Ambient Dub Volume II: Dead Slow (1993) | Light in Extension (1994) | Akasha (1995) |

Bill Laswell chronology
| Ambient Dub Volume II: Dead Slow (1993) | Light in Extension (1994) | Outland (1994) |

Light in Extension is a compilation album by American composer Bill Laswell, issued under the moniker Divination. Released in January 1994 by 4th & B'way Records, it comprises Vol. 1 and Vol. 2 of the Ambient Dub series in addition to two previously unreleased pieces.

== Track listing ==
Disc one (Vol. I)
| No. | Title | Writer(s) | Length |
|---|---|---|---|
| 1. | "Divination One" | Laswell | 3:42 |
| 2. | "Seven Heavens" | Laswell | 12:16 |
| 3. | "Erratta" | Laswell | 4:20 |
| 4. | "Delta" | Musso | 5:53 |
| 5. | "Tian Zhen" | Sola | 4:20 |
| 6. | "Agrippa" | Laswell | 6:50 |
| 7. | "Godspeed" | Laswell | 8:20 |
| 8. | "Ain Soph Aour" | Laswell | 5:48 |
| 9. | "Najm-Al-Din" (previously unreleased) | Laswell | 9:05 |

Disc two (Vol. II)
| No. | Title | Writer(s) | Length |
|---|---|---|---|
| 1. | "Dead Slow" | Laswell | 4:05 |
| 2. | "Baraka" | Laswell | 15:08 |
| 3. | "Silent Fields" | Laswell | 4:05 |
| 4. | "Evil Eye" | Laswell | 14:28 |
| 5. | "Dream Light" | Laswell | 9:59 |
| 6. | "Journeys" | Harris | 13:31 |
| 7. | "The Last Words of Hassan I Sabbath" (previously unreleased) | Laswell | 10:30 |

== Personnel ==
Adapted from the Light in Extension liner notes.

- Jeff Bova – instruments (Vol. I & II)
- Buckethead – instruments (Vol. I)
- Mick Harris – instruments (Vol. II)
- Bill Laswell – instruments and producer (Vol. I & II)
- Robert Musso – instruments (Vol. I & II)
- Nicky Skopelitis – instruments (Vol. I)
- Liu Sola – instruments (Vol. I)
- Jah Wobble – instruments (Vol. II)
- Howie Weinberg – mastering

== Release history ==
| Region | Date | Label | Format | Catalog |
|---|---|---|---|---|
| United States | 1994 | 4th & B'way | CD | 522 625-2 |
