= Tang Dynasty (album) =

Studio album by Tang Dynasty
- Released: December 1991 (China); December 11, 1992 (international)
- Recorded: September–October 1991
- Studio: China National Radio headquarters, Beijing, China
- Genre: Progressive metal, heavy metal, folk metal
- Length: 55:41
- Label: Magic Stone
- Producer: Jeff Chia

Tang Dynasty chronology
Tang Dynasty (1991)	Epic (1998)

Music video
- "A Dream Return to Tang Dynasty" on YouTube "The Sun" on YouTube "Nine Rhythm" on YouTube "Choice" on YouTube "The Moon Hangs High" on YouTube

Tang Dynasty (Chinese: 唐朝; pinyin: Tángcháo), also known as A Dream Return to Tang Dynasty (Chinese: 梦回唐朝; pinyin: Mènghuí Tángcháo) is the debut studio album by Chinese heavy metal band Tang Dynasty, released in China in December 1991 and internationally on December 11, 1992 by Magic Stone Records. The album is lauded as the first Chinese metal album, combining heavy metal and progressive rock with traditional Chinese folk styles, poetry, and Beijing opera vocal techniques.

== Background ==
Tang Dynasty was officially formed in February 1989 by Americans Kaiser Kuo (guitar) and Andrew Szabo (drums), along with Beijing musicians Ding Wu (guitar) and Zhang Ju (bass). However, the Tiananmen Square Protests forced Kuo and Szabo to leave China. The band went on hiatus, and Ding Wu moved to Xinjiang for several months. In October, Ding Wu returned to Beijing, and together with Zhang Ju recruited "lightning-fast" guitarist Liu Yijun and drummer Zhao Nian. On May 1, 1990, the new lineup participated in a fundraising concert for the 1990 Asian Games, playing in front of 100,000 people at the Workers' Stadium. The success of the concert led the band to be signed by Magic Stone Records (Chinese: 魔石唱片; pinyin: Móshí Chàngpīan), the fledgling mainland division of Taiwan-based label Rock Records (Chinese: 滚石唱片; pinyin: Gŭnshí Chàngpīan, lit. "Rolling Stone Records") specializing in Chinese rock acts.

== Recording and release ==
Recording took place in the second floor studio of the China National Radio headquarters in Xicheng, over a 44-day period, from September through October 1991. Founding guitarist Kaiser Kuo briefly returned in May to record some demos with the band, but left again for the United States before sessions formally began in order to complete graduate school. Bassist Zhang Ju had also been singing lead since Kuo's departure, but Kuo insisted that Ding Wu be designated lead vocalist instead, thereby cementing Ding's position as Tang Dynasty's frontman. According to Ding Wu, a significant portion of the songs' melodies were not established until recording was underway, although he later clarified that the band had completed most of the instrumentals before entering the studio.

The album was engineered by Wang "Lao Ge (Chinese: 老哥; lit. 'Old Brother')" Xinbo (Chinese: 王昕波), who had worked on Cui Jian's Rock 'n' Roll on the New Long March and Black Panther's debut album. It was also the first album by a mainland Chinese band to be produced by Jeff Chia (Chinese: 贾敏恕; pinyin: Jiǎ Mǐnshù), who would go on to record other notable Beijing artists for the Magic Stone label. Chia recalled the making of Tang Dynasty as an intensive, around-the-clock process, and that an armed guard was stationed outside the studio as they worked. Despite having never worked with a rock band before, Chia noted the ease with which he and the band members could communicate musical ideas, which streamlined the otherwise stressful undertaking.

Tang Dynasty was released domestically in December 1991. Magic Stone Records spent the next year launching a massive overseas marketing campaign, securing the band a following in Hong Kong, Taiwan, and Singapore. Five high-budget music videos for "A Dream Return to Tang Dynasty", "The Sun", "Nine Rhythm", "Choice", and "Moon Dreams" were shot and released. As Kuo noted, "Nothing like that had ever been done for a Chinese band."

The international version was released on December 11, 1992 in Taiwan, Hong Kong, Japan, South Korea, and Southeast Asia.

== Composition ==
"We're...getting deeper and deeper into our own traditions. Rock is based on blues, and blues isn't in our blood. We can imitate it, we can play it, but eventually we'll have to go back to...traditional Chinese folk music - folk music from all over China - and then come up with something that goes beyond the boundaries."

— Liu Yijun, Spin, Oct. 1992

Numerous and eclectic influences can be heard on Tang Dynasty. Frontman Ding Wu was a founding member of seminal Chinese bands Budaoweng and Black Panther, while Kaiser Kuo introduced the band to progressive rock acts such as Rush, Genesis, and King Crimson. Early on, the band strived to create music that was distinctly and authentically Chinese, even while working within a Western musical idiom. Kuo justified this approach by pointing out that in addition to being considered the pinnacle of Chinese civilization, Tang-era China - for which the band was named - was decidedly cosmopolitan and open to other cultures and ideas.

"A Dream Return to Tang Dynasty" begins with some textural Chinese instrumentation before transitioning into a powerful introduction. Ding Wu's high-pitched vocal delivery, drawing influences from Beijing Opera, can be heard on the song's bridge, which features lyrics drawn from works by poets Du Fu and Fang Gan. "The Sun" is built around a modal riff heavily reminiscent of Xinjiangnese folk music, augmented by Middle Eastern percussion and ethereal backing vocals, before going into an anthemic half-time chorus. "The Moon Hangs High" is a gentle ballad that features prominent acoustic guitar and Chinese woodwinds. These songs coexist alongside more Western-sounding heavy metal songs such as "Paradise", "Dream of the Doomsday" and "Don't Go Hiding".

Progressive elements are prevalent throughout the album. "Nine Rhythm" is named for the time signature on the song's verses, and begins with a guitar introduction in 13/8 time. The band makes heavy use of harmonic modulation, as heard on tracks such as "Choice", "Soaring Bird", and "Legend". Several tracks feature multiple guitar solos, played by both Liu Yijun and Ding Wu.

The band's cover of the Internationale was a last-minute addition by Kuo while they were recording demos in July 1991. The song had been omitted from the domestic tracklisting for political reasons, but was later included on the international version as well as on subsequent reissues.

Lyrically and thematically, the band was heavily inspired by ancient Chinese martial traditions, via classic Chinese novels such as Romance of the Three Kingdoms, and wuxia films. Kuo characterized Tang China as "period of high heroics", stating that it worked well in the context of metal music. The band wrote its lyrics in a voice reminiscent of classic Chinese poetry, going as far as to incorporate actual lines from Tang-era poems. Scholar Cynthia Wong noted that the band's poetic lyricism juxtaposed with loud, aggressive musicianship was consistent with the ancient Chinese concepts of wén (文; intellect) and wŭ (武; martial ability) respectively, and how "ideal men" were expected to possess a balance of the two. The characterization of the band members as "warrior-poets" was furthered by the album cover, the accompanying music videos, and Magic Stone's press release emphasizing the "self-confidence of the Chinese".

== Reception and legacy ==
Tang Dynasty is generally cited as China's first heavy metal album. It was "an unprecedented success" upon its release. As Kaiser Kuo recalled, the album "went absolutely crazy" by 1993, despite not receiving radio play and became a bestseller in Taiwan. Total recorded sales vary from source to source, ranging from 900,000 to over 2 million legal copies, with countless other pirated versions. Liu Yijun was labeled "hands-down the best guitarist in China" by Spin, and subsequently became China's first guitar hero. "A Dream Return to Tang Dynasty" received some minor airplay outside of China, and its accompanying music video was nominated for MTV Asia's International Viewers Choice Awards in 1993. Following Tang Dynasty’s lead, numerous Chinese metal bands, such as Overload and Tomahawk, were established, and the Chinese metal scene diverged into various subgenres as the decade progressed. Zhang Fan, president of Beijing's Midi School of Music, revealed in the 2007 documentary Global Metal that "80% of Chinese youth came to know metal music by listening to Tang Dynasty."

Tang Dynasty was noted for its glorification of ancient China. Author Facai Guo noted the album's successful fusion of "tradition and reality", and declared the band to be the "insurrectionist of Chinese contemporary culture”. Indeed, many saw Tang Dynasty's music as a reaction to both the polished, commercial sound of Hong Kong pop (gangtai), and the simple, strophic revolutionary songs pushed by the Communist Party. Critic Zai Dao praised the band, saying "They express in their own way a longing for a strong and influential China: a return to Tang Dynasty." Beijing-based journalist Stephen Schwankert, speaking of the album, observed that "Tang Dynasty produced music that looked and sounded like what Chinese people thought rock should be."

Although Tang Dynasty was slated for a follow-up release in 1995, internal problems culminating with Zhang's death in a motorcycle accident on May 11 and Liu's subsequent departure the following year put the band on an indefinite hiatus. The band's second album, Epic, would not be released until 1998.

== Tracklisting ==
All tracks are written by Tang Dynasty, except where noted.

No.	Title	Lyrics	Music	Length
1.	"梦回唐朝" (A Dream Return to Tang Dynasty)	Yang Jun		7:03
2.	"太阳" (The Sun)			5:52
3.	"九拍" (Nine Rhythm)			6:35
4.	"天堂" (Paradise)			4:21
5.	"选择" (Choice)			5:46
6.	"飞翔鸟" (Soaring Bird)			7:04
7.	"世纪末之梦" (Dream of the Doomsday)			4:55
8.	"月梦" (The Moon Hangs High)			4:47
9.	"不要逃避" (Don't Go Hiding)		Kaiser Kuo	4:31
10.	"传说" (Legend)			4:47
Total length:				55:41

International Edition
No.	Title	Lyrics	Music	Length
11.	"国际歌" (The Internationale)	Eugène Pottier (original lyrics), Qu Qiubai (Chinese lyrics)	Pierre De Geyter, arr. Kaiser Kuo	4:27

In late 2008, Beijing-based label Jingwen Records reissued the album, including "The Internationale" as well as a DVD containing the five music videos off the album.

2008 Jingwen Records bonus DVD
No.	Title	Length
1.	"梦回唐朝" (A Dream Return to Tang Dynasty)	7:02
2.	"九拍" (Nine Rhythm)	6:42
3.	"选择" (Choice)	6:01
4.	"月梦" (The Moon Hangs High)	4:45
5.	"太阳" (The Sun)	5:51

== Personnel ==
Personnel as listed in the album's liner notes are:

Tang Dynasty

- Ding Wu - lead vocals; guitar
- Liu Yijun - guitar
- Zhang Ju - bass; backing vocals; lead vocals on "Legend"; co-lead vocals on "The Internationale"
- Zhao Nian - drums

Additional musicians

- Qin Qi - lead vocals on "Dream of the Doomsday"
- Luan Shu - additional background vocals
- Chen Rouzheng - keyboards
- Wubrick Kasam - additional percussion on "The Sun"
- Beijing Central People's Choir - choir on "The Internationale"

Production

- Jeff Chia - production; additional arrangements
- Landy Chang - supervision
- Wang Xinbo - engineer
- Paul Yan - mixing
- Bernie Grundman - mastering

== See also ==
- Chinese rock
- Chinese heavy metal
