= Tang dynasty (disambiguation) =

Tang dynasty (618–907) was an imperial dynasty in early medieval China.

Tang dynasty may also refer to:

- Tang Dynasty (band), a Chinese rock band founded in 1988
  - Tang Dynasty (album), their 1992 debut album
- Later Tang (923–937), a northern state during imperial China's Five Dynasties and Ten Kingdoms period
- Southern Tang (937–975), a southern state during imperial China's Five Dynasties and Ten Kingdoms period

== See also ==
- New Tang Dynasty Television, a television broadcaster based in New York City since 2001
- Tang (disambiguation)
