= China Fire =

Chinese compilation album series

China Fire (Chinese: 中国火; pinyin: Zhōngguó Huǒ) was a series of three Chinese rock music samplers compiled primarily from Beijing artists. These albums were issued by Taiwan-based label Rock Records during the early stages of Chinese rock in the 1990s. Many of the featured songs appeared on albums by their respective creators, while other groups and their songs never made it past the sampler.

== China Fire I ==
China Fire I

Compilation album by Various artists
- Released: December 22, 1992
- Genre: Rock
- Label: Rock Records

Various artists chronology
China Fire I (1992)	China Fire II (1996)

#	Title	Unofficial English translation	Artist	Notes
1	姐姐	Sister	Zhang Chu	
2	给我一点爱	Give Me Some Love	The Face	
3	我不能随便说	I Can't Say It Casually	ADO	
4	永久的等你	Forever Waiting for You	Zhao Gang	Track recorded by Shenyang-based band Witness but credited under Zhao's name.
5	Searchin' for Your Life		Anodized	Hong Kong band.
6	累	Tired	Red Army	Disbanded in 1992.
7	别去糟蹋	Don't Go to Waste	Black Panther	
8	擦去眼泪	Wipe Your Tears Away	Self-Education	
9	飞翔鸟	Soaring Bird	Tang Dynasty	

== China Fire II ==
China Fire II

Compilation album by Various artists
- Released: August 1996
- Genre: Rock
- Label: Rock Records

Various artists chronology
China Fire I (1992)	China Fire II (1996)	China Fire III (1998)

#	Title	Unofficial English translation	Artist	Notes
1	都一样	All the Same	Underbaby	
2	主	Master	Dou Wei	
3	这个夏天	This Summer	Iron Kite	
4	认识了	Familiarized	Zhang Chu	
5	1999年8月10日	August 10, 1999	Fang Ke	
6	火星人	Martian	Zhou Ren	
7	金色的眼睛	Golden Eyes	Die Young	
8	三儿的问题	The Question of Three	Frontier	
9	招魂	Spiritualism	Wang Yong	
10	破碎	Shattered	Overload	

== China Fire III ==
China Fire III

Compilation album by Various artists
- Released: October 1998
- Genre: Rock
- Label: Rock Records

Various artists chronology
China Fire II (1996)	China Fire III (1998)

#	Title	Unofficial English translation	Artist	Notes
1	雾中行	Walking in the Fog	Liu Yijun	Credited as "Tang Dynasty's Old Five" (唐朝老五).
2	不要告别	Don't Say Goodbye	Overload	
3	大庙	Temple	Dou Wei	
4	种子	Seed	Underbaby	
5	风, 马, 牛	Wind, Horse, Ox	Zhou Ren	
6	觉醒	Awaken	Underbaby	
7	这么大	So Large	Zhang Chu	
8	进化之日	Evolution Day	Iron Kite	
9	舞	Dance	Liu Yijun	Same credit as track 1.
10	放学啦!	School's Out	The Flowers	Demo version. First release from the band.
