= Liu Yijun =

Liu Yijun is the name of:

- Liu Yijun (guitarist) (born 1962), Chinese heavy metal guitarist and former member of the band Tang Dynasty
- Liu Yijun (actor) (born 1970), Chinese actor
