= Thorn (album) =

Studio album by Tang Dynasty
- Released: November 7, 2013 (Hong Kong, Taiwan, Malaysia); November 8, 2013 (China)
- Genre: Progressive metal
- Length: 54:24
- Label: Starsing Records
- Producer: Ding Wu

Tang Dynasty chronology
Romantic Knight (2008)	Thorn (2013)

Singles from Thorn
- 1. "Thorn" Released: September 2013; 2. "Zebra Crossing" Released: September 2013

Music video
- "Thorn" on YouTube "Zebra Crossing" on YouTube

Thorn (Chinese: 芒刺; pinyin: Mángcì) is the fourth studio album by seminal Chinese progressive metal band Tang Dynasty, released on November 8, 2013.

== Composition, themes, and recording ==
The album title comes from a Book of Han proverb "Thorn on one's back" (Chinese: 芒刺在背; pinyin: máng cì zài bèi), referring to a constant feeling of anxiety or unease. The band believed this idiom reflected both their own feelings during the album's creation, as well as the situation of every Chinese person alive in the modern world. The album's unifying concepts were world peace and environmental preservation; many of the song titles contain references to animals or plants.

Thorn took almost three years to record, with frontman Ding Wu overseeing every aspect of recording and production. Ding explained the band's decision to produce the album independently, saying "today's recording industry as a whole is not thriving. Traditional recording practices are completely obsolete, and record labels do not accommodate the artist anymore[...]we have been considering going independent since completing Romantic Knight. By self-producing this album we have cut out the middleman entirely, which results in a product closer to our artistic vision." He revealed that each member had installed home studios from which they could record, share, and edit musical ideas. Award-winning engineer Li Jun was hired to mix the album. The album was handed over to Sony Music Japan for mastering, and was released on patented Memory-Tech HQCD to ensure top quality.

Thorn is a radical departure from the band's folk-influenced sound, featuring drop-tuned guitars, unconventional song structures, and the incorporation of electronic music and field recordings. Two songs, "Ups and Downs" and "Elk Tears", which had been previously released on a 2010 EP entitled Ups and Downs sold exclusively at concerts, were rerecorded for the album. The artwork was created by Song Xiaohui, who had previously designed the artwork for the band's second album, Epic.

== Release ==
Thorn was distributed by Guangzhou-based label Starsing Records. Music videos for the title track and "Zebra Crossing" were released online in September 2013. The album was made available to preorder on October 21, 2013 (preorder editions included a poster and a miner's lamp). The album was released in Hong Kong, Taiwan, and Malaysia a day in advance. On the night of the album's mainland release, Tang Dynasty played a concert - dubbed the "Sun/Thorn Concert" (Chinese: 太阳芒刺音乐会; pinyin: Tàiyáng Mángcì Yīnyuè Huì) - at the Exhibition Theater in Beijing, featuring punk band Brain Failure and Chinese Idol runner-up Yang Jima as guests.

In early 2014 the group embarked on a short tour of Oceania, playing concerts in New Zealand and Fiji, marking the first time it had played outside of China in nearly twenty years. Later that year, Tang Dynasty toured Africa and Asia.

On September 15, 2015, the album was reissued on vinyl, with preorders made available five days before.

== Tracklisting ==
All tracks are written by Tang Dynasty.

No.	Title	Length
1.	"芒刺" (Thorn)	5:08
2.	"斑马线" (Zebra Crossing)	6:16
3.	"麋鹿的眼泪" (Elk Tears)	4:41
4.	"睡莲" (Water Lilies)	8:15
5.	"大象不抱怨" (Elephants Do Not Complain)	5:08
6.	"梅花赐" (Plum Gift)	4:05
7.	"紫叶" (Purple Leaf)	5:09
8.	"沉浮" (Ups and Downs)	5:57
9.	"响尾蛇" (Rattlesnake)	2:05
10.	"异乡客·岚池" (The Visitor · Mist Pool)	7:44
Total length:		54:24

== Personnel ==
=== Tang Dynasty ===
- Ding Wu - lead vocals; guitar; additional instruments
- Chen Lei - guitar
- Gu Zhong - bass
- Zhao Nian - drums

=== Production ===
- Ding Wu - production
- Li Jun - mixing
- Sony Music Japan - mastering
- Song Xiaohui - album artwork
