= He Yong (rock musician) =

Chinese singer and musician (1969–2026)

He Yong 何勇
- Born: 15 February 1969; Beijing, China
- Died: 1 September 2026 (aged 57) Beijing, China
- Genres: Alternative rock, post-rock, ambient, folk, electronic, Chinese rock
- Occupations: Singer-songwriter, musician, composer, poet
- Instrument: Guitar
- Years active: 1987–2026

He Yong (15 February 1969 – 1 September 2026) was a Chinese rock musician, who was particularly active in the 1980s and 1990s. A self-styled punk, He Yong's lyrics and outspoken nature have made him controversial in mainland China and Hong Kong. His only album, Garbage Dump, exemplified his negative, though often nostalgic perspective toward life. He is regarded as one of the pioneers of Chinese rock.

== Life and career ==
From the age of six He Yong began learning music from his father He Yusheng (何玉声), a professional sanxian (three-string snakeskin banjo) player. In 1980, he appeared in the children's movie Four Little Friends (四个小伙伴). He Yong began playing the guitar when he was fifteen and joined the band Mayday (五月天) in 1987. The group gave a much publicised performance for the students of the Tiananmen protests in 1989. Around this time He Yong was active in the underground rock movement and met a number of other musicians, including Cui Jian and Dou Wei.

He reached the height of his fame in May 1994, when he released Garbage Dump. The fatalistic "Garbage Dump", written at the height of the Tiananmen protests, is the most well-known song of the album. It features repeated guitar riffs, explosive pounding of drums, culminating in the repeated primal screams of the phrase "Is there any hope?" (有没有希望?). Other songs on the album, however, such as "Pretty Girl" and "Drum and Bell Tower"《钟鼓楼》, explore issues including materialism, environmentalism, gender issues and heritage conservation. Around this time He Yong became known as one of the "Three prominents of Moyan" (魔岩三杰) along with Dou Wei and Zhang Chu, after their record company Moyan Culture (魔岩文化). His "Bell and Drum Towers", a nostalgic remembrance of life in the old quarter of Beijing, appeared on the soundtrack of the Zhang Yuan movie Beijing Bastards (1993).

On 17 December 1994, He Yong performed at a groundbreaking concert in Hong Kong with Chinese metal-prog rock harbingers Tang Dynasty and others. Interviewed before the concert, he was antagonistically critical of Cantopop music, saying: "Hong Kong only has entertainment, it has no music. Out of the "Four Heavenly Kings" only Zhang Xueyou (Jacky Cheung) can be considered a singer, the rest are all clowns". In response Jacky Cheung is said to have retorted: "Mainland musicians all live in caves."

The death of Tang Dynasty bass guitarist Zhang Ju (张炬), one of He Yong's best friends, on 11 May 1995 affected him in a terrible way. He Yong fell out over a record deal and sank into depression and alcoholism. In 1999, He Yong spent three months in France and the Netherlands, playing and recording music. Following his first album, He Yong never again produced new material, which prompted one Chinese newspaper to question: "He Yong, do you still have energy to rock?".

He Yong gave isolated performances in Beijing clubs from the time of the 1994 Hong Kong concert on, but performed few large concerts. In 2002, he attempted to set himself alight in his Beijing apartment and was subsequently incarcerated and then was receiving medical treatment. Between 6–8 August 2004, he attended a concert entitled the "Glorious Road of Chinese Rock" (中国摇滚的光辉道路) held near the Helan Mountains (贺兰山) in Ningxia. Accompanied by his father and band, He Yong again performed beside the veterans of Chinese rock. He Yong hinted that the concert signaled his re-emergence into the Chinese music scene

He Yong died on 1 September 2026, at the age of 57.

== Discography ==
- 1994 – Lajichang Garbage Dump

== See also ==
- C-Rock/Sino-Rock

== Bibliography ==
- Jones, Andrew F. (1992). Like a Knife: Ideology and Genre in Contemporary Chinese Popular Music. Ithaca, New York: East Asia Program, Cornell University.
- Wong, Cynthia P. (2005). "Lost Lambs": Rock, Gender, Authenticity, and A Generational Response to Modernity in the People's Republic of China." Ph.D. dissertation. New York, New York: Columbia University, 2005
