= Ackbar Abbas =

Hong Kong academic (1942–2026)

- 馬文彬
- Born: 1942; Kennedy Town, Japanese-occupied Hong Kong
- Died: 13 July 2026 (aged 84); Beijing, China
- Education: University of Hong Kong, M.Phil.
- Spouse: Liu Sola

Ackbar Abbas or Ma Wenbin (Chinese: 馬文彬; pinyin: Ma wenbin; 1942 – 13 July 2026) was a Hong Kong academic who was a professor of comparative literature at the University of California, Irvine. Previously he was chair of comparative literature at the University of Hong Kong and also co-director of the Centre for the Study of Globalization and Cultures.

His research interests included globalization, Hong Kong and Chinese culture, architecture, cinema, postcolonialism, and critical theory. His book Hong Kong: Culture and the Politics of Disappearance was published by the University of Minnesota Press in 1997.

Abbas previously served as a Contributing Editor to Public Culture, an academic journal published by Duke University Press.

== Background ==
Born in 1942, Abbas was raised in Kennedy Town, Hong Kong to a family of Indian, Malaysian, and Chinese descent.

He obtained an MPhil from the University of Hong Kong.

He was married to Chinese vocalist and writer Liu Sola. Before this marriage, he was the husband of Ophelia Cheung Look-ping, the oldest sister of Leslie Cheung.

Abbas died in Beijing on 13 July 2026, at the age of 84 after fighting cancer.

== Publications ==
=== Books ===
- Hong Kong: Culture and the Politics of Disappearance. Minneapolis: University of Minnesota Press, 1997.
- Internationalizing Cultural Studies. Co-edited with John Erni. Oxford: Blackwell, 2005.
- Chen Danqing: Painting After Tiananmen. Hong Kong: University of Hong Kong, Cultural Studies Series No. 6, 1995.
- The Provocation of Jean Baudrillard. Ed. Hong Kong: Twilight Books, 1990.
- Literature and Anthropology. Co-edited with Jonathan Hall. Hong Kong: University of Hong Kong Press, 1986.
- Rewriting Literary History. Edited with T.W. Wong. Hong Kong: Hong Kong University Press, 1984.
- Literary Theory Today. Edited with T.W. Wong. Hong Kong: University of Hong Kong Press, 1981.

=== Editing ===
- Book Series Editor (with Wimal Dissanayake), The New Hong Kong Cinema. University of Hong Kong Press, 2002–present.
- Special issue editor (with Wu Hung), Hong Kong 1997: the Place and the Formula. Public Culture, May 1997.

=== Essays ===
- "Culture as Event in China’s Socialist Market Economy," in Proceedings of the 2005 Venice Biennale, ed. Robert Storr, forthcoming.
- "Faking Globalization," in Other Cities, Other Worlds: Urban Imaginaries in a Globalizing Age, ed. Andreas Huyssen (2008). Reprinted in A Visual Culture Reader, ed. Nicholas Mirzoeff, 3rd ed., (2012).
- "The Fake as Anthropological Object," in Konzept Böll. Thema 2: Alles eins? Die Globale Zukunft von Kultur und Demokratie (forthcoming).
- "Asian Phantasmagorias of the Interior," in HK Lab II: An Experience of Hong Kong's Interior Spaces, ed. Laurent Gutierrez, Valérie Portefaix, and Laura Ruggeri (Hong Kong: Map Book Publishers, 2005), 290–298.
- "The Turns and Returns of Beauty," in Uber Schonheit/About Beauty (Berlin: House of World Cultures, 2005), 91–103.
- "Framing the City Through Cinema," in Migrating Images (Berlin: House of World Cultures, 2004), 112–118.
