= Thin Man 1 =

Studio album by Thin Man
- Released: 1999
- Label: Jingwen Records

Thin Man chronology
Thin Man 1 (1999)	Beijing Dream (2002)

Thin Man 1 is the 1999 debut album of second generation Beijing hard rock band Thin Man. The album brought Chinese rock music out of a commercial trough at the end of the 90s, selling 100,000 copies in three months from its issue in August 1999.
