= Thin Man (band) =

Chinese rock band

Thin Man (瘦人乐队 shouren yuedui) are a Chinese rock band formed in Shandong in 1993 and moved to Beijing in 1994.

As other first wave Chinese rock bands such as Black Panther became more pop-orientated, Thin Man was one of the bands which continued to play heavy rock. Nevertheless, Thin Man became the first rock band allowed to perform on CCTV's Tongyi Shou Ge ("The Same Song") on June 30, 1999.

The line up in 2011 was lead singer Dai Qin (戴秦) Inner Mongolian, guitar Zhou Kun (周坤), bass San'er (仨儿) and drummer Hayato from Japan.

== Discography ==
- Thin Man 1 (瘦人1), 1999
- Beijing Dream 北京梦, 2002
- The Seventh Day (第七天, The Seventh Day), 2008
- Yi lu xiang bei (一路向北) EP, 2012
