= Wo zhe shi nian =

Studio album by Zang Tianshuo 臧天朔
- Released: 1995

Wo zhe shi nian (我这十年 Wǒ zhè shí nián "My Last Ten Years") is the 1995 debut album of Zang Tianshuo. The album is considered his most representative work. The title refers to the ten years from his first gig in 1985 to first album in 1995. Zang started as a hard rocker, but had mellowed his sound since 1985 and in 1993 began to record tracks that produced a soft rock album. Sales in July 1995, the first month, reached 150,000 copies, a large number then and since for a Chinese hard rock artist and making Zang China's best-selling rock artist of that year. The hit single "Pengyou" (Friend) brought Zang China-wide recognition. and the album received as "feelgood music." The album includes both songs from 1989 and Zang's solo work.

== Track listing ==
1. 我就是这个模样 Wǒ jiùshì zhège múyàng "This is just how I look"
2. 面子 Miànzi "Face"
3. 朋友 Péngyǒu "Friend"
4. 别离开 Bié líkāi "Don't leave"
5. 中央符号 Zhōngyāng fúhào "Central symbol"
6. 心的祈祷 Xīn de qídǎo "Prayer of the heart"
7. 的吧结吧 De ba jié ba
8. 说说 Shuō shuō "Say, say"
9. 美丽的姑娘山 Měilì de gūniang shān "Mountain of the pretty girls"
10. 磨合 Móhé "Running in, getting along"
