= Lajichang =

Studio album by He Yong
- Released: 1994
- Genre: Rock
- Label: Magic Stone
- Producer: Zhang Peiren

Lajichang (Chinese: 垃圾场; pinyin: Lājīchǎng; English: Garbage Dump) is a 1994 Chinese rock album by He Yong. It was the most controversial among the mainland release albums of the first generation of Beijing rock musicians.

== Tracklisting ==
| No. | Title | Length |
|---|---|---|
| 1. | "垃圾场" (Garbage Dump) | 3:41 |
| 2. | "姑娘漂亮" (Pretty Girl) | 3:03 |
| 3. | "头上的包" (Bumps on My Head) | 7:43 |
| 4. | "聊天" (Gossip) | 4:12 |
| 5. | "踏步" (March) | 4:55 |
| 6. | "钟鼓楼" (Bell and Drum Towers) | 6:19 |
| 7. | "冬眠" (Hibernation) | 3:55 |
| 8. | "非洲梦" (African Dream) | 3:49 |
| 9. | "幽灵" (Ghost) | 6:25 |
| 10. | "垃圾 (首版)" (Garbage Dump (alternate lyrics)) | 3:32 |

== Personnel ==
Personnel listed in the album's liner notes as follows:

=== Musicians ===
- He Yong - lead vocals; guitar; sanxian
- Eddie Randriamampionona, Liu Yijun, Wu Liqun (credited as "Laozai"), Qin Qi - guitar
- Jeroen den Hengst (credited as "Hei Yulong"), Luo Yan, Hei Bei - bass
- Wang Di - bass; keyboards; accordion; additional arrangements
- Liang Heping - keyboards; additional arrangements
- Zhang Yongguang, Liu Xiaosong - drums; percussion
- He Yusheng - sanxian
- Liu Qunqiang - dizi
- Central Song and Dance Troupe - additional folk instruments

=== Production ===
- Zhang Peiren - executive producer
- Wang Di, Liang Heping - production
- Wang Xiaobo - recording; mixing
- Cao Man, Xu Gang - recording
- Yan Zhongkun - mastering; additional mixing
