= Jeremy Goldkorn =

South African-American journalist

Jeremy Goldkorn (Chinese: 金玉米; Pinyin: Jīn Yùmǐ; born in Johannesburg) is a South African-American editor and entrepreneur who lives in Nashville, Tennessee.

== Biography ==
Goldkorn, who is of Jewish heritage, graduated from the University of Cape Town with a Bachelor of Arts (Honors) in Literature. He moved to China in 1995 and worked for several Beijing-based magazines, including Beijing Scene, TimeOut (which he founded as Le Magazine) and Chinese-language technology magazine ReDegg. He subsequently co-founded and worked as business development manager for Beijing design firm Standards Group. In 2003, he founded the website and company Danwei. It was initially a blog that translated Chinese language media articles and reported on the media and internet industries in China. The site was blocked in mainland China in 2009. The company pivoted to research services was acquired by the Financial Times in 2013.

He co-founded the Sinica Podcast with Kaiser Kuo in 2010. and was the editor-in-chief of news website The China Project until its closure in November 2023.

Goldkorn has spoken frequently about Chinese media and Internet culture, including at Yale University the University of Sydney and Columbia Law School, and in interviews with NPR, Frontline, the Australia Network and the Asia Society.

Goldkorn left China in 2015, settling in Nashville, Tennessee with his wife, the Chinese guzheng player and composer Wu Fei, with whom he has two children. In 2016 he became editor-in-chief a startup media company called SupChina, which later changed its name to The China Project.

On 6 November 2023, Goldkorn announced the closure of The China Project. He said that the site had "been accused many times in both the US and China "of working for nefarious purposes for the government of the other", and that "defending ourselves has incurred enormous legal costs", contributing to the decision to close.
