= Beijing Dream =

Studio album by Thin Man
- Released: 2002
- Label: Jingwen Records

Thin Man chronology
| Thin Man 1 (1999) | Beijing Dream (2002) | The Seventh Day (2008) |

Beijing Dream (Chinese: 北京梦; pinyin: Běijīng mèng) is a 2002 Mandarin Chinese-language rock album by Thin Man band. It was released on Jingwen Records on 15 July 2002.

== Track listing ==
1. 让我替你疯狂 Let me drive you crazy
2. 老师，我想对你说 F*** Teacher
3. 向远方 To a Place Far away
4. 蒙古战车 Mongol War Machine
5. 把爱全给你 Give All my Love to You
6. 你明白 You Understand
7. 因为你出现 Because You Appeared
8. 圈 Group
9. 北京梦 Beijing Dream
10. 希望 Hope
11. 新年 Newyear
