= Zhang Ju =

- Born: May 17, 1970; Hunan, China
- Died: May 11, 1995 (age 24) Beijing, China
- Genres: Heavy metal, progressive metal, folk metal
- Instruments: Bass, vocals, guitar
- Years active: 1987–1995
- Formerly of: Tang Dynasty, The Face

Zhang Ju (Chinese: 张炬; pinyin: Zhāng Jǜ; May 17, 1970 – May 11, 1995) was a Chinese musician, best known as the founding bassist and backing vocalist for the seminal progressive metal band Tang Dynasty.

== Early life and career ==
Zhang was born into a Tujia family in Hunan. As a child, he showed an interest in athletics, winning second place in the national high jump competition. He received his first guitar as a birthday present during his first year of junior high school.

In 1987, Zhang formed a band with vocalist Gao Qi and guitarist Cao Ping, switching to bass as they did not yet have a bass player. The band soon broke up due to ego clashes and musical differences.

Zhang founded Tang Dynasty in February 1989 with Ding Wu and Kaiser Kuo, serving as the band's lead vocalist until mid-1991. The band's eponymous debut album, released in December 1992 on Magic Stone Records, was an unprecedented success, selling around 900,000 legal copies, and is considered to be the first Chinese heavy metal album. Zhang sang lead and co-lead vocals on the track "Legend" and the band's cover of The Internationale, respectively. He sang backing vocals live in addition to handling bass duties.

Zhang Ju was very well-liked among the Beijing rock music circle. His apartment served as a gathering place for musicians, and was where the members of Tang Dynasty ate and slept from October 1989 through May 1990.

Zhang also contributed the majority of bass tracks on The Face's debut album, The Instinct of Fire, released in 1995. It would be his last recording before his death.

== Death ==
On May 11, 1995, Zhang was returning home via the Zizhuqiao Freeway Overpass after a rehearsal with The Face. At around 10 pm, his motorcycle collided with a truck at a poorly-lit intersection. Despite efforts to resuscitate him, Zhang died from his injuries, just six days shy of his 25th birthday. His death had a profound impact on the Chinese rock scene, elevating him to martyr-like status among fans. Zhang's funeral took place on October 26, 1995, at Lianggezhuang Palace in the Western Qing tombs, and was attended by a roster of famous Beijing rock musicians, including his own Tang Dynasty bandmates. His motorcycle was subsequently displayed at Wang Yong's Keep in Touch rock club in Beijing.

Zhang's death put Tang Dynasty in a tailspin. The band split with Magic Stone and developed conflicts regarding artistic direction, nearly breaking up in 1996. Eventually, Tang Dynasty replaced Zhang with Breathing bassist Gu Zhong, who has remained the group's bassist.

== Tributes ==
In 1997, a two-disc tribute album entitled Goodbye Zhang Ju (Chinese: 再见张炬; pinyin: Zài Jìan Zhāng Jǜ), featuring interviews and songs by remaining members of Tang Dynasty as well as a number of Zhang's Beijing rock colleagues, was released. One track, "Your Vision", was rerecorded for Tang Dynasty's second album, Epic.

In 2005, the compilation Gift (Chinese: 礼物; pinyin: Lǐwù) was released to commemorate the tenth anniversary of his death.

== Discography ==
=== Tang Dynasty ===
==== Studio albums ====
- 1992 – 唐朝 (Tang Dynasty) – bass (all tracks); backing vocals; lead vocals ("传说"); co-lead vocals (国际歌)

==== Live albums ====
- 1990 – 90现代音乐会 ('90 Modern Music Concert) – lead vocals/bass ("谁都希望" and "粉雾")
- 1995 – 摇滚中国乐势力 (Chinese Rock Forces: Live in Hong Kong) – bass/backing vocals ("飞翔鸟" and "选择")

=== The Face ===
- 1995 – 火的本能 (The Instinct of Fire) – bass (all tracks except "梦" and "欢乐颂")

=== Posthumous releases ===
- 1997 – 再见张炬 (Goodbye Zhang Ju) – two interviews and "无题"
