= Underground Baby =

Chinese rock band

Dixiayinger compilation album 2008

Underground Baby or Underbaby (地下婴儿 dìxiàyīng'ér) is a Chinese rock band. Their first notable recording was in 1996 their song Dou Yiyang (都一样) was recorded on the compilation China Fire II (中国火二), followed by two more tracks on China Fire III in 1997.

== Albums ==
- juéxǐng 觉醒 1998
