= Ambient Dub Volume I =

Studio album by Divination
- Released: October 8, 1993
- Studio: Greenpoint Studio, Brooklyn, NY
- Genre: Ambient dub
- Length: 51:49
- Label: Subharmonic
- Producer: Bill Laswell

Divination chronology
Ambient Dub Volume I (1993)	Ambient Dub Volume II: Dead Slow (1993)

Bill Laswell chronology
Asian Games (1993)	Ambient Dub Volume I (1993)	Ambient Dub Volume II: Dead Slow (1993)

Professional ratings
Review scores
Source	Rating
AllMusic	4.5/5 stars

Ambient Dub Volume I is the first album by American composer Bill Laswell to be issued under the moniker Divination. It was released on October 8, 1993, by Subharmonic.

== Track listing ==
All music is composed by Bill Laswell, except "Delta" by Robert Musso and "Tian Zhen" by Liu Sola.

No.	Title	Length
1.	"Divination One"	3:43
2.	"Seven Heavens"	12:17
3.	"Erratta"	4:26
4.	"Delta"	5:56
5.	"Tian Zhen"	4:27
6.	"Agrippa"	6:55
7.	"Godspeed"	8:22
8.	"Ain Soph Aour"	5:51

== Personnel ==
Adapted from the Ambient Dub Volume I liner notes.

Musicians

- Jeff Bova – bass guitar, keyboards, effects
- Buckethead – effects
- Bill Laswell – bass guitar, effects, producer
- Robert Musso – effects, engineering, producer (4)
- Nicky Skopelitis – guitar, effects
- Liu Sola – voice, effects

Technical

- Imad Mansour – assistant engineer
- Thi-Linh Le – photography
- Howie Weinberg – mastering

== Release history ==
Region	Date	Label	Format	Catalog
United States	1993	Subharmonic	CD	SD 7001-2
