= Ambient Dub Volume II: Dead Slow =

Studio album by Divination
- Released: November 19, 1993
- Studio: Greenpoint Studio, Brooklyn, NY
- Genre: Ambient dub
- Length: 61:38
- Label: Subharmonic
- Producer: Bill Laswell

Divination chronology
Ambient Dub Volume I (1993)	Ambient Dub Volume II: Dead Slow (1993)	Light in Extension (1994)

Bill Laswell chronology
Ambient Dub Volume I (1993)	Ambient Dub Volume II: Dead Slow (1993)	Light in Extension (1994)

Professional ratings
Review scores
Source	Rating
AllMusic	4/5 stars

Ambient Dub Volume II: Dead Slow is the second album by American composer Bill Laswell to be issued under the moniker Divination. It was released in November 19, 1993 by Subharmonic. The album is 61:38 minutes in length.

== Track listing ==
All music is composed by Bill Laswell, except "Journeys" by Mick Harris.

No.	Title	Length
1.	"Dead Slow"	4:09
2.	"Baraka"	15:13
3.	"Silent Fields"	4:07
4.	"Evil Eye"	14:31
5.	"Dream Light"	10:00
6.	"Journeys"	13:32

== Personnel ==
Adapted from the Ambient Dub Volume II liner notes.

Musicians

- Jeff Bova – keyboards, effects
- Mick Harris – voice and effects (6)
- Bill Laswell – bass guitar, effects, editing
- Robert Musso – electronics, engineering
- Jah Wobble – bass guitar, effects

Technical

- Oz Fritz – additional engineering
- Imad Mansour – assistant engineer
- Thi-Linh Le – photography
- Howie Weinberg – mastering

== Release history ==
Region	Date	Label	Format	Catalog
United States	1993	Subharmonic	CD	SD 7003-2
