= Fang Gan =

Tang dynasty poet (809–888)

- 方干
- Born: 809; White Cloud Village, Tonglu, Zhejiang
- Died: 888 (aged 78–79); Mountain retreat in Jinghu
- Other names: Fang Xiongfei (雄飞); Xuanying (玄英)
- Occupation: Poet

Chinese name
- Chinese: 方干
Transcriptions
Standard Mandarin
- Hanyu Pinyin: Fāng Gān
- IPA: [fáŋ kán]
Yue: Cantonese
- Jyutping: fong^{1} gon^{1}
Southern Min
- Hokkien POJ: hng kan
Middle Chinese
- Middle Chinese: /pjang kan/

Fang Gan (方干; 809–888), also known as Fang Xiongfei (雄飞) and Xuanying (玄英), was a Tang dynasty poet.

== Life and career ==
Fang's father, Fang Su (方肅), was a jinshi and Hangzhou-based magistrate who founded the Fang Clan of White Cloud (白雲方氏) in White Cloud Village, Tonglu, Zhejiang. According to the tenth-century Jianjie lu (鑑誡錄) or Records of Warnings, Fang Gan was the fourteenth son of his family. He was nicknamed "Fang Sanbai" (方三拜, literally "Fang Three Bows") because of his idiosyncrasy of bowing three times to whomever he met. Despite being academically gifted, he failed the imperial examination more than ten times, apparently because of his cleft lip which examiners felt would bring Chinese academia into disrepute.

Fang successfully underwent surgery for his cleft lip about a decade after retiring to Jinghu. According to a poem by Song dynasty poet Xu Tianyou (徐天佑), titled "Fan Gan Dao" (方幹島) or "Fan Gan's Island", this operation took place around 880. Now referred to as "Buchun Xiansheng" (補唇先生) or "Mr Lip Mended", Fang spent his final years in a local mountain retreat. Fang was a noted player of the guqin, and enjoyed fishing and drinking in his spare time.

Fang wrote countless poems in his lifetime, three hundred and seventy of which were preserved by one of his proteges and subsequently published in a ten-juan anthology by Wang Zan (王贊). Following a popular campaign against "Qu mingru" (屈名儒) or "injustice to noted scholars", Fang was posthumously recognised as a successful imperial candidate. A Chinese proverb about posthumous recognition thus goes, "Shenhou shi Fang Gan" (身後識方干) or "Not until after his death was Fan Gan recognised".
