= Tang Dynasty (band) =

Chinese rock band

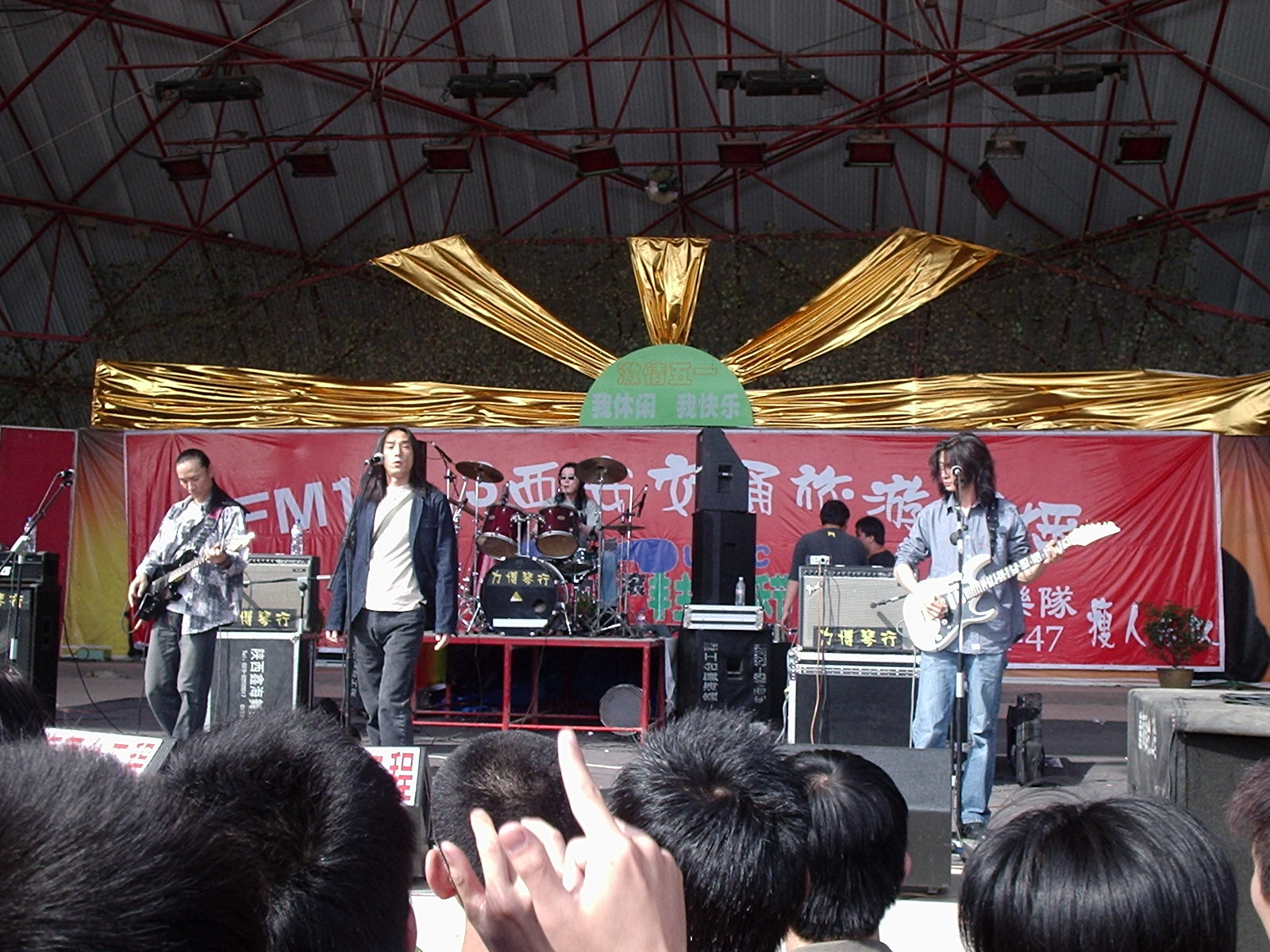
- Tang Dynasty performing in 2004.

Background information
- Origin: Beijing, China
- Genres: Progressive metal, heavy metal, folk metal, art rock
- Years active: 1989–present
- Labels: Rock; Jingwen; Starsing
- Members: Ding Wu; Zhao Nian; Gu Zhong; Liu Jingwei; Fu Dalong
- Past members: Zhang Ju; Liu Yijun; Kaiser Kuo; Chen Lei; Yu Yang; Andrew Szabo
- Website: http://tangchao.ent.163.com

Tang Dynasty (Chinese: 唐朝; pinyin: Táng Cháo) is a Chinese rock band formed in 1989. They are often credited as being the first Chinese heavy metal band and the first band in Asia to fusion folk metal as well.

== History ==
Singer and rhythm guitarist Ding Wu, bassist Zhang Ju, and Chinese-American guitarist Kaiser Kuo co-founded Tang Dynasty in early 1989. Kuo left shortly after to return to the United States, with Liu "Lao Wu" Yijun taking his place. According to Kaiser, Liu went on to become China's first "guitar hero." In 1990 the band participated in the Chinese modern rock concert, where they performed early versions of two of their eventual songs. In 1991, the band released its metal/rock version of "The Internationale" in Chinese.

Tang Dynasty rose to fame with their eponymous debut album, released in December 1992. The album officially sold about 2,000,000 authentic copies throughout Asia and abroad, not counting the multitudes more of infringing copies. Their sound is part progressive rock and artistic metal and part traditional Chinese vocal technique. The lyrical poetry and musical arrangements meant to hearken back to the glorious days of ancient Chinese civilization; in particular, the art and cultural epitome of Chinese history as popularly represented by the era of the Tang dynasty.

In 1993, Tang Dynasty performed at "The Chinese Avant Garde", a concert featuring Cui Jian, Cobra, and Wang Yong, some of the most prominent rock artists from China at the time. During this concert, they would play songs from their first album, closing the concert with "The Internationale". In 1994, Tang Dynasty performed at "The Power of Chinese Rock Bands" alongside Dou Wei, Zhang Chu, and He Yong, closing the concert with "Choice" and "Soaring Bird". Tragedy struck when bassist Zhang Ju died on May 11, 1995, when his motorcycle collided with a truck on the Zizhuqiao freeway overpass in western Beijing. Gu Zhong joined the band to fill the empty role of bass player. That August, Liu left the band. Co-founder Kaiser Kuo rejoined as guitarist in August 1996. During this time, the band had developed creativity conflicts and had parted with their Magic Stone Label, almost disbanding during this era.

The band's 1998 release Epic was their second album, seven years after their debut record. The record received less recognition, as many believed the album had abandoned Tang Dynasty's oriental rock style for a more western style. In 1999, Tang Dynasty would hold a series of live performances showcasing tracks on Epic along with some popular tracks from Tang Dynasty. Kaiser again parted company with Tang Dynasty in June 1999 after a multitude of disagreements with Ding brought to a head by the bombing of the Chinese Embassy in Yugoslavia. He would later form another well-recognized metal/rock band, Spring and Autumn (Chunqiu). Kaiser was replaced by former Iron Kite frontman Yu Yang, and then by young guitar virtuoso Chen Lei in late 2000. After some more member changes, Liu rejoined the group in 2002.

Tang Dynasty released their third album Romantic Knight ("Langman Qishi") in mid-2008, featuring "Feng Shan Ji" as the album's lead track. Kaiser appeared in the Western documentary by Sam Dunn, Global Metal, released that same year.

In January 2009, Liu announced his second departure from the band due to "personal reasons." Vocalist Ding filled the spot of second guitarist. In February 2010, Ding Wu announced that the band was preparing for their fourth release due out later in the year. The next month, Tang Dynasty put out a two-song EP entitled Ups and Downs. The band released their fourth album, Thorn, in November 2013, and toured outside China for the first time in nearly two decades.

On February 20, 2019, Tang Dynasty revealed on Weibo that lead guitarist Chen Lei had been replaced by Liu Jingwei and Fu Dalong, again making the band a five-piece lineup.

== Members ==
Current members

- Ding Wu – lead vocals, guqin, xiao (1991–present), rhythm guitar (1989–2002, 2009–2019)
- Zhao Nian – drums, percussion (1989–present)
- Gu Zhong – bass, backing vocals (1995–present)
- Liu Jingwei – lead guitar (2019–present)
- Fu Dalong – lead guitar (2019–present)

Former members

- Kaiser Kuo – lead guitar (1989, 1996–1999)
- Liu Yijun – lead guitar (1989–1996, 2003–2009)
- Zhang Ju – bass (1989–1995; died 1995), lead vocals (1989–1991), backing vocals (1991–1995)
- Yu Yang – lead guitar (1999–2000)
- Chen Lei – lead guitar, backing vocals (2000–2019)
- Andrew Szabo – drums (1989)

Touring musicians

- Wang Yong - keyboards (1993–1995)

== Discography ==
=== Studio albums ===
- 1992 - 唐朝 (Tang Dynasty)
- 1998 - 演义 (Epic)
- 2008 - 浪漫骑士 (Romantic Knight)
- 2013 - 芒刺 (Thorn)

=== EPs ===
- 2000 - 演义单曲纪念珍藏版 (Epic (single))
- 2010 - 沉浮 (Ups and Downs)

=== Compilations ===
- 90 Modern Music Concert (1990) - "谁都希望"; "粉雾"
- China Fire I (1992) - "飞翔鸟"
- A Tribute to Teresa Teng (1995) - "独上西楼"
- Goodbye Zhang Ju (1997) - "月梦"
- True Love Forever (2000) - "花儿为什么这样红"; "明月千里寄相思"
- Gift - "春蚕"

== See also ==
- Chinese heavy metal
- Chinese rock
- Cui Jian
- Dou Wei
- Overload
- Zhang Chu
