= Mary Kay Magistad =

American journalist and correspondent

- Education: Northwestern University (BS); University of Sussex (MA)
- Occupations: Journalist; correspondent
- Awards: Scripps Howard Award (2006)

Mary Kay Magistad is an American journalist and correspondent.

Magistad covered Northeast Asia for the Public Radio International program, PRI's The World, a co-production between the BBC World Service, PRI, and WGBH Radio Boston since 1996. In that capacity she covered "the geopolitical struggle over North Korea's weapons program, to the SARS epidemic, to tensions in Kashmir, Magistad has brought local perspective to stories with international impact." She has also been a correspondent and reporter for National Public Radio, The Washington Post, and the Christian Science Monitor. She was responsible for opening the first Beijing bureau for National Public Radio. She has covered stories as varied as the rise of China as an economic power over the last decade, the fabric of Chinese society, Chinese war games preceding Taiwan's first presidential elections, the crackdown on the Falun Gong spiritual sect, and increasing tensions in the Sino-US relationship. She has also been a regular correspondent in Africa, where she has covered Ethiopian famine, the aftermath of genocide in Rwanda, and the Polisario's forgotten war in the Western Sahara. She was a 1999-2000 Nieman fellow and a 2001-2002 Radcliffe fellow, both at Harvard University.

Magistad shared a 2006 Scripps-Howard National Journalism Award with three colleagues at the PRI's The World for their series on stem cell research in China (Magistad's contribution), Israel, Britain and the United States. The series, which also won a 2006 duPont-Columbia silver baton, offered a primer on stem cell research, as the interests of science, medicine, politics and religion converge and conflict in the ethical debate over their use.

Magistad was trained in journalism receiving her BS in journalism at Northwestern University. She also has an MA in international relations at the University of Sussex in England, and completed a Rotary Foundation fellowship.
