= Again (band) =

Chinese rock band

Lunhui (轮回) English name Again, is a Chinese rock band formed in 1991. It was one of the first Beijing rock groups to sign with a Japanese label, signing with JVC and producing the album Xīnlèjí (心乐集) in 1997.

== Discography ==
- Chuangzao 创造 1995 cassette
- Xinleji 心乐集 1997 JVC
  - Chun qu chun lai 春去春来 single 2000
- Wo de taiyang 我的太阳 2002
- Chaoyue 超越 2002
- Qidai 期待 2004
