= Culture Express =

English-language Chinese TV program

Culture Express is an English-language program broadcast on CCTV News, a Chinese state television channel. The program provides coverage of entertainment events happening mostly in China, such as music and dance festivals, but also covers events worldwide and in the U.S., such as premieres of major American motion pictures.

The program is hosted by Ji Xiaojun, Julian Waghann or Jennifer Hsiung. It broadcasts daily at 17:30 BJT and rebroadcasts daily at 23:30 BJT.
