= Liu Sola =

Chinese singer and composer (born 1955)

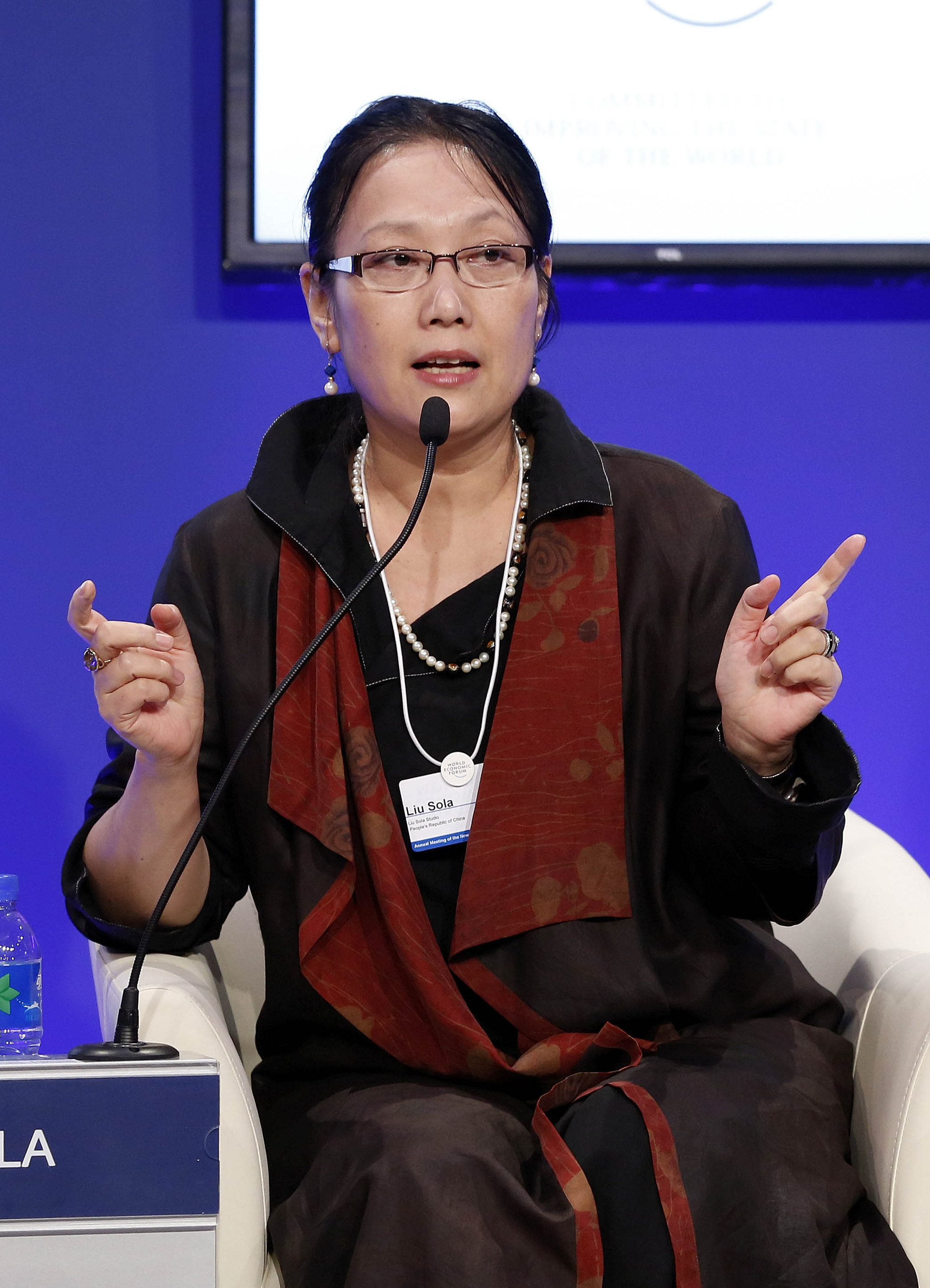
Liu at the World Economic Forum Annual Meeting of the New Champions in 2012

Liu Sola (Chinese: 刘索拉; pinyin: Liú Suǒlā; born 1955) is a Chinese composer, vocalist, music producer, and author.

== Biography ==
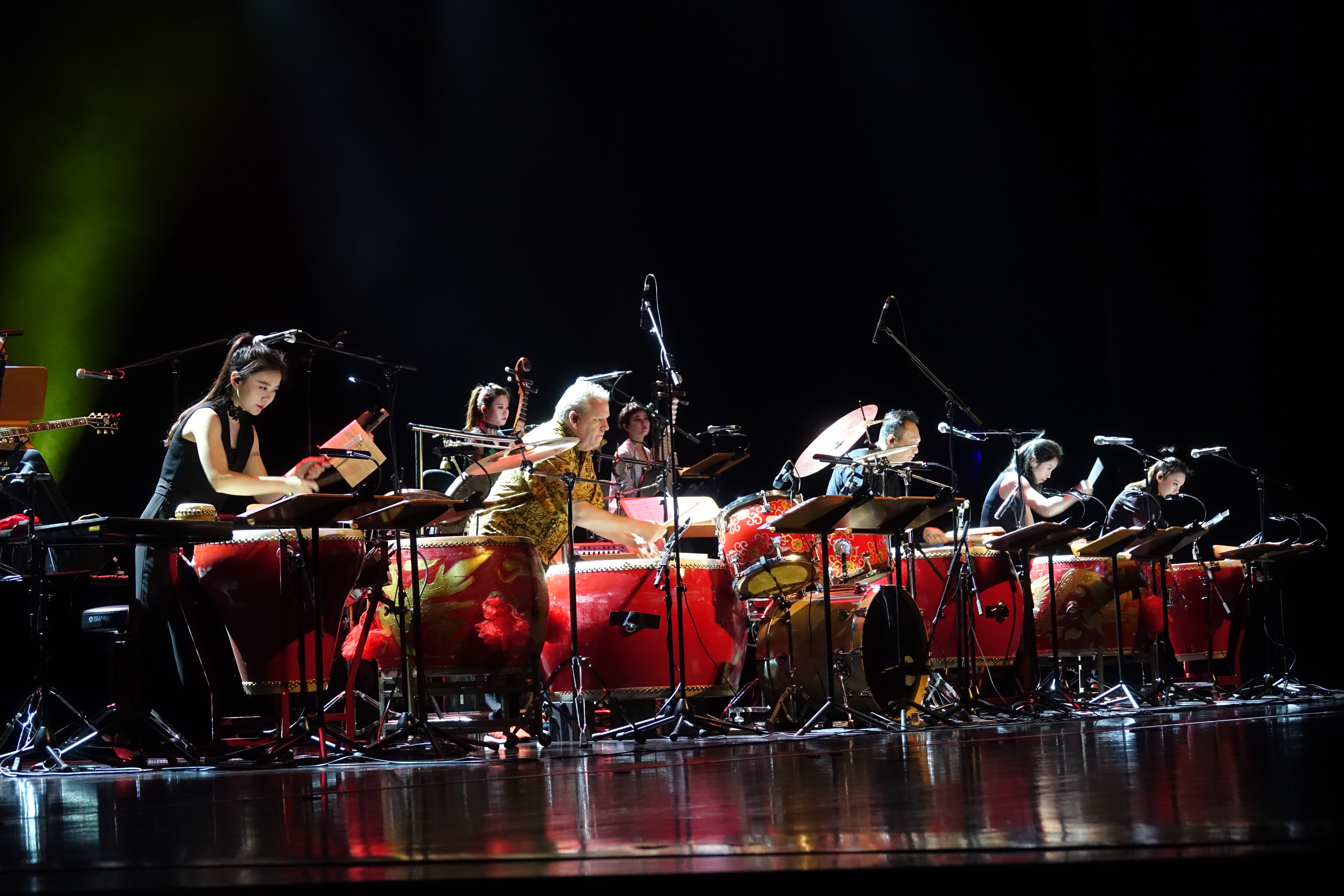
Liu Sola & Friends Ensemble national tour 2017 in Poly Theatre

Liu was born in Beijing, China. After graduating from the Central Conservatory of Music with a degree in composition, she published her award-winning novella You Have No Choice. Since the 1980s, Liu Sola has scored many Chinese and international film sound tracks, as well as TV and drama productions. She has composed music for orchestra, ensemble, opera, modern theater, modern dance, and art exhibitions. Her range of musical styles includes classical music, jazz, early music, rock, traditional and contemporary music. She is frequently invited to perform at international music festivals and has recorded and collaborated with many international artists. During the 1990s, she recorded with Pól Brennan, Bill Laswell, James Blood Ulmer, Jerome Brailey, Henry Threadgill, Umar Bin Hassan, Amina Claudine Myers, Fernando Saunders and, Pheeroan akLaff. In 2003, she founded the Liu Sola & Friends Ensemble, teaming up with Chinese instrumental virtuosos such as Li Zhengui, Zhang Yangsheng, and Yang Jing, together with other young award-winning soloists. In 2012, Chinese guitar virtuoso Liu Yijun (lao wu) joined the ensemble.

She is the founder of Liu Sola (Beijing) Music Studio, located in Songzhuang art colony, an artist district. Liu Sola designed and built a music space for her ensemble to rehearse and record. Over the years, she has composed and produced film soundtracks for directors such as Zhang Nuanxin, Michael Apted, Li Shaohong, Lv Yue, Ning Ying and others. In 2013, she established the Liu Sola & Friends Ensemble Independent Film Music Work Shop.

Her music works include the chamber opera Fantasy of the Red Queen (2006), performed by Ensemble Modern and the Liu Sola & Friends Ensemble. Liu Sola is the librettist and music composer, artistic director, costume designer and leading vocalist. The chamber opera The Afterlife of Li Jiantong (2009) is a work dedicated to her mother, a Chinese political-historical writer. Liu Sola wrote both the libretto and the music. It was performed by Theatre of Voices, conducted by Paul Hillier.

Her novels include Chaos & All That (1989), the English translation of which by Richard King, was awarded First Prize for translation by the British Comparative Literature Association, Nü Zhen Tang (2000), which has been translated into French and Italian, La Grande Île des Tortues – Cochons (2006) and Lost in Fascination (2011).

Liu was married to Hong Kong-born scholar and cultural critic Ackbar Abbas.

== Bibliography ==
=== Novellas ===
- Ni Bie Wu Xuanze 你别无选择 You Have No Choice (1985)
- Lan tian lühai 蓝天绿海 Blue Sky Green Sea (1985)
- In Search of the King of Singers (1986)

=== Novels ===
- Chaos and All That (1989)
- Da Ji Jia de Xiao Gu Shi 大继家的小故事 or Small Tales of the Great Ji Family (2000)
- Nü Zhen Tang 女贞汤 Female Purity Soup (2003)
- La Grande île des tortues-cochons (2006)
- La Piccola Storia Della Grande Famiglia Ji

== Play ==
- Fantasy of the Red Queen (2006)

== Discography ==
- Blues in the East (1994)
- China Collage (1996, with Wu Man)
- Haunts (1997)
- June Snow (1998)
- Spring Snowfall (2000)
- Sola and Friends (1999)
- Apparitions (2000)
