= Breathing (band) =

Chinese rock band

Breathing (呼吸樂隊 hūxī yuèduì) were a Chinese rock music band of the early 1990s. They were one of the six bands to participate in the 1990 Modern Music Concert.
