= Iron Kite =

Chinese band

Iron Kite (铁风筝 tie fengzheng) are a Chinese heavy metal rock group.

They first gained attention with songs on compilations: Zhe ge xiatian 这个夏天 (that summer) on China Fire II and Evolution Day (进化之日) on China Fire III.
