= Zang Tianshuo =

Chinese musician (1964–2018)

Zang Tianshuo 臧天朔
- Born: 6 March 1964; Beijing, China
- Died: 28 September 2018 (aged 54) Beijing, China
- Genres: Chinese rock
- Occupations: Singer-songwriter, musician, composer
- Instruments: Vocals; guitar; keyboard
- Years active: 1984–2008, 2014–2018

Zang Tianshuo (Chinese: 臧天朔; pinyin: Zāng Tiānshuò; 6 March 1964 – 28 September 2018) was a Chinese rock musician.

== Biography ==
Zang Tianshuo began his musical career with the band 1989, formed with his childhood friends Qin Yong, Qin Qi and Li Li, and they incorporated American Chinese singers Jin Dayou and Lu Jisheng into the band's line up.

Zang died of liver cancer in Beijing on 28 September 2018 at the age of 54.

== Discography ==
- 1995 My Last Ten Years (我这十年, Wo zhe shi nian)
- 1996 Xīn hái zài děnghòu
- 1998 Pěng chū zìjǐ
