= The Face (band) =

Chinese rock band

The Face (面孔乐队) is a Chinese rock band formed in 1989. They appeared on the compilation China Fire I in 1991, but did not issue their first album Huo de benneng (火的本能) until 1995.

They participated in Iqiyi's music variety show The Big Band in 2019, ultimately earning 7th place in the competition.
