= Heibao (album) =

1992 album by Chinese rock band Black Panther

Heibao 黑豹

Studio album by Black Panther
- Released: August 1991 (Hong Kong); December 1, 1992 (China, Taiwan)
- Genres: Pop rock, hard rock, glam metal
- Labels: Kinn's Management Ltd. Magic Stone Records
- Producer: Li Zhenquan

Black Panther chronology
Heibao 黑豹 (1991)	Guangmang zhi shen 光芒之神 (1993)

Heibao (Chinese: 黑豹) is the self-titled debut album by seminal Chinese rock band Black Panther, released in August 1991 in Hong Kong on Kinn's Management Ltd. and December 1, 1992 in China and Taiwan on Magic Stone Records.

The album spawned two hits; the opening track "Shameful" became the group's best-known song, while the power ballad "Don't Break My Heart" topped the Hong Kong charts for three weeks upon its release. Black Panther were soon signed by Taiwanese record label Rock Records, which was then establishing a rock market in China via its mainland subsidiary, Magic Stone. The Magic Stone edition of the record was released in China and Taiwan in December 1992. The album sold 1.5 million copies, making it one of the bestselling Chinese rock albums of all time.

In 1992, lead vocalist Dou Wei left the band to pursue an influential solo career.

== Track listing ==
All lyrics are written by Dou Wei, except where noted.

Standard listing
No.	Title	Lyrics	Music	Length
1.	"无地自容" (Shameful)		Li Tong	5:39
2.	"Take Care"	Huang Xiaomao	Dou Wei	6:05
3.	"体会" (Experience)	Li Tong	Li Tong	4:45
4.	"别来纠缠我" (Don't Chase After Me)		Dou Wei	4:45
5.	"靠近我" (Stay Close to Me)		Wang Wenjie	6:09
6.	"Don’t Break My Heart"		Dou Wei	5:16
7.	"脸谱" (Mask)	Li Tong	Li Tong	4:54
8.	"怕你为自己流泪" (Please Don't Cry)		Dou Wei	4:51
9.	"眼光里" (In Your Eyes)	Huang Xiaomao	Wang Wenjie	4:40
10.	"别去糟蹋" (Don't Go to Waste)		Li Tong	7:28

== Personnel ==
Personnel from the liner notes listed as follows:

=== Black Panther ===
- Dou Wei - lead vocals
- Li Tong - guitar, backing vocals
- Wang Wenjie - bass, backing vocals
- Zhao Mingyi - drums, backing vocals
- Luan Shu - keyboards, backing vocals

=== Production ===
- Li Zhenquan - production, recording, mixing, mastering, additional arrangements
