= Zhang Chu (singer) =

Chinese musician (born 1968)

- Born: 17 November 1968 (age 57); Liuyang, Hunan, China
- Origin: Xi'an, Shaanxi, China
- Genres: Alternative Rock, Post-rock, Ambient, Folk, Electronic
- Occupation: Singer-songwriter
- Years active: 1988 - present
- Website: www.zhangchu.com

Zhang Chu (Chinese: 张楚; pinyin: Zhāng Chǔ, born 17 November 1968) is a Chinese musician who was born in Liuyang, Hunan.

== Career ==
Zhang Chu's first single, "Sister", was released in 1992. That same year, he recorded a rock cover of the propaganda song "Socialism is Good", for his Red Rock album.

== Albums ==
- 1992 Sister (姐姐) in China Fire I (中国火壹)
- 1993 A Heart Cannot Fawn (一颗不肯媚俗的心)
- 1994 "Shameful being Left Alone" (official title) AKA "Loners are disgraceful"(孤独的人是可耻的)
- 1995 My Eyelashes Are Almost Blown Away By The Wind in A Tribute To Zhang Ju (zaijian 张炬)
- 1996 Known (认识了) in China Fire II (中国火贰)
- 1997 Aeroplane Factory (造飞机的工厂)
- 1998 So Big (这么大) in China Fire III (中国火叁)

== See also ==
- C-Rock/Sino-Rock
