= Kaiser Kuo =

Chinese American journalist and musician

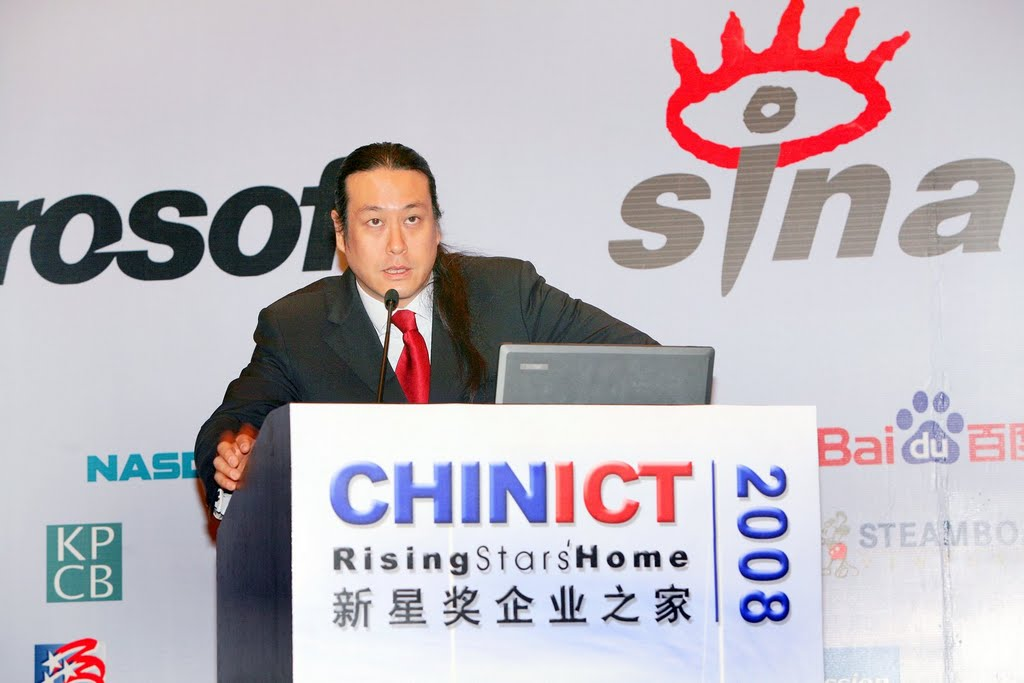
- Kaiser Kuo in 2008
- Born: March 6, 1966 (age 60)
- Occupations: Writer, Musician

Kaiser Kuo (simplified Chinese: 郭怡广; traditional Chinese: 郭怡廣; pinyin: Guō Yíguǎng; born March 7, 1966) is a Chinese American musician, writer and podcaster.

== Early life and education ==
Kuo was born in New York State in 1966. His parents came from families that had fled to Taiwan as supporters of the Kuomintang. Kuo's grandfather, Guo Tingyi (1904—1975) (also Kuo Ting-yee), was a historian of Chinese modern history who founded the Institute of Modern History at Academia Sinica in Taiwan. In 1971, his grandfather feared political persecution by the Kuomintang government and fled Taiwan to settle in the United States, where he taught at institutions including East-West Center (University of Hawaii), Harvard University and Columbia University. His work An Outline of Modern Chinese History was first published posthumously in Hong Kong in 1979.

Kuo's parents met in Columbus, Ohio, where both were pursuing their studies. Kuo grew up in the US. In 1981, at the age of 15, Kaiser Kuo visited China for the first time with his parents and returned to China for a family vacation in 1986. Observing the significant progress the country had made over the previous five years, he decided to study Chinese at the University of Arizona and subsequently spent several extended periods in Beijing. During this early phase, he also helped found the rock band Tang Dynasty, the first Chinese heavy metal band, and was the lead guitarist throughout the 1990s. Per the Asia Society, Kuo has a BA in Political Science from the UC Berkeley and an MA in East Asian Studies from the University of Arizona. After 1999, as the digital era began to take hold, he became involved in that scene, working as a tech journalist and handling public relations for Youku. In 2010, he joined the internet services company Baidu as Director of International Communications. That same year, he also the Sinica podcast series as a side project.

Kuo's brother is Jay Kuo, who wrote the musical, Allegiance.

== Career ==
Kuo worked as a technology correspondent for Red Herring magazine, and later served as director of digital strategy for China at Ogilvy & Mather in Beijing.

From 2001 to 2011 he wrote a column for the foreigner-focused English-language magazine The Beijinger. He worked from 2010 to 2016 as director for international communications for Chinese search engine Baidu.

In 2010, Kuo started a current affairs podcast based in Beijing named Sinica that invited foreign journalists covering China and "China-watchers" to participate in discussions about Chinese political and economic affairs. Guests and co-hosts have included Gady Epstein, Mary Kay Magistad of Public Radio International, Tania Branigan of The Guardian, Evan Osnos of The New Yorker, Arthur Kroeber of Dragonomics, Jeremy Goldkorn of Danwei and Bill Bishop, founder of CBS MarketWatch. Sinica was recorded at the Popup Chinese studios in Beijing from 2010 to 2016.

In April 2016, Kuo announced that the Sinica Podcast was acquired by a New York startup and that he would return to the United States with his family to focus full-time on the Sinica podcast. From 2017 he was editor-at-large of digital media venture SupChina which had acquired Sinica, which later expanded to become The China Project. Kuo and Goldkorn co-hosted the Sinica Podcast until The China Project announced in November 2023 that it was shutting down operations due to a lack of funding.

As of 2025, he was a speaker for the China Speakers Bureau.

== Personal life ==
In 1989 Kuo was a founding member of the Chinese rock band Tang Dynasty. He returned to the US "shortly" after that. and later formed another Chinese heavy metal rock group, Spring and Autumn (Chinese: 春秋). Kuo's musical involvement also involved playing bass for Dirty Deeds, an AC/DC cover band based in Beijing. As of 2008 he was living in the US. In 2016 he lived in China and "returned" to the US.

== See also ==
- Americans in China
- Chinese rock
