= Wang Yong (musician) =

Chinese musician

Wang Yong (王勇; Beijing, 1964) is a Chinese rock and world music musician. He trained as a guzheng player. In 1996 he issued his best-known album Samsara (往生).
