= Black Panther (band) =

Chinese rock band

Black Panther 黑豹 Hēi Bào
- Also known as: 黑豹乐队
- Origin: China
- Genres: Hard rock, heavy metal, glam metal
- Years active: 1987–present
- Label: Rock Forward Entertainment 风华秋实
- Members: Li Tong; Wang Wenjie; Zhao Mingyi; Hui Peng; Xiang Yahong
- Past members: Ding Wu; Dou Wei; Luan Shu; Qin Yong; Zhang Kepeng; Feng Xiabo; Wang Wenfang; Zhang Qi

Black Panther (Chinese: 黑豹; pinyin: Hēi Bào) is a seminal Chinese rock band founded in 1987. It was originally fronted by one of China's alternative music pioneers Dou Wei. The band reunited and released a new album in 2013. "Who We Are", was produced by Jamii Szmadzinski. The band's best known songs include "Don't Break My Heart", "Shameful"《无地自容》, "Mirage"《海市蜃楼》, "I'm Afraid Of Your Crying"《怕你为自己流泪》, "Spirit Of Light" 《光芒之神》, "No Right, No Wrong" 《无是无非》, "Our Generation" 《我们这一代》, "Without you"《没有你》, "I Don't Want To Say Goodbye" and "Lonely Soul"《孤独的灵魂》 etc. Black Panther is represented by Rock Forward Entertainment.

== Discography ==
=== Studio albums ===
- Black Panther 黑豹 1992-12-01
- Spirit Of Light 黑豹II 光芒之神 1993-08-01
- No Right, No Wrong 黑豹III 无是无非 1996-02-11
- Can't Let My Angst Go Unexpressed 黑豹IV 不能让我的烦恼没机会表白 1998-05-01
- 狂飙激情 1999-01-01
- 摇滚中国乐势力（十年精选第一辑1999-2000）2003-07-01
- Black Panther V 黑豹V 2004-07-22
- Who are we? 我们是谁 2013-07-11
- Last Order 尽余欢 2015-12-14
- How Do We Find A Way 2016-11-23
- 键盘-狭 2016-12-22
- Cheers 干杯 2017-03-22
- True Color 本色 2017-04-21

Compilation appearances:

- 真爱永恒 (1999) - "Santa Lucia" 桑塔•露琪亚
- A Tribute to Teresa Teng (1995) - "爱的箴言"; "爱人"
- China Fire I 中国火I (1992) - "别去糟蹋"
- Oriental Pearl III 東方之珠 III (1992) - "Don't Break My Heart"

== Members ==
=== Current members ===
- Li Tong – lead guitar (1987–present)
- Wang Wenjie – bass guitar (1987–present)
- Zhao Mingyi – drums (1989–present)
- Hui Peng – keyboards (1999–present)
- Xiang Yahong – lead vocals, rhythm guitar (2023–present)

=== Former members ===
- Ding Wu – lead vocals (1987–1988)
- Guo Chuanlin – rhythm guitar (1987; died 2026)
- Wang Wenfang – drums (1987)
- Dou Wei – lead vocals (1988–1991)
- Feng Xiaobo – keyboards (1993–1999)
- Luan Shu – keyboards (1990–1993), lead vocals (1991–1994)
- Qin Yong – lead vocals (1994–2005)
- Zhang Kepeng – lead vocals (2005-2013; died 2026)
- Zhang Qi – lead vocals (2013–2023)
