= Di-Dar =

Studio album by Faye Wong
- Released: 22 December 1995
- Genre: Pop; trip hop; dream pop
- Length: 42:50
- Language: Cantonese
- Label: Cinepoly
- Producer: Alvin Leong

Faye Wong chronology
One Person Playing Two Roles (1995)	Di-Dar (1995)	Fuzao (1996)

Di-Dar is the ninth Cantonese studio album by Chinese musician Faye Wong, released on 22 December, 1995, by Cinepoly Records. An eclectic mix of dream pop, psychedelia, and trip hop, the album was a continuation of Wong's experimental efforts, a departure from her previous work under Cantopop and R&B influences. Wong's next record, the dream pop Fuzao (1996), was a culmination of her artistic vision. Di-Dar was Wong's final Cantonese album until Be Perfunctory (2015), a re-release of two extended plays; all of Wong's later albums were recorded in Mandarin with a limited number of Cantonese tracks, primarily alternative versions aimed at the Hong Kong market.

Most of Wong's collaborators on Di-Dar had been involved in her earlier work. Lyricist Lin Xi (Albert Leung) penned nine tracks on the album; songwriter C.Y. Kong, Wong's then-husband Dou Wei, and producer Zhang Yadong made notable contributions. In particular, Wong's work with Lin Xi and Zhang set a precedent for later albums such as Lovers & Strangers (1999).

The album was a commercial success and sold 1.5 millions copies across Asia, with title track "Di-Dar" and "曖昧", both composed by Wong herself, becoming well-known songs. Di-Dar peaked at number one in Hong Kong according to the IFPI and Billboard magazine.

In a retrospective Pitchfork review, Di-Dar is described as "sketch[sic] a deteriorating relationship," with Lin Xi's lyrics "suffusing the album's romanticism with a sense of anxiety and the burning desire to disappear." The album provokes themes of decadence and agitation, with a psychedelic atmosphere presented in uncanny melodies such as that in "迷路."

Deemed one of Wong's most coherent artistic efforts, the dream pop and trip hop elements of Di-Dar would influence her later work such as Fuzao — on which Wong collaborated with her long time influence, the Cocteau Twins — and Fable (2000), the latter of which includes a five-track Buddhist-themed song cycle composed by Wong in the trip hop genre.

== Composition ==
Following Random Thoughts and Please Myself (1994), Wong steered away from the mainstream and instead explored contemporary alternative influences. Di-Dar marked Wong's first attempt in the trip hop scene, then popularized by acts such as Björk and Massive Attack. Including "Di-Dar" and the untitled "(無題)", all tracks are named with two Chinese characters or syllables, an aesthetic preference in several of Wong's albums including Sky (1994). Of the ten tracks on Di-Dar, three are covers, notably with "曖昧" being Wong's second cover of Taiwanese songwriter Salsa Chen's compositions.

== Critical reception ==
Professional ratings
Review scores
Source	Rating
Pitchfork	7.9/10

Di-Dar ranked at number 27 in Ming Pao Weekly's list of "40 Classic Cantopop Albums of the Last 40 Years" published in October 2008. Music journalist Fung Lai-Chee described it as "the best psychedelic and best-selling avant-garde work in Cantonese pop, with songs that are self-centred, ignoring market and others' work. Abstruse, obscure and mysterious."

In a 2023 review of four reissued Wong albums (Please Myself to Fuzao) by Pitchfork, Michael Hong called it Wong's "finest Cantonese album" and "more atmospheric, almost psychedelic" than her previous work.

== Track listing ==
All tracks are written by Lin Xi unless otherwise stated.

Di-Dar – Standard edition
No.	Title	Lyrics	Music	Arrangement	Length
1.	"Di-Dar"		Faye Wong	Dou Wei	2:21
2.	"假期"		Faye Wong	Zhang Yadong	3:55
3.	"迷路"		C.Y. Kong	C.Y. Kong	5:06
4.	"曖昧" (Cover of《情雪》by Tracy Huang)		Salsa Chen	Adrian Chan	4:43
5.	"或者"		Alex San	Alex San	4:29
6.	"我想"		Zhang Yadong	Zhang Yadong	3:38
7.	"享受" (Cover of《あの空に帰ろう》by Shoko Suzuki)		Shoko Suzuki, Masami Tozawa	Adrian Chan	5:10
8.	"一半" (Cover of "Narito Ako" by Viktoria)		Viktoria	Adrian Chan	4:27
9.	"(無題)"		C.Y. Kong	C.Y. Kong	4:21
10.	"流星"	Chow Yiu-fai	Tats Lau	Adrian Chan	4:40
Total length:					42:50

Di-Dar – Japanese edition bonus track
No.	Title	Length
1.	"One Person Playing Two Roles" (一人分飾兩角; Yat Yun Fun Sik Leung Gok)	4:45
Total length:		4:45

== Charts ==
Chart (1996)	Peak position
Hong Kong Albums (IFPI)	1

== Sales and certifications ==
Region	Certification	Certified units/sales
Hong Kong (IFPI Hong Kong)	3× Platinum	150,000^{*}
Summaries
Asia	—	1,500,000
^{*} Sales figures based on certification alone.

== Release history ==
Region	Release date	Label	Format(s)
Hong Kong	22 December 1995	Cinepoly Records	CD; cassette
Taiwan	1996	Linfair Records	CD
China	1996	Jindian Audio and Video	CD; cassette
Japan	25 February 1996	Polydor	CD
Japan	26 September 1997	Polydor	CD (reissue)
Hong Kong	7 May 2003	Cinepoly Records	DSD
Hong Kong	9 September 2004	Cinepoly Records	SACD
Hong Kong	26 October 2010	Universal Music Hong Kong	CD (Golden Disc Anniversary Series)
Hong Kong	12 November 2020	Universal Music Hong Kong	CD (24K Gold series)
Hong Kong	15 December 2021	Universal Music Hong Kong	LP (ARS series)
Japan	27 September 2023	Universal Music Japan	LP
