= Music of Final Fantasy VIII =

Music from the video game Final Fantasy VIII

The music of the video game Final Fantasy VIII was composed by regular series composer Nobuo Uematsu. The Final Fantasy VIII Original Soundtrack, a compilation of all music in the game, was released on four Compact Discs by DigiCube in Japan, and by Square EA in North America. A special orchestral arrangement of selected tracks from the game—arranged by Shirō Hamaguchi—was released under the title Fithos Lusec Wecos Vinosec Final Fantasy VIII, and a collection of piano arrangements—performed by Shinko Ogata—was released under the title Piano Collections Final Fantasy VIII.

The game's soundtrack is best known for two tracks: "Liberi Fatali", a Latin choral piece that is played during the introduction to the game, and "Eyes on Me", a pop ballad serving as the game's theme, performed by Chinese singer Faye Wong. The song's lyrics, written in English by Kako Someya, unveil the hopes of a night club singer for romance with a member of her audience. Reviewers were generally pleased with the music, although several cited issues while comparing the score to previous games or looking at individual tracks.

== Creation and influence ==
Nobuo Uematsu's usual influences include Emerson, Lake & Palmer, Simon and Garfunkel, and Elton John. In regard to Final Fantasy VIII, Uematsu did not prefer to use multiple sources to find MIDI instruments—"I could be coming up with a great melody in the very moment"—instead using a Roland SC-88 synthesizer for the entire score. Uematsu wrote notes based on character designs and screenplays, creating a general picture of the pieces' moods. He could not express a character's emotions solely with plot, instead using images of appearance and attire: "It's important to know when their emotions are at their height, but it usually takes until a month before release for them to finish the ending dialog...!" In response to a question by IGN music stating that the music of Final Fantasy VIII was very dark and perhaps influenced by the plot of the game, Uematsu said that "the atmosphere of music varies depending on story line, of course, but it's also my intention to put various types of music into one game".

Uematsu enjoys writing lyrical pieces, but tries not to be genre-specific. He asserts that expressing the emotions he desires is more important than improving skills: "I think it will be a shame if we won't be able to cry as we play our own game". The absence of character themes was due to him finding those of Final Fantasy VI and VII ineffective. Uematsu considers it reasonable to have character themes if each character has a "highlight" in the game, but he found Final Fantasy VIII only focused on Squall Leonhart and Rinoa Heartilly as a couple, resulting in the "Eyes on Me" theme. The soundtrack features a Latin choral track "Liberi Fatali", which translates to "Fated Children"; its melody forms a musical theme heard in several other pieces in the soundtrack, such as "SeeD" and "The Landing", while the name of "Fithos Lusec Wecos Vinosec" is the recurring lyrics in "Liberi Fatali".

Near the end of the production of Final Fantasy VII, the developers suggested to use a singer, but abandoned the idea due to a lack of reasoning based on the game's theme and storyline. However, Nobuo Uematsu thought a ballad would closely relate to the theme and characters of Final Fantasy VIII. This resulted in the game's developers sharing "countless" artists, eventually deciding on Faye Wong, a Chinese vocalist. Uematsu claims "her voice and mood seem to match my image of the song exactly", and that her ethnicity "fits the international image of Final Fantasy". After negotiations were made, "Eyes on Me" was recorded in Hong Kong with an orchestra.

== Albums ==
=== Final Fantasy VIII Original Soundtrack ===
Final Fantasy VIII Original Soundtrack
- Slipcase artwork for original release

Soundtrack album by Nobuo Uematsu
- Released: March 1, 1999; January 2000 (Music Collection); May 10, 2004 (reissue)
- Recorded: Sound City, Tokyo
- Length: 62:07 (disc one); 62:31 (disc two); 63:38 (disc three); 61:14 (disc four)
- Labels: DigiCube; Square EA (Music Collection); Square Enix (reissue)
- Producer: Nobuo Uematsu

Final Fantasy VIII Original Soundtrack is a soundtrack of the music from Final Fantasy VIII, composed and produced by Nobuo Uematsu. The soundtrack spans four discs and 74 tracks, covering a duration of 4 hours and 9 minutes. It was first published by DigiCube on March 10, 1999 with the catalog number SSCX-10028, and subsequently published by Square Enix on May 10, 2004 with the catalog numbers SQEX-10005~8. Unlike most other Final Fantasy soundtracks, Final Fantasy VIII Original Soundtrack is composed completely of English track names. The album was also released in North America under the title Final Fantasy VIII Music Collection: Music From The Final Fantasy VIII Video Game. It features changes such as packaging design, translation, and additional images. In addition, a limited edition was produced, which has a beige background instead of a full motion video montage.

The soundtrack reached #4 on the Japan Oricon charts, selling over 300,000 copies. It received generally positive reviews from critics; New Zealand PlayStation magazine claimed Final Fantasy VIII has "one of the most memorable scores you will ever hear". Reviewers from multimedia news website IGN stated that much of the game's impact is owed to its "terrific" musical score, but were disappointed by "yet another" variation of the traditional battle theme. IGN later named the FFVIII soundtrack as fourth best in its Final Fantasy Soundtrack Countdown feature. GameSpot considered the game's sound its weakest point, but still commended it, claiming it has "more 'quality' songs than VII". Lastly, Game Revolution wrote that "there are only a few tracks that really stand out", including "Eyes on Me", which it deemed a "clichéd, but beautiful love song".

Final Fantasy VIII Original Soundtrack has sold "more than 300,000 copies" in Japan according to Square, or 259,000 physical copies according to the independent chart company Oricon. Adam Corn of SoundtrackCentral.com claimed the album shows similarities to previous Final Fantasy games, but asserted he was "not overly impressed with this one". A reviewer from Square Enix Music Online claimed the soundtrack is "unique and very special" due to its contrasts, as "when signs of age of the Final Fantasy franchise are shown", Uematsu counterbalances this by creating something "weird and wonderful[...] when the soundtrack becomes too serious, a light-hearted number is inserted to liven up the mood". Ben Schweitzer of RPGFan said in his review of the album that "the main flavor of Uematsu's compositions, his melodic style, remains consistent, and more importantly, consistently good". He criticized, however, the more minimalist pieces, which in his opinion were bland.

Track listing

Disc one
No.	Title	Length
1.	"Liberi Fatali"	3:07
2.	"Balamb GARDEN"	3:29
3.	"Blue Fields"	2:54
4.	"Don't Be Afraid"	2:52
5.	"The Winner"	1:07
6.	"Find Your Way"	3:47
7.	"SeeD"	4:16
8.	"The Landing"	4:36
9.	"Starting Up"	1:19
10.	"Force Your Way"	3:53
11.	"The Loser"	1:26
12.	"Never Look Back"	3:23
13.	"Dead End"	1:11
14.	"Breezy"	2:43
15.	"Shuffle or Boogie"	2:04
16.	"Waltz for the Moon"	3:00
17.	"Tell Me"	3:24
18.	"Fear"	2:24
19.	"The Man with the Machine Gun"	2:49
20.	"Julia"	1:23
21.	"Roses and Wine"	2:18
22.	"Junction"	1:37
23.	"Timber Owls"	2:51

Disc two
No.	Title	Length
1.	"My Mind"	3:12
2.	"The Mission"	3:36
3.	"Martial Law"	3:48
4.	"Cactus Jack (Galbadian Anthem)"	1:30
5.	"Only a Plank Between One and Perdition"	2:24
6.	"SUCCESSION OF WITCHES"	3:18
7.	"Galbadia GARDEN"	3:37
8.	"Unrest"	2:36
9.	"Under Her Control"	3:30
10.	"The Stage is Set"	3:39
11.	"A Sacrifice"	3:26
12.	"FITHOS LUSEC WECOS VINOSEC"	4:33
13.	"Intruders"	2:31
14.	"Premonition"	4:36
15.	"Wounded"	0:53
16.	"Fragments of Memories"	3:13
17.	"Jailed"	3:50
18.	"Rivals"	3:30
19.	"Ami"	4:37

Disc three
No.	Title	Length
1.	"The Spy"	3:46
2.	"Retaliation"	0:45
3.	"Movin'"	5:18
4.	"Blue Sky"	0:44
5.	"Drifting"	2:56
6.	"Heresy"	4:10
7.	"Fisherman's Horizon"	3:35
8.	"ODEKA ke Chocobo"	1:16
9.	"Where I Belong"	3:40
10.	"The Oath"	3:25
11.	"Slide Show Part 1"	1:23
12.	"Slide Show Part 2"	1:47
13.	"Love Grows"	4:28
14.	"The Salt Flats"	3:36
15.	"Trust Me"	3:13
16.	"Silence and Motion"	5:47
17.	"Dance with the Balamb-Fish"	3:39
18.	"Tears of the Moon"	1:12
19.	"Residents"	3:06
20.	"Eyes on Me"	5:38

Disc four
No.	Title	Length
1.	"Mods de Chocobo (featuring N's Telecaster)"	2:24
2.	"Ride On"	3:03
3.	"Truth"	3:40
4.	"Lunatic Pandora"	3:28
5.	"Compression of Time"	4:34
6.	"The Castle"	5:19
7.	"The Legendary Beast"	5:50
8.	"Maybe I'm a Lion"	5:35
9.	"The Extreme"	6:44
10.	"The Successor"	3:37
11.	"Ending Theme"	13:20
12.	"Overture"	3:36

=== Fithos Lusec Wecos Vinosec Final Fantasy VIII ===
Fithos Lusec Wecos Vinosec Final Fantasy VIII

Soundtrack album by Nobuo Uematsu
- Released: November 19, 1999; July 22, 2004
- Length: 1:04:12
- Labels: DigiCube; Square Enix (reissue)

Fithos Lusec Wecos Vinosec Final Fantasy VIII is a collection of orchestrated pieces originally from Final Fantasy VIII, arranged by Shirō Hamaguchi. It also includes three unchanged tracks from Final Fantasy VIII Original Soundtrack; "Liberi Fatali", "Eyes on Me", and "Ending Theme". The album spans 13 tracks, totaling 1:04:12. It was first published on November 19, 1999 by DigiCube with the catalog number SSCX-10037, and subsequently published on July 22, 2004 by Square Enix with the catalog number SQEX-10025.

The album reached #59 on the Japan Oricon charts, selling 7,540 copies. Adam Corn of SoundtrackCentral.com claimed "the superior instrumental quality, well-done arrangements, and tasteful selection of themes boost the [Original Soundtrack's] qualities while hiding its flaws", elaborating that "even people such as myself who are not fans of the original will be impressed by its prowess, and fans will simply be enamored". Neal Chandran of RPGFan was similarly impressed, saying that it was "a very good soundtrack" and that its tracks sounded "more beautiful than the original version". His primary complaint was that he would have liked for the album to include more pieces.

Track listing
No.	Title	Length
1.	"Liberi Fatali"	3:08
2.	"Blue Fields"	3:38
3.	"Don't Be Afraid"	3:49
4.	"Balamb GARDEN ~ Ami"	5:16
5.	"Fisherman's Horizon"	4:01
6.	"FITHOS LUSEC WECOS VINOSEC"	4:38
7.	"Eyes on Me"	5:43
8.	"The Man with the Machine Gun"	3:36
9.	"Dance with the Balamb-Fish"	3:16
10.	"Love Grows"	4:35
11.	"The Oath"	5:09
12.	"Ending Theme"	13:22
13.	"Fragments of Memories"	4:05

=== Piano Collections Final Fantasy VIII ===
Piano Collections Final Fantasy VIII

Soundtrack album by Nobuo Uematsu, Shirō Hamaguchi
- Released: January 21, 2000; July 22, 2004
- Length: 48:03
- Labels: DigiCube; Square Enix (reissue)

Piano Collections Final Fantasy VIII is an album of piano arrangements from Final Fantasy VIII, arranged by Shirō Hamaguchi and performed by Shinko Ogata. Its 13 tracks span a duration of 48:03. It was published by DigiCube on January 21, 2000 with the catalog number SSCX-10041 and subsequently re-published by Square Enix on July 22, 2004 with the catalog number SQEX-10026.

Robert Steen of SoundtrackCentral.com commended the performance, claiming "Shinko Ogata seems to be a very capable player" and noted that although the arrangements are similar to the original pieces, they "breathe new life into the songs". Ryan Bradley of RPGFan also appreciated the album, saying that "the piano really brings out the emotion in some of the songs" and that the pieces transitioned smoothly to piano. Patrick Gann agreed, saying that it was one of his favorite albums and that Hamaguchi's arrangements were "wonderful".

Track listing
No.	Title	Length
1.	"Blue Fields"	3:19
2.	"Eyes on Me"	3:26
3.	"Fisherman's Horizon"	3:58
4.	"SUCCESSION OF WITCHES"	3:49
5.	"Ami"	3:34
6.	"Shuffle or Boogie"	2:53
7.	"Find Your Way"	3:44
8.	"The Oath"	3:57
9.	"Silence and Motion"	3:20
10.	"The Castle"	3:43
11.	"The Successor"	5:05
12.	"Ending Theme"	5:40
13.	"Slide Show Part 2"	1:35

== Eyes on Me ==
"Eyes on Me"

Single by Faye Wong

from the album Sing and Play
- Released: February 24, 1999
- Genre: Pop
- Label: Toshiba-EMI
- Songwriters: Kako Someya (lyrics); Nobuo Uematsu (music)

"Eyes on Me" is the ballad that serves as the theme of the game Final Fantasy VIII. It was performed by Chinese singer Faye Wong and composed, like the rest of the game music, by Nobuo Uematsu. Within the game, the song is written by Julia Heartilly, a pianist who is the love interest of Laguna Loire. The lyrics, written in imperfect English, unveil the hopes of a night club singer for romance with a member of her audience. It is heard repeatedly throughout the game in various incarnations, including as an instrumental piece entitled "Julia", as well as in "Waltz for the Moon" and "Love Grows" for the "love" scenes between Squall Leonheart and Rinoa Heartlily.

Near the end of the production of Final Fantasy VII, the developers suggested to use a song with lyrics, but abandoned the idea when they could not connect the idea to the game's themes and story. Uematsu, however, thought a ballad would work. This resulted in the game's developers sharing "countless" artists, eventually deciding on Faye Wong, a Chinese vocalist. Uematsu claimed "her voice and mood seem to match my image of the song exactly", and that her ethnicity "fits the international image of Final Fantasy". After negotiations were made, "Eyes on Me" was recorded in Hong Kong with an orchestra. IGN claimed that she was reportedly paid $1 million US dollars for her work. It was the first Final Fantasy pop ballad.

It was released as a CD single in Japan, including an instrumental version and Wong's ballad "Red Beans" (simplified Chinese: 红豆; traditional Chinese: 紅豆; pinyin: hóng dòu), composed by Jim Lau with Mandarin lyrics by Lin Xi. The Japanese title for that song was "Akashia no Mi" (アカシアの実, "Acacia Seeds"). It had been included in Faye Wong's 1998 album Sing and Play, along with a Cantonese version "Repayment" (simplified Chinese: 偿还; traditional Chinese: 償還; Jyutping: seung^{4} waan^{4}), and was popular in its own right. The single sold more than 500,000 copies, making it the highest-selling video game music disc ever released up until 2002, with the release of "Hikari" by Hikaru Utada for Kingdom Hearts. "Eyes on Me" was the first video game song to win an award at the Japan Gold Disc Awards, winning "Song of the Year (Western Music)" at the 14th Annual awards in 1999. The single reached #9 on the Oricon charts, and stayed on the charts for 20 weeks. The song also charted in the US on the Billboard Hot 100, debuted at 88 and peaked at 67 staying on the chart for 2 weeks.

The song was popular among the video game community in the Western world, and brought Faye Wong to the attention of many who were not previously familiar with her music. In 2017, Brian Ashcraft from Kotaku described "Eyes on Me" as one of the most iconic songs of the Final Fantasy franchise, as well as one of the most commercially successful singles associated with the video game industry.

A happy hardcore remix was recorded for the 2000 Dancemania compilation Speed 4, and on the Dancemania Speed Best 2001 of the Dancemania Speed series. There is another dance remix of the song made by Almighty, later included on the Japanese release of Wong's 2000 album Fable, Dancemania X5, and Dancemania Diamond Complete Edition (Millennium Hits Collection). In 2004, a Japanese-language version entitled "Summer Album" (夏のアルバム, "Natsu no Arubamu") with lyrics by Kazushige Nojima was included on Final Fantasy Song Book: Mahoroba.

"Eyes on Me" was re-released on a 18 cm vinyl record on November 3, 2017.

The original song was also covered by Angela Aki for release on her 2006 single "Kokoro no Senshi", with minor grammatical changes. In an Excite Japan interview, Aki said that her version 'shed light on "Eyes on Me"'.

Track listing
No.	Title	Length
1.	"Eyes on Me"	5:36
2.	"Akashia no Mi (アカシアの実, Acacia Seeds)"	4:15
3.	"Eyes on Me (Instrumental)"	5:42

=== Charts ===
==== Weekly charts ====
Chart (1999)	Peak position
Billboard Hot 100	67
Oricon Singles Chart	9

==== Year-end charts ====
Chart (1999)	Peak position
Oricon Singles Chart	62

=== Certifications ===
Region	Certification	Certified units/sales
Japan (RIAJ)	3× Platinum	300,000^{^}
^{^} Shipments figures based on certification alone.

== Legacy ==
The music of Final Fantasy VIII has often been met with critical acclaim, often recognized for its unique and experimental sound at the time. The game's music has appeared in various official Final Fantasy concerts. These include 2002's 20020220 Music from FINAL FANTASY, in which the Tokyo Philharmonic Orchestra played "Liberi Fatali", "Don't Be Afraid", "Love Grows", and "The Man with the Machine Gun", the 2004 Tour de Japon series, which featured "The Oath", the Dear Friends series that began that same year and included "Liberi Fatali" and "Love Grows", and the 2005 More Friends concert, which included "Maybe I'm a Lion". More recent concerts include the Voices - Music from Final Fantasy 2006 concert showcasing "Liberi Fatali", "Fisherman's Horizon", and "Eyes on Me" and the international Distant Worlds concert tour that continues to date, which includes "Liberi Fatali", "Fisherman's Horizon", "Man with the Machine Gun", and "Love Grows". Several of these concerts have produced live albums as well. Music from the game has also been played in non Final Fantasy-specific concerts such as the Play! A Video Game Symphony world tour from 2006 onwards, for which Nobuo Uematsu composed the opening fanfare that accompanies each performance.

"Eyes on Me" was popular among gamers in the West, and brought Faye Wong to the attention of many who were not previously familiar with her music. It was covered by Angela Aki for release on her 2006 single "Kokoro no Senshi". Covers by Kanon and Susan Calloway were also made; these singers also collaborated with Nobuo Uematsu on The Last Story and Final Fantasy XIV respectively, with Calloway chosen due to her Final Fantasy covers. The singer MayBee covered a Korean language version of the song. The song was played at the Fantasy Comes Alive concert in Singapore on April 30, 2010.

Music from the original soundtrack has been arranged for the piano and published by DOREMI Music Publishing. All of the pieces in the book have been rewritten by Asako Niwa as beginning to intermediate-level piano solos, though they are meant to sound as much like the originals as possible. "Best of" collections from the series including Final Fantasy VIII and arrangements for guitar solos and piano duets are also available. Additionally, the actual piano sheet music from the Piano Collections Final Fantasy VIII album has been published as a corresponding music book by Yamaha Music Media. The book contains the original music, exactly as arranged and performed on the albums. Unlike the Original Score arrangements, these pieces are intended only for advanced players as they are generally more difficult.

The Black Mages, a band that arranges music from Final Fantasy video games into a rock music style, has arranged five pieces from Final Fantasy VIII. These are "Force Your Way" from The Black Mages, published in 2003, "The Man with the Machine Gun" and "Maybe I'm a Lion", from The Black Mages II: The Skies Above, published in 2004, and "The Extreme" and "Premonition" from The Black Mages III: Darkness and Starlight. The Black Mages performed "Maybe I'm a Lion" at the Extra: Hyper Game Music Event 2007 concert in Tokyo on July 7, 2007. In the 2004 Summer Olympics, the American synchronized swimming duo consisting of Alison Bartosik and Anna Kozlova were awarded the bronze medal for their performance to the pieces "Fithos Lusec Wecos Vinosec" and "Liberi Fatali".
