= Eyes on Me (Faye Wong song) =

- "Eyes on Me" CD single cover

Single by Faye Wong

from the album Sing and Play
- B-side: "Red Beans"
- Released: February 24, 1999
- Genre: Pop
- Label: Toshiba-EMI
- Composer: Nobuo Uematsu
- Lyricist: Kako Someya

"Eyes on Me" is a song by Chinese recording artist Faye Wong as a love theme for the video game Final Fantasy VIII. It was released on February 24, 1999, as the first Final Fantasy pop ballad. The song was composed by Nobuo Uematsu with English lyrics written by Kako Someya.

== Background and release ==
The song was released as a CD single in Japan on February 24, 1999. The B-side was a ballad, "Red Bean" (simplified Chinese: 红豆; traditional Chinese: 紅豆; pinyin: hóng dòu), composed by Jim Lau with Mandarin lyrics by Lin Xi. The Japanese title for it was "Akashia no Mi" (アカシアの実, "Acacia Seeds"). It had been included in Faye Wong's 1998 album Sing and Play, along with a Cantonese version "Repayment" (simplified Chinese: 偿还; traditional Chinese: 償還; Jyutping: seung^{4} waan^{4}), and was popular in its own right. "Eyes on Me" was re-released on a 18 cm vinyl record on November 3, 2017.

== Composition ==
"Eyes on Me" was composed by Nobuo Uematsu with English lyrics by Kako Someya. It was the first pop ballad song in the Final Fantasy series. It was performed by singer Faye Wong. The main theme of Final Fantasy VIII was used for the song's melody.

== Reception ==
=== Critical reception ===
Square Enix Music Online writer Dave felt "Eyes on Me" was both "overhyped and overcriticized" since it was "ultimately a replica". He called it "enjoyable, fitting, [and] beautiful", though also "unremarkable". In 2020, Lisa Cam of the South China Morning Post listed the song as one of Faye's best, noting it had been a "matter of national pride" that she had performed the end theme for "arguably one of the most popular RPGs of the 1990s".

=== Commercial performance ===
Upon the song's release in Japan, it placed number one on the Oricon Western Singles Chart for 19 consecutive weeks, and generated lifetime sales of over 500,000 copies, placing it as the best-selling video game music disc ever released in Japan until the release of "Hikari" by Utada Hikaru for Kingdom Hearts. In 2000, it was the first song in video game history to win an award at the 14th Annual Japan Gold Disc Awards, where it won "Song of the Year (Western Music)".

The song was popular among the video game community in the Western world, and brought Faye Wong to the attention of many who were not previously familiar with her music. In 2017, Brian Ashcraft from Kotaku described "Eyes on Me" as one of the most iconic songs of the Final Fantasy franchise, as well as one of the most commercially successful singles associated with the video game industry.

== Theme song in the game ==
Near the end of the production of Final Fantasy VII, the developers suggested to use a singer, but abandoned the idea due to a lack of reasoning based on the game's theme and storyline. However, Nobuo Uematsu thought that a ballad would closely relate to the theme and characters of Final Fantasy VIII. This resulted in the game's developers sharing "countless" artists, ultimately deciding on Faye Wong, a Chinese vocalist. Uematsu claims "her voice and mood seem to match my image of the song exactly", and that her non-Japanese nationality "fits the international image of Final Fantasy". After negotiations were made, "Eyes on Me" was recorded in Hong Kong with an orchestra. IGN claimed that she was reportedly paid $1 million US dollars for her work.

The lyrics, written in imperfect English, unveil the hopes of a night club singer for romance with a member of her audience. Within Final Fantasy VIII, the song is written by Julia Heartilly, a pianist who is a love interest of Laguna Loire. It is heard repeatedly throughout the game in various incarnations as an instrumental piece, including a version entitled Julia. Its full version is heard during a pivotal moment between Squall Leonhart and Rinoa Heartilly—the main protagonists—on board the Ragnarok. An orchestrated version of the theme plays once more during the game's ending.

== Covers and other versions ==
A happy hardcore remix was recorded for the 2000 Dancemania compilation Speed 4, and on the Dancemania Speed Best 2001 of the Dancemania Speed series. There is another dance remix of the song made by Almighty, later included on the Japanese release of Wong's 2000 album Fable, Dancemania X5, and Dancemania Diamond Complete Edition (Millennium Hits Collection).

In 2004, a Japanese version sung by Manami Kiyota titled "Summer Album" (夏のアルバム, "Natsu no Arubamu") with lyrics by Kazushige Nojima was included on Final Fantasy Song Book: Mahoroba. The original song was also covered by Angela Aki for release on her 2006 single "Kokoro no Senshi", with minor grammatical changes. In an Excite Japan interview, Aki said Uematsu had told her that her version 'shed light on "Eyes on Me"'. Covers by Kanon and Susan Calloway were also created. The singer MayBee covered a Korean language version of the song.

== Track listing ==
No.	Title	Length
1.	"Eyes on Me"	5:36
2.	"Red Beans"	4:15
3.	"Eyes on Me (Instrumental)"	5:42

== Charts ==
=== Weekly charts ===
Chart (1999)	Peak position
Japan (Oricon)	9
Japan Western Singles (Oricon)	1
Taiwan (IFPI)	1

=== Year-end charts ===
Chart (1999)	Position
Japan Singles (Oricon)	62

== Certifications ==
Region	Certification	Certified units/sales
Japan (RIAJ)	3× Platinum	300,000^{^}
^{^} Shipments figures based on certification alone.

== See also ==
- Music of Final Fantasy VIII
