= Spoilsport =

Spoilsport or spoil sport may refer to:

- Spoilsport (Transformers)
- "Spoilsport", a song on the 1996 Faye Wong album Fuzao
- "Spoilsport", a 2016 episode of Shawn the Sheep
- "Spoil Sport", a 1961 episode of Popeye the Sailor
- "Spoil Sport", a 1998 episode of Elliot Moose
