= Sing and Play =

Studio album by Faye Wong
- Released: October 2, 1998
- Recorded: 1998
- Studio: Avon Recording Studios (Hong Kong)
- Genres: Mandopop; Cantopop
- Length: 44:39
- Label: EMI
- Producers: Faye Wong; Alvin Leong

Faye Wong chronology
Faye Wong (1997)	Sing and Play (1998)	Lovers & Strangers (1999)

Sing and Play (Chinese: 唱遊; pinyin: Chàng Yóu) is the sixth Mandarin-language studio album (fifteenth overall) by Chinese singer Faye Wong. It includes 10 tracks in Mandarin, with a bonus disc of 3 Cantonese tracks. It was released on October 2, 1998, in the Greater China region. On October 21, 1998, it was released in Japan. Wong and Alvin Leong served as the album's executive producers.

Sing and Play was the first C-pop album to be recorded using HDCD technology. The overall style of the album is atmospheric and lively, making extensive use of techniques such as bel canto, vibrato, vocal fry and breathy vocals. Commercially, Sing and Play fared very well, with cumulative sales in Asia exceeding 2.5 million copies.

== Background and composition ==
Sing and Play was the first Chinese album recorded using HDCD techniques, and the creative team still used partners such as Albert Leung, Adrian Chan, Xin Weili, and Jiang Zhiren. The conceptual positioning of the album is fanciful and unrestrained. Wong not only served as the producer of the album, she also once again composed four tracks: "Emotional Life", "Face", "Whimsical" and "Child". Among them, the song "Face" is Wong's first work performed with a "Bel canto-like" singing method, and "Child" is the first work that Wong and Dou Wei dedicated to their daughter Leah Dou. The song is arranged by Dou Wei and was also the only work on the album that Wong personally wrote the lyrics for. Leah Dou, who could not speak yet, also tried to talk for the first time in the song.

The three Cantonese songs in the album were all composed by prolific lyricist Albert Leung, who also re-composed the three Mandarin songs in the album into Cantonese. Leung is responsible for almost all of the lyrics in Sing and Play. Among them, numbers such as "Repay" and "Love Commandment" use parallelism to describe love. When Leung wrote the song "Red Beans", his inspiration came from the scene where the lovelorn heroine in the Japanese drama Love Generation boiled red beans. Before the red beans are cooked, the heroine was thinking of breaking up. In this way, the dorama's plot worked its way into the song's lyric: "I haven't boiled the red beans into a lingering wound for you". Jim Lau himself admires Wong's voice very much. When he composed the music for "Red Beans", he imagined how Wong would sing based on her voice, so the song was composed in less than a few minutes, breaking his fastest songwriting record.

Pan Xieqing, the composer who collaborated with Wong for the first time in the album, created two works, "Give Up Halfway" and "Fly". Among them, "Fly" pays tribute to Chang Yu-sheng's work. The song "Our Lord", which was lyricized by Wyman Wong, was written by Zhang Yadong for Xu Wei when he was working on an album for Wong. It was later included in the album and Xu Wei was paid more than 10,000 yuan in royalties.

== Title and artwork ==
The album title is usually translated as Sing and Play in English sources. Others refer to the album as Song Tour (遊 can mean tour), Scenic Tour which was the name of Wong's 1998–1999 concert tour, Love Life, or Song Play.

The album cover is a "sunburned" headshot of Wong designed by Thomas Chan, while the album booklet features photos that are inspired by movies like The Fifth Element and Jurassic Park. Wong's sunburned makeup look on the cover also triggered a wave of imitations in the entertainment industry.

== Reception ==
The album debuted at number three, respectively, in Hong Kong on the week of October 4 and in Malaysia on the week of October 13, 1998. It peaked at number one in Malaysia on the week of October 20, 1998. It reached number two in Hong Kong on the week of October 11, 1998. Billboard's Asia bureau chief, Steve McClure, placed it in number seven of his top ten list of 1999 Asian albums.

Wong's first "Bel Canto-like" performance on the song "Face" was well received, and her producer status was recognized for the first time, which led her to be shortlisted for the Taiwan Golden Melody Award for Best Record Producer at the 10th Golden Melody Awards. The album was noted for some of its ballads, in contrast to the pop songs which had provided most of Wong's hits around that time. "Red Beans", "Face" and "Love Commandments" have been popular songs of the album.

As of February 1999, the album sold almost 2,500,000 copies worldwide, including imports. It was rereleased in Japan on March 3, 1999, with the bonus track, "Eyes on Me". The Japanese release reached No. 38 on the Oricon Albums Chart and charted for 12 weeks.

== Track listing ==
Sing and Play – Standard edition
No.	Title	Lyrics	Music	Chinese titles	Length
1.	"Emotional Life" (or "Sensational Life")	Albert Leung	Faye Wong	感情生活; Gǎnqíng shēnghuó	5:15
2.	"Face (Note: The word refers to the social concept)"	Albert Leung	Faye Wong	臉; Liǎn	3:34
3.	"Sex Commandments"	Albert Leung	Adrian Chan (陳偉文)	色誡; Sè Jiè	4:53
4.	"Give Up Half Way"	Pan Xieqing (潘協慶)	Pan Xieqing	半途而廢; Bàntúérfèi	3:32
5.	"Fly"	Pan Xieqing	Pan Xieqing	飛; Fēi	5:41
6.	"Our Lord"	Wyman Wong	Xu Wei	祢; Nǐ (Note: The word is only used to address deities)	4:22
7.	"Whimsical" (or "A Little Wit", "A Little Cunning", "Clever-Clever", "Sharp but Petty" and "Mortal Wisdom")	Albert Leung	Faye Wong	小聰明; Xiǎo Cōngming	4:02
8.	"Wake Up" (or "Wakeless", "Not Awake" and "Not Waking Up")	Chiu Li-Kwan	Jack Wu (Jack吳2)	醒不來; Xǐng Bù Lái	4:03
9.	"Red Beans"	Albert Leung	Jim Lau	紅豆; Hóngdòu	4:15
10.	"Child (Note: Part of the name of Wong's daughter Leah Dou; the word also means child)"	Faye Wong	Faye Wong	童; Tóng	4:41
Total length:					44：37

Hong Kong edition and Taiwan deluxe edition bonus disc
No.	Title	Lyrics	Music	Chinese titles	Length
1.	"Yuen leung chi gei" ("Forgive Myself", "Pardon Myself" or "Excuse Myself")	Albert Leung	Pan Xieqing	原諒自己; jyun^{4} loeng^{6} zi^{6} gei^{2}	3:39
2.	"Seung waan" ("Repay" or "Reimburse")	Albert Leung	Jim Lau	償還; soeng^{4} waan^{4}	4:17
3.	"Love Commandments"	Albert Leung	Adrian Chan	情誡; cing^{4} gaai^{3}	4:17
Total length:					12:13

1998 Japanese edition bonus track
No.	Title	Chinese title	Length
11.	"Ma zui (Remix)" ("Numbness" or "Anesthesia")	麻醉	4:09
Total length:			4:09

1999 Japanese reissue bonus tracks
No.	Title	Length
12.	"Eyes on Me" (featured in Final Fantasy VIII)	5:43
13.	"Yuen leung chi gei"	3:39
14.	"Seung waan"	4:17
15.	"Love Commandments"	4:17
Total length:		17:56

== Charts ==
=== Weekly charts ===
Chart (1998)	Peak position
Hong Kong Albums (IFPI)	2
Japanese Albums (Oricon)	38
Malaysian Albums (RIM)	1
Taiwanese Albums (IFPI Taiwan)	5

=== Year-end charts ===
Chart (1998)	Position
Singaporean Albums (SPVA)	1

== Certifications and sales ==
Region	Certification	Certified units/sales
Japan (RIAJ)	Gold	100,000^{^}
Summaries
Worldwide	—	2,500,000
^{^} Shipments figures based on certification alone.
