= Shirley Wong (album) =

Studio album by Faye Wong
- Released: 2 November 1989
- Recorded: 1989
- Genre: Cantopop
- Label: Cinepoly

Faye Wong chronology
Shirley Wong (1989)	Everything (1990)

Shirley Wong is the debut Cantonese studio album by Chinese singer Faye Wong. Using the stage name Shirley Wong, the album was released on 2 November 1989, through Cinepoly.

== Track listing ==
1. 無奈那天 (Mou Noi Naa Tin) - "However That Day"
2. 藉口 (Ze Hau) - "Excuses"
3. 有緣的話 (Jau Jyun Dik Waa) - "If Destined"
4. 溫柔的手 (Wan Jau Dik Sau) - "Delicate Hands"
5. 尾班車 (Mei Baan Ce) - "Last Train"
6. 未平復的心 (Mei Ping Fuk Dik Sam) - "The Unsettled Heart" (duet with Paul Wong)
7. 仍是舊句子 (Jing Si Gau Geoi Zi) - "Still the Same Old Phrase"
8. 中間人 (Zung Gaan Jan) - "Torn Between Two Lovers"
9. 愛聽謊言 (Oi Ting Fong Jin) - "Like Listening to Lies"
10. 新生 (San Sang) - "New Life"
