= Leah Dou =

Chinese singer-songwriter and actress (born 1997)

Dou Jingtong
- 窦靖童
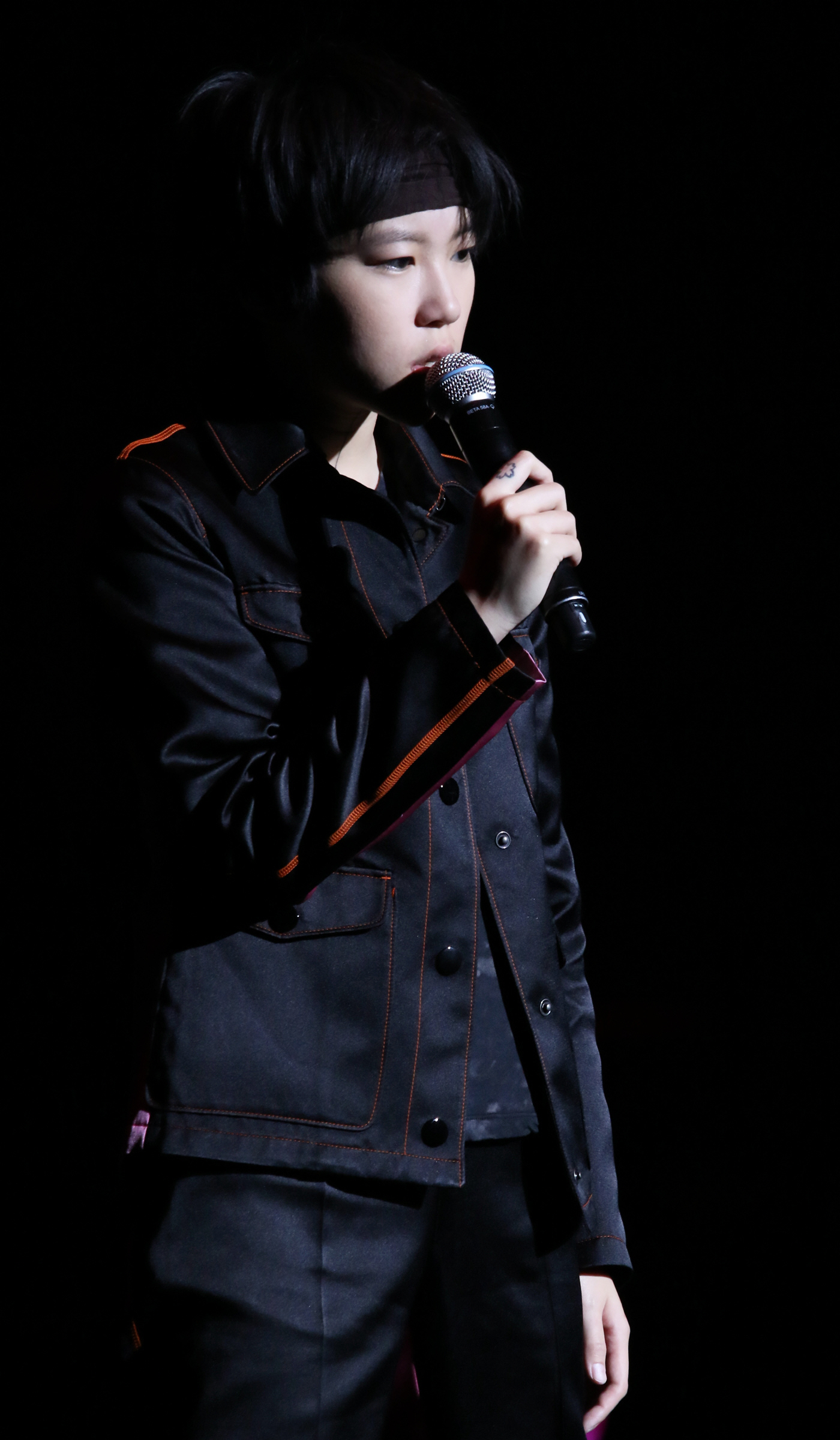
- Dou performing in 2016
- Born: 3 January 1997 (age 29); Dongcheng District, Beijing, China
- Parents: Dou Wei (father); Faye Wong (mother)
- Relatives: Li Yan (half sister); Dou Jiayuan (half sister)

Chinese name
- Traditional Chinese: 竇靖童
- Simplified Chinese: 窦靖童
Transcriptions
Standard Mandarin
- Hanyu Pinyin: Dòu Jìngtóng

Dou Jingtong (born 3 January 1997), also known as Leah Dou, is a Chinese singer-songwriter and actress. She is the daughter of the singers Dou Wei and Faye Wong.

== Music career ==
Dou first contributed her voice to her mother's song "童" (Tong) when she was 1 year old.

In 2011, Dou formed her first band and became the lead singer. In 2012, she released her first song "With You". In 2013, she launched second personal original single "On the Beach", in the same year, she released third personal original single "Blue Flamingo". She debuted in 2015 in a performance in Tokyo. Later in Clockenflap 2015, she debuted in Hong Kong. She released her first single River Run on December 11, 2015, selling 25,000 copies on QQ Music in three days. Her second single Brother was released in 2016 for a Chinese Shu Uemura campaign. Both songs were included on her first album, Stone Café released on April 22, 2016. Same year, she won the QQ New Female Artist Of The Year.

Dou released her second album Kids Only in September 2017 and her third album Spring Outing in April 2023. In 2024, she embarked on her first tour Out of the Loop (狀況外) in Shanghai, with future shows scheduled in Taiwan, North America, and Singapore. Her mother Faye Wong attended her Beijing show where Dou covered Wong's song "You Are Happy So I Am Happy" (你快樂所以我快樂).

On July 11, 2025, Dou released her first duet with her mother, "You Are Also Here" (你也在这里), as the theme song of the web series Her Way of Survival, in which Dou stars.

== Acting career ==
Dou had a supporting role in the 2019 film The Eleventh Chapter, for which she won Best Supporting Actress at the 9th Beijing International Film Festival and was nominated as Best New Performer at the 30th Huading Awards.

In 2021, she starred in and composed music for the film Bipolar. It screened at the Vancouver International Film Festival on October 3. Dou received praise for her "bewitching screen presence".

In 2023, she was cast in the Tencent web series Her Way of Survival.

== Personal life ==
Dou has two half sisters, Li Yan (李嫣), the daughter of her mother Faye Wong and her stepfather Li Yapeng, and Dou Jiayuan (窦佳嫄), the daughter of her father Dou Wei and her stepmother Gao Yuan (高原). Dou and her half sister Li Yan and her mother Faye Wong were all born at Peking Union Medical College Hospital in Dongcheng District, Beijing.

Before reaching her current level of fame, Dou spent two years studying at Berklee College of Music, before withdrawing from school to couch-surf in Los Angeles.

Dou is well-known for her androgynous appearance in China and has a substantial following of female fans, with the nickname "People's husband" (国民老公).

== Discography ==
=== Albums ===
Title	Label	Release Date	Track listing
Stone Café	Grey Waters	2016.4.22	1. My Days; 2. Bitter Sweet; 3. Waiting On Gregory; 4. Lola; 5. The Way; 6. Explosions; 7. Drive; 8. River Run; 9. May Rain; 10. Chimes; 11. Blue Flamingo (Bonus Track); 12. Brother (Japanese bonus track); 13. Dreams (Japanese bonus track)
Kids Only	Grey Waters	2017.9.19	1. Wu; 2. Kids Only; 3. Whister's Riddle; 4. No Crisis; 5. Interlude; 6. Jungle Pink; 7. Blooming; 8. Kids Only Anthem; 9. Cherry Blossom Tree; 10. July
春游(Chun You/Spring Outing)	Grey Waters	2023.4.24	1. 早上好(Good Morning); 2. Monday(feat. Lionman); 3. 北京！咖啡！(Beijing! Coffee!); 4. 橘子汽水(Orange Juice); 5. 中场休息(Halftime); 6. 狗熊(Black Bear); 7. 烟花(Fireworks); 8. 河流(River); 9. Hello; 10. 同一片天空下(Under the Same Sky)
空中飞人(Kong Zhong Fei Ren/In the Air)	Grey Waters	2024.9.09	1. 飞咯 (Flying); 2. 云朵 (feat. 九维) (Cloud); 3. 太阳升起 (The Sun Rises); 4. California Baby; 5. 早知道 (I knew it); 6. 空中飞人 (In the Air); 7. 可怜的东西 (feat. 魏如萱) (Poor Thing); 8. Little Love Song; 9. 我 (Me); 10. Lift Off

=== EPs ===
Title	Label	Release Date	Track listing
My Days	Universal Music Japan	2016.4.27	1. My Days; 2. River Run; 3. Brother; 4. My Days (instrumental); 5. River Run (instrumental); 6. Brother (instrumental)

=== Singles ===
Release Date	Title	Label
2016.9.2	(It's not a crime) It's just what we do	Grey Waters
2017.8.30	See You Again	Grey Waters
2018.8.11	Island Love	Grey Waters

=== Other original songs ===
- "With You"
- "On the Beach"

== Awards and nominations ==
Year	Award	Category	Work	Result	Ref.
2016	QQ Music Awards	New Female Artist of the Year		Won	
2016	QQ Music Awards	QQ Music Most Searched Artist of the Year		Won	
2016	53rd Golden Horse Awards	Best Original Film Song	(It’s Not A Crime) It’s Just What We Do for the film Soul Mate	Nominated	
2017	36th Hong Kong Film Awards	Best Original Film Song	(It’s Not A Crime) It’s Just What We Do for the film Soul Mate	Nominated	
2019	9th Beijing International Film Festival	Best Supporting Actress	The Eleventh Chapter	Won	
2021	30th Huading Awards	Best New Performer	The Eleventh Chapter	Nominated	
2021	Berlin Music Video Awards	Best Experimental	CATS	Nominated	

== See also ==
- Sing and Play — the final track "Tong" features Dou's voice when she was 1
- Lovers & Strangers — the title track "Zhi Ai Mosheng Ren" features Dou's voice when she was 2

== Sources ==
- Hsia, Heidi (2015-08-10). "Leah Dou performs in Tokyo". Yahoo! Singapore. Archived from the original on 2016-01-29.
