= Everything (Faye Wong album) =

Studio album by Faye Wong
- Released: June 1990
- Genre: Cantopop
- Label: Cinepoly

Faye Wong chronology
Shirley Wong (1989)	Everything (1990)	You're The Only One (1990)

Everything is the second Cantonese studio album by Chinese singer Faye Wong, released in June 1990 under Cinepoly. It was recorded when the singer was based in Hong Kong, using the stage name Shirley Wong (王靖雯; Wong Ching Man).

== Songs ==
The title song is a Cantonese version of Jody Watley's 1989 hit of the same name. "Wailing Wall" is a cover of Marilyn Martin's 1988 B-side "Quiet Desperation".

== Track listing ==
1. 巴黎塔尖 (Baa Lai Taap Zim) - Paris Eiffel Tower Tip
2. "Everything"
3. 遊蕩 (Jau Dong) - Roaming
4. 可否抱緊我 (Ho Fau Pou Gan Ngo) - Can You Hold Me Tight
5. 鬥快說笑話 (Dau Faai Syut Siu Waa) - Competing To Joke Quickly
6. My Loneliness
7. 哭牆 (Huk Coeng) - Wailing Wall
8. 無悔今夜 (Mou Fui Gam Je) - No Regrets Tonight
9. 一剎那 (Jat Saat Naa) - In A Flash
10. 激流 (Gik Lau) - Upstream
11. 巴黎塔尖 (Baa Lai Taap Zim) - Paris Eiffel Tower Tip (Reprise)
