= Lovers & Strangers =

1999 album by Faye Wong

Studio album by Faye Wong
- Released: September 10, 1999
- Recorded: 1999
- Studios: Avon Recording Studios (Hong Kong); A-Room Studio (Hong Kong); CTPC Studio (Beijing)
- Genres: Mandopop; Cantopop; rock
- Length: 53:34
- Languages: Mandarin, Cantonese
- Label: EMI
- Producer: Alvin Leong

Faye Wong chronology
Sing and Play (1998)	Lovers & Strangers (1999)	Fable (2000)

Lovers & Strangers
- Traditional Chinese: 只愛陌生人
- Simplified Chinese: 只爱陌生人
Transcriptions
Standard Mandarin
- Hanyu Pinyin: zhǐ ài mòshēngrén

Lovers & Strangers, also translated as Only Love Strangers, (Chinese: 只愛陌生人; pinyin: zhǐ ài mòshēngrén) is the seventh Mandarin-language studio album (sixteenth overall) by Chinese singer Faye Wong. It was released on September 10, 1999, by EMI. The album contains a total of 12 songs (10 tracks in Mandarin with 2 bonus Cantonese adaptations of two of the songs) and was produced by Alvin Leong.

The album sold more than 800,000 copies and reached number one in the album charts of Hong Kong, China, Taiwan, Singapore, and Malaysia. After the release of Lovers & Strangers, Guinness World Records declared Faye Wong the best-selling female Cantopop artist of all time.

== Background and development ==
Like Wong's previous album, Sing and Play, Lovers & Strangers was produced by Alvin Leong. Other core members of the production group included C.Y. Kong, Adrian Chan, Albert Leung, and Zhang Yadong.

Lovers & Strangers included 12 tracks in total, with nine written by Albert Leung. The only track written by Wong was "Spectacular," on which she collaborated with Zhang Yadong to compose. Additionally, Zhang composed and arranged both "Only Love Strangers" and "After the Beep," where the former, eponymous with the album, is covered from the original version in Zhang's 1998 album Ya Tung. In Wong's version of this song, her daughter Leah Dou made a cameo appearance, singing the line "Come on baby." Two Mandarin songs in the album, "Hundred Years of Solitude" and "Butterfly," have the same melody but different lyrics as their respective Cantonese versions, "Keeping Guard over the Field" and "Postman." Albert Leung first composed the Mandarin versions, then based the Cantonese lyrics on them. "Hundred Years of Solitude" and its Cantonese version, "Keeping Guard Over the Field," were composed by C.Y. Kong and Adrian Chan; "Butterfly" and its Cantonese Version, "Postman," however, were composed and arranged solely by Adrian Chan. Furthermore, C.Y. Kong tailor-made the music of Wong's rock song "The Last Blossom," whose title originated from Leung's quoting of a novel by Yi Shu. This song also marked Wong's first use of the distortion technique.

This album is the first collaboration between Wong and the composer Dian Chen—the two composed "Overthrown" together, with Chiu Li-Kwan writing the lyrics. This is also the second collaboration between Chiu and Wong after the song "Wake Up" on the album Sing and Play. Yuan Wei-jen, after "No Regrets/Stubborn and Regretless," which was released seven years ago, composed another piece for Wong—"An Ephemeral Cloud." Moreover, two composers from Mainland China, Li Bing and Guo Liang, composed "The Moon at That Moment" and "Hypnosis," respectively.

== Writing and production ==
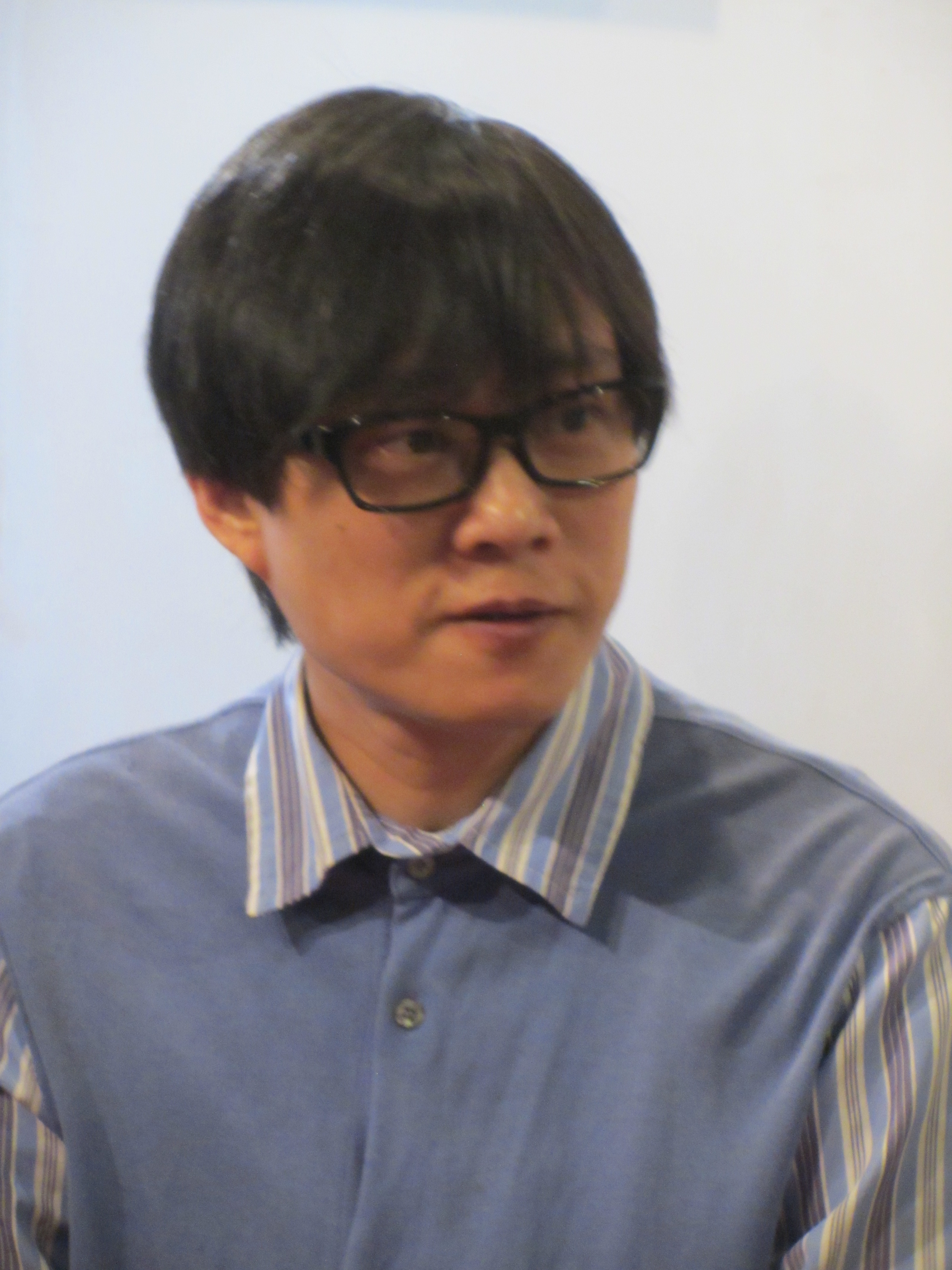
Albert Leung, one of Wong's lyricists for Lovers & Strangers

The overall style of this album continues Wong's steady performance during recent years, but the opening song, "The Last Blossom," was one of Wong's significant breakthroughs. Her distortion technique in this track portrays a fear of love and a depressed state of mind. Wong's handling of the middle notes transformed her usual impeccable timbre.

Beginning from the captivating title, Lovers & Strangers, Albert Leung provided a plethora of profound lyrics. For instance, "Only Love Strangers" (although the more grammatically correct placement of "Only" should be after "Love") used surprisingly imaginative and wide-spanning combinations of characters to convey a postmodern aura mixed with a touch of romance. Wong also played a large role in boosting the appeal of "Only Love Strangers" by reimagining Zhang Yadong's version—besides maintaining the original tonality, both the structure and the timbre hearken strongly to the 1998 song. The piece uses bossa nova as its skeleton, while the electronic rhythm coupled with the trumpet sounds characteristic of jazz, demonstrates both Zhang's technical dexterity in musical arrangement and his talent for improvisation. In terms of vocals, although Wong paralleled Zhang's seemingly-casual attitude, she added the mindset of handling complicated matters easily, naturally, and unrestrainedly. She made the "stranger" perspective stick out by acting indifferently and independently.

The album's lead single, "The Moon at That Moment," is a guitar-driven pop ballad. Albert Leung's skillful writing style in the track is narrated by Wong in a slightly restrained and controlled manner. Guo Liang's "Hypnosis" is a trip hop and folk rock number with a hearty beat that doesn't lose its melodic beauty. In 1998, Leung was caught up in the emotions of lost love, so he thought of many ways to understand and let go of his grief. At this time, Wong, for whom he was to provide lyrics, was also going through marital problems. Later, Leung wrote some lyrics for Wong, encouraging her and himself that they should take what they can get and let go, and one of the lyrics was "A Hundred Years of Loneliness." The title of the song comes from the novel One Hundred Years of Solitude by García Márquez. Leung wrote the lyrics of the song using a Buddhist metaphor: "Sorrows are real, tears are fake, there is no cause and effect in the first place. A hundred years from now, there will be no you and no me". From this song "One Hundred Years of Loneliness" to its Cantonese counterpart "Watching the Wheat Fields", Leung used his lyrics to document what had once been engraved in his heart.

C. Y. Kong, a veteran in Wong's production team, incorporated modern rock and Middle-Eastern influences into the composition of "Hundred Years of Solitude." The album's opening track, "The Last Blossom," is a psychedelic rock number also written by C. Y. Kong. Adrian Chan's "Butterfly" is a leisurely ballad that at times prompts listeners to overlook the buried rhythm and blues elements. Yuan Wei-jen held the reins once more in the production of "An Ephemeral Cloud," an elegant Neoclassicist ballad. Zhang Yadong's "After the Beep" is a ballad inspired by British trip hop and dub music, and is also strongly influenced by ambient music. "Overthrown is a mellow ballad inspired by folk music. "Spectacular," a track listed near the end of the album, is a thumping dance rock number.

== Title and artwork ==
The album title comes from a line of the refrain in track 4, "Only Love Strangers" (... 我只爱陌生人, I only love strangers...). A reporter had asked Wong if the album had anything to do with her "old love that was too nerve-wracking." Wong laughed and replied with: "It's not a couplet, is there a crossword? Zhang Yadong sang 'Only Love Strangers' before. I like it very much, so I sang it again. In fact, this song is not a love song. We often walk on the road, may suddenly like the hair style of a passer-by on the opposite side of the road, appearance, or even a kind of expression. Its just a momentary sensation, but it has nothing to do with love." The cover of the album is based on a pink background, with Wong wearing a rock-styled, tight-fitting black leather jacket, acting some semblance of welcoming her lover but in reality having the intention to reject.

== Promotion ==
=== Singles and music videos ===
The music video for "The Last Blossom" opens up with a man rolling a giant ball down a white room. The video depicts Wong in a black dress, a gold dress and a pink dress walking around a series of white painted rooms doing a series of things: eating strawberries, rolling a giant ball down a hallway, dancing on a bed, holding a disco ball, sitting and looking through a telescope and shooting arrows at shadows in the room. There are also interspersed scenes of a group of men holding umbrellas in a white painted room with a hay covered floor. The video ends with snow falling down.

The video for "The Moon at That Time" depicts five Faye Wongs at the same time near a red couch, each with a different personality: the first one is blow-drying her hair, the second one is listening to music on her headphones, the third one is constantly talking on the phone, the fourth one is sleeping and the fifth one is smoking cigarettes to drown her sorrows and rubbing them on her ashtray. They were all under the moon at that time, and had a lot of worries about their relationships. As for the clothes and hairstyles, they were all tailored to fit the different characters.

The music video for "Only Love Strangers" was filmed entirely in black and white and depicts Wong walking on a roadside, riding on a bus, eating at a restaurant and strolling down the streets of a city.

The video for "Hundred Years of Solitude" opens with Wong in a red wig running down an alleyway holding a bag in her hands, while a spotlight is pointed at her. She enters a public bathroom. After applying her makeup in front of the bathroom mirrors, she hides inside a stall, then comes back out to take off her wig, grab her bag and leave. There are interspersed scenes of camera rotating in a circle in front of Wong in the bathroom and Wong running from a police car down the road. The final shot of the video is Wong lying unconscious on the bathroom floor.

The video for "Butterfly" mostly chronicles Wong's comraderies along with behind the scenes footage of the album.

The video for "An Ephemeral Cloud" depicts Wong wearing a long grey dress in a smoke covered room. Throughout many times in the video, Wong holds up a lighter gun or a lightbulb on a string in front of the camera. Wong completely disappears in the final shot of the video with only her dress remaining.

The video for "Overthrown" depicts Wong singing in a red room with yellow flowers.

== Accolades ==
In 1999, Wong won a China Times Award for Top 10 Albums of the Year, a Metro Radio Hits Music Awards for Hit Album, a Singaporean Golden Melody Award for Best Album, and a Chinese Musicians Exchange Award for Top 10 Albums of the Year for the album Lovers & Strangers. Similarly, the song "Hundred Years of Solitude" also won a Chinese Musicians Exchange Award, but for the Top 10 Songs of the Year. In 2000, Wong was nominated for the 11th Golden Melody Awards for Best Female Mandarin Singer. In 1999, the song "Postman" won the Ultimate Song Chart Awards Presentation for the Ultimate Top 10 Recommended Songs of the Year, as well as the 32nd Top Ten Chinese Gold Songs Award for Best Mandarin Pop Song of the Year. In 1999, the song "The Moon at That Moment" made it onto the leaderboard of the 6th Chinese Music Awards' Top 20 Songs. The same song also won the 1st Malaysian Asia Mandarin Golden Melody Award for Top 15 songs.

== Usage in media ==
Track 10, the rock song "Spectacular", featured in a Pepsi commercial. A VCD showing the filming of the commercial was released with some versions of the album. The title track, "Only Love Strangers", was featured in the Sylvester Stallone film Get Carter. Track 5 was used by Taiwan's STAR Chinese Channel as the ending theme song of the Chinese television series The Taiping Heavenly Kingdom. The original ending theme song was sung by Mao Amin.

== Track listing ==
All lyrics are written by Albert Leung with the exception of Yuan Wei-jen's contribution on track 7, Chiu Li-Kwan's contribution on track 9 and Wong's contribution on track 10.

Lovers & Strangers – Standard edition
No.	Title	Music	Arranger(s)	Length
1.	"開到荼蘼" (The Last Blossom)	C.Y. Kong	C.Y. Kong	5:13
2.	"當時的月亮" (The Moon at That Moment)	Li Bing	Adrian Chan	3:52
3.	"催眠" (Hypnosis)	Guo Liang	Guo Liang	4:27
4.	"只愛陌生人" (Only Love Strangers)	Zhang Yadong	Zhang Yadong	3:42
5.	"百年孤寂" (Hundred Years of Solitude)	C.Y. Kong; Adrian Chan	C.Y. Kong	5:17
6.	"蝴蝶" (Butterfly)	Adrian Chan	Adrian Chan	3:58
7.	"過眼雲煙" (An Ephemeral Cloud)	Yuan Wei-jen	Yuan Wei-jen	4:05
8.	"嗶一聲之後" (After the Beep)	Zhang Yadong	Zhang Yadong	4:13
9.	"推翻" (Overthrown)	Dian Chen	Ray Huang	4:23
10.	"精彩" (Spectacular)	Zhang Yadong; Faye Wong	Zhang Yadong	4:45
11.	"守望麥田" (Keeping Guard over the Field)	C.Y. Kong; Adrian Chan	C.Y. Kong	5:17
12.	"郵差" (Postman)	Adrian Chan	Adrian Chan	4:19
Total length:				53:31

Tracks 11 and 12 are Cantonese versions of tracks 5 and 6 respectively. Only track 12 has a different musical arrangement.

Japanese edition bonus track
No.	Title	Length
13.	"開到荼蘼" (Remix)	3:46
Total length:		3:46

== Charts ==
=== Weekly charts ===
Chart (1999)	Peak position
Hong Kong Albums (IFPI)	1
Japanese Albums (Oricon)	44
Malaysian Albums (RIM)	1
Singaporean Albums (IFPI)	1
Taiwanese Albums (IFPI Taiwan)	1
