= Fuzao =

Fuzao (浮躁)

Studio album by Faye Wong
- Released: June 3, 1996
- Genre: C-pop; dream pop
- Length: 35:10
- Label: Cinepoly
- Producer: Zhang Yadong

Faye Wong chronology
Di-Dar (1995)	Fuzao (浮躁) (1996)	Toy (1997)

Fuzao (Chinese: 浮躁; pinyin: Fúzào; lit. "Impetuous") is the fourth Mandarin-language studio album (thirteenth overall) by Chinese singer Faye Wong. It was released on June 3, 1996, through Cinepoly. Wong took more artistic risks with her work as she approached the end of her record contract, resulting in the experimental nature of Fuzao. The album was positively received by critics, with The Straits Times considering the album as Wong's boldest and most artistically coherent effort to date.

An alternative record, Fuzao was largely written and composed by Wong, with arrangement and production done by her husband, Dou Wei, and Zhang Yadong. The album features two collaborations with the Scottish dream pop band Cocteau Twins, whose sound and aesthetic was a heavy influence.

== Background and release ==
Translated names used in English-language sources are Restless, Exasperation, Anxiety and Impatience. The term was widely used in relation to the cultural anxiety of the period.

The Hong Kong edition, including the back panel, shows three photos of Faye Wong in the pose of the three wise monkeys. In 2008, Universal Music re-released the album in a paper Eco pack as part of its Asian series of 20th Century Masters.

== Composition ==
As she was approaching the end of her recording contract with Cinepoly, Wong took more artistic risks with this highly experimental album. Some tracks are wordless or use self-created sounds, including the cheerful-sounding refrain "la cha bor" of the title track. It contains mainly her own compositions, with an aesthetic inspired by the Cocteau Twins, who contributed two original songs to the album, "Fracture" (分裂) and "Spoilsport" (掃興). Wong had previously covered their work on Random Thoughts in 1994, and established a remote working relationship with them – even laying down vocals for a special duet version of "Serpentskirt" on the Asian release of the group's 1996 album Milk And Kisses, as her voice blended well with Elizabeth Fraser's ethereal soprano. A Buddhist, Wong weaves teachings of transience and disengagement into the album. These themes can also be found in some of her other albums.

== Reception ==
Professional ratings
Review scores
Source	Rating
Pitchfork	8.3/10

Paying less attention to the demands of the mainstream market, the album's sales were lower than for Wong's preceding albums. However, Restless was received favorably by critics. The Straits Times considered the album as her boldest and most artistically coherent effort to date. Southern Metropolis Daily described the album as "very harmonious and unified", and stated that the second song, Restless, was similar to Di-Dar albeit simpler.

After the release, Wong became the second Chinese artist (after Gong Li) and the first Chinese singer to be featured on the cover of Time magazine, under the headline "The Divas of Pop". The title track is featured in the 1998 film Restless. In a 2023 review of four reissued Wong albums (Please Myself to Fuzao) by Pitchfork, Michael Hong wrote that "the album's producers steep the music in the sounds of Beijing's nascent rock scene" and felt that Faye's "reserved yet playfully mischievous nature permeates the album".

== Track listing ==
All written by Faye Wong, unless otherwise.

1. "Wúcháng" (无常), "Sporadic" or "Unusual" – 2:35
2. "Fúzào" (浮躁), "Restless" or "Anxiety" – 2:58
3. "Xiǎngxiàng" (想像), "Visualize" or "Imagine" – 3:36
4. "Fēnliè" (分裂), "Fracture" or "Divide", composed by Cocteau Twins, lyrics by Lin Xi – 4:00
5. "Bùān" (不安), "Uneasy" or "Unstable", instrumental – 2:10
6. "Nǎr" (哪兒), "Where" – 3:50
7. "Duòluò" (堕落), "Decadence" or "Degenerate" – 3:40
8. "Sǎoxìng" (扫兴), "Spoilsport" or "Disappointment", composed by Cocteau Twins, lyrics by Wyman Wong – 4:08
9. "Mòrì" (末日), "Doomsday" or "Judgment Day" – 4:00
10. "Yesanpo" (野三坡 Yěsānpō), literally "Wild Three Hills" – 3:52
  Based on Yesanpo National Park

== Charts ==
Chart (1996)	Peak position
Hong Kong Albums (IFPI)	2
Japanese Albums (Oricon)	50
Taiwanese Albums (IFPI Taiwan)	4

== Release history ==
Region	Release date	Label	Format(s)
Hong Kong	June 3, 1996	Cinepoly Records	CD; cassette
Taiwan	June 19, 1996	Linfair Records	CD; cassette
China	1996	Jindian Audio and Video	CD; cassette
Japan	July 25, 1996	Polydor	CD
Japan	September 26, 1997	Polydor	CD (reissue)
Hong Kong	April 11, 2008	Universal Music Hong Kong	CD (ECO-Pack environmental protection series)
Hong Kong	December 29, 2011	Universal Music Hong Kong	CD (Golden Disc Anniversary Series)
Hong Kong	December 13, 2013	Universal Music Hong Kong	K2HD
Hong Kong	October 19, 2016	Universal Music Hong Kong	CD (Famous Worldwide Series)
Hong Kong	December 14, 2020	Universal Music Hong Kong	CD (24K Gold Series)
Hong Kong	August 25, 2021	Universal Music Hong Kong	Vinyl (ARS series)
Japan	September 27, 2023	Universal Music Japan	Vinyl
