= Faye Wong =

Chinese singer-songwriter and actress (born 1969)

- 王菲
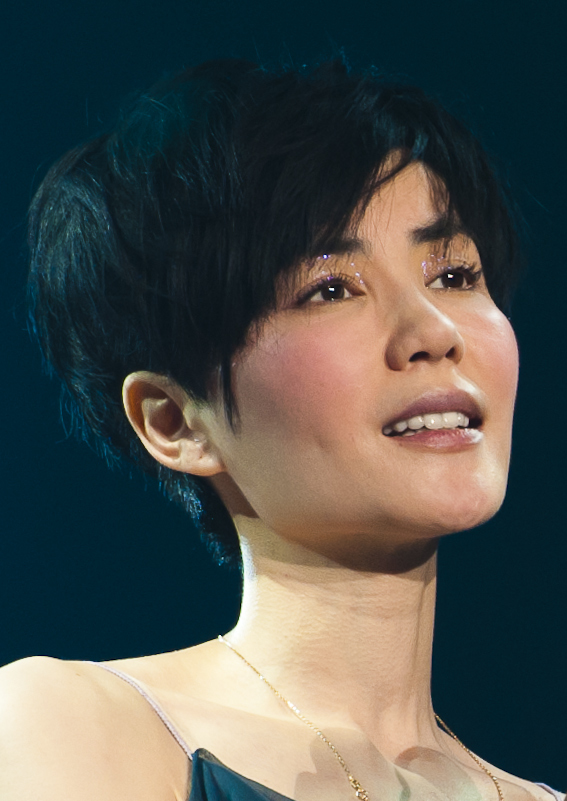
- Wong in 2011
- Born: 8 August 1969 (age 57); Dongcheng, Beijing, China
- Other name: Xia Lin (Note: It has been reported that before the age of 15 she was called Xia Lin, adopting her mother's surname since her paternal family was persecuted in the Cultural Revolution, but this claim has not been confirmed by her or her family. Some of Wong's former neighbours also could not remember this name.)
- Citizenship: Chinese (Hong Kong)
- Occupations: Singer-songwriter; record producer; actress
- Years active: 1989–present
- Works: Discography
- Spouses: Dou Wei (m. 1996; div. 1999) Li Yapeng (m. 2005; div. 2013)
- Partner: Nicholas Tse (2000–2003, 2014–present)
- Children: Leah Dou; Li Yan
- Musical career
- Also known as: Shirley Wong (王靖雯)
- Origin: Hong Kong
- Genres: Pop; dream pop; alternative pop; rock
- Labels: Cinepoly; EMI; Sony Music

Chinese name
- Chinese: 王菲
Transcriptions
Standard Mandarin
- Hanyu Pinyin: Wáng Fēi
Yue: Cantonese
- Jyutping: Wong^{4} Fei^{1}
- Hong Kong Romanisation: Wong Fei

Stage name
- Chinese: 王靖雯
Transcriptions
Standard Mandarin
- Hanyu Pinyin: Wáng Jìngwén
Yue: Cantonese
- Jyutping: Wong^{4} Zing^{6}man^{4}
- Hong Kong Romanisation: Wong Tsin-man

Birth name
- Chinese: 夏林
Transcriptions
Standard Mandarin
- Hanyu Pinyin: Xià Lín
Yue: Cantonese
- Jyutping: Haa^{6} Lam^{4}
- Hong Kong Romanisation: Ha Lam

Faye Wong (Chinese: 王菲; pinyin: Wáng Fēi; born 8 August 1969) is a Hong Kong singer-songwriter and actress. Early in her career, she briefly used the stage name Shirley Wong (王靖雯). Born in Beijing, she moved to Hong Kong at the age of 18. Her debut album Shirley Wong (1989) was in Cantonese and her breakthrough came with the Cantopop song "Fragile Woman" in 1992. She established her style by blending alternative music with Chinese pop, and since the late 1990s has recorded primarily in her native Mandarin. In 2000, Wong was recognised by Guinness World Records as the best selling Cantopop female artist, having sold an estimated 9.7 million copies of her albums by March 2000, counting Hong Kong, Taiwan and Japan. Upon her second marriage in 2005, she withdrew from the limelight and moved back to Beijing, making only occasional stage appearances. In 2009, Wong was voted the second most influential Chinese celebrity of the past 60 years in a poll conducted by the State Council Information Office to commemorate the 60th anniversary of the People's Republic of China.

One of the biggest names in the Chinese-speaking world, Wong has also gained followings in Japan and Southeast Asia. In the West, she is perhaps best known for starring in Wong Kar-wai's films Chungking Express (1994) and 2046 (2004). Often titled "diva" or "heavenly queen" in Chinese, Wong has gained a reputation for her "cool" personality. In Encyclopedia of Contemporary Chinese Culture, Jeroen de Kloet characterised her as "singer, actress, mother, celebrity, royalty, sex symbol and diva all at the same time."

== Early life ==
Wong was born at Peking Union Medical College Hospital in Dongcheng District, Beijing in the midst of the Cultural Revolution. Her father was Wang Youlin (王佑林), a mining engineer and second son of Wang Zhaomin (1901–1985), member of the Legislative Yuan of the Republic of China. Wang Youlin had been parentally betrothed to Li Min (李珉), sister of Taiwanese writer Li Ao, but when Wang Zhaomin left for Taiwan upon the Communist takeover, Wang Youlin, then a left-leaning college student, stayed in mainland China and later wed Xia Guiying (夏桂影), a revolutionary music soprano with China Coal Mine Art Troupe, who would be Wong's mother. Wong had a brother named Wang Yi (王弋), who was two years older than her and died in his fifties due to illness.

Wong grew up in the Qingniangou area near Andingmen, where the residential communities affiliated with the coal mining industry were situated. She attended Ditan Primary School, where she served as the class's arts and cultural coordinator. She then attended Beijing Dongzhimen Middle School.

In 1987, Wong was admitted to study biology at Xiamen University through the national college entrance exam, but she chose to move to Hong Kong to join her father, who had been working there for a few years. The plan was for her to stay there for a year to fulfill the permanent residency requirement, and go to study in Australia. However, since Wong did not know a word of Cantonese, the primary language spoken in Hong Kong, she experienced great loneliness. Following a brief modeling stint, she began taking singing lessons as a distraction with Tai See-chung, an East Indies-born Chinese who had gone to school in mainland China before tutoring Hong Kong superstars Anita Mui, Andy Lau, Leon Lai, Aaron Kwok, as well as Wong.

== Music career ==
=== 1985–1988: Beginnings ===
As a student, Wong already was involved in singing and attracted interest from several publishers. On occasions, the school had to hide her artistic activities from her strict mother, who as a professional saw singing as a dead-end career. Despite her mother's opposition, Wong released 6 low-cost cover albums from 1985 to 1987 while still in high school, all in the form of cassettes, mostly consisting of songs by her personal idol, iconic Taiwanese singer Teresa Teng. For the last of these early recordings, the producer Wei Yuanqiang chose the title Wong Fei Treasury (王菲珍藏集), intending to show that he recognised a distinctive talent in the teenager.

After moving to Hong Kong, the 19-year-old Wong signed with Cinepoly Records in 1988 on the recommendation of her singing tutor, Tai See-chung, after placing third in an Asia-Pacific Broadcasting Union singing contest. It was not only an unplanned move on the part of Wong, since her mother disapproved of a singing career, but also a risky move on the part of Alex Chan Siu-po, Cinepoly's general manager, since Mainlanders were stereotyped as "backwards" in Hong Kong.

=== 1989–1991: the Shirley Wong period ===
At the request of Cinepoly, Wong picked one of the "sophisticated" stage names, Wong Jing Man, with an English name "Shirley," offered by the company through a fortune-teller, to replace her "Mainland-sounding" name. In 1989, her debut album Shirley Wong sold 25,000 copies and won her bronze at the "Chik Chak New Artist Award." Two more albums (Everything and You're the Only One) followed, similarly featuring many cover songs by artists from the US and Japan. They sold 10,000 copies each, despite relentless promotions by the company. Many in Hong Kong perceived her to be "backwards," lacking personality.

At the time, both Wong and her then-agent Leslie Chan (陳健添) were in conflicts with Cinepoly under Chan Siu-Bo's successor Lal Dayaram (林振業). Leslie Chan then sold Wong's contract for 2 million HKD to Taiwanese singer Lo Ta-yu. Under the arrangement of Lo, who founded Music Factory in 1990 (later becoming the Hong Kong subsidiary of Rock Records), Wong went to the United States for professional training at the end of 1991. She initially went to Los Angeles with plans to learn keyboards, but missed the class registration deadline. She then moved to New York, living with Wawa, another new artist signed by Lo, at the house of Lo's sister, Jennifer, in Flushing. Wong attended classes at the Barbizon School, the Martha Graham School and with personal singing tutors for about two months. In 1996, she explained New York's influence on her:

I wandered around, visited museums and sat at cafes. There were so many strange, confident-looking people. They didn't care what other people thought of them. I felt I was originally like that too, independent and a little rebellious. But in Hong Kong I lost myself. I was shaped by others and became like a machine, a dress hanger. I had no personality and no sense of direction.

Even though Wong found the experience enlightening, her less than tactful communication led Lo to decide to end the contract with her by the time she returned to Hong Kong. The two never collaborated or shared the stage thereafter. With the help of her teacher Tai See-Chung, Wong found a new agent in Katie Chan (陳家瑛), who has remained her agent as well as her daughter's ever since.

=== 1992–1995: Coming Home, No Regrets, 100,000 Whys, Random Thoughts, Mystery, Sky, Decadent Sounds of Faye and Di-Dar ===
The 1992 album Coming Home, the first release since her return from New York, prominently featured on the cover her new English name "Faye," a homophone to her given Chinese name, and the Chinese character "Jing," a reference to her hometown Beijing. From then on she changed her stage name back to "Wang Fei" (王菲). Coming Home incorporated R&B influences and was a change in musical direction from the more traditional Cantopop fare of her earlier albums. Coming Home also included her first English-language number, "Kisses in the Wind." Wong stated in a 1994 concert that she very much liked this song, after which various websites listed it as her personal favourite; however, in a 1998 CNN interview she declined to name one favourite song, saying that there were too many, and in 2003 she stated that she no longer liked her old songs.

One of the songs on Coming Home, "Fragile Woman" (容易受傷的女人), a cover of a Japanese song "Rouge" originally composed by Miyuki Nakajima and sung by Naomi Chiaki, became Wong's first hit after being featured in the popular TVB drama The Greed of Man (1992). (Thanks to Wong's cover, this 1972 song—in different language versions—would in the early 1990s become a huge regional hit in Thailand, Vietnam, the rest of Southeast Asia and even Turkey; the most popular English version was titled "Broken-Hearted Woman"). The favourable reception of "Fragile Woman" led Wong to abandon her original plans to return to Los Angeles to continue her studies. Instead, she stayed in Hong Kong to build on her newfound success.

In February 1993, she wrote the Mandarin lyrics for her ballad "No Regrets" (執迷不悔) which led many to praise her as a gifted lyricist. In February, it became the title track to her album No Regrets. No Regrets features soft contemporary numbers, a few dance tracks and two versions of the title ballad: Wong's Mandarin version, and a Cantonese version (lyrics by Keith Chan). In September 1993, her next album 100,000 Whys showed considerable alternative music influences from the West, including the popular song "Cold War" (冷戰), a cover of "Silent All These Years" by Tori Amos. In 1992–93 she also appeared in TVB shows such as File of Justice II and Legendary Ranger.

Wong has named the Scottish post-punk group Cocteau Twins among her favourite bands, and their influence was clear on her next Cantonese album, Random Thoughts. Her Cantonese version of The Cranberries' "Dreams" was featured in Wong Kar-wai's film Chungking Express, and gained lasting popularity. Besides covering songs and learning distinctive vocal techniques, Wong recorded her own compositions: "Pledge" (誓言), co-written with her then-boyfriend (and later husband), Beijing rock star Dou Wei, as well as her first and only spoken-word song "Exit" (出路). The latter is a rare window into her outlook on life, including her worries about her future marriage with Dou, her conversion to Buddhism, her self-criticism, and her cynicism about the show business.

Besides two Cantonese albums in 1994, Wong released two other albums in Mandarin in Taiwan, Mystery and Sky, which propelled her to fame in the Mandarin-speaking world. The song "I'm Willing" (我願意) in Mystery would become her trademark Mandopop song till this day, and has been covered by other singers such as Gigi Leung, Sammi Cheng and Jay Chou. Sky was seen by fans as a successful amalgam of artistic experimentation and commercialism. While her hits in Hong Kong were noticeably alternative, her two Mandarin albums were more lyrical and traditional. Critics generally credit Taiwanese producer Yang Ming-huang (楊明煌) for their success.

With four best-selling albums in Cantonese and Mandarin and a record-breaking 18 consecutive concerts in Hong Kong, Wong had established herself as a diva, or "heavenly queen" (天后) as she is commonly known in the Chinese world, by the mid-1990s. Meanwhile, her distaste for Hong Kong's entertainment industry and media environment only grew. She was frequently in touch with the Beijing rock scene, where Dou Wei was a leading light and whose influence distinguished her from the mainstream pop music in Hong Kong.

In 1995, she released Decadent Sounds of Faye, a cover album of songs originally recorded by her idol Teresa Teng (whose songs had been banned during Wong's formative years in mainland China for being "decadent sounds" from Taiwan). A duet with Teng was planned for the album, but she died before this could be recorded. Decadent Sounds sold well despite initial negative criticism, and has come to be recognised as an example of imaginative covering by recent critics.

Wong and Dou Wei were the winner and the runner-up to the 1995 MTV International Viewer's Choice Award, with the music videos "Chess" and "Black Dream" respectively. In December, she released her Cantonese album Di-Dar which mixes an alternative yodelling style with a touch of Indian and Middle Eastern flavour. This album was a success, partly because it was so different from the mainstream Cantopop music, but—ironically—a couple of very traditional romantic songs topped the charts.

=== 1996: Fuzao and Cinepoly extended plays ===
1996 saw the release of what many would consider her boldest and most artistically coherent effort to date, Fuzao, usually translated as Restless or Impatience. This was her last album with Cinepoly, and Wong felt she could take more artistic risks. The album contains mainly her own compositions, with an aesthetic inspired by the Cocteau Twins, who penned two original songs for the album, "Fracture" (分裂) and "Spoilsport" (掃興). As Wong had covered their work in 1994, she had established a remote working relationship with them—even laying down vocals for a special duet version of "Serpentskirt" on the Asian release of the group's 1996 album Milk & Kisses.

Although the album was Wong's personal favourite, the response from Hong Kong and Taiwan was less supportive. Many fans who enjoyed her previous three Mandarin albums turned their back on Restless, which they considered to be too alternative and self-absorbed. There were few ballads which were radio-friendly and some became disenchanted with her experimental style of recording. However, hardcore fans, known as Fayenatics, adored the album and it became a cult hit. Wong has not released another fully artistic album since. After the release, Wong became the second Chinese artist (after Gong Li)—and the first Chinese singer—to be featured on the cover of Time magazine.

From 1993 to 1995, Cinepoly released an EP of Wong's songs each year: Like Wind (如風), Faye Disc (菲碟) and One Person, Two Roles. Then in 1996–97, she recorded ten original songs in Cantonese, all written by lyricist Albert Leung, collaborating with various composers such as Wong Ka Keung, Adrian Chan and Chan Xiao Xia. After her contract with Cinepoly expired, the company released eight of these songs in the two subsequent EPs, Toy (玩具) and Help Yourself (自便). Although the EPs contained new songs—ballad hits like "Undercurrent" (暗湧), "Date" (約定) and "On Time" (守時)—and were welcomed by fans, they received lukewarm critical responses. The other two songs were included in later compilations; the last to be released was "Scary" (心驚膽顫) in 2002.

As of October 1996, Wong had sold over 7 million records.

=== 1997–1998: Faye Wong and Sing and Play ===
Wong signed for EMI in 1997 after her first daughter was born, in a contract worth HK$60 million (approx. US$7.7 million), to release 55 songs in five albums. While most of her earlier albums were in Cantonese, Wong has since sung more in Mandarin, her mother tongue. Having gone through a period of experimentation, Wong stated that she wished to make "music that I like. I do not care if others don't, though I would be delighted if they do".

Her first album with EMI was Faye Wong (王菲 1997), released in autumn 1997. Critics expecting another artistic breakthrough after 1996's Restlessness found—much to their dismay—a much more inoffensive and commercially oriented musical album. Simon Raymonde and Robin Guthrie of the Cocteau Twins wrote two original compositions for the album, but only one, "The Amusement Park" (娛樂場), was used. This release included an acoustic cover of the Cocteau Twins' "Rilkean Heart", renamed "Nostalgia" (懷念).

This album is filled with feelings of lethargy, languor and disengagement, yet most of the tracks sound warm and sweet, as opposed to those piquant self-centered ones before her motherhood. Reporters noticed that she began to smile more often in public and was not as icy or aloof as before. However, the album was released during the Asian financial crisis which swept East and Southeast Asia. Wong's former company Cinepoly, which retains the copyright on her previous records, released a Mandarin compilation at the same time in 1997 to counteract her new EMI album (and indeed outperformed it). Later, Cinepoly would release two compilations each year to compete with Wong's new releases, a tactic which has come under fire from her international fans. Faye Wong did not sell well in Hong Kong, but did quite well in Taiwan and mainland China. Although Wong had garnered some popularity with her 4 previous Mandarin albums, it was really this sweet yet slightly alternative album which had the mainland Chinese audience listening. Her profile began to rise sharply in Asia.

In 1997, singer Na Ying signed with EMI and struck a lasting friendship with Wong. Na had been a regular at the annual CCTV New Year's Gala, the most-watched TV show in mainland China and the world, and she invited Wong to do a duet with her on the upcoming show in 1998. The collaboration by the "Mainland Diva" and "Hong Kong Diva", titled "Let's Meet in 1998" (相約一九九八), became an instant hit and arguably the most played song in mainland China that year. Thanks to this exposure (Note: In 2009, former CCTV president Yang Weiguang revealed that Faye Wong had been "banned" by the station for some time, after refusing to change the lyrics of a song when the station invited her once before (which she did not participate as a result).), in late 1998 Wong finally held her first concert in her native mainland, and continued her tour in 9 cities.

Sing and Play was released in October, and contained four songs composed by Wong: the opening track "Emotional Life", "Face", "A Little Clever" and "Tong" (both written for her daughter, the latter produced by Dou Wei). Amongst other songs were "Give Up Halfway" (sung both in Mandarin and Cantonese), which was one of the more commercially successful tracks from the album, along with the successful ballad "Red Bean" (紅豆). It was the best selling Chinese album in Singapore in 1999. Together with Lovers & Strangers and the compilation album Wishing We Last Forever, it gave Wong 3 albums in the Singapore top 10 selling Chinese albums of 1999, making her one of the best selling artists in Singapore in 1999. In Japan, the album sold close to 90,000 copies in the first three months after its release.

=== 1999: "Eyes on Me" and Lovers & Strangers ===
The video game Final Fantasy VIII was released in Japan in February 1999, for which Wong recorded the ballad "Eyes on Me" in English. It was the first time that a Japanese video game featured a Chinese singer for its theme. The "Eyes on Me" single sold over 335,620 copies in Japan and 500,000 worldwide, making it the best-selling video game music disc to that date, and winning "Song of the Year (Western Music)" at the 14th Annual Japan Gold Disc Awards. When the game was released in North America later that year, the theme song became very popular among gamers in the West; while it was not a mainstream hit there (as Wong had no desire to explore these markets), she gained many fans who were not previously familiar with her music.

In March, she held two concerts in Nippon Budokan, with tickets for the first show on 11 March being sold out in one day and an extra show added on 12 March; she was the first Chinese singer to perform in that venue. Earlier in the year, Pepsi-Cola had made Wong a spokesperson, and after these concerts she shot the promotional music video for "Spectacular" (精彩), which Pepsi used in commercials.

The album Lovers & Strangers was released in late September, and sold over 800,000 copies, topping the charts in Hong Kong, mainland China, Taiwan, Singapore and Malaysia. This was her first album after parting from Dou Wei, and her first without any musical collaborations with him since their relationship began. The title track of the album was featured in Sylvester Stallone's remake of Get Carter. The entire album was penned by Albert Leung, who, like Wong, was suffering from a broken heart in his love life at the time. Buddhist philosophy has informed his lyrics since the album, originally as a way to console both Wong and himself. In 2022, Leung picked two of the songs, "Last Blossom" (開到荼靡) and "One Hundred Years of Solitude" (百年孤寂), as his all-time favorites over his prolific career. Wong also became a spokesperson for JPhone in October, 1999, performing in several commercials which aired in Japan.

=== 2000–2004: Fable, Faye Wong and To Love ===
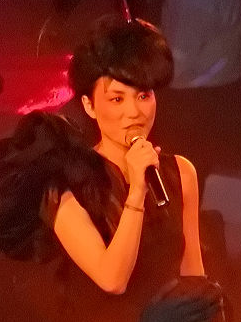
Wong in concert, Hong Kong, 2003

The new millennium saw a shift in Wong's musical career with the album Fable. The prominent feature of this album is its segregated and distinguishable halves—songs in the first half of the album running in an almost continuous manner and in a format that is akin to a song-cycle, and the second half of discrete, chart-friendly numbers. The album itself derives its artistic merits from the first half, notable for its unique thematic and continuous sequencing of songs unprecedented in the Chinese music industry. The theme itself is ambiguous and the lyrics subject to multiple interpretations, though it is quite certain that the theme of Fable forms the main thematic reference, derived from the motivic elements of the prince and princess in fables and fairytales of European origins. Elements of spirituality, metaphysics and Buddhism hold an important place in the lyrics as well, penned by Albert Leung who has by then, been unanimously identified as Wong's lyricist par excellence. Musically the arrangements display influences of drum and bass, electronica, east–west collage and lush string orchestral infusions. Her other activities during this year included the Pepsi promotional duet and music video of "Galaxy Unlimited" with Aaron Kwok as well as several concerts in China and Taiwan.

By this time, Wong had forged a famous alliance with producer Zhang Yadong and lyricist Albert Leung. However, due to Zhang Yadong's unavailability during this period (he was engaged on other projects), Wong decided to treat this last album with EMI as an experiment whereby she would collaborate with different people and "see what their vision of her will be".

The response from the public and critics alike were lukewarm at best. Wong herself admitted that she was not totally satisfied with some tracks, namely those produced by Taiwan's “father of rock” Wu Bai, which had an industrial electronica flavour reminiscent of Karen Mok's album Golden Flower. Wong selected two folk-influenced compositions by then-emerging Singaporean singer-songwriter Tanya Chua. Controversy arose when Wong recorded one of the compositions in both Mandarin and Cantonese, only for it to emerge that Chua had already released an English version, "It's Your Chance", making Wong's recordings effectively cover versions. The song that generated most noise from the press was "Vertigo" (迷魂記), a ballad composed by her then-boyfriend Nicholas Tse. Tse claimed that his composition was originally for Singaporean singer Stefanie Sun; however, when the song went to Wong, Albert Leung crafted it as a love song between Wong and Tse from Wong's perspective. Leung followed this with a less known companion piece for Tse, "Angel in White"(白衣天使), from Tse's perspective, while Tse, over two decades later, followed "Vertigo" with “Taming" (馴服記), a sequel of sorts. "Vertigo" is also Leah Dou's favorite song from her mother's body of work.

While she was under contract with EMI and later Sony, she had an acting career and performed at benefit concerts, including ones that helped those who suffered from AIDS and SARS. She sang on tracks with other celebrities such as Tony Leung, Anita Mui, and Aaron Kwok. She recorded several other solo non-album tracks, such as the eponymous hit theme song to Hero and a Buddhist song containing similar sounds to some of her work on her album Fu Zao. In addition, she recorded a recitation of the Heart Sutra. Meanwhile, her former record companies released several more compilations and boxed sets of her records.

For her Sony album To Love, released in November 2003, she recorded 13 tracks, 10 in Mandarin and 3 in Cantonese. She wrote the music and lyrics for 3 songs, the title track "To Love" (將愛), "Letting Go" (不留), "Sunshine Baby" (陽寶), as well as the music for "April Snow" (四月雪). The three songs with her own lyrics stirred much speculation about their implications of her personal life, as she was in a love quadrangle with Nicholas Tse, Cecilia Cheung, Li Yapeng, though with Li unknown to the public then. "To Love," short for “To Love to the End" (將愛進行到底), the name of Li Yapeng's 1998 breakout show (also known in English as Eternal Love or Cherish Our Love Forever), describes love as a "war." She explained in an interview: "Love itself is not a war, but my love triggered a war. I'm referring to many things attached to love, such as utilitarian and conspiratorial elements, which involve sacrifices. The environment makes love very cruel." "Sunshine Baby," along with the song "MV" (short for "My Valentine") composed by Tse, is sometimes interpreted as her nostalgia for the relationship with Nicholas Tse. "Letting Go," especially in retrospect, is an overture to her then little known life decisions to leave Tse for Li, to leave Hong Kong for Beijing, and, as echoed by "Passenger" (乘客), a cover of Sophie Zelmani's "Going Home," to leave the entertainment business for a new family.

Before the album's release, her Cantonese song "The Name of Love" (假愛之名), with lyrics by Albert Leung, was banned in some areas such as mainland China because the lyrics mentioned opium. According to interviews, she said that she preferred the Mandarin version of the song (the title track); she had penned these lyrics herself, and they made no reference to drugs. The album became more successful than her previous self-titled album, both commercially and critically. Afterwards, she held numerous successful concerts for over a year. Wong was awarded pan-Asian female artist of the year at the sixth CCTV-MTV Music Honors. At the 2004 Golden Melody Awards, she won the Best Female Artist after being nominated multiple times, delivering the now-famous acceptance speech: "I can sing songs. This I know. Now that Golden Melody judges have given me their approval, I approve of their approval."

=== 2005–2009: Hiatus ===
In January 2005, during the last concert of her tour, the usually reticent Wong said something that left her fans wondering: "If I ever retire from showbiz, I hope you all forget about me." After spending the first half of the year in Beijing amid romantic rumors involving Li Yapeng, and with her career largely on hold, Wong's agent Katie Chan confirmed in May 2005 that she was “resting indefinitely.” Two months later, Wong wed Li. She moved from Hong Kong to Beijing after the marriage.

In the four years that followed, Wong would not return, ignoring Live Nation's offer of 100m HKD as well as the 3m-yuan offer for a once-in-a-lifetime opportunity to sing at the Beijing Olympics opening ceremony on her birthday, even though the Beijing native was the choice of over 63% netizens in a CCTV online poll. She did, however, come out to sing "Wishing We Last Forever" in May 2008 at a CCTV fundraising event for Sichuan earthquake victims, and "Heart Sutra" in May 2009 for a Buddhist ceremony at the Famen Temple. In June 2009, a compilation of 3 CDs and 1 DVD of her songs was released by Universal Music.

In March and May 2009, Wong appeared in two B&W International Group commercials, for Royal Wind shampoo and the skincare brand Herborn, earning a combined 23 million RMB. Amid long-standing reports of Li Yapeng's struggling business ventures, the advertisements sparked speculation about her comeback, which her agent Katie Chan soon confirmed. The endorsement later became controversial for raising questions about celebrity credibility after a 2010 Next Magazine exposé alleged that B&W's products were carcinogenic, a claim the company eventually refuted in a 2016 libel case against the magazine in Hong Kong. The deal also led to a contractual dispute after Wong renewed her endorsement with B&W for 30 million RMB in 2011, bypassing the original intermediary, who sued her in Beijing for failing to pay a brokerage fee in 2014; Wong lost the case in 2018.

=== 2010–present: Partial comeback ===
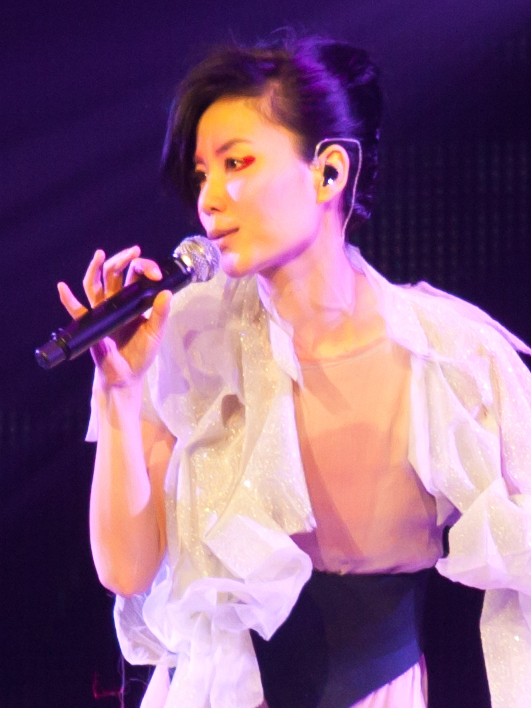
One of Wong's comeback concerts in Hong Kong in 2011. The concert was directed by Wong Kar-Wai.

Wong made her comeback at the 2010 CCTV New Year's Gala, covering Li Jian's ballad "Legend" (傳奇). From October 2010 to June 2012, she embarked on her Faye Wong Comeback Tour 2010–2012 across Asia. Since then, Wong has released new music only sporadically, mostly theme songs for films, including three songs for works by her friend, filmmaker Zhang Yibai. She also recorded the duet “Because of Love” (因為愛情) with Eason Chan, both managed by Katie Chan, for Li Yapeng’s final film Eternal Moment (2011), and later collaborated with Alibaba founder Jack Ma on “Feng Qing Yang” (風清揚), the theme song for Ma's short film Gong Shou Dao (2017). Although her post-comeback releases remain highly popular, some regard them as driven more by personal connections and commercial considerations than by the artistic distinctiveness of her Hong Kong–era work. In addition, Wong has appeared at fashion shows for her favored brand Céline during Phoebe Philo’s tenure, filmed advertisements, and performed at gala events on national TV.

In 2015, a devoted fan, Xie Qi, then a 19-year-old student in Canada, assembled and produced Perfunctory (敷衍), after having secured licenses for the recordings and previously unreleased photographs used as the album cover. In 1997, after Wong left Cinepoly to join EMI Records, the nearly completed album was shelved and its recordings were split across two EPs Toy (玩具) and Help Yourself (自便) and two compilation albums. Xie’s project was presented as an attempt to reconstruct the intended album.

Since 2014, following losses sustained by her boyfriend Nicholas Tse’s business ventures—especially his F/X company Post Production Office, which was acquired by Digital Domain in January 2016—Wong had been planning to stage another concert after her comeback tour. She held a press conference in Beijing on 9 September 2016 to announce her one-time concert, Faye’s Moments Live 2016 (幻樂一場), in Shanghai. The concert generated controversy over its high ticket prices, which had already been reduced by the Shanghai government from even higher proposed rates before their release. It was also criticized for its exclusive, high-society atmosphere, as tickets were mainly distributed through “complimentary offers” and “charitable donations” rather than public sales. The limited availability led to widespread ticket scalping and fueled conspiracy theories about the organizers’ possible complicity, culminating in a government crackdown and a last-minute price crash of unsaleable tickets on the secondary market.

On 30 December 2016, Wong hosted the highly anticipated concert at the Mercedes-Benz Cultural Centre in Shanghai, with a free live broadcast on Tencent Video watched by 20 million online audience and a paid VR live webcast through Digital Domain watched by 88 thousand audience. Her singer-songwriter daughter, Leah Dou, was part of the backing vocalists team. Wong performed several new songs at the concert, opening with "Dust" (塵埃), with her own lyrics comparing herself at this time to a particle of dust: "Blown up and dusted off. Inhaled and exhaled. No meaning, no direction. Don't want anything." She also rendered "Tong's Palace" (童殿), the Mandarin version of Leah's English song "The Way" with the Chinese lyrics by Albert Leung intended as a sequel to "Mortal World" (人間), Wong's song to Leah back in 1998.

The concert received divisive reviews. Singer Gong Linna criticized Wong's "off-pitch" performance, while music critic Liang Huan accused her of using pre-recorded "live" vocals. Singer and producer Tiger Hu stated that Wong did go off-key during the VR live broadcast but explained that the audio fidelity was too high, which is why the stadium audience didn't complain as much as the online audience. Hu believed this highlighted the failure of the VR live broadcast and predicted that fewer singers would attempt it in the future. Nicholas Tse, who is also the Greater China chairman of Digital Domain in charge of the VR live broadcast, defended her on social media, saying, "She sounds great on her own!"

In 2018, Wong participated in two variety shows, Hunan TV's PhantaCity and CCTV-3's National Treasure II. In May, 2020, she was one of the headliners for Alibaba's "Believe In The Future," a three-day online benefit concert for COVID-19 frontline workers. In September, Wong hosted a karaoke live broadcast on the Alibaba-owned platform Youku, teaming up to sing a duet with Jack Ma near the end of the broadcast. On 15 February 2018, Wong and Na Ying reunited after their "Let's Meet in 1998" to perform the song “Years” (歲月) at the 2018 CCTV Spring Festival Gala. On 21 September 2021, Wong was featured in a pre-recorded performance of “Bay” (灣), the theme song of the CCTV Mid-Autumn Festival Gala in Shenzhen, co-hosted by Nicholas Tse. In January 2025, Wong performed a song, “My Gifts from the World" (世界贈予我的), at the CCTV Spring Festival Gala. On July 11, 2025, Wong's first duet with her daughter Leah Dou, “You Are Also Here” (你也在这里), was released as the theme song of the web series Her Way of Survival, in which Dou stars.

In February 2026, Wong performed “The Moment We Experienced Together” (你我经历的一刻), a cover of a song by the band ZaZaZsu, at the CCTV Spring Festival Gala. In May, Wong released the eponymous theme song for the Zhang Yimou-produced television series The Lead (2026), incorporating elements of Qinqiang into the song.

== Acting career ==
Early in her career, Wong acted in Hong Kong TV dramas, such as The Legendary Ranger (1993), The File of Justice II (1993) and Eternity (1994). After establishing herself as a pop diva, she stepped away from television acting until she returned to the small screen in the Japanese drama Uso Koi (ウソコイ, 2001), for which she also sang the theme song "Separate Ways", one of her few Japanese songs.

Wong received international acclaim for her performance in Wong Kar-wai's Chungking Express (1994), which earned her the Best Actress Award at the 1996 Stockholm International Film Festival. Wong Kar-wai praised her performance, calling her "the most unique actress I've ever worked with, because she doesn't try hard to act and she doesn't need to—she's incredibly gifted", adding, "she always finds a way to make the character a part of herself". In 1998, she and Tadanobu Asano were featured in a commercial for Motorola, directed by Wong Kar-wai. In 1999, she began filming Wong Kar-wai's 2046, the sequel to Days of Being Wild (1990) and In the Mood for Love (2000). She worked on the project intermittently over the next few years, when her schedule allowed, until it was completed in 2004.

In 2000, Wong starred alongside Leslie Cheung and Tony Leung Ka-fai in Okinawa Rendez-vous (2000), where she had her first on-screen kiss. In 2002, she co-starred with Tony Leung Chiu-wai, Zhao Wei, and Chen Chang in the comedy Chinese Odyssey 2002 (2002), directed by Jeffrey Lau and supervised by Wong Kar-wai. Her performance earned her a Best Actress nomination at the 22nd Hong Kong Film Awards and the Best Actress Award at the 9th Hong Kong Film Critics Society Awards. In 2004, Wong starred opposite Leon Lai in the romance film Leaving Me, Loving You. In 2022, she was featured in a commercial for skincare brand Helena Rubinstein, directed by Wong Kar-wai.

== Other ventures ==
=== Charities ===
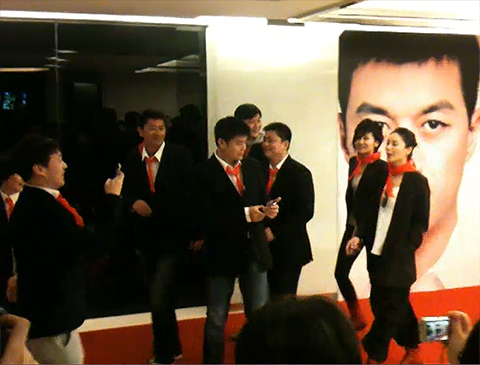
Wong (far right) and friends attend the Beijing premiere of Eternal Moment (starring Li Yapeng), all wearing red scarves which symbolizes youth in China, February 2011

In August 2006, Li Yapeng published a public letter, "Gratitude (感謝)", on his Sina.com blog, showing Wong and his gratitude towards all concerned parties, and confirming rumours that their daughter, Li Yan, was born with a congenital cleft lip. He gave their reason for seeking medical treatment in California: due to the severity of Li Yan's cleft, the reconstructive surgeries she needed were not available in China. Citing a South American folk tale, Li called his daughter a special child and her cleft a mark of an angel. The couple has since established the Smile Angel Foundation to assist children with clefts. On 26 December 2006, Wong made her first public appearance since 2005 at the foundation's inaugural fundraising ball. She opted not to speak or sing, but her new composition "Cheerful Angel" (愛笑的天使) debuted at the event as the charity's official theme song. At the second fundraising ball on 8 December 2007, Wong sang an electronica-infused version of the Diamond Sutra for the event. For the foundation's publicity event on 27–28 November 2008, Wong and her husband visited children in Tibet who were in various stages of recovery after being cured with the charity's help. In May 2008, after the disastrous earthquake in Sichuan, the couple accepted a local girl who lost a leg trying to save her classmates, as she underwent recuperation and treatment in Beijing. The girl returned to her hometown a year later. The Lis agreed to pay for her medical treatment until she turned 22 and visit her at least once a year. In 2012, the Smile Angel Foundation donated 15 million Japanese yen to ChildFund Japan to help needy children after the 2011 Tōhoku earthquake and tsunami. In 2010, the China Social Sciences Press recognised Wong as one of China's 13 "richest souls". In 2012, Smile Angel Foundation established China's first charity paediatric hospital in Beijing. In 2013, Wong and Li topped the inaugural "China Celebrity Philanthropist List" compiled by China Philanthropist magazine. On 19 May 2013, she sang four songs in a memorial concert celebrating Teresa Teng's 60th birthday, with part of the concert proceeds going to the charity.

== Artistry ==
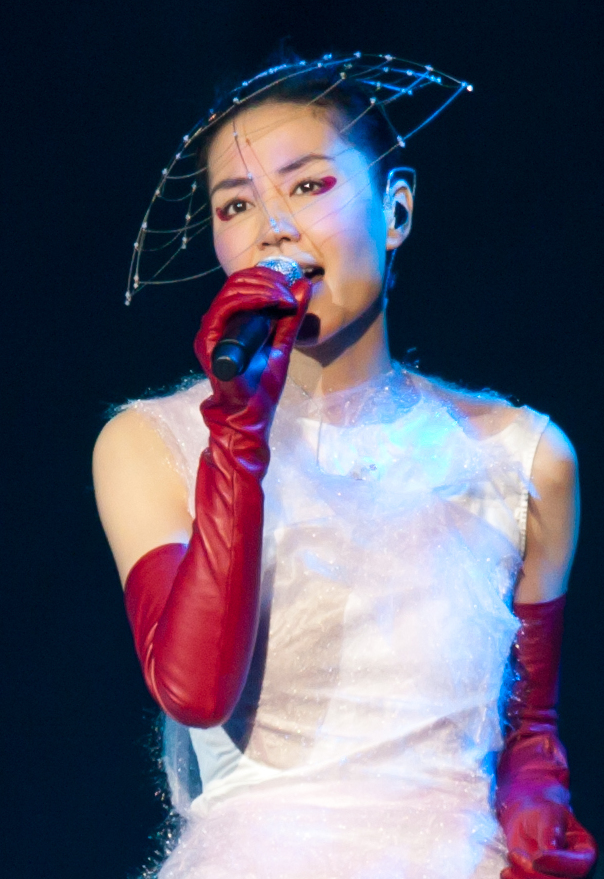
Wong in concert, Hong Kong, 2011

The focus of Wong's concerts has always been on her vocal performance. She seldom dances or speaks to the audience, and there are generally no supporting dancers. There were two exceptions to the latter in the 1994–95 live concerts; first, many dancers joined her on stage for the lively song "Flow Not Fly". In the second half, Wong and a line of male dancers were menaced by a giant mechanical spider overhead during the song "Tempt Me".

Another trademark is her unconventional fashion on stage. Her 1994 concerts were memorable for dreadlocks and extremely long sleeves, as well as for the silver-painted tears. She later said "I wore long sleeves because usually I don't have choreography; I don't know what to do with my hands." Her 1998 concerts saw her sporting the "burnt" cheek makeup, the "Indian chief" look, and the soleless strap-on boots. At the start of her 2003 concerts her headgear was topped by an inverted shoe supporting a very long feather, and her makeup for that concert went through several changes of painted eye-shades.

She does not perform encores, and usually exits by sinking below the stage via a platform. After her release of Miyuki Nakajima's "Mortal World" (人間) in 1997, she ended her concerts for the next few years with this song while shaking hands with the audience, then taking a deep bow to a horizontal position before leaving the stage. However, during her Comeback Tour from 2010 to 2012, she ended with "Flower of Paradise" (彼岸花), a song from the album Fable (2000). She has also given concerts in North America, Australia and Southeast Asia.

== Public image ==
Dutch scholar Jeroen Groenewegen credits Wong's mass appeal to some of her perceived "cool" traits including autonomy, unique artistry and childishness. Katie Chan, Wong's agent, once said "Faye does whatever she wants... it's really quite a miracle that she became a success."

Despite being a favorite target of media and paparazzi, Wong is known for giving terse, direct, and somewhat unexpected answers, if she responds at all, when asked questions. One of her many famous interactions with the media occurred at a 1999 press conference:

Reporter: "Has your divorce [from Dou Wei] been finalized?"
Wong: "What does it have to do with you?"
Reporter: "Our readers want to know."
Wong: "Nothing to do with them either."
Reporter: "But you're a public figure."
Wong: "I'm a public figure so I have to tell you everything? Again, it has nothing to do with you and nothing to do with your readers."

Li Yan, Wong's daughter, was once photographed using a cell phone case featuring the meme of Wong saying, "What does it have to do with you?"

Wong's devil-may-care attitude is as apparent in her public image as in her love life. In 1994, during one of her many trips to Beijing to see Dou Wei—which already strained her relationship with her agency by distracting her from work—Hong Kong paparazzi from Next Magazine followed her and tracked her down. The photographs taken, showing her entering an unhygienic community toilet in a narrow hutong to dump urine—in sharp contrast to the modern and glamorous lives Hong Kong celebrities led—caused quite a stir, with some in Cinepoly fearing that her diva image would be tarnished. But many were impressed by what the diva would do for love, as Taiwanese lyricist Chien Yao, who initially declined to write lyrics for Wong because he never met and knew very little about her, recalled in 2012,

It just happened that I took a business trip to Hong Kong and on the flight back, I saw that tabloid magazine with photos from Beijing, of her coming out in the morning carrying the chamber pot to dump in the public toilet ... That piece from the tabloid moved me ... Such a famous female celebrity, willing to do that, and she only had a 2-day break (from work), most of that time must have been spent traveling. Just to be with (him). So the first line (I wrote down) was, "I'm willing to forget even my name". Also "running towards you", they all describe how I felt when I saw those pictures. That's how I wrote "I'm Willing" (for Faye Wong).

Wong's relationship with Nicholas Tse, spanning over two decades, has become the stuff of popular romance and cemented her image as a woman dedicated to love. The two dated in the early 2000s, split in 2003, married and had children with other celebrities, divorced, and reunited in 2014 after an 11-year breakup. Their reunion, revealed by paparazzi photos of them kissing at Wong's Beijing apartment, caused a sensation but received mixed reactions. At a time when traditional media was declining and social media was on the rise, her reunion with Tse was welcomed by the media and other celebrities, but she faced considerable criticism on Weibo from conservative quarters for prioritizing love over family at her age and from Cecilia Cheung's fans. Not long after, she quit Weibo after having been one of the platform's most active celebrities for years.

== Influence ==
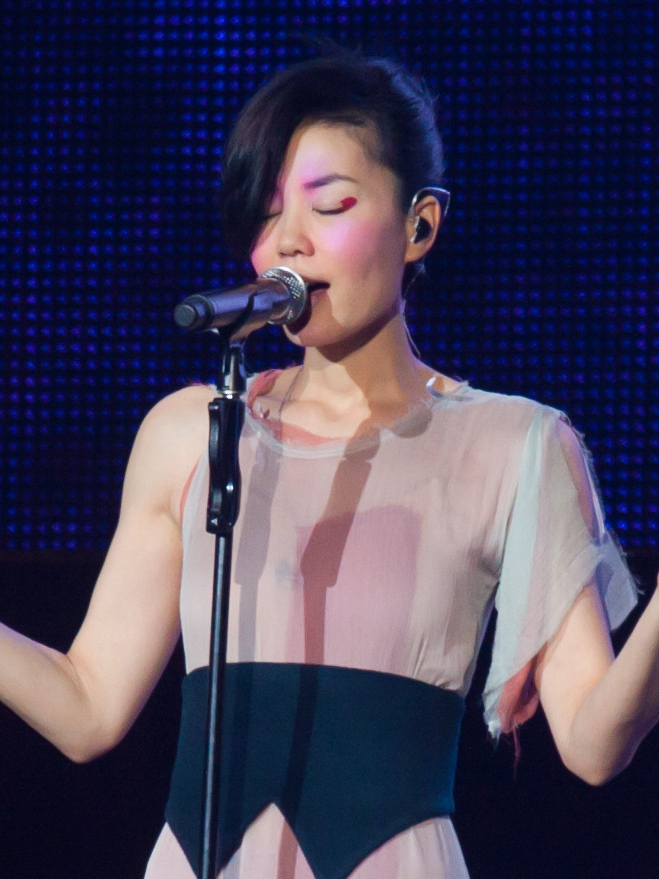
Wong in 2011

In 2004 and 2005, Wong was ranked in the top five on the Forbes China Celebrity 100, as well as in 2011 and 2012 after her comeback. In a 2011 "most popular celebrity in China" marketing study, she was also ranked in the top 5. In 2008, Wong was voted Asia's sexiest vegetarian woman in a poll run by animal rights group PETA. In 2009, to celebrate the 60th anniversary of the People's Republic of China, a government web portal conducted an online poll on The Most Influential Chinese Cultural Celebrity in the Past 60 Years; out of 192 candidates, Wong received over 7 million votes, second only to the deceased Teresa Teng from Taiwan, Wong's own personal idol. In 2014, she was named one of the 10 most admired female singers in Asia by RHA media. Chen Tao, a China Radio International DJ, compares Wong's influence in the Sinophone world to Madonna's in America: "She represents a certain era of pop music, a certain trend, and a vision of being unique."

Numerous artists have released works that paid tribute to her, including "(I Want to See) Faye Wong" by J Church, "Faye Wong" by Green Club Riviera, "Wong Fei, Gwanyu Nei Dik Mei" (王菲，關於你的眉) by my little airport, "Wang Fei de Hui Mou" (王菲的回眸) by YuFeiMen, I Love Faye Wong (我愛王菲), debut album of Maggie Chiang, and "We are Not Romantic in This Age" (在這個年代我們不浪漫) by Easy Weeds. Wong's songs have been covered in other languages, including "Meteor" (流星) in Japanese by Hanayo, "Chanel" (香奈兒) in Korean by Lim Hyung-joo, and "Red Bean" (紅豆) in Vietnamese by various artists. Lene Marlin's "Still Here" is an English cover of "I'm Willing" (我願意). China's 2007 spacecraft Chang'e 1 played Faye Wong's version of "Wishing We Last Forever" (但願人長久).

Universal Music described Wong as “one of the most important figures in Asian pop music. Billboard Japan described Wong as an “Asian pop diva” and a “superstar in the Chinese-speaking world,” noting her popularity in Japan and her influence in the 1990s. In 2000, the Taipei Times described Wong as an “Asian pop diva” and said she had earned the title “queen of Asian pop.”

Japanese director Shunji Iwai had explained that the titular pop-star character of his 2001 film All About Lily Chou-Chou was conceived after attending a Faye Wong concert. Wong's name was also mentioned in the 2003 Japanese film The Blue Light as one of the protagonist's favourites. The female protagonist in the 2013 Chinese film Beijing Flickers was prototyped after Wong, according to director Zhang Yuan, who remembered when he shot his 1993 hit Beijing Bastards with Dou Wei, Wong as Dou's girlfriend would visit the set every day. Japanese singer-actress Hikari Mitsushima said that Wong was her idol and muse; she performed Wong's Cantopop song "Dream Lover," a cover of The Cranberries's "Dreams," at the 2024 Megaport Music Festival, in Kaohsiung, Taiwan. In 2024, the Amazon series Expats features Wong's "Summer of Love." In 2025, the season four finale of the HBO show Hacks features Wong's "Dream Lover." In 2026, Canadian singer The Weeknd released the song "Hong Kong", which samples Wong's "Seasonal Wind" (季候風), on the opening night of his four-show run at Kai Tak Stadium, Hong Kong as part of the “After Hours Til Dawn Tour” world tour.

== Personal life ==
=== Vegetarianism ===
Wong used to be a vegetarian. In 2008 and 2011, she was named Asia's sexiest vegetarian woman by animal rights group PETA.

=== Social media ===
Wong used to be an active Weibo user under the name "veggieg", with a talkative, funny presence online. The Weibo account has not been active since 2015. Wong also has a private Instagram account under the name "feibeing".

=== Religion ===
Wong has been a Buddhist since the early 1990s and has released numerous Buddhist songs. In 2001, she released a Buddhist album, Loving Kindness & Wisdom (悲智雙運), to raise funds for the Nepalese lama Thubten Zopa Rinpoche and to support the construction of the world's largest Maitreya Buddha statue. She also donated an additional 900 million HKD to the project. Wong has been friends with religious figures such as Ogyen Trinley Dorje and Tsultrim Pelgyi Rinpoche, who wrote the lyrics for her song "Prayer" (願).

Wong's religious beliefs have occasionally sparked controversy. In a 2011 Weibo post, Wong associated the power of religion with the survival of a wooden Buddhist object in a fire in Shenyang earlier that year, inciting an online spat with Fang Zhouzi, a popular science writer who ridiculed her belief. Wang Sicong, son of China's then richest man, Wang Jianlin, called her "ridiculous, ignorant, superstitious, and feudal", and "an embarrassment, unworthy of being a diva, only promoting superstitious beliefs and leading Chinese people further away from scientific thinking and lifestyles". In 2013, Wong was involved in a high-profile Beijing News exposé of the self-proclaimed qigong master Wang Lin, who had maintained extensive connections among Chinese officials and celebrities. In 2016, the Chinese government warned Wong and other celebrities against fraternising with the Dalai Lama after she attended a Buddhist assembly in India with members of the Tibetan government-in-exile.

=== Relationships ===
In the early 1990s, Wong had a relationship with Luan Shu, the bassist of the Beijing rock band Black Panther. The relationship prompted Dou Wei, the vocalist, to leave Black Panther in 1991. Wong then started dating Dou and, in June 1996, married him. Their daughter, Leah, was born on 3 January 1997, with the Chinese name Dou Jingtong, meaning "child of Dou and Jing" (from Wong's stage name Jingwen). The baby's voice appears in the song "Tong" on the 1998 album Sing and Play and on the title track of the 1999 album Lovers & Strangers. Wong and Dou divorced in 1999 after Dou had announced his relationship with photographer Gao Yuan, with Wong claiming custody of Leah and waiving child support.

Wong had an on-and-off relationship with Hong Kong star Nicholas Tse from early 2000 to late 2003, until Cecilia Cheung became involved. According to Liang Long, the frontman of Second Hand Rose, he and Wong had a brief relationship during one of her breakups with Tse in early 2003. Later that year, Wong began a relationship with Chinese actor Li Yapeng but did not go public until 2004. They married in 2005, after which she took an extended break from the entertainment industry. In 2006, Wong gave birth to their daughter, Li Yan (Lyla), who was born with a cleft lip. The couple subsequently founded the Smile Angel Foundation to support children with the condition. In 2007, Li Yapeng confirmed that he and Wong were planning for another child. In August 2008, Wong's agent, Katie Chan, confirmed that Wong was pregnant. However, the following month, after reports emerged that Wong had suffered a miscarriage, Chan clarified that it was “a beautiful misunderstanding” and that she had "misheard" the information about the pregnancy. In 2013, Wong and Li announced that they had divorced, with Li claiming custody of their daughter. In 2014, Wong and Tse rekindled their relationship.

== Discography ==
=== Cantonese-language studio albums ===
- Shirley Wong (1989)
- Everything (1990)
- You're the Only One (1990)
- Coming Home (1992)
- No Regrets (1993)
- 100,000 Whys (1993)
- Random Thoughts (1994)
- Please Myself (1994)
- Di-Dar (1995)
- Be Perfunctory (2015)

=== Mandarin-language studio albums ===
- Mystery (1994)
- Sky (1994)
- Decadent Sound of Faye (1995)
- Fuzao (1996)
- Faye Wong (1997)
- Sing and Play (1998)
- Lovers & Strangers (1999)
- Fable (2000)
- Faye Wong (2001)
- To Love (2003)

== Concert tours ==
| Title | Date(s) | Associated album(s) | Continent(s) | Shows | Attendance |
|---|---|---|---|---|---|
| Faye Wong Live in Concert | 13 November 1994 – 10 November 1995 | Sky | North America; Asia | 30 | — |
| Faye Wong Scenic Tour | 10 October 1998 – 23 March 2001 | Sing and Play | Asia; Australia | 46 | — |
| Faye Wong Tour 2001 | 7 September 2001 – 2 November 2001 | Faye Wong | Asia | 6 | — |
| No Faye! No Live! Tour | 20 December 2003 – 8 January 2005 | To Love | Asia | 16 | 480,000 |
| Faye Wong's Comeback Tour | 29 October 2010 – 9 June 2012 | — | Asia | 46 | — |

=== Setlists ===
The following setlists only include songs published in the concert albums, not all songs performed throughout the tours.

Faye Wong Live in Concert (王菲最精彩的演唱會)
1. 夢遊
2. 夢中人
3. 多得他
4. 無奈那天
5. 靜夜的單簧管
6. Medley:
  1. Miss You Night & Day
  2. Summer of Love
  3. 又繼續等
  4. Everything
  5. 不再兒嬉
7. 從明日開始
8. 明天我要嫁給你
9. Medley:
  1. 天與地
  2. 用心良苦
10. Medley:
  1. 如風
  2. 季候風
  3. 有一天我會
  4. 浪漫風暴
  5. Kisses in the Wind
11. 流非飛
12. 愛與痛的邊緣
13. 知己知彼
14. 胡思亂想
15. 誓言
16. 誘惑我
17. 棋子
18. 執迷不悔
19. 容易受傷的女人
20. 冷戰
21. 千言萬語
22. 出路
23. 我願意
Faye HK Scenic Tour (唱遊大世界王菲香港演唱會)
1. Overture
2. 感情生活
3. 浮躁
4. 悶
5. 暗湧
6. 天空 (unplugged)
7. 臉
8. 迷路
9. 夢中人
10. 夢遊
11. 原諒自己
12. 末日
13. 墮落
14. 天使
15. 懷念
16. 夢醒了
17. 但願人長久
18. 情誡
19. 一人分飾兩角
20. 為非作歹
21. Di-Dar
22. 曖昧
23. Bohemian Rhapsody
24. 你快樂 (所以我快樂)
25. Auld Lang Syne
26. 約定
27. 償還
28. 我願意
29. 執迷不悔
Faye Wong Tour 2001 (王菲全面體演唱會)
1. Overture
2. 我願意
3. 再見螢火蟲
4. 悶
5. 矜持
6. Medley:
  1. 半途而廄
  2. 只愛陌生人
7. 開到茶靡
8. 過眼雲煙
9. 流浪的紅舞鞋
10. 新房客
11. 香奈兒
12. 感情生活
13. 掙脫
14. 推翻 (unplugged)
15. 你 (unplugged)
16. 但願人長久
17. 天空
18. Separate Ways
19. 天使
20. Eyes on Me
21. Thank You For Hearing Me
22. 人間
No Faye! No Live! Tour (菲比尋常)
1. Overture
2. 天空
3. 誓言
4. Medley:
  1. 純情
  2. 背影
  3. 夢中人
5. 流浪的紅舞鞋
6. 我願意
7. 假如我是真的
8. 只願為你守著約
9. 但願人長久
10. 新房客
11. 香奈兒
12. 將愛
13. 開到荼蘼
14. 償還
15. 紅豆
16. 暗湧
17. 光之翼
18. 悶
19. Heart of Glass
20. 旋木
21. 只愛陌生人
22. The Look of Love
23. 如風
24. 愛與痛的邊緣
25. 精彩
26. Medley:
  1. 尾班車
  2. 靜夜的單簧管
  3. 守時
27. 約定
28. 給自己的情書
29. 冷戰
30. 人間

== Filmography ==
=== Films ===
| Year | English title | Original title | Role | Notes |
|---|---|---|---|---|
| 1991 | Beyond's Diary | BEYOND日記之莫欺少年窮 | Mary | |
| 1994 | Chungking Express | 重慶森林 | Faye | Nominated – 14th Hong Kong Film Awards for Best Actress; Won – Stockholm Film Festival for Best Actress; Nominated – 31st Golden Horse Award for Best Leading Actress |
| 2000 | Okinawa Rendez-vous | 戀戰沖繩 | Jenny | |
| 2002 | Chinese Odyssey 2002 | 天下無雙 | Princess Wushuang | Nominated – 22nd Hong Kong Film Awards for Best Actress; Won – HK Film Critics Society Awards for Best Actress |
| 2004 | 2046 | | Wang Jingwen | |
| 2004 | Leaving Me, Loving You | 大城小事 | Xin Xiaoyue | |

=== Television ===
| Year | English title | Original title | Role | Notes |
|---|---|---|---|---|
| 1991 | Traces of the Heart | 別姬 | Mei-fong | TVB movie |
| 1992 | File of Justice II | 壹號皇庭 II | Mandy Tong Yuk-man | TVB series |
| 1993 | Legendary Ranger | 原振俠 | Hoi-tong | TVB series (20 episodes) |
| 1993 | Eternity | 千歲情人 | Bou Ging-hung | TVB series (20 episodes) |
| 1994 | Modern Love Story: Three Equals One Love | 愛情戀曲：愛情3加1 | Wun-gwan | one part of TVB series |
| 2001 | Love from a Lie | ウソコイ | Lin Fei | Kansai TV series (11 episodes) |
| 2018 | Phantacity | 幻乐之城 | Herself | Hunan Television series (10 episodes) |

== Awards and achievements ==
Awards and achievements
Top Chinese Music Chart Awards
| Preceded by Stefanie Sun | Best Female Artist, Hong Kong & Taiwan; 2004 | Succeeded by Stefanie Sun |
Golden Melody Awards
| Preceded by Karen Mok | Best Female Artist; 2004 | Succeeded by Stefanie Sun |
