= Faye Wong's Comeback Tour 2010–12 =

Concert tour

Faye Wong Comeback Tour 2010–2012
- Tour by Faye Wong
- Hong Kong promotional handbill
- Location: Asia
- Start date: 29 October 2010
- End date: 9 June 2012
- No. of shows: 46

Faye Wong concert chronology
- No Faye! No Live! Tour (2003–2005); Faye Wong Comeback Tour (2010–2012)

The Comeback Tour (Chinese: 巡唱) was the fifth concert tour by Chinese recording artist Faye Wong, marking her return to public performance after several years of concentrating on her family.

== Background ==
She began her return in February 2010, performing at the CCTV New Year's Gala watched by over 700 million people, covering Li Jian's ballad "Legend". Later in July 2010, she first announced a series of comeback concerts starting from 29 October 2010 onwards, namely 5 in Beijing and another 5 in Shanghai. To satisfy huge overseas market demand, she declared to have more concerts in other cities of Mainland China, Taipei in Taiwan, Hong Kong, Malaysia and also Singapore.

Despite her lengthy absence, interest in the concert tickets was overwhelming: in Mainland China tickets worth nearly 200 million yuan (US$29 million) were taken up in just 10 days while in Taiwan the computerized ticketing system crashed due to excessive traffic, and 90 percent of the tickets were sold within two hours after it was restored. The story repeated itself in Hong Kong, with 93% of the tickets gone in one morning and 2 ticketing phone lines added to the 3 existing one, to catch up with the huge demand.

== Setlists ==
- Faye performed 23 songs for all the concerts except Hong Kong and Zhengzhou, where she performed 24 tracks.
- The intro music of this concert tour was partly extracted from a song called "Vainly Like Dreams (浮华若梦)", which is performed by Kubert Leung, who is also the music director of the tour.
- The music of the interludes were re-composed and partly extracted from a few Faye's songs, namely "Heart Sutra (心经)", "Dream Lover (梦中人)", "The Cambrian Age (寒武纪)" and "Flower of Paradise (彼岸花)".
- The song "Heart Sutra" was not performed live by Faye but rather played as the background music to end the concert. However, this was not done for the first 5 concerts held in Beijing. In fact it was only started since the Shanghai concert, with the original intention of giving condolences to the casualties in the fire accident on 15 November 2010. But, there was an exception to this for the last two concerts held in Zhengzhou, where Faye performed "Heart Sutra" live after the usual ending song "Flower of Paradise".
- The table below only lists down the songs performed live by Faye for all the 46 concerts, excluding the interlude music and songs mentioned previously. The symbol * serves as the key to note the first appearance of the said song in this concert tour.
Set list in Beijing
1. 只願為你守著約
2. 紅豆
3. 乘客
4. 又見炊煙
5. 掙脫
6. 天使
7. Rilkean Heart (Cocteau Twins)
8. 矜持
9. 我願意
10. 傳奇
11. 將愛
12. 開到荼蘼
13. 悶
14. 再見螢火蟲
15. 催眠
16. 天空
17. 但願人長久
18. 當時的月亮
19. 我愛你
20. 人間
21. 新房客
22. 香奈兒
23. 彼岸花
Set list in Hong Kong
1. 約定
2. 償還
3. 乘客
4. 暗湧
5. 夢中人
6. 夢遊
7. 女皇的新衣
8. Rilkean Heart (Cocteau Twins)
9. 曖昧
10. 我願意
11. 將愛
12. 開到荼蘼
13. 大開眼戒（
14. 光之翼
15. 悶
16. 天空
17. 但願人長久
18. 給自己的情書
19. MV
20. 冷戰
21. 人間
22. 新房客
23. 香奈兒
24. 彼岸花

== Tour dates ==
The theme of the concert tour was "Four Seasons and Reborn".

List of concert dates
Date	City	Country	Venue	Attendance
29 October 2010	Beijing	China	Wukesong Arena	50,000
30 October 2010	Beijing	China	Wukesong Arena	50,000
31 October 2010	Beijing	China	Wukesong Arena	50,000
5 November 2010	Beijing	China	Wukesong Arena	50,000
6 November 2010	Beijing	China	Wukesong Arena	50,000
19 November 2010	Shanghai	China	Mercedes-Benz Arena	—
20 November 2010	Shanghai	China	Mercedes-Benz Arena	—
26 November 2010	Shanghai	China	Mercedes-Benz Arena	—
27 November 2010	Shanghai	China	Mercedes-Benz Arena	—
28 November 2010	Shanghai	China	Mercedes-Benz Arena	—
21 January 2011	Taipei	Taiwan	Taipei Arena	33,000
22 January 2011	Taipei	Taiwan	Taipei Arena	33,000
23 January 2011	Taipei	Taiwan	Taipei Arena	33,000
4 March 2011	Hong Kong	China	AsiaWorld–Arena	—
5 March 2011	Hong Kong	China	AsiaWorld–Arena	—
6 March 2011	Hong Kong	China	AsiaWorld–Arena	—
10 March 2011	Hong Kong	China	AsiaWorld–Arena	—
11 March 2011	Hong Kong	China	AsiaWorld–Arena	—
13 May 2011	Guangzhou	China	Guangzhou International Sports Arena	26,000
14 May 2011	Guangzhou	China	Guangzhou International Sports Arena	26,000
27 May 2011	Nanjing	China	Nanjing Olympic Sports Centre Gymnasium	—
28 May 2011	Nanjing	China	Nanjing Olympic Sports Centre Gymnasium	—
2 July 2011	Changsha	China	Hunan International Convention & Exhibition Center	—
3 July 2011	Changsha	China	Hunan International Convention & Exhibition Center	—
26 August 2011	Wuhan	China	Wuhan Sports Center Stadium	20,000
27 August 2011	Wuhan	China	Wuhan Sports Center Stadium	20,000
29 October 2011	Singapore		Singapore Indoor Stadium	6,500
6 November 2011	Kuala Lumpur	Malaysia	Axiata Arena	—
26 November 2011	Harbin	China	HICEC Gymnasium	—
27 November 2011	Harbin	China	HICEC Gymnasium	—
9 December 2011	Chengdu	China	Chengdu Sports Centre	—
10 December 2011	Chengdu	China	Chengdu Sports Centre	—
23 December 2011	Xi'an	China	Qujiang International Convention and Exhibition Center	—
24 December 2011	Xi'an	China	Qujiang International Convention and Exhibition Center	—
18 February 2012	Chongqing	China	Chongqing Olympic Sports Center	—
19 February 2012	Chongqing	China	Chongqing Olympic Sports Center	—
31 March 2012	Kunming	China	New Asia Sports City	—
1 April 2012	Kunming	China	New Asia Sports City	—
20 April 2012	Xiamen	China	Xiamen International Convention & Exhibition Center	—
21 April 2012	Xiamen	China	Xiamen International Convention & Exhibition Center	—
12 May 2012	Dalian	China	Jinshitan Jinshi Cultural Plaza	—
13 May 2012	Dalian	China	Jinshitan Jinshi Cultural Plaza	—
23 May 2012	Hefei	China	Binhu International Convention Center	—
24 May 2012	Hefei	China	Binhu International Convention Center	—
8 June 2012	Zhengzhou	China	Henan Provincial Stadium	—
9 June 2012	Zhengzhou	China	Henan Provincial Stadium	—
