= Dou Wei =

Chinese singer (born 1969)

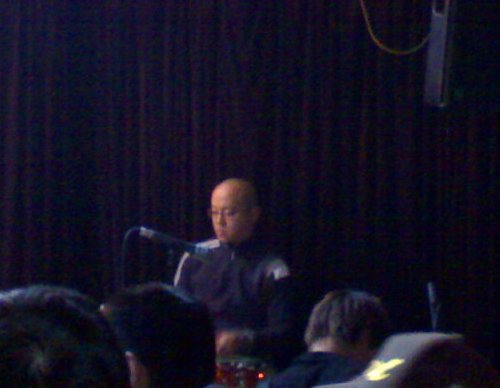
- Dou Wei and band perform, 2007
- Born: Beijing, China
- Occupations: Singer-songwriter, musician, composer, poet, artist
- Years active: 1987–present
- Spouses: Faye Wong (m. 1996; div. 1999) Gao Yuan (m. 2002; div. 2006)
- Children: Leah Dou (daughter) (b. 1997); Dou Jiayuan (daughter) (b. 2002)

Chinese name
- Traditional Chinese: 竇唯
- Simplified Chinese: 窦唯
Transcriptions
Standard Mandarin
- Hanyu Pinyin: Dòu Wéi
Yue: Cantonese
- Jyutping: Dau^{6} Wai^{2}
- Musical career
- Origin: Beijing, China
- Genres: Alternative rock, post-rock, ambient, folk, electronic, Chinese rock
- Instruments: Flute, drums, guitar
- Website: www.dou-wei.com

Dou Wei (born October 14, 1969) is a Chinese musician. He rose to prominence as frontman of the rock band Black Panther and became a leading figure in Chinese rock music during the 1990s. Since the 2000s, Dou has withdrawn from the public eye and focused on experimental music.

== Music ==
Dou first rose to prominence as a frontman of the Beijing rock band Black Panther, with whom he performed from 1988 to 1991. After leaving the band, he signed with Moyan Records and, along with fellow rock musicians He Yong and Zhang Chu, became known as one of the “Prominent Three of Moyan Records.” During the 1990s, Dou also collaborated professionally with Faye Wong, his first wife, most notably on her album Fuzao.

With the release of Sunny Days and Mountain River, Dou began exploring electronic and ambient music. This marked a shift in his musical direction toward ambient, folk, and post-rock styles. His final two vocal albums, Acousma and Rainy Murmur—recorded with the E Band—drew influence from the British post-rock group Bark Psychosis.

Since then, Dou’s music has become increasingly improvisational. He has collaborated extensively and formed the experimental group Indefinite. His 2013 release Golden Curse was described as “a fifty-minute Buddhist metal freakout.” In 2014, he released the one-track album Horoscope, featuring flautist Zifeng and singer-songwriter Moxi Zishi.

== Personal life ==
In July 1996, Dou and Faye Wong married. Their daughter, Leah Dou Jingtong, was born in January 1997. In August 1999, he and Wong finalized their divorce, with Wong gaining custody of their daughter.

Dou married photographer Gao Yuan in June 2002. Their daughter, Dou Jiayuan, was born two months later. They divorced in 2004.

== Controversy ==
=== Storming The Beijing News ===
On May 10, 2006, Dou was arrested after storming the office of The Beijing News, where he destroyed a computer and DVD player, threw water on staff, and set fire to a car outside the building. He claimed his actions were a response to what he described as reporter Zhuo Wei’s false reporting on his relationship with his ex-wife Gao Yuan and his financial situation. The newspaper stood by its report.

== Discography ==
=== Solo albums ===
- 1994 Black Dream (黑梦)
- 1995 Sunny Days (艳阳天)
- 1998 Mountain River (山河水)
- 2004 Eight Fragments (八段锦) (recorded between 1995 and 2003)
- 2013 Yang Jin Mantra (殃金咒)
- 2015 Tian Zhen Jun Gong (天真君公)

=== Collaborations ===
- 1991 Hei Bao (Panther, 黑豹) Black Panther (黑豹乐队)
- 1994 Black Dream (黑梦) Dreaming (做梦乐队)
- 1999 Acousma (幻听) with E Band (译)
- 2000 Rainy Murmur (雨吁) (demo) with E Band (译)
- 2002 Gloriette by Water (水亭) Mu Liang Wen Wang (暮良文王)
- 2003 One Stone, Two Birds (壹举·两得) with Indefinite (不一定) (recorded in 2001)
- 2013 Mu Liang Wen Wang (暮良文王) Mu Liang Wen Wang (暮良文王)
- 2004 The Story Between the Mirror and Flowers (镜花缘记) with FM3
- 2004 Three States, Four Scores (三国·四记) with Indefinite (不一定)
- 2004 Wuque Liuyan (五鹊·六雁) with Indefinite (不一定)
- 2004 Live On (相相生) Mu Liang Wen Wang (recorded in 2002)
- 2004 Qiguo Shengdan (期过圣诞) with Indefinite (不一定) (live at Shenzhen, recorded in 2001)
- 2005 Shan Dou Ji Shi Ye (山豆几石页) Mu Liang Wen Wang (暮良文王)
- 2005 Ji Ran Pin Qi Guo (祭然品气国) Mu Liang Wen Wang (暮良文王)
- 2005 Ba He (八和) with Indefinite (不一定)
- 2005 Jiu Sheng (九生) with Indefinite (不一定)
- 2006 Shui Xian Hou Gu Qing Feng Yue (水先后古清风乐) with Indefinite (不一定) (live at ARK Bar, Shanghai, recorded in 2005)
- 2006 Pilgrimage to the East (东游记) with Wu Na, Wen Zhiyong and Zhang Jian (recorded in 2005)
- 2006 Rainy Murmur (雨吁) with E Band (译) (recorded in 2000)
- 2006 Hou Guan Yin (后观音) with FM3
- 2007 Song Ah Zhu Ah Ji (松阿珠阿吉) with Indefinite (不一定)
- 2007 35651 with Indefinite (不一定)
- 2007 Zorro in China (佐罗在中国) with Indefinite (不一定)
- 2008 Wu Yin Huan Yue (五音环乐) with Indefinite (不一定) and Inequable (不一样)
- 2008 798 with Indefinite (不一定) and Inequable (不一样)
- 2010 Umbrella of Early Spring (早春的雨伞) with Inequable (不一样)
- 2010 Autumn (入秋) with Inequable (不一样)
- 2011 Vocal Music (口音) with E Band (译)
- 2012 Xiao Yue Dong Lu (箫乐冬炉) with Inequable (不一样)
- 2012 Di Yin Xia Shan (笛音夏扇) with Inequable (不一样)
- 2012 2012 Beat (2012拍) with Inequable (不一样)
- 2014 Horoscope (天宫图) with Inequable (不一样)
- 2014 Shan He Diao (潸何吊) with Inequable (不一样) and Leah Dou (vocal)
- 2015 Shu He Yue Ji (束河乐记) with Inequable (不一样)
- 2015 Zheng Yue San Qu (正月散曲) with Inequable (不一样)
- 2016 Fondling Qin on Spring Equinox (春分拾琴图) with Inequable (不一样)
- 2016 Jian Ting Jian (間聽監) with E Band (译)
- 2016 Shi Yin Jian (时音鉴) with Inequable (不一样)
- 2017 Shan Shui Qing Yin Tu (山水清音图) with Inequable (不一样)
- 2018 Farewell 2017 (送别2017) with Inequable (不一样)
- 2018 Ma Gu Fu (麻姑符) with Inequable (不一样)
- 2018 He He Qiu Yue (和合秋月) with Inequable (不一样)

==== With Faye Wong ====
- 1994 Pledge (誓言) (composer and co-arranger)
- 1994 Please Myself (讨好自己) (arrangement)
- 1995 Di-Dar (arrangement)
- 1996 Restless (浮躁) (producer and song arranger)
- 1998 Kid (童) (arrangement)

=== Compilations ===
- 1993 Light of Hope (希望之光) on Rock Beijing (摇滚北京)
- 1995 Lord (主) on Chinese Fire II (中国火II)
- 1997 Gracious Trill (婉啼) on Farewell Zhang Ju (再见张炬)
- 1999 The Grand Joss House (大庙) on Chinese Fire III (中国火III)

=== Other albums ===
- 1993 Dou Wei & Dreaming: guest featuring in the movie Beijing Bastards (北京杂种) (directed by Zhang Yuan)
- 1999 OST: My Favourite Snowy Days (我最中意的雪天) (for the movie What A Snow Day (我最中意的雪天))
- 2001 BOOTLEG: Lamp Whisper Demo (灯语demo) (producer, composer, and arranger)
- 2001 OST: Dazzling (花眼) (for the movie Dazzling (花眼), directed by Li Xin)
- 2001 OST: The Missing Gun (寻枪) (for the movie The Missing Gun, directed by Jiang Wen)
- 2001 Musical Drama Story Between the Mirror and Flowers (镜·花·缘)
- 2001 As the composer for the TV documentary: Huang Xing, a prominent figure during Chinese Revolution of 1911 (百年任务·黄兴)
- 2001 Dou Wei & Indefinite: master and improvisational performance for The Transparent Box (透明的盒子)
- 2002 Rekindled Story Between the Mirror and Flowers (再续镜·花·缘)
- 2005 OST: You and Me (我们俩) (for the movie You and Me directed by Ma Liwen)
- 2009 OST: Beyond the Window (窗外) (for the movie The Equation of Love and Death (李米的猜想), directed by Cao Baoping)
- 2011 OST: Itinerant Swordsman (迷走江湖) (for the movie Dragon directed by Peter Chan)
- 2012 Shang Xia (上下) (soundtracks created specifically for a boutique of SHANG XIA (上下), a brand under Hermès, in Shanghai)
- 2020 Post-Pandemic (后疫) (about COVID-19 in 2020, published in the name of the Chaojian with the partner Wen Zhiyong)
