= Fable (album) =

Fable (寓言)

Studio album by Faye Wong
- Released: 20 October 2000
- Genre: Mandopop, Cantopop
- Length: 57:02
- Label: EMI
- Producer: Faye Wong; Zhang Yadong; Alvin Leong

Faye Wong chronology
Lovers & Strangers (1999)	Fable (寓言) (2000)	Separate Ways (2001)

Fable (Chinese: 寓言; pinyin: Yùyán), alternatively titled Legend, is the eighth Mandarin-language studio album (seventeenth overall) by Chinese singer Faye Wong. There are 12 songs in total: ten in Mandarin and two in Cantonese. The lyrics of two Mandarin songs on the album were rewritten in Cantonese to cater for the Hong Kong market. A "Deluxe" version included a VCD with footage of Faye Wong's commercial for Head & Shoulders shampoo.

== Composition ==
The album can be considered in three sections. The first five tracks deal with certain aspects of Buddhism, incorporating motifs from fairy tales, especially Cinderella. The next three are radio-friendly pop songs. The next two, "Farewell Firefly" and "Book of Laughter and Forgetting," are somewhat more complex musically; they are sung in Mandarin and are followed by alternate versions in Cantonese, "Firefly" and "Love Letters to Myself."

== Songs ==
The first five songs form a song cycle and were composed by Faye Wong herself, marking her further development as a songwriter. Three of them featured as the final segment of every performance in Wong's 2010–2012 Comeback Tour. All the lyrics on the album are by Lin Xi, and tracks 1–5 were produced by Zhang Yadong, both of whom were regularly collaborating with Wong during this period of her career. Alvin Leong produced tracks 6–12.

== Track listing ==
Fable – Standard edition
No.	Title	Unofficial translation	Length
1.	"寒武紀" (Hánwǔjì)	"The Cambrian Age"	5:15
2.	"新房客" (Xīn Fángkè)	"New Tenant"	5:11
3.	"香奈兒" (Xiāngnài'ér)	"Chanel"	4:52
4.	"阿修羅" (Āxiūluó)	"Asura"	4:57
5.	"彼岸花" (Bǐ'àn Huā)	"Flower on the Other Shore"/ "Flower of Paradise"	5:16
6.	"如果你是假的" (Rúguǒ Nǐ Shì Jiǎde)	"If You Were False"	3:57
7.	"不愛我的我不愛" (Bù Ài Wǒ De Wǒ Bù Ài)	"I Won't Love Anyone Who Doesn't Love Me"	4:20
8.	"你喜歡不如我喜歡" (Nǐ Xǐhuān Bùrú Wǒ Xǐhuān)	"Your Likes Are Not as Important as Mine"	4:02
9.	"再見螢火蟲" (Zàijiàn Yínghuǒchóng)	"Farewell Firefly"	5:09
10.	"笑忘書" (Xiào Wàng Shū)	"Book of Laughter and Forgetting"/ "Book of Exhilaration"	4:27
11.	"螢火蟲" (Yìhngfóchùhng)	"Firefly"	5:09
12.	"給自己的情書" (Kāp Jihgéi Dīk Chìhngsyù)	"Love Letter to Myself"	4:27
Total length:			57:02

All songs are in Mandarin except for tracks 11 and 12, which are Cantonese versions of tracks 9 and 10 respectively.

Japanese bonus tracks
No.	Title	Length
13.	"Eyes on Me" (Almighty Radio Mix)	3:59
14.	"香奈兒" (Japanese version)	4:59
Total length:		8:58

Korean bonus track
No.	Title	Length
13.	"Eyes on Me"	5:42
Total length:		5:42

== Release history ==
Region	Release date	Label	Format(s)
Hong Kong	October 20, 2000	EMI	CD+VCD (hardcover version)
Hong Kong	October 20, 2000	EMI	CD (paperback version)
Taiwan	October 20, 2000	EMI	Cassette
Malaysia	October 20, 2000	EMI Malaysia	Cassette
China	October 20, 2000	Shanghai Audio & Video Publishing House	CD
China	October 20, 2000	Shanghai Audio & Video Publishing House	Cassette
South Korea	November 17, 2000	EMI Music Korea	CD
South Korea	November 17, 2000	EMI Music Korea	Cassette
Japan	February 16, 2001	Toshiba EMI	CD
China	2002	Shanghai Audio & Video Publishing House	CD (Special Edition)
