= Zhang Yadong =

- Born: March 11, 1969 (age 57); China
- Occupation: Record producer

Zhang Yadong (Chinese: 张亚东; pinyin: Zhāng Yàdōng, born in Shanxi, China, 11 March 1969) is one of China's best-known record producers, known as "the golden producer".

His mother was a Shanxi Opera singer. He learned the cello from age 8 and began composing when he was 13. From 1991 he worked in music production in Beijing, and he produced his own debut album Ya Tung in 1998.

He has worked with many notable artists of Chinese rock. Among his best known works as a producer are the albums Random Thoughts (1994), Fuzao (1996), Fable (2000) and To Love (2003) for Faye Wong.He has also worked with Dou Wei on his second solo album Sunny Days (1995). His other credits include albums and singles for Xu Wei, Underground Baby, Catcher in the Rye, Thin Man, Pu Shu, Ai Jing, Han Hong, duo Yu Quan, Zhao Wei, Chen Lin, Hannah Kim (金海心), and Wang Feng. Zhang Yadong produced Yang Kun's "Hui Bu Hui" ("Will We"), the theme song for the film Lost in Panic Cruise.

In 2004 he and Song Ke took control of Taihe Rye Music, which was then a subsidiary of Warner Music Group, to make it an independent record label in China. In 2006, Zhang formed another company, "Dong Yue" (Dong's music).
