= Faye Wong discography =

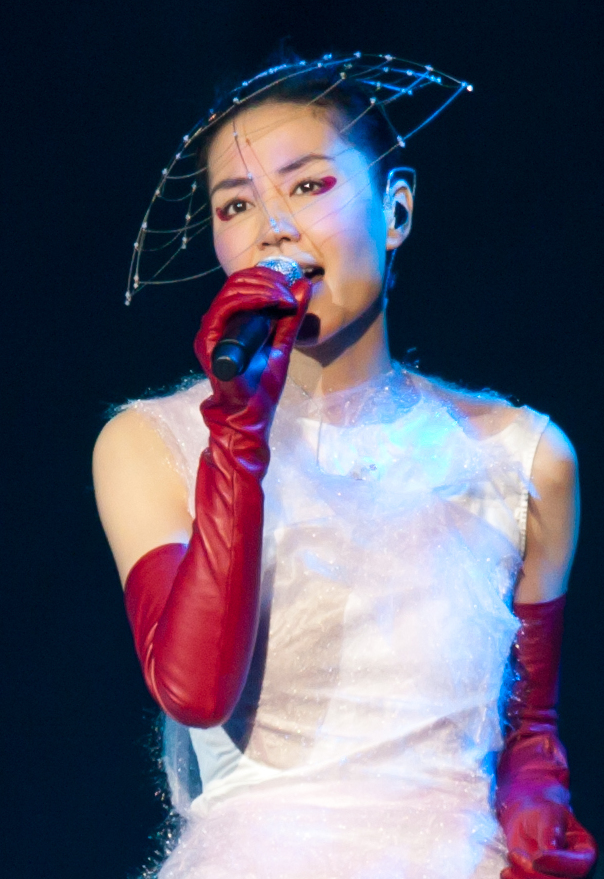
- Wong in 2011
- Studio albums: 6+20
- Extended plays: 5
- Live albums: 3
- Compilation albums: 24

The discography of Chinese singer Faye Wong includes 20 studio albums and 5 extended plays (EP). Wong began recording when she was a high-school student in China, releasing six albums during these years, including many cover versions of hits by Teresa Teng. In 1989, she began her official recording career in Hong Kong with Cinepoly Records. They gave her the stage name Wong Jing Man along with an English pseudonym, Shirley Wong, which was the title of her debut album.

In 1997, Wong signed a 5-album recording contract with EMI. Cinepoly held one final set of recordings for another album but released these in stages on two EPs and on compilation albums, sometimes in competition with new studio releases from EMI. To date, Wong's official record companies have released more than two dozen compilations. Many albums only have official titles in Chinese, and varying translations for some album and song names appear in the media.

== Studio albums ==
=== Cantonese studio albums ===
List of Cantonese studio albums released by Faye Wong
Title	Album details	Peak chart positions	Sales	Certifications
Title	Album details	HK	Sales	Certifications
Shirley Wong (王靖雯)	Released: November 2, 1989; Label: Cinepoly; Format: CD, LP, cassette, digital download	—	HK: 30,000	
Everything	Released: June 1990; Label: Cinepoly; Format: CD, LP, cassette, digital download	—		
You're the Only One	Released: December 1990; Label: Cinepoly; Format: CD, LP, cassette, digital download	—		
Coming Home	Released: August 13, 1992; Label: Cinepoly; Format: CD, LP, cassette, digital download	—		
No Regrets (執迷不悔)	Released: February 5, 1993; Label: Cinepoly; Format: CD, LP, cassette, SACD, digital download	—	HK: 200,000	IFPI HK: 4× Platinum
100,000 Whys (十萬個為什麼?)	Released: September 7, 1993; Label: Cinepoly; Format: CD, cassette, SACD, digital download	—	HK: 150,000	IFPI HK: 3× Platinum
Random Thoughts (胡思亂想)	Released: June 29, 1994; Label: Cinepoly; Format: CD, cassette, digital download	1	HK: 150,000	IFPI HK: 3× Platinum
Please Myself (討好自己)	Released: December 20, 1994; Label: Cinepoly; Format: CD, cassette, digital download	1	HK: 150,000	IFPI HK: 3× Platinum
Di-Dar	Released: December 22, 1995; Label: Cinepoly; Format: CD, cassette, SACD, digital download	1	Asia: 1,500,000; HK: 150,000	IFPI HK: 3× Platinum
Be Perfunctory (敷衍)	Released: November 22, 2015; Label: Cinepoly; Format: CD, SACD, digital download	—		
"—" denotes releases that did not chart or chart did not exist.

=== Mandarin studio albums ===
List of Mandarin studio albums released by Faye Wong
Title	Album details	Peak chart positions				Sales	Certifications
Title	Album details	HK	JPN	MLY	TWN	Sales	Certifications
Mystery (迷)	Released: April 8, 1994; Label: Cinepoly; Format: CD, LP, cassette, digital download	4	—	—	—	TWN: 800,000	
Sky (天空)	Released: November 10, 1994; Label: Cinepoly; Format: CD, LP, cassette, SACD, digital download	2	—	—	—	Asia: 3,000,000; TWN: 1,000,000	
Decadent Sound of Faye (菲靡靡之音)	Released: July 3, 1995; Label: Cinepoly; Format: CD, LP, cassette, SACD, digital download	1	—	—	—	HK: 100,000	
Fuzao (浮躁)	Released: June 3, 1996; Label: Cinepoly; Format: CD, cassette, digital download	2	50	—	14		
Faye Wong (王菲)	Released: September 26, 1997; Label: EMI; Format: CD, cassette, digital download	—	—	6	3	TWN: 450,000	IFPI HK: Platinum
Sing and Play (唱遊)	Released: October 2, 1998; Label: EMI; Format: CD, MD, cassette, digital download	2	38	1	5	Asia: 2,500,000; JPN: 90,000	RIAJ: Gold
Lovers & Strangers (只愛陌生人)	Released: September 10, 1999; Label: EMI; Format: CD, MD, cassette, digital download	1	44	1	1	Asia: 800,000	
Fable (寓言)	Released: October 20, 2000; Label: EMI; Format: CD, MD, cassette, digital download	—	—	—	—		
Faye Wong (王菲)	Released: October 18, 2001; Label: EMI; Format: CD, MD, cassette, digital download	—	19	—	—		
To Love (將愛)	Released: November 7, 2003; Label: Sony Music; Format: CD, cassette, digital download	—	—	2	—	Asia: 1,000,000; CHN: 500,000	
"—" denotes releases that did not chart, chart did not exist, or was not released in that region.

=== Juvenile albums ===
Title	Album details
風從那裏來 (Where the Wind Comes)	Released: March 1985; Label: Yunnan Culture Audio & Video
迷人的卡勒 (Magic Carillon)	Released: October 1985; Label: Yunnan Culture Audio & Video
記得我 (Remember Me)	Released: December 1985; Label: Inner Mongolia Culture Audio & Video
鄧麗君故鄉情 (Teresa Teng's Hometown Love)	Released: 1986; Label: Zhejiang Culture Audio & Video
舞會上的皇后 (Dancing Queen)	Released: 1987; Label: China Audio and Video Press
迷人小姐 – 王菲珍藏集 (Miss Charm – Wang Fei Collection)	Released: 1987; Label: China Film Publishing House

== Live albums ==
Title	Album details
最精彩的演唱會 (Live in Concert)	Released: January 1995; Label: Cinepoly; Format: CD, cassette, digital download
唱遊大世界王菲香港演唱會 98-99 (Faye HK Scenic Tour 98–99)	Released: December 1999; Label: EMI; Format: CD, cassette
菲比尋常Live! (No Faye No Live!)	Released: November 2004; Label: Sony; Format: CD, SACD, cassette

== Remix album ==
Title	Album details	Notes
Mix & Match	Released: December 1998; Formats: CD, cassette; Label: Cinepoly	Also known as Party Mix & 菲電子時代 Techno Faye

== Extended plays ==
List of extended plays released by Faye Wong
Title	Extended play details	Certifications
Like Wind (如風 Autumn Version)	Released: December 1993; Formats: CD, cassette, digital download; Label: Cinepoly	
Faye Disc	Released: May 1994; Formats: CD, cassette, digital download; Label: Cinepoly	
One Person Playing Two Roles (一人分飾兩角)	Released: September 1995; Formats: CD, cassette, digital download; Label: Cinepoly	
Toy (玩具)	Released: February 20, 1997; Formats: CD, cassette, digital download; Label: Cinepoly	IFPIHK: Platinum
Help Yourself (自便)	Released: May 29, 1997; Formats: CD, cassette, digital download; Label: Cinepoly	

== Singles ==
List of singles released by Faye Wong
Title	Year	Peak chart positions	Sales	Certifications	Notes
Title	Year	JPN	Sales	Certifications	Notes
"Sleepwalking" (夢遊)	1994	—			Only released in Japan
"Dreamlover" (夢中人)	1995	—			Only released in Japan
"Eyes on Me"	1999	9	WW: 500,000; JPN: 335,620	RIAJ: 3× Platinum	Title track is the theme song for the video game Final Fantasy VIII.
"Separate Ways"	2001	14			Title track is the theme song for the Japanese TV serial Usokoi
"Orchid Parade" (幽蘭操)	2010	—			Theme song of the film Confucius, digital release
"Legend" (傳奇)	2010	—			Digital release
"Wish" (願)	2012	—			Digital release
"To Youth" (致青春)	2013	—			Theme song of the film So Young, digital release
"One Step Away" (愛不可及)	2014	—			Theme song of the film One Step Away, digital release
"Fleet of Time" (匆匆那年)	2014	—			Theme song of the film Fleet of Time, digital release
"Qing Ping Diao" (清平調)	2015	—			Duet with Teresa Teng, digital release
"Breeze" (清風徐來)	2015	—			Theme song of the film Lost in Hong Kong, digital release
"Dust" (塵埃)	2016	—			Digital release
"You're My Destination" (你在終點等我)	2016	—			Theme song of the film I Belonged to You, digital release
"Feng Qing Yang" (風清揚)	2017	—			Duet with Jack Ma, theme song of the film Gong Shou Dao, digital release
"Forever Young" (無問西東)	2018	—			Theme song of the film Forever Young, digital release
"Times" (歲月)	2018	—			Duet with Na Ying, digital release
"Encounter" (偶遇)	2018	—			Chinese cover of "By the Sleepy Lagoon". Theme song of Hidden Man, digital release
"My People, My Country" (我和我的祖国)	2019	—			Theme song of the film My People, My Country, digital release
"River of Life" (生命之河)	2020	—			Duet with Na Ying. Theme song of the film Leap, digital release
"Hong Kong"	2026	—			Duet with The Weeknd, digital release exlusively in Asia

== Soundtrack albums ==
Title	Album details
Chinese Odyssey original soundtrack (天下無雙電影原聲大碟)	Released: February 1, 2002; Formats: CD, cassette; Label: EMI

== Compilation albums ==
Title	Album details	Peak chart positions
Title	Album details	HK
Shirley Once More	Released: 1991; Formats: CD, cassette; Label: Cinepoly	—
More Shirley	Released: 1991; Formats: CD, cassette; Label: Cinepoly	—
最菲 (Faye Best)	Released: 1994; Formats: CD, cassette; Label: Cinepoly	6
樂樂精選 (Happy Collection)	Released: 1996; Formats: CD, cassette; Label: Cinepoly	3
菲賣品 (Not For Sale)	Released: 1997; Formats: CD, cassette; Label: Cinepoly	6
菲主打 (Best Collection of Faye Wong)	Released: 1997; Formats: CD, cassette; Label: Decca Taiwan / Cinepoly	—
王菲 '89-'97 32精選 (Faye Wong Double Best 89–97)	Released: 1998; Formats: CD, cassette; Label: Cinepoly	—
菲舊夢 (Faye's Old Dream)	Released: 1998; Formats: CD, cassette; Label: Decca Taiwan / Cinepoly	—
The Best of Best	Released: February 17, 1999; Formats: CD, cassette; Label: Polydor	—
但願人長久 (Wishing We Last Forever)	Released: June 10, 1999; Formats: CD, cassette; Label: Cinepoly	—
Ballad Collection	Released: August 11, 1999; Formats: CD, cassette; Label: Polydor	—
菲感情生活 (Life)	Released: September 1999; Formats: CD, cassette; Label: Decca Taiwan / Cinepoly	—
夢中人～グレイテスト・ヒッツ(Dreamlover~Greatest Hits~)	Released: October 17, 2001; Formats: CD, cassette; Label: Polydor	—
王菲好精選 + Music Box (Faye Wong Great Collection + Music Box)	Released: October 26, 2001; Formats: CD, cassette; Label: Cinepoly	—
我的王菲時代 (The Best of Faye Wong)	Released: November 16, 2001; Formats: CD, cassette; Label: Cinepoly / What's Music	—
你王菲所以我王菲 (The Most Favourite Faye)	Released: March 9, 2002; Formats: CD, cassette; Label: EMI	—
Faye Best	Released: September 7, 2002; Formats: CD, cassette; Label: Cinepoly	1
失物招領-王菲 (Lost & Found – Faye Wong)	Released: November 13, 2002; Formats: CD, cassette; Label: Linfair Records	—
王菲2CD精選+DVD (Faye Wong 2CD Collection Plus DVD)	Released: September 24, 2003; Formats: CD, cassette; Label: Cinepoly	—
環球影音啟示錄-王菲 (Sound & Vision Deluxe – Faye Wong)	Released: June 29, 2004; Formats: CD, cassette; Label: Universal	—
國語真經典-王菲 (Classical Mandarin Songs – Faye Wong)	Released: January 27, 2005; Formats: CD, cassette; Label: Universal	—
王菲的故事 (Faye Wong's Story)	Released: April 27, 2005; Formats: CD, cassette; Label: Universal	—
情菲得意 (1st Complete Collection From Faye Wong)	Released: June 23, 2005; Formats: CD, cassette; Label: Universal	—
阿菲正傳 (Memoir of Faye)	Released: June 24, 2009; Formats: CD, cassette; Label: Universal	—

== Box sets ==
Title	Box set details	Note
Complete Shirley	Released: 1992; Label: Cinepoly	Two compilations (Shirley Once More and More Shirley) in one boxed set
Recall	Released: 1993; Label: Cinepoly	The first three Cinepoly studio albums in one boxset
精彩全記錄 (Wonderful Collection)	Released: 1995; Label: Cinepoly	The first eight Cinepoly studio albums in one boxset
王菲唱遊全集 (Faye Wong's Scenic Tour)	Released: March 24, 2004; Label: EMI	All five EMI studio albums in one boxed set; 8 discs in total, including bonus Cantonese EPs from Hong Kong editions of Sing and Play and Faye Wong (2001), and the VCD from Lovers & Strangers
從頭認識 - 王菲 (From Beginning – Faye Wong)	Released: August 26, 2004; Label: Cinepoly	Nine Cinepoly Cantonese studio albums in one boxset

== Other appearances ==
Title	Artist(s)	Album	Notes	Release year
遲到的愛 ("Late For Love")	Wong Yik & Faye Wong	Wong Yik		1990
不可多得 "Can't Have More"	Faye Wong	Cinepoly 5th Anniversary		1990
"Keep It Together"	Softhard & Faye Wong	Cinepoly 5th Anniversary	Cantonese cover version of Madonna's song.	1990
"Everything(Remix)"	Faye Wong	Cinepoly Gold Collection vol.4		1991
愛侶 ("Lover")	Faye Wong	Cinepoly Collection 1992		1992
請勿客氣 ("Don't Be Shy")	Softhard & Faye Wong	廣播道軟硬殺人事件 (Guang Bo Dao Ruan Ying Sha Ren Shi Jian)		1993
非常夏日 ("Very Summer")	Jacky Cheung & Faye Wong	餓狼傳說 (E Lang Chuan Shou)		1994
愛一次給不完 ("Love Takes Time")	Jacky Cheung & Faye Wong	偷心 (Stolen Heart)		1994
流星 (Tats Mix) ["Meteor (Tats Mix)"]	Faye Wong	麻木 (Anaesthesia)		1996
"Serpentskirt"	Cocteau Twins & Faye Wong	Milk & Kisses (Asia edition)		1996
天馬行空之開天闢地 ("Tian Ma Xing Kong Zhi Kai Tian Pi Di")	Leon Lai & Faye Wong	Hong Kong Asian Musicfest '97		1997
相約1998 ("An Appointment With 1998")	Na Ying & Faye Wong	征服 (Conquering)		1998
我愛雀斑 ("I Like Chopin")	Faye Wong	誰可改變 (Shui Ke Gai Bian)	Cantonese cover version of Gazebo's song "I Like Chopin".	1999
星空無限 ("Infinite Starry Sky")	Aaron Kwok & Faye Wong	著迷 (Obsessed)		2000
笑傲江湖 ("Laughing in the Wind")	Liu Huan & Faye Wong	Laughing in the Wind Original Soundtrack	ending theme song of the TV series Laughing in the Wind	2001
Eyes On Me (Orchestra Version)	Faye Wong	Square Vocal Collection	ending theme of the video game Final Fantasy VIII	2001
彌勒佛咒 ("Maitreya Buddha Mantra")	Faye Wong	Loving Kindness & Wisdom		2001
我愛你 ("I Love You")	Faye Wong		theme song of the film I Love You	2002
花生騷 ("Fashion Show")	Anita Mui & Faye Wong	Anita Mui's album of duets, With		2002
"Valentine's Radio"	Faye Wong	Queen's Fellows		2002
英雄 ("Hero")	Faye Wong	Hero Original Soundtrack (non-American edition)	theme song of the film Hero	2002
寬恕 ("Forgiveness")	Faye Wong	趙季平創作歌曲精選 Best Selections of Composition by Zhao Jiping	ending theme song of the TV series Demi-Gods and Semi-Devils	2003
愛笑的天使 ("Smile Angel")	Faye Wong	Smile Angel	theme song for the Smile Angel Foundation, CD given to all donors to the foundation	2006
心經 ("Heart Sutra")	Faye Wong	Smile Angel	first performed live in front of the Famen Temple in 2008; later used by permission in the film Aftershock	2009
我愛你 (Underflow Mix) ["I Love You (Underflow Mix)"]	Faye Wong	潛流 (Underflow)		2009
因為愛情 ("Because of Love")	Eason Chan & Faye Wong	Stranger Under My Skin	theme song of the film Eternal Moment	2011
清靜經	Faye Wong	欒樹·之禮		2016

== Video albums ==
=== Concert tour videos ===
Title	Album details
王菲最精彩的演唱會 (Faye Wong Live In Concert)	Released: January 1995; Label: Cinepoly; Format: DVD, VCD, LD
唱游大世界王菲香港演唱会 98–99 (Faye HK Scenic Tour 98–99)	Released: 1999; Label: EMI; Format: DVD, VCD, LD
全面体演唱會 (Faye Wong Japan Concert)	Released: 2002; Label: EMI; Format: DVD, VCD
菲比尋常Live! (No Faye No Live!)	Released: 2004; Label: Sony; Format: DVD, VCD

=== Music video compilations ===
Title	Album details
王靖雯 MTV & Karaoke (Shirley Wong MTV & Karaoke)	Released: 1993; Label: Cinepoly Records; Formats: LD
Fayvourite Karaoke	Released: 1994; Label: Cinepoly; Formats: LD, VCD
Di-dar Music Video Karaoke	Released: 1995; Label: Cinepoly; Formats: LD, VCD
Best of Faye Wong	Released: 1996; Label: Polydor; Format: LD, DVD(released in 1999)
菲誓言 (Faye's Oath)	Released: 1996; Label: Cinepoly; Format: VCD
菲願意 (Faye's Willing)	Released: 1996; Label: Cinepoly; Format: VCD
菲琳派對 (Party of Faye & Kelly)	Released: 1997; Label: Cinepoly; Format: DVD, VCD, LD
菲時代精選集 (The Best Of Faye Wong Music Video Karaoke)	Released: 1998; Label: Decca Taiwan; Format: DVD
唱遊幻境 Karaoke (Sing and Play in Dreamland Karaoke)	Released: 1999; Label: EMI; Format: DVD, VCD, LD
謎情 王靖雯精選集 (The Best of Faye Wong)	Released: 1999; Label: Decca Taiwan; Format: VCD
只愛陌生人 Karaoke (Only Love Stranger Karaoke)	Released: 2000; Label: EMI; Format: DVD, VCD
寓言+精選 Karaoke (Fable + Greatest Hits Karaoke)	Released: 2001; Label: EMI; Format: DVD, VCD
將愛 All-In (To Love All-In)	Released: 2004; Label: Sony; Format: DVD, VCD
