= 100,000 Whys =

1993 studio album by Faye Wong

Studio album by Faye Wong
- Released: 7 September 1993
- Recorded: 1993
- Genre: Pop
- Length: 45:58
- Language: Cantonese Mandarin English
- Label: Cinepoly

Faye Wong chronology
No Regrets (1993)	100,000 Whys (1993)	Mystery (1994)

100,000 Whys? (Cantonese: 十萬個為什麼; Sapmaan go Waisammo) is the sixth Cantonese studio album by Chinese recording artist Faye Wong. It was released though Cinepoly Records on 7 September 1993. It is named after a popular Chinese science book, One Hundred Thousand Whys by Ye Yonglie.

== Background and release ==
The Japanese version of the album released in April 1994 included three bonus tracks: another version of "Like Wind", a Mandarin version of "Fragile Woman" (from Coming Home), and "Forgetting You Is Like Forgetting Me", the theme from The Bride with White Hair 2.

== Songs ==
The album included several hit singles: "Flow Not Fly", "Summer of Love", "Like Wind", "Cold War", "Tempted Heart" and "Tempt Me". "Flow Not Fly", a lively pop number, became an unofficial anthem for Faye Wong, with the repeated chorus line "Fei Fei" being a pun on the singer's name. "Cold War" is a Cantonese cover of "Silent All These Years" by Tori Amos; a Mandarin version followed on Mystery. The song was a departure from mainstream C-pop, and Wong followed this markedly with further experiments in "alternative music" for her next Cantonese album, Random Thoughts.

The album included four more cover songs. "Summer of Love" is the Cantonese version of Helen Hoffner's 1993 hit. "Like Wind" is a cover of the Mandarin song 猜心 ("Guess my Heart") by One-Fang. "Rainy Days Without You" covers Love Unlimited's "Walking in the Rain (With The One I Love)", and "Do Do Da Da" is The Police's "De Do Do Do, De Da Da Da". "Do We Really Care" was Faye Wong's second song recorded wholly in English, after "Kisses in the Wind" on Coming Home.

== Commercial performance ==
100,000 Whys debuted at number one on the IFPI Hong Kong album chart during the week of 16 September 1993. It remained atop the chart for four weeks and left the top ten after fifteen weeks.

== Usage in media ==
"Tempted Heart" was the theme for the TVB series Eternity, in which Wong also appeared. "Tempt Me" was the theme tune for Joan Chen's 1993 film Temptation of a Monk, and won a Best Movie Song award.

== Live performances ==
Wong's 1994–95 series of concerts at the Hong Kong Coliseum included five songs from the album: the first four, and "Tempt Me" which was extended with a prelude.

== Track listing ==
100,000 Whys – Standard edition
No.	Title	Unofficial translation	Length
1.	"流非飛" (Lau Fei Fei)	"Flow Not Fly"	3:45
2.	"Summer of Love"		4:37
3.	"如風" (Yu Fung)	"Like Wind"	4:29
4.	"冷戰" (Laang Jeen)	"Cold War"	4:12
5.	"長大" (Jeung Dai)	"Grow Up"	4:23
6.	"若你真愛我" (Yerk Nei Jun Ngoi Ngor)	"If You Really Love Me"	4:31
7.	"動心" (Dòng Xín)	"Tempted Heart"	4:02
8.	"雨天沒有你" (Yu Teen Moot Yau Nei)	"Rainy Days Without You"	3:32
9.	"誘惑我" (Yòu Huò Wǒ)	"Tempt Me"	3:55
10.	"Do Do Da Da"		3:45
11.	"Do We Really Care?"		4:27
Total length:			45:38

100,000 Whys – Japanese edition bonus tracks
No.	Title	Unofficial translation	Length
12.	"如風" (Autumn Version)	"Like Wind"	4:33
13.	"容易受傷的女人" (Mandarin Version)	"Fragile Woman"	4:17
14.	"忘掉你像忘掉我"	"Forgetting You Would Be Like Forgetting Me"	4:21
Total length:			13:11

== Charts ==
=== Weekly charts ===
Chart (1993)	Peak position
Hong Kong Albums (IFPI)	1

== Sales and certifications ==
Region	Certification	Certified units/sales
Hong Kong (IFPI Hong Kong)	3× Platinum	150,000^{*}
^{*} Sales figures based on certification alone.

== Release history ==
Region	Release date	Label	Format(s)
Hong Kong	7 September 1993	Cinepoly Records	CD; cassette
China	1993	Cai Ling Audio and Video	CD; cassette
Hong Kong	1994	Cinepoly Records	CD (24K Gold)
Japan	25 April 1994	Polydor Records	CD
Taiwan	1996	Linfair Records	CD
Japan	26 September 1997	Polydor	CD (reissue)
Hong Kong	7 May 2003	Cinepoly Records	DSD
Hong Kong	9 September 2004	Cinepoly Records	SACD
Hong Kong	15 November 2013	Universal Music Hong Kong	CD (Golden Disc Anniversary Series)
Hong Kong	19 June 2015	Universal Music Hong Kong	LP
Hong Kong	12 November 2020	Universal Music Hong Kong	CD (24K Gold-reissue)
Hong Kong	22 April 2021	Universal Music Hong Kong	LP (ARS series)
Japan	16 February 2024	Universal Music Japan	LP
