= Faye Wong (disambiguation) =

Faye Wong (born 1969) is a Chinese recording artist and actress.

Faye Wong may also refer to:

- Faye Wong (1997 album), a Faye Wong album
- Faye Wong (2001 album), a Faye Wong album
- "Faye Wong", a song by J Church from Altamont '99
- "Faye Wong", a song by Green Club Riviera from The Boring Days Are Over Now

== See also ==
- Faye Wong discography
- Wang Fei (disambiguation)
