= One Hundred Thousand Whys =

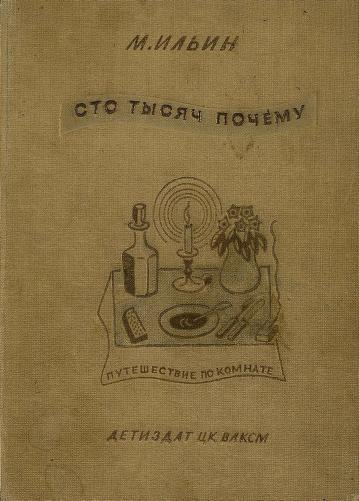
- Author: Mikhail Il'in (Михаил Ильин)
- Original title: Сто тысяч почему
- Genre: Science
- Publication date: 1929

One Hundred Thousand Whys is a popular science book series for children. The series is written by Soviet writer M. Ilin's Сто тысяч почему (Sto tysyach pochemu, literally "A Hundred Thousand Whys"), also published in English as 100,000 Whys: A Trip Around the Room. It was first published in 1929.

== Chinese versions ==
The Chinese title was originally used in 1934 for a version of Il'in's book by Dong Chuncai, published by Kaiming Bookstore. A 1938 translation was also published by Zhen Bin. The Kaiming version was a big hit, so the publisher kept revising it and adding new content. By 1949, it was on its tenth revision.

In 1958, Shanghai Youth and Children's Press planned a large popular science book series and invited over 200 authors to contribute. The first edition was published in 1960, with volumes in Math, Physics, Chemistry, Astronomy and Meteorology, Agriculture, Zoology, Geology, and Health. A third of the book was written by Ye Yonglie, who contributed over 300 topics. By 1964 it had been reprinted 11 times and totalled 5.8 million copies. Six additional volumes were published between 1964 and 1966.

In 1971 the third edition, called the "worker, farmer and soldier" edition, was published by Shanghai People's Press, with 21 volumes. This version has a lot of political content, such as frequent quotes from Mao Zedong. The political content is largely dropped in revisions after the Cultural Revolution.

By 2000, the series had printed over ten million copies and over 100 million volumes. Shanghai Youth and Children's Press tried to trademark the title, but the application was denied because it had become a common book title. There are over 500 versions of books with this title from various publishing houses, according to the Beijing Kaijuan Book Market Research Institute.
