= AMK =

AMK may refer to:

- AMK (band), an indie rock band from Hong Kong
- AnnenMayKantereit, German rock band
- AMK, a Turkish sports newspaper published by the Sözcü group
- AMK Baru, a political coalition in Malaysia
- AMK Ranch, a guest ranch in Wyoming
- Ammattikorkeakoulu, a type of university in Finland
- Ang Mo Kio, a town in Singapore
  - AMK Hub, a suburban shopping mall in Ang Mo Kio
  - Ang Mo Kio MRT station (MRT station abbreviation), a mass rapid transit station in Ang Mo Kio
- Angkor Mikroheranhvatho Kampuchea, a microfinance company in Cambodia
- Antimisting kerosene, an experimental aviation jet fuel
- Anthony McLeod Kennedy (born 1936), former US Supreme Court justice
- N1-Acetyl-5-methoxykynuramine, a metabolite of melatonin
