= Wang Fei =

Wang Fei may refer to:

- Faye Wong (born 1969), Chinese pop singer and actress

== Association football ==
- Wang Fei (footballer, born 1989), Chinese men's footballer
- Wang Fei (female footballer) (born 1990), Chinese women's football goalkeeper
- Wang Fei (footballer, born 1993), Chinese men's footballer

== Other sportspeople ==
- Wang Fei (basketball) (born 1963), Chinese basketball player and coach
- Wang Fei (beach volleyball) (born 1981), Chinese beach volleyball player
- Wang Fei (speed skater) (born 1982), Chinese speed skater
- Wang Fei (cyclist) (born 1987), Chinese road cyclist
- Wang Fei (rower)

== See also ==
- Faye Wong (disambiguation)
- Consort Wang (disambiguation)
