= Sophie Zelmani =

Swedish singer-songwriter (born 1972)

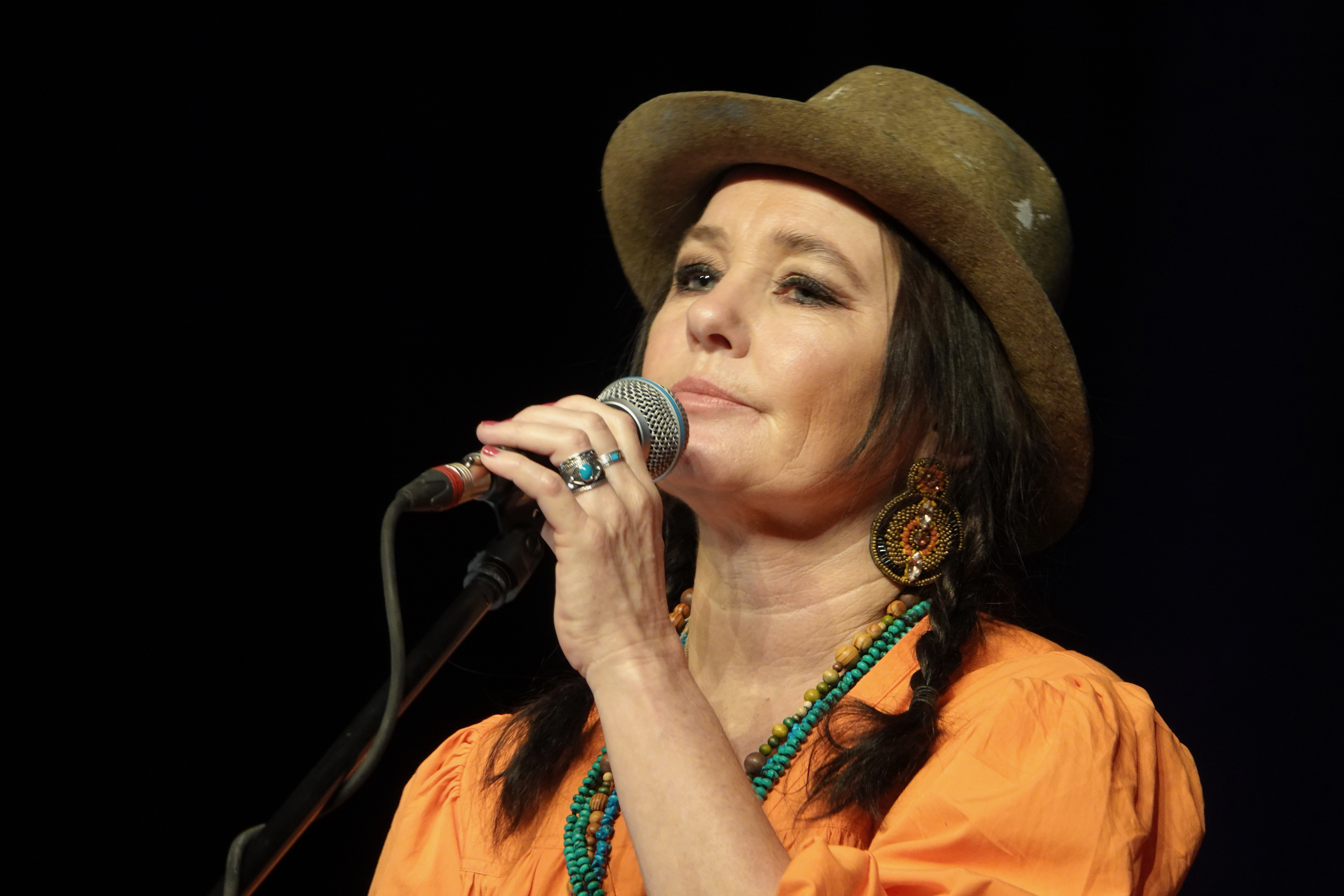

Background information
- Born: Sophie Edkvist; 12 February 1972 (age 53)
- Origin: Sweden
- Genres: Adult alternative, folk
- Occupation: Singer-songwriter
- Years active: 1995–present
- Website: www.sophie-zelmani.com

Sophie Zelmani (born 12 February 1972), later raised with the surname Edkvist, is a Swedish singer-songwriter who released her first single in 1995, called "Always You".

== Early life ==
Zelmani was born in the suburbs of Stockholm in 1972. Her father bought the family a guitar when Zelmani was 14. Despite no professional music training, Zelmani became a songwriter and recorded some songs at a local studio. After she mailed the demos to three record companies, Zelmani was offered a record deal by Sony Music Sweden.

== Career ==
Sophie Zelmani recorded her debut, eponymous album with Sony in 1995. The album was produced and arranged by Lars Halapi and co-produced by Patrik Sventelius. She described the process of making the album: "In the beginning Lars and I spent a few months in the studio. We had fun and then picked the musicians. We recorded in two weeks but the whole thing took half a year." By 1997, Zelmani's debut album had sold 200,000 copies in Europe and Asia Pacific, before moving to the US market, distributed by Columbia Records. Zelmani said, "I had no ambitions to go abroad. I knew I wanted to make a record. That's all I wanted." Columbia's marketing campaign included CD sampler giveaways, consumer press, and rotation on Scandinavian Airlines (SAS) flights between Scandinavia and the US.

Zelmani has continued to record albums while making only a small number of public appearances due to shyness. She won a best newcomer award in Sweden's Grammy Awards in 1996.

== In popular culture ==
Zelmani has also contributed music to the TV series Buffy the Vampire Slayer and Dawson's Creek. Her cover of Bob Dylan's "Most of the Time" appears on the soundtrack to Masked and Anonymous.

Her song "Stand By" appeared in the film Independence Day (1996). Her song "Always You" appeared in the film My Best Friend's Wedding (1997).

Zelmani's "Going Home" from Sing and Dance was covered in Mandarin Chinese as "乘客" (Passenger) and Cantonese as "花事了" (Withered Flower) by 王菲 (Faye Wong) in a 2003 album 将爱 (To Love).

== Discography ==
=== Albums ===
Year	Album	Peak positions					
Year	Album	SWE	BEL (Fl)	BEL (Wa)	FR	GER	SWI
1995	Sophie Zelmani	4	27	27	48	—	—
1998	Precious Burden	11	—	—	—	—	—
1999	Time to Kill	11	—	—	—	—	—
2002	Sing and Dance	3	—	—	—	—	88
2003	Love Affair	2	—	—	—	—	33
2005	A Decade of Dreams 1995–2005	2	—	—	—	—	65
2007	Memory Loves You	2	—	—	—	90	9
2008	The Ocean and Me	1	—	—	—	—	13
2010	I'm the Rain	3	—	—	—	—	21
2011	Soul	12	—	—	—	—	69
2014	Going Home	13	—	—	—	—	—
2014	Everywhere	12	—	—	—	—	—
2017	My Song	8	—	—	—	—	54
2019	Sunrise	23	—	—	—	—	—
2022	The World Ain't Pretty	40	—	—	—	—	—
2025	Lake Geneva	35	—	—	—	—	75

=== EPs ===
- Bright Eyes (2015)

=== Singles ===
Year	Title	Peak positions	Album
Year	Title	SWE	Album
1996	"So Good"	53	Sophie Zelmani

1996 - "You and Him" - UK #92
