= Pornpimol Thammasan =

Thai singer, politician and businesswoman

Pornpimol Thammasan (Thai: พรพิมล ธรรมสาร, nicknamed Koy, born April 11, 1968, in Lampang, Thailand) is a Thai singer, politician and businesswoman of Chinese descent. She is known for the cover version, in Thai language, of the 1979 slow version of the song Rouge (song) by Miyuki Nakajima

== Biography ==
Koy was born in city of Lampang, near Chiang Mai, however she was educated in Bangkok since she was young. She was invited to join The Ovation band in 1987 as a lead singer, replacing former lead singer Patchara Waengwan who became a solo singer after. Later, in 1989, she also left The Ovation and became a solo singer. Her last known work in music career was in 1995.

Her husband is a politician in Pathum Thani Province, which then in 2007 she was elected to be a House of Representatives member in the same province, in People's Power Party, which then moved to Pheu Thai Party in 2011. She also owns three restaurants in Pathum Thani. In 2019, She was elected to Pathum Thani 3rd district during the 2019 Thai general election.
