= Please Myself =

Studio album by Faye Wong
- Released: 20 December 1994
- Recorded: 1994
- Genres: Cantopop; dream pop
- Length: 42:01
- Label: Cinepoly

Faye Wong chronology
Sky (1994)	Please Myself (1994)	Decadent Sound of Faye (1995)

Alternate cover

Please Myself, also translated as Ingratiate Oneself (Cantonese: 討好 自己; Tou2 hou2 zi6 gei2 Jyutping), is the eighth Cantonese studio album by Chinese recording artist Faye Wong. Using the stage name Shirley Wong (王靖雯; Wong Ching Man), the album was released on 20 December 1994, under Cinepoly.

== Background and release ==
Cinepoly Records released this album in December, only a few months after her highly influential alternative music Cantonese album Random Thoughts and her second Mandarin album Sky. It did not match them in terms of commercial success. The album was released with three different album covers.

== Composition ==
Faye Wong composed the songs "Ingratiate Oneself" and "Exit" herself, and these continued her move into alternative music. The remaining songs were more conventional in genre. The lyrics are all in Cantonese except for "Exit" in Mandarin. She spoke rather than sang the words to this song, so that it is sometimes described as a rap. Somewhat pessimistic in outlook, it was not popular with all her fans. Nevertheless, it was a hit single, along with the title track, "Honeymoon" and the ballad "Brink of Love and Pain". "Being Criminal" is a cover of "Here's Where the Story Ends" by the Sundays. "Sky Doesn't Change, Earth Changes" is the Cantonese version of "Amaranthine" (不變, Bù Biàn) on her Mandarin album Sky.

== Critical reception ==
Professional ratings
Review scores
Source	Rating
Pitchfork	7.4/10

In a 2023 review of four reissued Wong albums (Please Myself to Fuzao) by Pitchfork, Michael Hong wrote that the album "sharpened [Wong's] artistic identity" and most of the album consists of a "palette of dazzling dream pop and fond adoration".

== Track listing ==
Please Myself – Standard edition
No.	Title	Length
1.	"Please Myself" (討好自己; Tou hou zigei)	3:17
2.	"Honeymoon" (蜜月期; Mat jyut kei)	4:14
3.	"Being a Criminal" (為非作歹; Wai fei zok daai)	4:07
4.	"I Fear" (我怕; Ngo pa)	4:01
5.	"Exit" (出路; Chūlù)	4:01
6.	"Simplicity is Most Romantic" (平凡最浪漫; Pingfaan zeoi longmaan)	4:24
7.	"Float" (飄; Piu)	3:54
8.	"Brink of Love and Pain" (愛與痛的邊緣; Oi jyu tung dik binjyun)	4:35
9.	"Untitled" (背影; Bui jing)	4:50
10.	"Sky Invariably Changes" (天不變地變; Tin bat bin dei bin)	4:51
Total length:		42:14

Please Myself – Japanese edition bonus tracks
No.	Title	Length
1.	"流非飛" (60's Version)	4:03
2.	"不再兒嬉" (Rock Version)	4:02
Total length:		8:05

== Charts ==
=== Weekly charts ===
Chart (1995)	Peak position
Hong Kong Albums (IFPI)	2

== Sales and certifications ==
Region	Certification	Certified units/sales
Hong Kong (IFPI Hong Kong)	3× Platinum	150,000^{*}
^{*} Sales figures based on certification alone.
