= Chungking Express =

1994 Hong Kong film by Wong Kar-wai

- US theatrical release poster

Chinese name
- Traditional Chinese: 重慶森林
- Simplified Chinese: 重庆森林
- Literal meaning: Chungking (Chongqing) Forest
Transcriptions
Standard Mandarin
- Hanyu Pinyin: Chóngqìng Sēnlín
Yue: Cantonese
- Jyutping: Cung4 Hing3 Sam1 Lam4
- Directed by: Wong Kar-wai
- Written by: Wong Kar-wai
- Produced by: Chan Yi-kan; Jeffrey Lau
- Starring: Brigitte Lin; Takeshi Kaneshiro; Tony Leung; Faye Wong
- Cinematography: Christopher Doyle; Andrew Lau
- Edited by: William Chang; Kai Kit-wai; Kwong Chi-Leung
- Music by: Frankie Chan; Roel. A Garcia
- Production companies: Jet Tone Production Co., Ltd.
- Release date: 14 July 1994 (Hong Kong)
- Running time: 102 minutes
- Country: Hong Kong
- Languages: Cantonese; Mandarin
- Box office: $600,200 (United States); HK$7.6 million (Hong Kong)

Chungking Express (Note: Traditional Chinese: 重慶森林; simplified Chinese: 重庆森林; Jyutping: Cung4 Hing3 Sam1 Lam4; pinyin: Chóngqìng Sēnlín) is a 1994 Hong Kong arthouse romantic anthology film, written and directed by Wong Kar-wai. The film consists of two stories told in sequence, each about a different lovesick Hong Kong policeman mulling over his relationship with a woman. The first story stars Takeshi Kaneshiro as a cop obsessed by his breakup with a woman named May and his encounter with a mysterious drug smuggler (Brigitte Lin). The second stars Tony Leung as a police officer roused from his gloom over the loss of his flight attendant girlfriend (Valerie Chow) by the attentions of a quirky snack bar worker (Faye Wong).

"Chungking" in the title refers to Chungking Mansions in Tsim Sha Tsui, Hong Kong, where much of the action in the first story transpires. It is a place with a reputation as Hong Kong's dark underbelly, rife with crime, sex, and drugs. "Express" refers to the food stand Midnight Express in Lan Kwai Fong, an area in Central, Hong Kong.

The script for Chungking Express was conceived during a three-month intermission during the production of his other work, Ashes of Time; it was developed as a relatively low-budget film and completed within this hiatus with the intention of generating revenue quickly.

The film premiered in Hong Kong on 14 July 1994 and received critical acclaim, particularly for its direction, cinematography, and performances. It has since been regarded as a major work of Hong Kong cinema. Furthermore, in retrospect, it has been regarded by critics as one of Wong's most significant works and a landmark of 1990s world cinema.

In 2022, the film appeared at number 88 on the decennial Sight and Sound critics' poll of the greatest films of all time.

== Plot ==
=== First story ===
Hong Kong police officer He Zhi Wu's girlfriend, May, breaks up with him on 1 April. To verify her earnestness about ending the relationship, Zhi Wu chooses to wait for a month. Every day he buys a tin of pineapples with an expiration date of 1 May, because May enjoyed pineapples and 1 May is his birthday. He decides that if May has not returned by the time he has bought 30 cans of pineapple, he will consider that their relationship to have expired. Meanwhile, a woman in a blonde wig tries to survive in the drug underworld after a smuggling operation goes sour.

On 1 May, Zhi Wu approaches the woman in the blonde wig at the Bottoms Up Club. She is exhausted and falls asleep in a hotel room, leaving him to watch TV and order food. He shines her shoes before leaving her still asleep. She leaves in the morning and shoots the drug baron who set her up. Zhi Wu goes jogging and receives a message from her on his pager wishing him a happy birthday. He visits his usual food store in Chungking Mansions, where he collides with a new staff member, Faye.

=== Second story ===
Another police officer, Cop 663, is also dealing with a breakup—with a flight attendant. Faye secretly falls for him. One day, the flight attendant visits the food store and waits for the man. She learns it is his day off and leaves a letter for him with the store owner containing a set of keys to the officer's apartment.

Faye tells the officer of the letter, but he delays reading it and asks the store to keep it for him. Faye uses the keys to repeatedly enter the man's apartment to clean and redecorate. Gradually, her ploys help him cheer up. He finds Faye coming to his apartment and realises that she likes him; he arranges a date at a restaurant named California. Faye does not arrive, and the store owner, her cousin, goes to the restaurant to tell him that Faye has left for the US state of California. She leaves him a boarding pass drawn on a paper napkin dated one year later.

Faye, now a flight attendant, returns to Hong Kong. She finds that the officer has bought the food store and is converting it into a restaurant. He asks her to stay for the grand opening, and to send him a postcard if she leaves. As Faye is about to leave, he presents the boarding pass, wrinkled and water-stained, and she writes him a new one. She asks him what he wants the destination to be, to which he replies, "Wherever you want to take me."

== Cast ==
- Brigitte Lin as woman in blonde wig
- Takeshi Kaneshiro as Ho Chi Moo/He Zhi Wu, nicknamed Ah Wu, Cop 223
- Faye Wong as Faye
- Tony Leung Chiu-wai as Cop 663
- Valerie Chow as flight attendant who breaks up with Cop 663
- Chan Kam-chuen as manager of the takeaway restaurant Midnight Express
- Thom Baker as double-crossing drug dealer
- Kwan Lee-na as the second May, who works at the Midnight Express
- Wong Chi-Ming as man
- Leung Sun
- Choh Chung-Sing as man

== Themes ==
The film features recurring themes of loneliness, love, memory, and alienation. The film depicts everyday objects as replacements for genuine human connection in times of desperation or emotional uncertainty. In the first story, He Zhiwu's attachment to cans of pineapple (his former girlfriend May's favourite food) and his repeated phone calls to acquaintances show his attempts to cope with emotional loss. The recurring theme of expiration dates, such as the pineapple cans that expire on May 1, reinforce the temporality of relationships and He Zhiwu’s frantic desire to grasp onto them although they have already ended.

Urban space plays a huge role in the film. The iconic line “At our closest point, we were just 0.01 cm apart from each other” highlights the tension between physical proximity and sporadic connections within dense urban areas. Although the film's characters frequently exist in the same physical spaces, they often remain emotionally distant, suggesting that proximity does not necessarily lead to meaningful relationships.The film's depiction of chance encounters and brief interactions emphasizes the nature of urban life, where connections are formed and lost amid the constant fast paced life of the city.

== Production ==
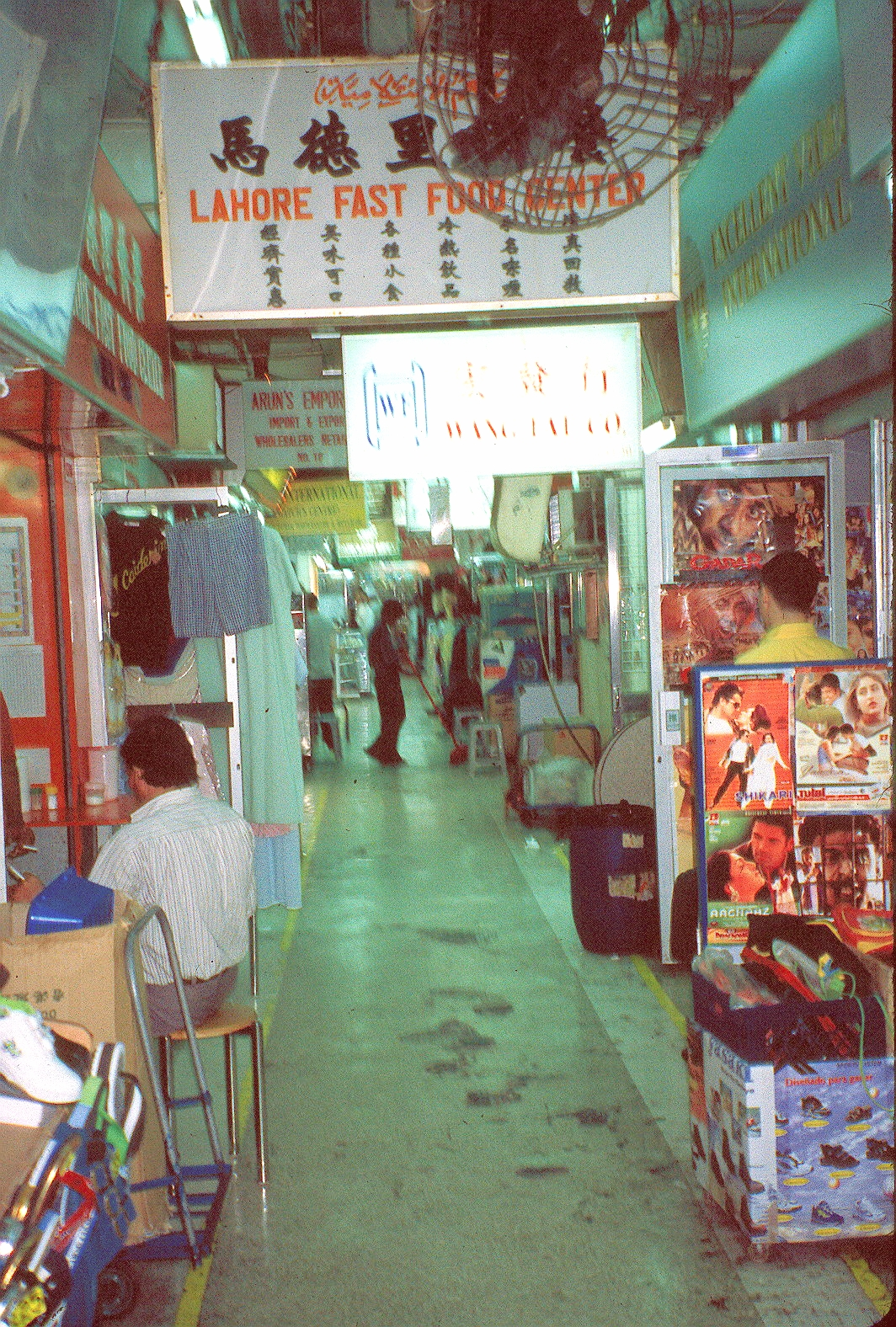
Shops inside Chungking Mansions

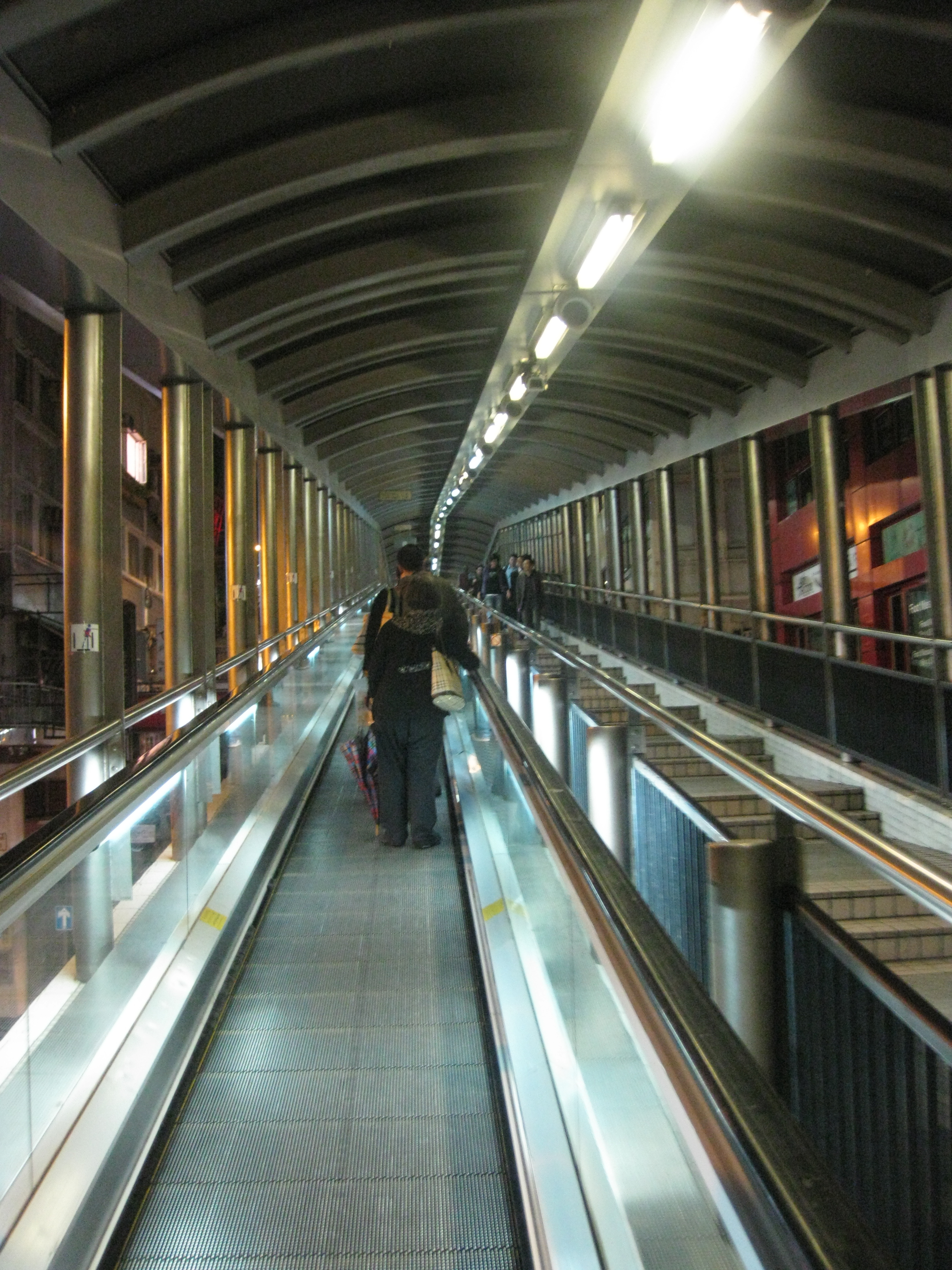
Central–Mid-Levels escalators

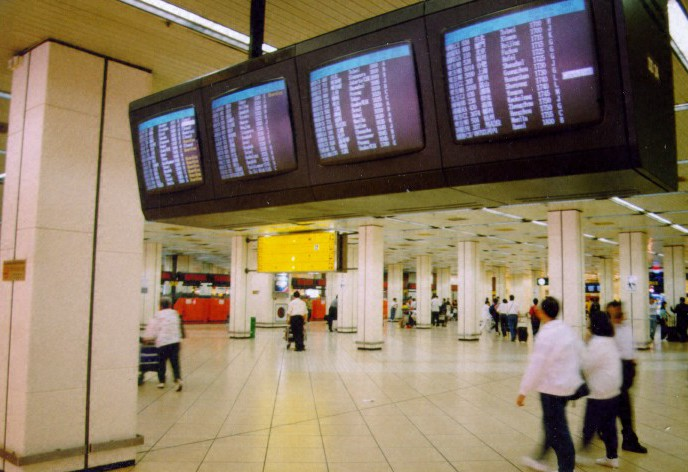
The departure hall of the former Kai Tak Airport is featured in the film

Wong Kar-wai made Chungking Express during a two-month break from editing his wuxia film Ashes of Time. He said: "While I had nothing to do, I decided to make Chungking Express following my instincts", and "After the very heavy stuff, heavily emphasized in Ashes of Time, I wanted to make a very light, contemporary movie, but where the characters had the same problems." Originally, Wong envisioned the stories as similar but with contrasting settings: one in Hong Kong Island in daylight, and the other in Kowloon at night. He felt that "despite the difference, they are the same stories": one was about encountering love in the tight city, the other about keeping love without physical connection.

Wong Kar-wai described Chungking Express as an experiment in telling two interconnected stories within a single film, expanding on ideas he had previously explored in Days of Being Wild. The film's diptych structure, which follows two separate love stories linked by recurring themes and locations, departs from conventional linear storytelling that primarily follows one protagonist. The abrupt transition between the two narratives reflects the unpredictability and transience of urban life.

Chungking Express makes use of step-printing, a cinematographic technique that duplicates individual frames to create a blurred, staccato effect. The technique contrasts relatively stationary characters with the rapid movement of their surroundings. Frequently combined with handheld camerawork, step-printing creates a sense of temporal dislocation by visually stretching and compressing time. Handheld camerawork and natural lighting contribute to its documentary-like aesthetic, aligning the viewers with the characters’ subjective experiences.

The screenplay was not finished by the time filming began; Wong finished it when filming paused over New Year. He wrote the second story in a single day. He developed a third story, about a love-sick hitman, but felt it would make Chungking Express overlong, and produced it as a separate film, Fallen Angels (1995).

Wong wanted to film in Tsim Sha Tsui since he grew up in the area and felt a strong connection to it. He called it "an area where the Chinese literally brush shoulders with westerners, and is uniquely Hong Kong." He was drawn to Chungking Mansion for its many lodgings, mix of cultures, and significance as a crime hotspot; he felt that, as a "mass-populated and hyperactive place", it worked as a metaphor for Hong Kong itself. The place is also home to a large number of people of South Asian descent.

Wong has said he is inspired by the works of Haruki Murakami. As an example, the film's original title "重慶森林" (which translates into "Chungking Forest") mirrors the Chinese title of Murakami's Norwegian Wood (1987), "挪威的森林".

The second story was shot in Central, including Lan Kwai Fong, near the fast food shop Midnight Express. "In this area, there are a lot of bars, a lot of foreign executives would hang out there after work", Wong said. The shop is where Tony Leung's and Faye Wong's characters meet. Wong said he was also drawn to "the escalator from Central to the mid-levels. That interests me because no one has made a movie there. When we were scouting for locations we found the light there entirely appropriate." Leung's character's apartment was cinematographer Christopher Doyle's apartment at the time of filming. Wong narrates the story in fragments connected by monologues.

Released in 1994, the film, which explore themes of anxiety and loneliness, has been interpreted as reflecting the atmosphere of uncertainty and transience that characterized Hong Kong in the years before the 1997 handover.

== Marketing ==
The film's marketing posters were designed by artist Stanley Wong, under his pseudonym "Another Mountain Man". The posters designed by Stanley Wong reflected upon the urban setting of the film and broader themes of contemporary Hong Kong culture.

Beyond Hong Kong, marketing for Chungking Express expanded into the United States as an art-house film. Quentin Tarantino, acquired film distribution rights through Rolling Thunder Pictures, a distribution label which provided an important framework in which American audiences were able to encounter Wong Kar-Wai's work.

Rather than emphasizing the film's overall performance in Hong Kong, American distributors marketed the distinctive visual style of the film and its overall acclaim. Tarantino's endorsement of the film further helped with the introduction of Wong's film and further contributed to overall international growth in the 1990s.

== Soundtrack ==
The main recurring music for the first story is Dennis Brown's "Things in Life". The song "Baroque", by Michael Galasso, is heard twice during the first story: during the opening and when Brigitte Lin's character takes the gun in the closer. This track does not appear on the soundtrack album, but three others are similar to it: "Fornication in Space" (track 3), "Heartbreak" (track 8), and "Sweet Farewell" (track 9), played respectively on synth, guitar and piano.

The song "California Dreamin'" by The Mamas & the Papas plays in key scenes in the second story, which also features Faye Wong's Cantonese cover of "Dreams" by The Cranberries, which is also played over the end credits (titled "Mung Tsung Yan", it is included in her 1994 album Random Thoughts, while her next album, Sky, includes a Mandarin cover).

"California Dreamin'" is played numerous times by Faye Wong's character, indicating "the simultaneity of her aversion to and desire for change". "What a Diff'rence a Day Made", performed by Dinah Washington, is played during a scene between Leung's and Valerie Chow's characters, as well as during an encounter between Leung's and Faye Wong's characters.

The film's soundtrack is widely credited with introducing dream pop to the Hong-Kongese market. Bands featured in the soundtrack, including The Cranberries and Cocteau Twins, saw significant commercial success in Hong Kong after Chungking Express came out, and contemporary Canto-pop stars such as Candy Lo began adopting a more dream-pop sound, such as in Lo's 1998 EP Don't Have to be... Too Perfect and subsequent album Miao...

== Release ==
In August 1994, the film was selected to compete for the Golden Leopard at the 47th Locarno Film Festival.

On 8 March 1996, the film began a limited theatrical run in North America through Quentin Tarantino's Rolling Thunder distribution company under Miramax. The Region 1 DVD was distributed by Rolling Thunder as Tarantino is an admirer of Wong Kar-wai.

Chungking Express was released by The Criterion Collection on DVD and Blu-ray Disc (its first release in that format) in 2008. Criterion has since reclaimed the rights and the film is available on its streaming platform, the Criterion Channel (as of 2022). In 2021, it was remastered and rereleased by Criterion as part of its Blu-ray box set The World of Wong Kar Wai.

== Reception ==
=== Box office ===
Chungking Express had a limited theatrical release in the United States beginning on March 8, 1996. It was distributed by Rolling Thunder Pictures and Miramax. It opened on four screens grossing US$32,779 in its opening weekend, and went on to earn $600,200 domestically across its entire run. Internationally the film performed strongest in South Korea, accumulating a lifetime gross of $2,279,668 across five releases. Other international markets included Italy at $47,219, Portugal at $36,733, and Hong Kong at $169,112. Across all releases, the film has earned a worldwide total of $3,290,727.

=== Critical response and legacy ===
During its release in North America, Chungking Express drew generally positive, sometimes ecstatic reviews from critics. On review aggregator website Rotten Tomatoes, the film holds an approval rating of 89% based on 70 reviews, and an average rating of 7.90/10. The website's critical consensus reads: "Even if all it had to offer were writer-director Wong Kar-wai's thrillingly distinctive visuals, Chungking Express would be well worth watching; happily, its thoughtfully drawn characters and naturalistic performances also pack a potent dramatic wallop." On Metacritic, the film has a weighted average score of 78 out of 100 based on 18 critic reviews, indicating "generally favorable reviews".

Film critic Roger Ebert was measured in his praise (giving the film three out of four stars):

This is the kind of movie you'll relate to if you love film itself, rather than its surface aspects such as story and stars. It's not a movie for casual audiences, and it may not reveal all its secrets the first time through . . . If you are attentive to the style, if you think about what Wong is doing, Chungking Express works. If you're trying to follow the plot, you may feel frustrated ... When Godard was hot, in the 1960s and early 1970s, there was an audience for this style, but in those days, there were still film societies and repertory theaters to build and nourish such audiences. Many of today's younger filmgoers, fed only by the narrow selections at video stores, are not as curious or knowledgeable and may simply be puzzled by Chungking Express instead of challenged. It needs to be said, in any event, that a film like this is largely a cerebral experience: You enjoy it because of what you know about film, not because of what it knows about life.

Rolling Stone's Peter Travers praised the film as both "exasperating and exhilarating":

There is no mistaking Wong's talent. His hypnotic images of love and loss finally wear down your resistance as seemingly discordant sights and sounds coalesce into a radiant, crazy quilt that can make you laugh in awe at its technical wizardry in one scene and pierce your heart in the next.

Janet Maslin of The New York Times criticized the film's MTV-like "aggressive energy":

Mr. Wong has legitimate visual flair, but his characters spend an awful lot of time playing impish tricks. A film in which a man talks to his dishtowel has an overdeveloped sense of fun.

In a 2002 poll published by Sight and Sound (the monthly magazine of the British Film Institute) asking fifty leading UK film critics to choose the ten best films from the previous 25 years, Chungking Express was placed at number eight. In the magazine's 2012 poll to find the most acclaimed films of all time, Chungking Express ranked 144. The film was included in Time's All-Time 100 best movies list in 2005. The film ranked 56th in BBC's 2018 list of The 100 greatest foreign language films voted by 209 film critics from 43 countries around the world.

Academy Award–winning director Barry Jenkins (Moonlight) is said to be influenced by this film.

=== Accolades ===
Awards and nominations
Ceremony	Year	Category	Recipient	Outcome
Chicago Film Critics Association Awards	1997	Best Foreign Language Film	—N/a	Nominated
Chicago International Film Festival	1994	Best Feature	Wong Kar-wai	Nominated
Golden Horse Awards	1994	Best Leading Actor	Tony Leung Chiu-Wai	Won
Golden Horse Awards	1994	Best Feature Film	Chungking Express	Nominated
Golden Horse Awards	1994	Best Leading Actress	Faye Wong	Nominated
Golden Horse Awards	1994	Best Director	Wong Kar-Wai	Nominated
Golden Horse Awards	1994	Best Cinematography	Christopher Doyle, Wai Keung Lau	Nominated
Golden Horse Awards	1994	Best Art Direction	William Chang	Nominated
Golden Horse Awards	1994	Best Film Editing	William Chang, Kit-Wai Kai, Chi-Leung Kwong	Nominated
Golden Horse Awards	1994	Best Original Film Score	Frankie Chan	Nominated
Hong Kong Film Awards	1995	Best Picture	Chungking Express	Won
Hong Kong Film Awards	1995	Best Director	Wong Kar-wai	Won
Hong Kong Film Awards	1995	Best Actor	Tony Leung Chiu-Wai	Won
Hong Kong Film Awards	1995	Best Editing	William Cheung Suk-Ping, Kwong Chi-Leung, Hai Kit-Wai	Won
Hong Kong Film Awards	1995	Best Actress	Faye Wong	Nominated
Hong Kong Film Awards	1995	Best Supporting Actress	Valerie Chow Kar-Ling	Nominated
Hong Kong Film Awards	1995	Best Screenplay	Wong Kar-wai	Nominated
Hong Kong Film Awards	1995	Best Cinematography	Christopher Doyle, Andrew Lau Wai-Keung	Nominated
Hong Kong Film Awards	1995	Best Art Direction	William Cheung Suk-Ping	Nominated
Hong Kong Film Awards	1995	Best Original Film Score	Frankie Chan Fan-Kei, Roel A. Garcia	Nominated
Hong Kong Film Critics Society Awards	1995	Film of Merit	Chungking Express	Won
Locarno Film Festival	1994	Golden Leopard	Wong Kar-Wai	Nominated
National Society of Film Critics Awards	1995	Best Foreign Language Film	Chungking Express	Nominated
Stockholm International Film Festival	1994	Best Actress	Faye Wong	Won
Stockholm International Film Festival	1994	FIPRESCI Prize	Wong Kar-Wai	Won
Stockholm International Film Festival	1994	Bronze Horse: Best Film	Wong Kar-Wai	Nominated

== See also ==
- Chinese Odyssey 2002, another film starring Tony Leung and Faye Wong, produced by Wong Kar-wai
- Cinema of Hong Kong
- Hong Kong in films
