= To Love (Faye Wong album) =

Studio album by Faye Wong
- Released: 7 November 2003
- Recorded: 2003
- Genre: Mandopop
- Length: 56:31
- Label: Sony Music
- Producers: Faye Wong; Zhang Yadong

Faye Wong chronology
| Faye Wong (2001) | To Love (2003) | Be Perfunctory (2015) |

To Love (Chinese: 將愛; pinyin: Jiāng'ài) is the tenth Mandarin studio album (nineteenth overall) by Chinese recording artist Faye Wong. Released on 7 November 2003, it was Wong's first album to be released under Sony Music Asia. It contains thirteen tracks, ten in Mandarin and three in Cantonese. Wong wrote the music and lyrics for three songs, the title track "To Love", "Leave Nothing" (不留) and "Sunshine Dearest" (陽寶), as well as the music for "April Snow" (四月雪). To Love remains the singer's last original album to date.

== Background and release ==
"All-In" versions were issued with the music videos on VCD and DVD. These versions had a different cover with a portrait of Faye Wong printed in black on a red background. Before the album's release, the Cantonese version of the title track "In the Name of Love" (假愛之名), with lyrics by Lin Xi, was banned in some areas such as mainland China and Malaysia because the lyrics mentioned opium. Interviewed in December 2003, Wong said that she preferred her own Mandarin version of the song, which made no reference to drugs.

== Songs ==
Wong said that her favourite track was "MV", written by Nicholas Tse with whom she had an on-off romance. She admitted that her song "Leave Nothing" was a reflection of her love life, but declined to identify the other persons referred to in the lyrics. The album also includes "Passenger" (乘客), a cover of Sophie Zelmani's "Going Home". Asked about the pattern of 2-character titles for the songs, Wong said that this was not important, but reflects a modern habit of abbreviating things in everyday speech.

== Reception ==
To Love was more successful than her previous self-titled album, both financially and critically. It sold more than one million copies in Asia within a week of its release, half of those within China. Afterwards, she held numerous successful concerts for over a year; ticket sales in Hong Kong set a new record. Taipei Times called it a mixture of "saccharine pop and daring avant-garde".

== Accolades ==
Awards and nominations for To Love
| Organization | Year | Category | Result | Ref. |
|---|---|---|---|---|
| Channel [V] Awards | 2003 | 100% Perfect Award | Won | |
| IFPI Hong Kong Sales Awards | 2003 | Top 10 Best Selling Mandarin Albums | Won | |
| Chinese Music Media Awards | 2004 | Top Ten Chinese Albums | Won | |
| Golden Melody Awards | 2004 | Best Pop Vocal Album Award | Nominated | |

== Track listing ==
To Love track listing
| No. | Title | Unofficial translation | Length |
|---|---|---|---|
| 1. | "Jiāng'ài" (將愛) | "To Love" | 4:09 |
| 2. | "Kōng Chéng" (空城) | "Desolate City" | 4:59 |
| 3. | "Bù Liú" (不留) | "Leave Nothing" | 4:23 |
| 4. | "Měi Cuò" (美錯) | "Beautiful Mistake" | 4:02 |
| 5. | "Chéngkè" (乘客) | "Passenger" | 4:40 |
| 6. | "Yáng Bǎo" (陽寶) | "Sunshine Dearest" | 4:06 |
| 7. | "Xuán Mù" (旋木) | "Carousel" | 4:13 |
| 8. | "Sìyuè Xuě" (四月雪) | "April Snow" | 4:28 |
| 9. | "Yè Zhuāng" (夜妝) | "Concealed Night" | 4:35 |
| 10. | "Yān" (烟) | "Smoke" / "Cigarette" | 4:15 |
| 11. | "MV" | | 3:35 |
| 12. | "Gá Oi Jī Mèhng" (假愛之名) | "In the Name of Love" | 4:09 |
| 13. | "Fā Sih Líuh" (花事了) | "Withered Flower" | 4:38 |

Tracks 1–10 are in Mandarin, and the last three are Cantonese. Tracks 12 and 13 are Cantonese versions of tracks 1 and 5 respectively.

== Charts ==
| Chart (2003) | Peak position |
|---|---|
| Malaysian Albums (RIM) | 2 |
| Singaporean Albums (RIAS) | 3 |

== Sales ==
| Region | Certification | Certified units/sales |
|---|---|---|
| China | — | 500,000 |
Summaries
| Asia | — | 1,000,000 |

== Release history ==
| Region | Release date | Label | Format(s) |
|---|---|---|---|
| Taiwan | November 7, 2003 | Sony Music | CD+VCD (first batch of limited hardcover edition) |
| Taiwan | November 7, 2003 | Sony Music | CD (paperback version) |
| Hong Kong | November 7, 2003 | Sony Music Hong Kong | CD |
| Singapore | November 7, 2003 | Sony Music Entertainment Singapore | CD |
| Malaysia | November 7, 2003 | Sony Music Entertainment Malaysia | CD |
| Malaysia | November 7, 2003 | Sony Music Entertainment Malaysia | Cassette |
| China | November 7, 2003 | Shanghai Audio & Video Publishing House | CD (hardcover version) |
| China | November 7, 2003 | Shanghai Audio & Video Publishing House | CD (lite version) |
| China | November 7, 2003 | Shanghai Audio & Video Publishing House | Cassette |
| South Korea | December 12, 2003 | Sony Music Entertainment Korea | CD |
| Taiwan | May 7, 2004 | Sony Music | CD+DVD (All-in Special Collection Edition) |
