= Mystery (Faye Wong album) =

Mystery (迷)

Studio album by Faye Wong
- Released: April 8, 1994
- Genre: Mandopop
- Length: 42:21
- Label: Cinepoly
- Producers: Yangming Huang; Stanley Leung (co-producer)

Faye Wong chronology
100,000 Whys (1993)	Mystery (迷) (1994)	Random Thoughts (1994)

Mystery (Chinese: 迷; pinyin: Mí), alternatively translated as Riddle, is the debut Mandarin studio album (seventh overall) recorded by Chinese singer Faye Wong. It was released through Cinepoly Records on April 8, 1994.

== Songs ==
Although she had included a few Mandarin Chinese songs in her 1993 albums No Regrets and 100,000 Whys, Mystery was her first album recorded entirely in Mandarin rather than the Hong Kong majority dialect of Cantonese. The first track "I'm Willing" (or "I Do") was an instant hit single, and the album brought Wong to fame across the region of East Asia.

The tracks "Drunk" and "Cold War" are covers of Helen Hoffner's "Summer of Love" and Tori Amos's "Silent All These Years" respectively; with which Wong had already scored hits with her Cantonese versions of the songs, included in her 1993 album 100,000 Whys. "Ruanruo" or "Weak" is a cover of "Road", originally by the group Everything But The Girl, and which Faye Wong also covered on her 1993 album, "No Regrets", but sang under the title, "Starting Tomorrow".

== Commercial performance ==
Despite the inclusion of Mandarin versions of that and other Cantonese songs, Mystery was a huge hit, selling over 800,000 in Taiwan alone, making it one of the best-selling albums of all time in Taiwan.

== Covers and usage in media ==
The first track "Wo Yuanyi" was covered in English by Lene Marlin in 2005, in Japanese by JAYWALK in 2002, and in Korean by Seomoon Tak in 2004. It was featured in the following films: Loving Him (2002), Just Another Pandora's Box (2010), Don't Go Breaking My Heart (2011), and I Do (2012), among others.

== Track listing ==
Mystery – Standard edition
No.	Title	Unofficial translation	Length
1.	"我願意(管弦樂版)" (Wǒ Yuànyì (Guǎnxiányuè Bǎn))	"I'm Willing (Orchestral Version)"	4:30
2.	"執迷不悔" (Zhí Mí Bù Huǐ)	"No Regrets" (Note: This is a re-recorded version of the track originally included on the album of the same name)	5:24
3.	"變幻的世界在轉" (Biànhuàn de Shìjiè Zài Zhuǎn)	"A Changeful World Is Turning"	4:08
4.	"軟弱" (Ruǎnruò)	"Weak"	4:25
5.	"我願意(弦樂版)" (Wǒ Yuànyì (Xián Yuè Bǎn))	"I'm Willing (Acoustic Version)"	2:39
6.	"沈醉" (Chénzuì)	"Drunk" (Note: Mandarin version of "Summer of Love", originally included on 100,000 Whys)	4:13
7.	"冷戰" (Lěngzhàn)	"Cold War" (Note: Mandarin version of the track of the same name, originally included on 100,000 Whys)	4:10
8.	"心太野" (Xīntài Yě)	"Wild at Heart"	5:00
9.	"只願為你守著約" (Zhǐ Yuàn Wéi Nǐ Shǒuzhe Yuē)	"I Only Want to Keep A Promise to You"	4:18
10.	"只有我自己" (Zhǐyǒu Wǒ Zìjǐ)	"By Myself"	3:29
Total length:			42:16

Japanese edition bonus tracks
No.	Title	Length
11.	"誘惑我" (Yòu Huò Wǒ)	3:55
12.	"動心" (Dòng Xīn)	4:02
13.	"容易受傷的女人" (Róng Yì Shòu Shāng De Nǚ Rén)	4:18
Total length:		12:15
