= Coming Home (Faye Wong album) =

Studio album by Faye Wong
- Released: 13 August 1992
- Recorded: May 1992
- Genre: Cantopop
- Length: 45:44
- Label: Cinepoly

Faye Wong chronology
You're the Only One (1990)	Coming Home (1992)	No Regrets (1993)

Coming Home is the fourth Cantonese studio album recorded by Chinese singer Faye Wong. It was released on 13 August 1992, after her return to Hong Kong after her year-long stay in New York City. According to The Straits Times, Faye Wong's fourth album, Coming Home, which included the hit song "Fragile Woman", sold 300,000 copies in Hong Kong.

== Background ==
Wong had issued her first three official albums under the stage name Shirley Wong. The cover for Coming Home prominently shows the name "Faye", and from 1994, after the release of Sky she used name "Wáng Fēi" (王菲) on album sleeves.

This album included "Fragile Woman", a cover of a Japanese song "Rouge" composed by the J-pop diva Miyuki Nakajima and sung by Naomi Chiaki. While this song had been covered by other Chinese singers, Wong's version nonetheless swept over Hong Kong and single-handedly lifted her to stardom. It became the No. 1 hit on almost all local radio stations and won Song of the Year at several musical awards. (Thanks to Wong's cover, this 1972 song—in different language versions—would in the early 1990s become a regional hit in Thailand, Vietnam and the rest of Southeast Asia and even Turkey; the most popular English version was titled "Broken-Hearted Woman".) Wong also recorded a Mandarin version of "Fragile Woman", released on her 1994 compilation album Faye Best (最菲).

The album also included her first English-language song, "Kisses in the Wind". Wong stated in a 1994 concert that she very much liked this song, after which various websites listed it as her personal favourite.

== Composition ==
Coming Home was a notable change in musical direction from the more traditional Cantopop fare of her earlier albums. Like them, it incorporated R&B influences.

== Track listing ==
Coming Home – Standard edition
No.	Title	Translation	Length
1.	"浪漫風暴" (Long Maan Fung Bou)	Romantic Storm
2.	"Miss You Night and Day"
3.	"容易受傷的女人" (Jung Ji Sau Soeng Dik Neoi Jan)	Vulnerable Woman
4.	"不相識的約會" (Bat Soeng Sik Dik Joek Wui)	Blind Date
5.	"把鑰匙投進信箱" (Baa So Si Tau Zeon Seon Soeng)	Put the Key in the Mailbox
6.	"這些...那些..." (Ze Se… Naa Se…)	These… Those…
7.	"開心眼淚" (Hoi Sam Ngaan Leoi)	Happy Tears
8.	"重燃" (Zung Jin)	Rekindled Love
9.	"兜兜轉" (Dau Dau Zyun)	Round and Round
10.	"Kisses in the Wind"
