= Rouge (song) =

1977 single by Naomi Chiaki

Single by Naomi Chiaki

from the album Rouge
- B-side: "Kaette-oide"
- Released: April 10, 1977
- Genre: Kayōkyoku
- Label: Nippon Columbia
- Songwriter: Miyuki Nakajima
- Producer: Kawachi Chito

Naomi Chiaki singles chronology
| "Sakabagawa" (1976) | "Rouge" (1977) | "Yoru e Isogu Hito" (1977) |

Audio
- "Rouge" (ルージュ) on YouTube

"Rouge" (ルージュ, Rūju) is a song performed by Japanese singer Naomi Chiaki. It was released as a single from the album of the same name on April 10, 1977 by Nippon Columbia. While the song did not chart as high as other singles, it managed to spawn successful covers in various languages.

== Background ==
The song was written by Japanese singer-songwriter Miyuki Nakajima, who at the time had written successful singles like "Jidai" and "Wakareuta", and provided music for artists such as Naoko Ken and Junko Sakurada. The song revolves on the topic of loneliness, where a girl from the countryside moves to the city to earn a living, but loses her old self as she grows up.

On the other hand, "Rouge" was the first written piece of the Japanese "new music" genre written for Chiaki, who afterwards released several singles of them, including "Yoru e Isogu Hito" written by Kazuki Tomokawa, and "Amagumo" written by Eigo Kawashima.

== Track listing ==
All tracks written by Miyuki Nakajima and Kawachi Chito.

1. "Rouge" (ルージュ)
2. "Kaette-oide" (帰っておいで; "Come Home")

== Faye Wong version ==
"Vulnerable Woman"

Song by Faye Wong

from the album Coming Home
- Recorded: 1992
- Genre: Cantopop
- Length: 4:19
- Label: Cinepoly
- Composer: Miyuki Nakajima
- Lyricist: Yuen-Leung Poon
- Producer: Alvin Leong

Music video
- "Jung4 Ji6 Sau6 Soeng1 Dik1 Neoi5 Jan4" (容易受傷的女人) on YouTube "Róng Yì Shòu Shāng De Nǚ Rén" (容易受傷的女人) on YouTube

Chinese singer Faye Wong recorded a Cantonese-language cover of the song titled "Vulnerable Woman" (Chinese: 容易受傷的女人; Jyutping: Jung4ji6 Sau6soeng1 dik1 Neoi5jan4), appearing on her 1992 album Coming Home.

=== Background ===
Music arranged by Antonio "Tony" Arevalo Jr. It was featured as an interlude song for the Hong Kong television series The Greed of Man. Wong also recorded a Mandarin version titled "Róng Yì Shòu Shāng de Nǚ Rén", which appeared on her 1994 compilation album Faye Best. The cover tells the story of a woman begging her man not to leave.

=== Reception ===
"Vulnerable Woman" achieved success in Hong Kong after its appearance in The Greed of Man, and reportedly led to further covers of the song in various languages.

The song won several awards, including Song of the Year at the 1992 Ultimate Song Chart Awards Presentation held by Commercial Radio Hong Kong.

=== Accolades ===
- 1992 Ultimate Song Chart Awards Presentation (Commercial Radio Hong Kong) – Song of the Year
- 1992 Ultimate Song Chart Awards Presentation (Commercial Radio Hong Kong) – National Professional Bronze Award
- 1992 Jade Solid Gold Best Ten Music Awards Presentation (TVB) – Top Ten Songs
- 1992 Jade Solid Gold Best Ten Music Awards Presentation (TVB) – Best Lyricist (Yuen-Leung Poon)
- 1992 RTHK Top 10 Gold Songs Awards (RTHK) – Top 10 Songs

== Như Quỳnh version ==
"Người tình mùa đông"

Single by Như Quỳnh

from the album Chuyện hoa sim
- Released: 1994
- Recorded: 1994
- Genre: Pop
- Length: 4:14
- Label: Asia Entertainment
- Composer: Miyuki Nakajima
- Lyricist: Anh Bằng
- Producer: Trúc Sinh

Như Quỳnh singles chronology
| "Người tình mùa đông" (1994) | "Chuyện hoa sim" (1995) |

Music video
- "Người tình mùa đông" Như Quỳnh on YouTube

Vietnamese singer Như Quỳnh recorded a Vietnamese-language cover as her debut single "Người tình mùa đông" (English: "Winter lovers"), appearing on her 1995 debut album Chuyện hoa sim.

=== Background ===
Lyrics were written by songwriter Anh Bằng, who founded Asia Entertainment in 1980, and would proceed to compose music for her signature song "Chuyện hoa sim". The lyrics talk about unrequited love that is generously compared to the coldness of winter. Như Quỳnh first performed "Người tình mùa đông" at the concert Asia 6: Giáng sinh đặc biệt (English: "Asia 6: Christmas special") in 1994, in favor of "Chuyện hoa sim" (which would be performed at the next rendition of the show). The song's performance would later be released on video in 1995.

In September 2014, Như Quỳnh performed an alternate cover titled "Còn mãi mùa đông" (English: "Winter forever") on the 114th edition of the Thúy Nga production Paris by Night, with Vietnamese lyrics written by Thái Thịnh.

=== Reception ===
"Người tình mùa đông" has been considered the song that brought Như Quỳnh to success for overseas Vietnamese music, along with her signature song "Chuyện hoa sim". A 2018 live performance of the song, where Như Quỳnh wore the same outfit from her first performance with Asia Entertainment, received a positive response, including surprise that the singer managed to retain her vocal ability after over twenty years.

Her debut performance of the song was uploaded to YouTube on December 5, 2015, and has since attained over 35 million views as of August 31, 2026, becoming her most popular song under Asia Entertainment.

== Other cover versions ==
- Nakajima covered the song herself on her 1979 cover album Okaerinasai.
- Naoko Ken covered the song on her 1984 cover album Again.
- Singaporean band Tokyo Square covered the song in English twice as "That is Love" and "Keep On Loving You".
- Jessica Jay covered the song in English as "Broken Hearted Woman".
- Yonca Evcimik covered this song in Turkish as "8:15 Vapuru" (8:15 Ferry).
- Aye Chan May covered the song in Burmese as "Broken as A Piece".
- Don Sonrabiab covered the song in Thai as "Jeb Gwa Thoe" (More sad than you). Later, this song was covered by Pornpimol Thammasan and was renamed as "Kueab Ja Sai" (Almost too late).
- A techno rap Khmu version called "ຊຽວ ຕະມອງ", performed by a Laos female singer.
- Samuel Tai released a Mandarin version titled "情人之間的情人" (The Lover Between Lovers) on his 1993 album 找一個字代替 (Find a Word to Replace).

== See also ==
- 1977 in Japanese music
