= Rolling Thunder Pictures =

Film distribution company

- Founded: 1995; 31 years ago
- Founder: Quentin Tarantino
- Defunct: 1999; 27 years ago
- Fate: Defunct
- Key people: Jerry Martinez; Quentin Tarantino

Rolling Thunder Pictures was a film distribution company, set up under Miramax Films by Quentin Tarantino, that was headed by Jerry Martinez and Tarantino. It specialized on releasing independent, cult, or foreign films to theaters. The company was created in 1995 but closed in 1999. The company was named after the film Rolling Thunder.

== Releases ==
The following films were re-released under the Rolling Thunder Pictures label:

- The Beyond (in association with Grindhouse Releasing)
- Chungking Express
- Detroit 9000
- Mighty Peking Man
- Sonatine
- Switchblade Sisters

The label also released the independent films Hard Core Logo and Curdled. The 1994 Jet Li film Fist of Legend had been scheduled for a Rolling Thunder Pictures release, but eventually Dimension Films released it. Other production companies re-released on DVD later.

== Quentin Tarantino's Rolling Thunder Pictures Triple Feature ==
On April 16, 2013, coinciding with the release of Django Unchained, Miramax and Lions Gate released a special DVD set of three films previously released under the Rolling Thunder Pictures label. The set includes The Mighty Peking Man, a King Kong knock-off; Detroit 9000, a detective-style blaxploitation film; and Switchblade Sisters, an obvious inspiration for Tarantino's films. Tarantino said of the collection "If you like my stuff, you can look at it as – this is where mine came from."

== Further References ==
- Retrospective page at the Quentin Tarantino Archives
- List of Rolling Thunder Films in the Grindhouse Cinema Database
- DJANGO and QT’s Rolling Thunder triple feature released today
