= The Ovation =

The Ovation, more commonly known as Ovation, was a Thai music band from 1982 to 1992. From 1982 to 1988, the band was in Nititad Promotion record label, and from 1989 to 1992 was in Pro Media Mart record label. The band consists of seven members.

== History ==
The band was debut in 1982, and in 1985 Waiyawut Sakunsapphaisan, brother of Wirun Sakkunsapphaisan became the lead male singer with Patchara Wangwan as the lead female singer. The band releases an album once a year. The lead female singer was changed three times, first time in 1987 to Pornpimon Tummasarn.

After Pornpimon left the band in 1989, the band has ended contract with Nititad Promotion, forcing it to be moved to Pro Media Mart, a smaller record label. The band was then go into the decline. The last album Ovation 212, released in 1992, has had less sales than ever.

== Band members ==
- Charin Suwannarak (born September 19, 1958) pianist and lead male singer
- Wisut Yaemoepsin (born July 16, 1956) guitarist
- Wisut Limpinan (born July 10, 1957) guitarist
- Prasert Chimthuam (born August 19, 1960) saxophone, flutist, keyboard
- Anan Aksonpinit (born July 20, 1958) bass
- Sumet Phikunyaem (born July 21, 1958) drummer (until 1986)
- Waiyawut Sakunsapphaisan keyboard and lead male singer (since 1985)
- Uaichai Prakhongsin drummer (since 1987)
- Patchara Wangwan (August 3, 1964 - October 10, 2012) lead female singer (1982 to 1987)
- Pornpimol Thammasan (born April 11, 1968) lead female singer (1987 to 1989)
- Phanitda Nilrat Na Ayudhya lead female singer (1989)
- Nongnuch Chuenkrachang lead female singer (1991 to 1992)
