= Chinese Society of Education =

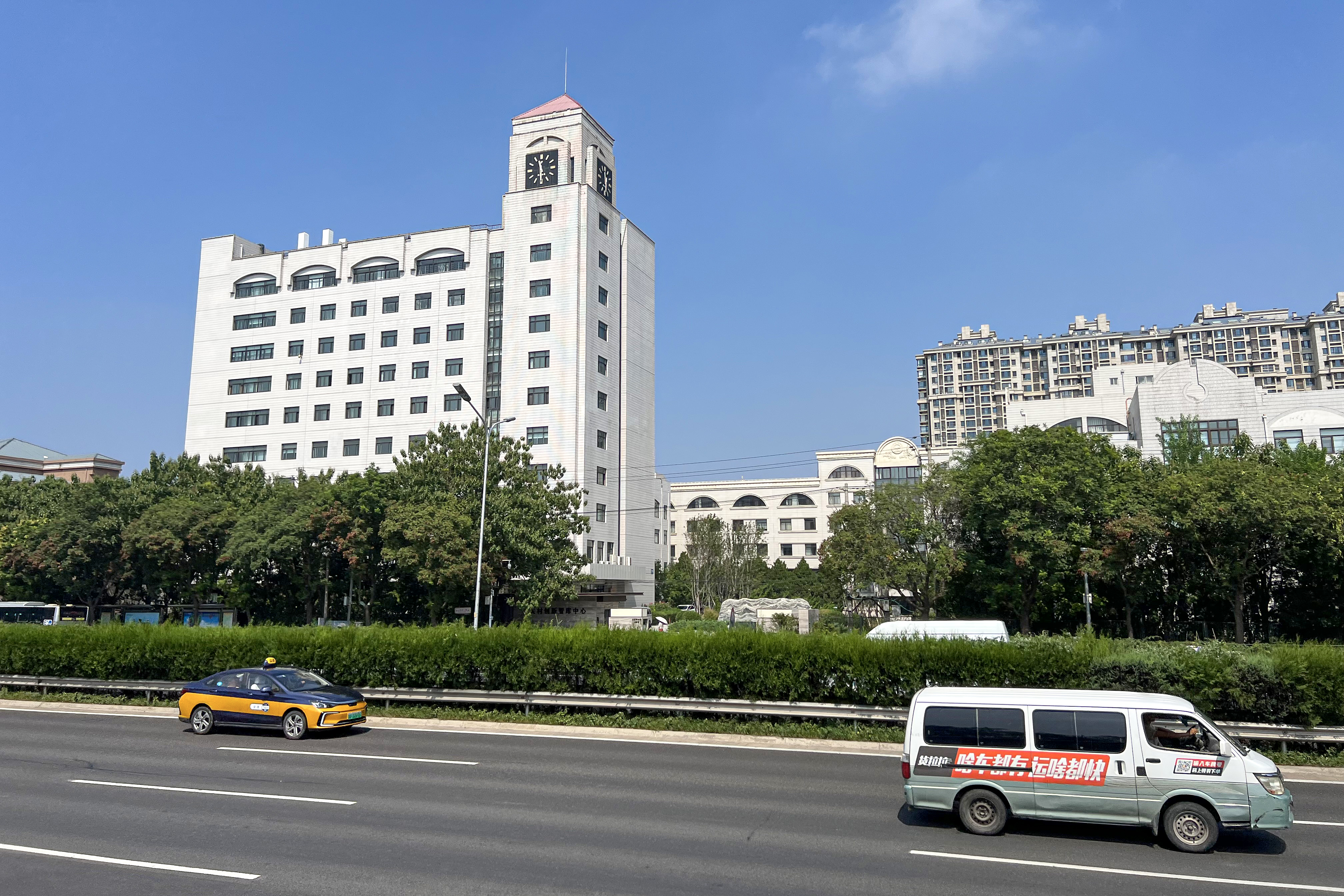
Headquarters

The Chinese Society of Education (CSE, Chinese: 中国教育学会) is the oldest and largest national educational academic organization in China, operating under the Ministry of Education.

== History ==
From March 23 to April 13, 1979, the inaugural national education science planning meeting was convened by the Bureau of the General Assembly, with participation from all delegates. On April 12, the Ministry of Education of the People's Republic of China and the Chinese Academy of Social Sciences jointly organized a National Conference on Education Science Planning, announcing the establishment of the planning framework for June 1979 and January 1980. By December 1980, three enlarged executive meetings had been held in Beijing to summarize the work and amend the constitution.

At the Two Sessions in 2016, Zhu Yongxing, deputy director of the Chinese Society of Education, discussed two areas in the education system in China requiring reform: Improving the quality of education to prevent so many Chinese youth from feeling compelled to study abroad and the lack of education for migrant workers.

== Chairmen (Presidents) ==
- First Session: Dong Chuncai
- Second Session: Zhang Chengxian
- Third: Zhang Chengxian
- Fourth: Zhang Chengxian
- Fifth: Gu Mingyuan
- Sixth: Gu Mingyuan
- Seventh: Zhong Binglin
- Eighth: Zhu Zhiwen
