= Decadent Sound of Faye =

1995 album by Faye Wong

Studio album by Faye Wong
- Released: July 3, 1995
- Recorded: 1995
- Genres: Mandopop; chamber pop
- Length: 47:15
- Label: Cinepoly

Faye Wong chronology
Please Myself (1994)	Decadent Sound of Faye (1995)	One Person Playing Two Roles (1995)

Decadent Sound of Faye
- Chinese: 菲靡靡之音
- Literal meaning: Luxurious Decadent Music
Transcriptions
Standard Mandarin
- Hanyu Pinyin: Fēi mǐmǐ zhī yīn

Decadent Sound of Faye (Chinese: 菲靡靡之音; pinyin: Fēi mǐmǐ zhī yīn), also translated as Faye Beautiful Music, is the third Mandarin studio album by Chinese singer Faye Wong. It was released through Cinepoly Records on July 3, 1995. It consists entirely of rearranged versions of songs originally released by Teresa Teng.

As of December 1, 1995, Xin Di Weekly reported that Wong's Mandarin album 《Decadent Sound of Faye》（菲靡靡之音） had sold more than 100,000 copies in Hong Kong. This album was also the best-selling album by a female artist in Singapore in 1996.

== Name ==
The word ‘decadent’ is an ironic echo of early PRC condemnation of music such as that of Taiwanese singer Teresa Teng's music as mǐmǐ zhī yue (靡靡之樂). The title of this album is a pun: during the Cultural Revolution, Teng's songs were condemned as "decadent sounds" (靡靡之音) by the Chinese Communist Party. The album title is literally translated as Faye's Decadent Music (菲靡靡之音), but as the character "菲" (fēi, i.e. the name Faye in Chinese) has the same pronunciation as the related character "非" (fēi, "not" in Classical Chinese), the title can also be construed as "Non-Decadent Sounds".

Word play on Faye's name 菲 fēi in Mandarin has also been used on two Cinepoly compilation albums: 菲卖品 Fēi mài pǐn ("Faye sale product", a pun on 非卖品 fēi mài pǐn, "Not-for-sale product") and 菲主打 Fēi zhǔdǎ ("Faye main beat", a pun on 非主打 Fēi zhǔdǎ "not main beat").

== Tribute to Teresa Teng ==
The album consists entirely of cover versions of songs originally released by her idol Teresa Teng, one of the most revered Chinese singers of the 20th century. Teng's music remains extremely popular in Japan, Taiwan, Hong Kong, Southeast Asia and mainland China. A duet was planned for the album, but Teng died before this could be recorded; Wong considered scrapping the project out of respect. However, Faye sang this duet, Li Bai's "清平調" with Teresa posthumously in a memorial celebrating her 60th birthday.

== Reception ==
Professional ratings
Review scores
Source	Rating
Pitchfork	7.9/10

Decadent Sounds sold quite well despite initial negative criticism. It has come to be recognised as a classic by her fans and is held as an example of imaginative covering by recent critics. Not only did Wong show that she shared Teresa Teng's clear, sweet singing voice, but the arrangements added an unexpected freshness to many of the songs.

In a 2023 review of four reissued Wong albums (Please Myself to Fuzao) by Pitchfork, Michael Hong wrote that "Wong emulates [Teng's] sweetness, but does away with much of the grandeur of Teng's tradition-bound performances; Wong's voice is instead airy, lofty, and lithe" and it "takes a more modernized and Westernized approach. Wong flips weighty arrangements into string-led chamber-pop pieces".

== Track listing ==
Tracks are listed with their original Chinese titles, along with a transcription in pinyin and an unofficial English translation.

1. "雪中蓮" (Xuĕ zhōng lián); Lotus in the Snow
2. "你在我心中" (Nĭ zài wŏ xīn zhōng); You Are in My Heart
3. "但願人長久" (Dàn yuàn rén chángjiŭ); Wishing We Last Forever
4. "君心我心" (Jūn xīn wŏ xīn); His Heart, My Heart
5. "初戀的地方" (Chūliàn de dìfāng); Place of First Love
6. "南海姑娘" (Nánhăi gūniáng); South China Sea Girl
7. "假如我是真的" (Jiărú wŏ shì zhēn de); If I Were for Real
8. "翠湖寒" (Cuì hú hán); Cold Blue-Green Lake
9. "黃昏裡" (Huánghūn lĭ); At Dusk
10. "奈何" (Nàihé); Naihe
11. "一個小心願" (Yī ge xiăo xīnyuàn); One Small Wish
12. "又見炊煙" (Yòu jiàn chuīyān); See the Chimney Smoke Again
13. "原鄉情濃" (Yuán xiāng qíng nóng); Sentiments of a Native Village

Japanese edition bonus track

1. "千言萬語" (Qiānyán-wànyŭ; Live in Hong Kong 1994)

== Charts ==
=== Weekly charts ===
Chart (1995)	Peak position
Hong Kong Albums (IFPI)	2

=== Year-end charts ===
Chart (1995)	Position
Hong Kong Albums (IFPI)	6
