= Separate Ways (Faye Wong song) =

2001 single by Faye Wong

Single by Faye Wong
- B-side: "Eyes on Me"
- Released: July 2001
- Genre: J-pop, Mandopop
- Label: EMI

Faye Wong singles chronology
"Eyes on Me" (1999)	"Separate Ways" (2001)	"Orchid Parade" (2010)

"Separate Ways" is a single by Chinese singer Faye Wong.

The title track was the theme song for the Japanese television serial Love From a Lie (ウソコイ, Usokoi) in which Wong also had a leading role. It was written by Japanese singer-songwriter Hideki Kaji who also released his own recording of it as a single that same year, and then re-recorded it once more for his 2002 album A Long Week-End.

== Track listing ==
1. "Separate Ways"
2. "Separate Ways" (128 Beat Mix)
3. "Eyes on Me"
4. "香奈兒" (Xiāngnàiér)
  Chanel
5. "Separate Ways" (Instrumental)

The title track is one of Faye Wong's few songs recorded in Japanese. It also includes some lines in English.

Track 3, "Eyes on Me", was the theme music for the video game Final Fantasy VIII.

Track 4 had been released the previous year on Wong's album Fable.
