= Faye Wong (2001 album) =

Studio album by Faye Wong

Studio album by Faye Wong
- Released: 11 October 2001
- Recorded: 2001
- Genre: Mandopop
- Length: 44:58
- Label: EMI

Faye Wong chronology
Fable (2000)	Faye Wong (2001)	To Love (2003)

Faye Wong (Chinese: 王菲) is the ninth Mandarin studio album (eighteenth overall) by Chinese recording artist Faye Wong, released through EMI on 11 October 2001. It is her second self-titled Mandarin record following Faye Wong (1997). Wong worked with new partners on this album, including Singaporean singer-songwriter Tanya Chua and Taiwanese rocker Wu Bai.

According to Sanlian Life Weekly, as of December 2001, the album had sold over 500,000 copies in Hong Kong and Taiwan.

== Songs ==
The songs Faye Wong are a mixture of pop and rock numbers, including pop rock, techno and electro genres. It included 11 tracks in Mandarin Chinese and five in Cantonese. The latter provided Wong's most significant release of new Cantonese songs since Toy in 1997.

== Critical reception ==
Reflecting the varied contributors to the album, reviewers found it a mixed bag. A retrospective review in Singapore's The Straits Times mentioned that Wu Bai's techno-rock track "Two Persons' Bible" was "more Wu than Wong". The Cantonese section was considered "more heartening".

== Use in other media ==
"Idiot" was the theme song to Feng Xiaogang's 2001 movie Big Shot's Funeral (大腕) with Donald Sutherland.

== Track listing ==
Faye Wong – Standard edition
No.	Title	Unofficial translation	Length
1.	"Guāng Zhī Yì 光之翼"	"Wings of Light"	3:21
2.	"Děngděng 等等"	"Wait a Moment"	3:28
3.	"Dǎcuòle 打錯了"	"Wrong Number"	3:12
4.	"Yǒushí Àiqíng Tú Yǒu Xū Míng 有時愛情徒有虛名"	"Sometimes Love has a False Reputation"	4:03
5.	"Liú Nián 流年"	"Fleeting Time"	4:37
6.	"Yè Huì 夜會"	"Nocturnal Date"	4:17
7.	"Liúlàng De Hóng Wǔ Xié 流浪的紅舞鞋"	"The Wanderer's Red Dancing Shoes"	4:16
8.	"Báichī 白癡"	"Idiot"	4:32
9.	"Liǎnggèrén De Shèngjīng (Note: The title of "Two Persons' Bible" was inspired by One Man's Bible, a novel by Nobel Laureate Gao Xingjian.) 兩個人的聖經"	"Two Persons' Bible"	4:24
10.	"Dānxíngdào 單行道"	"One Way Street"	5:23
11.	"Liúlàng De Hóng Wǔ Xié (Gāngqín Bǎn) 流浪的紅舞鞋 (鋼琴版)"	"The Wanderer's Red Dancing Shoes" (piano version)	3:25
Total length:			44:58

Hong Kong edition bonus disc
No.	Title	Unofficial translation	Length
1.	"Màihwàhn Gei 迷魂記"	"Vertigo/Bewitchment"	4:09
2.	"Sīkmàahng 色盲"	"Colorblind"	3:17
3.	"Bāt Mìhn Fēihàahng 不 眠 飛行"	"Sleepless Flight"	3:11
4.	"Sām Louh 心 路"	"Heart of the Road"	4:02
5.	"Neúihwòhng Dīk Sān Yī 女皇 的 新 衣"	"The Empress' New Clothes"	3:07
Total length:			17:46

Southeast Asia edition bonus tracks
No.	Title	Unofficial translation	Length
12.	"Màihwàhn Gei 迷魂記"	"Vertigo/Bewitchment"	4:09
13.	"Bāt Mìhn Fēihàahng 不眠飛行"	"Sleepless Flight"	3:11
Total length:			7:20

Japan edition and Mainland China edition listing
No.	Title	Unofficial translation	Length
11.	"Màihwàhn Gei 迷魂記"	"Vertigo/Bewitchment"	4:09
12.	"Sīkmàahng 色盲"	"Colorblind"	3:17
13.	"Bāt Mìhn Fēihàahng 不眠飛行"	"Sleepless Flight"	3:11
14.	"Sām Louh 心路"	"Heart of the Road"	4:02
15.	"Neúihwòhng Dīk Sān Yī 女皇的新衣"	"The Empress' New Clothes"	3:07
16.	"Liúlàng De Hóng Wǔ Xié (Gāngqín Bǎn) 流浪的紅舞鞋 (鋼琴版)"	"The Wanderer's Red Dancing Shoes" (piano version)	3:25
Total length:			21:11

Japanese bonus 3" CD
No.	Title	Length
1.	"Separate Ways" (Original Version)	4:36
2.	"Separate Ways" (Almighty Mix)	7:52
Total length:		12:28

Notes

Tracks 1–10 & 16 are in Mandarin Chinese, and 11–15 in Cantonese. Tracks 14 and 15 are Cantonese versions of tracks 4 and 3 respectively.

== Release history ==
Region	Release date	Label	Format(s)
Japan	11 October 2001	Toshiba EMI	CD
Hong Kong	18 October 2001	EMI	2CD
Taiwan	18 October 2001	EMI	CD
Singapore	18 October 2001	EMI Singapore	CD
Malaysia	18 October 2001	EMI Malaysia	Cassette
China	18 October 2001	Shanghai Audio & Video Publishing House	CD
China	18 October 2001	Shanghai Audio & Video Publishing House	Cassette
China	2002	Shanghai Audio & Video Publishing House	CD (Special Edition)
