= One Person Playing Two Roles =

Yat yan fan sik leung gok

EP by Faye Wong
- Released: September 1995
- Genre: Cantopop
- Label: Cinepoly

Faye Wong chronology
Decadent Sound of Faye (1995)	Yat yan fan sik leung gok (1995)	Di-Dar (1995)

Yat yan fan sik leung gok (Chinese: 一人分飾兩角; Cantonese Yale: Yat yan fan sik leung gok; lit. 'One Person', 'Playing Two Roles') is a 1995 EP recorded by Chinese Cantopop singer Faye Wong when she was based in Hong Kong.

The title track, by the band AMK with lyrics by Wyman Wong, was the only new song. The others had all been included in Faye Wong's previous albums.

== Track listing ==
No.	Title	Writer(s)	Unofficial translation	Length
1.	"Yat Yun Fun Sik Leung Gok" (一人分飾兩角)	AMK/Wyman Wong	"One Person Playing Two Roles"
2.	"Ngoi Yu Toong Dik Been Yuen" (愛與痛的邊緣)		"Brink of Love and Pain"
3.	"Wo Yuan Yi" (我願意 (弦樂版))		"I'm Willing" (string version)
4.	"Jee Gei Jee Bei" (知己知彼)	Cocteau Twins	Know Oneself And Each Other
5.	"Tian Kong" (天空)		"Sky"
6.	"Yat Yun Fun Sik Leung Gok" (一人分飾兩角)		"One Person Playing Two Roles" (karaoke version)

== Cover versions ==
Emmy the Great included a cover version of the title track in her 2011 album Virtue as a bonus track for the Asian version. Emmy the Great, who was born in Hong Kong, considers Faye Wong as one of her favorite Cantopop singers.
