= Naomi Chiaki =

Japanese singer and actress (born 1947)

- Born: Mieko Segawa (瀬川 三恵子, Segawa Mieko); September 17, 1947 (age 79)
- Origin: Itabashi, Tokyo, Japan
- Genres: Kayōkyoku, pop, enka, contemporary folk, rock, jazz fusion
- Occupations: Singer, actress
- Years active: 1969–1992
- Labels: Nippon Columbia; CBS Sony; Victor/Invitation; Teichiku

Naomi Chiaki (ちあき なおみ, Chiaki Naomi; born September 17, 1947) is a Japanese singer and actress who worked from the late 1960s to the early 1990s.

Chiaki made her debut as a singer in 1969, and released her breakthrough single "Yottsu no Onegai" (四つのお願い, [ja]) in the following year. "Kassai" (喝采, [ja]), a song which has been commonly considered her signature song was released in 1972 and gained success, and finally won the 14th Japan Record Award. "Kassai" sold over one million copies by February 1973, and was awarded a gold disc.

After marrying the actor Eiji Go in 1978, Chiaki continued her career intermittently until circa 1992. This included contributions to the soundtrack for Elephant Story (featuring the songs "Lullaby of the Land of the Wind" and "African Night"). However, she disappeared from the Japanese entertainment industry after her spouse died of lung cancer.

In 2024 on her 55th debut anniversary, all of her 425 songs have become available on streaming and for digital download.

== Discography ==
=== Albums ===
==== Studio albums ====
Title	Album details	Peak chart positions
Title	Album details	JP
Yottsu no Onegai; Anata ni Yobikakeru Chiaki Naomi (四つのお願い あなたに呼びかけるちあきなおみ)	Released: July 10, 1970; Label: Nippon Columbia; Formats: LP, digital download, streaming	-
Ai no Tabiji wo; Naomi Chiaki Sings Enka and Blues (愛の旅路を ちあきなおみ 演歌ブルースを歌う)	Released: November 25, 1970; Label: Nippon Columbia; Formats: LP, digital download, streaming	-
Ai wa Kizutsuki Yasuku; Naomi Chiaki Sings Hit Pops (愛は傷つきやすく ちあきなおみ ヒット・ポップスを歌う)	Released: December 10, 1970; Label: Nippon Columbia; Formats: LP, digital download, streaming	-
Koi to Namida to Blues (恋と涙とブルース, Koi to Namida to Brūsu)	Released: June 25, 1972; Label: Nippon Columbia; Formats: LP, digital download, streaming	-
Mou Hitori no Watashi (もう一人の私)	Released: December 10, 1972; Label: Nippon Columbia; Formats: LP, digital download, streaming	-
Waltz (円舞曲, Warutsu)	Released: May 25, 1974; Label: Nippon Columbia; Formats: LP, digital download, streaming	-
Kanashimi Moyou (かなしみ模様)	Released: November 25, 1974; Label: Nippon Columbia; Formats: LP, digital download, streaming	-
Enka Jouwa (演歌情話)	Released: July 25, 1975; Label: Nippon Columbia; Formats: LP, digital download, streaming	-
Sengo no Hikari to Kage; Chiaki Naomi, Gareki no Naka kara (戦後の光と影～ちあきなおみ、瓦礫の中から)	Released: November 25, 1975; Label: Nippon Columbia; Formats: LP, digital download, streaming	-
Haru wa Yuku (春は逝く)	Released: April 25, 1976; Label: Nippon Columbia; Formats: LP, digital download, streaming	-
Sotto Oyasumi (そっとおやすみ)	Released:June 25, 1976; Label: Nippon Columbia; Formats: LP, digital download, streaming	-
Rouge (ルージュ, Rūju)	Released: July 25, 1977; Label: Nippon Columbia; Formats: LP, digital download, streaming	-
Amagumo (あまぐも)	Released: January 25, 1978; Label: Nippon Columbia; Formats: LP, digital download, streaming	-
Sorezore no Table (それぞれのテーブル, Sorezore no Tēburu)	Released: October 21, 1981; Label: JVCKenwood Victor; Formats: LP, digital download, streaming	-
Three Hundreds Club	Released: July 21, 1982; Label: JVCKenwood Victor; Formats: LP, digital download, streaming	-
Time (待夢, Taimu)	Released: September 5, 1983; Label: JVCKenwood Victor; Formats: LP, digital download, streaming	-
Minato ga Mieru Oka (港が見える丘) (aka Hoshikage no Komichi (星影の小径))	Released: February 5, 1985; Label: JVCKenwood Victor; Formats: LP, digital download, streaming	-
Tsutawarimasuka (伝わりますか)	Released: March 1, 1988; Label: Teichiku; Formats: LP, CD, digital download, streaming	-
Otoko no Kyoushū (男の郷愁)	Released: March 21, 1989; Label: Teichiku; Formats: LP, CD, digital download, streaming	-
On'na no Shinjou (女の心情)	Released: June 21, 1989; Label: Teichiku; Formats: LP, CD, digital download, streaming	-
Kassai/Akatombo; Yoshida Oh Sanpun Dorama (喝采・紅とんぼ 吉田旺参分劇)	Released: November 21, 1989; Label: Teichiku; Formats: LP, CD, digital download, streaming	-
Kagerou; Iro wa Nioedo (かげろふ ～色は匂へど～)	Released: November 21, 1990; Label: Teichiku; Formats: CD, digital download, streaming	-
Standard Numbers (すたんだーど・なんばー, Standādo Nanbā)	Released: July 21, 1991; Label: Teichiku; Formats: CD, digital download, streaming	-
Hyakka Ryouran (百花繚乱)	Released: October 23, 1991; Label: Teichiku; Formats: CD, digital download, streaming	-

=== Singles ===
Year	Single	Chart positions
Year	Single	JP
1969	"Ame ni Nureta Bojō" (雨に濡れた慕情)	23
1969	"Asa ga Kuru Mae ni" (朝がくるまえに)	18
1970	"Yottsu no Onegai" (四つのお願い)	4
1970	"X+Y=LOVE"	5
1970	"Wakareta Ato de" (別れたあとで)	13
1971	"Muda na Teikō wa Yamemashō" (無駄な抵抗はやめましょう)	30
1971	"Watashi to Iu Onna" ((私という女))	24
1971	"Shinobiau Koi" (しのび逢う恋)	48
1971	"Kyō de Owatte" (今日で終って)	76
1972	"Koishita Onna" (恋した女)	95
1972	"Kinjirareta Koi no Shima" (禁じられた恋の島)	66
1972	"Kassai" (喝采)	2
1973	"Gekijō" ((劇場))	36
1973	"Yakan Hikō" (夜間飛行)	15
1974	"Waltz" (円舞曲 Warutsu)	29
1974	"Kanashimi Moyō" (かなしみ模様)	69
1975	"Hanafubuki" (花吹雪)	82
1975	"Renbo Yakyoku" (恋慕夜曲)	88
1975	"Sadamegawa" (さだめ川)	33
1976	"Sakabagawa" (酒場川)	81
1977	"Rouge" (ルージュ Ruju)	–
1982	"Yagiri no Watashi" (矢切の渡し)	57
1988	"Yakusha" (役者)	56
1988	"Akatombo" (紅とんぼ)	46
2000	"Kamome no Machi" / "Tasogare no Begin" (かもめの街/黄昏のビギン Tasogare no Bigin)	86
2001	"Saigetsugawa" (歳月川)	100

== Kōhaku Uta Gassen Appearances ==
Year	#	Song	No.	VS	Remarks
1970 (Showa 45)/21st	1	Yotsu No Onegai (四つのお願い)	17/24	Duke Aces	
1971 (Showa 46)/22nd	2	Watashi To Iuonna (私という女)	4/25	Kyu Sakamoto	
1972 (Showa 47)/23rd	3	Kassai (喝采)	20/23	Kenji Sawada	
1973 (Showa 48)/24th	4	Yakan Hikou (夜間飛行)	21/23	Hiroshi Itsuki	
1974 (Showa 49)/25th	5	Kanashimi Moyou (かなしみ模様)	24/25	Haruo Minami	Second Finale
1975 (Showa 50)/26th	6	Sadamegawa (さだめ川)	23/24	Akira Fuse	Second Finale (2)
1976 (Showa 51)/27th	7	Sakabakawa (酒場川)	23/24	Akira Fuse (2)	Second Finale (3)
1977 (Showa 52)/28th	8	Yorue Isoguhito (夜へ急ぐ人)	21/24	Akira Fuse (3)	
1988 (Showa 63)/39th	9	Akatonbo (紅とんぼ)	18/21	Shinichi Mori	Returned after 12 years
