= AMK (band) =

- Years active: 1989-1996
- Musical career
- Origin: Hong Kong
- Genres: Indie Cantorock
- Members: Kwan King Chung, Anson Mak, Hui Wai Sum, Ling Ling

AMK, or Adam Met Karl, was a Hong Kong–based independent band from 1989 to 1996. The name of the band is derived from the first names of the economists Adam Smith and Karl Marx. One of the pioneers of Cantonese indie pop, their songs featured upbeat melodies and fast rhythms with lyrics inspired by political issues and ordinary city life in Hong Kong that are often presented in a humorous and satirical way.

In 2006, a compilation album, In the name of AMK, was released by Harbour Records as a tribute to the band. Their songs were performed by various independent acts such as False Alarm, Fruitpunch and 22 Cats.

One of their most notable achievements was their song "One Person Playing Two Roles" (一人分飾兩角) with lyrics by Wyman Wong, which was recorded by Faye Wong in 1995 and used as the theme music for a radio soap opera.
