= Dong Chuncai =

Chinese politician

Dong Chuncai (1905- May 22, 1990, Chinese: 董纯才), originally from Daye County, Hubei Province, was an educator in the People's Republic of China, a pioneer in the popularization of science, and one of the earliest theorists advocating for the dissemination of the scientific spirit in China.

== Biography ==
Dong Chuncai was born on March 5, 1905, into a patriotic intellectual family in Daocheng Town, Daye County, Hubei Province, today known as Huangshi City. In 1915, Dong Chuncai attended Wuchang Church School, Sanyitang Primary School, and Sanyitang Middle School. During the May Fourth Movement, he actively engaged in student marches, demonstrations, and petitions in Wuhan, and was inspired by patriotism. Subsequently, he withdrew from school due to a movement opposing slavery education in religious institutions. In 1920, he attended Pudong Middle School (Chinese: 上海浦东中学) in Shanghai, opposing Japan's acquisition of Shandong. In early 1925, he was enrolled in the education department of Nanfang University. That year, he was assigned to the Department of Education at National University (Chinese: 国民大学). From 1925 to 1927, he pursued his studies at the Department of Education at Kwang Hua University. In February 1928, his father was unemployed, resulting in the family's loss of income, prompting their relocation back to Wuchang. In that month, Dong Chuncai was enrolled as a part-time student at the Nanjing Xiaozhuang Rural Teacher Training Experimental School (Chinese: 南京晓庄乡村师范试验学校). In that year, he was directed to establish a biology laboratory at Xiaozhuang School under the supervision of Bing Zhi and Yao Wencai. In the spring of 1929, he was appointed to Xianghu Normal School in Zhejiang Province to serve as a life instructor and teach biology. In the autumn, he resumed his position as a lecturer at Xiaozhuang School and continued to oversee the Biology Research Laboratory.

In February 1930, Dong Chuncai engaged in the efforts orchestrated by the Chinese Communist Party (CCP) underground organization at Xiaozhuang School to support the strike of workers at the British-operated Hutchison Egg Factory in Nanjing. On April 5, he participated in the anti-imperialist demonstration organized by the CCP Nanjing Committee, and on April 12, he actively contributed to the movement led by the CCP underground organization to safeguard the school. In June, the Kuomintang government mandated the closure of Xiaozhuang School. On September 3, 1937, Dong Chuncai departed from Shanghai to Yan'an, where he was appointed to the Department of Education of the Shaanxi-Gansu-Ningxia Border Region Government (Chinese: 陕甘宁边区政府) in early October. On November 14, he was elected as a standing member of the Shaanxi-Gansu-Ningxia Border Region Cultural Association and initiated the formation of the Yan'an National Defense Science Society. In January 1938, he held the position of deputy head and subsequently head of the Editorial and Examination Section within the Department of Education of the Shaanxi-Gansu-Ningxia Border Region Government, and he served as the chief editor of the Chinese textbooks for the resistance elementary school in the same region. In that year, Dong Chuncai became a member of the CCP.

In June 1939, Dong Chuncai was designated vice principal of the Shaanxi-Gansu-Ningxia Border Region Teachers' Training School. In October 1940, he was reassigned to the Central Publicity Department as deputy head of the National Education Section, overseeing the revision of elementary school textbooks. By early 1943, he was appointed head of the National Education Section at the CCP Northwestern Bureau. In early November 1945, he assumed the role of secretary of the general party branch of the fifth cadre brigade en route to the Northeast, leading a contingent of over 200 individuals from Yan'an, traversing the Yellow River by boat prior to its freezing, passing through the liberated region of Jinsui, and advancing to the Northeast.

In early 1946, he directed the fifth cadre brigade to operate in the Northeast, specifically in Zhangjiakou; in June, he led the brigade to Harbin and reported to the CCP Northeast Bureau; in early July, he joined the West Manchuria Reform Work Group and engaged in land reform efforts in the rural areas of Zhaosu; by mid-September, he returned to Harbin. At the year's conclusion, he traveled to Baichengzi in western Liaoning Province to examine the execution of the principles established at the inaugural education conference at the grassroots-level. On November 2, following the conclusion of the Liaoshen campaign, the northeastern governmental and party institutions relocated from Harbin to Shenyang. In May 1949, he supervised over the establishment of the Northeastern Experimental School.

In March 1951, he oversaw the establishment of the Northeast Institute of Educational Administration and simultaneously held the position of president. In late March 1953, he officially accepted the position of Vice Minister of the Central Ministry of Education, primarily overseeing the People's Education Publishing House in the preparation of basic and secondary school textbooks. In 1954, as a delegate to the inaugural National People's Congress, he was appointed Vice Minister of the Central Ministry of Education. On September 4, 1955, the foundation of the Central Institute of Educational Administration was presided over in Beijing. On September 4, 1955, he oversaw the inauguration of the Central Institute of Education and Administration in Beijing and served as its president. On January 28, 1956, the State Council designated him as a member of the Central Working Committee for the Advancement of Standard Chinese. On March 15, the National Association for the Eradication of Illiteracy was founded, and he assumed the role of vice-president. In September, the CCP convened its Eighth National Congress, at which he was chosen as a delegate. In this year, he was elected to the Fourth Central Committee of the China Association for Promoting Democracy. In February 1958, the Ministry of Education and the Ministry of Higher Education were amalgamated to establish the Ministry of Education, with Dong Chuncai serving as vice minister. In September, he was elected as a member of the China Association for Science and Technology. From October 25 to November 4, 1959, he chaired the conference on rural literacy initiatives and informal education. On November 11, 1959, he assumed leadership of the newly formed Literacy Office inside the Ministry of Education.

In 1966, at the onset of the Cultural Revolution, he was designated a “counter-revolutionary revisionist” and “Chinese Kelov”, enduring criticism and persecution from rebels and Red Guards within the organization; on June 30, 1977, he returned to his role as an adviser to the Ministry of Education. On June 14, 1978, the Ministry of Education's office meeting provisionally approved the "Report on the Request for Rebuilding the Central Institute of Educational Sciences," presented by Dong Chuncai. It was resolved to establish the Preparatory Office of the Central Institute of Educational Sciences, led by a trio comprising Dong Chuncai, Liu Songtao, and Gong Junmin. In July, the State Council sanctioned the restoration of the Central Institute for Educational Sciences, following the recommendations of the institute's director and the chair of its academic committee. This year, he joined the Fifth National Committee of the Chinese People's Political Consultative Conference (CPPCC) as deputy director of the Proposal Committee and leader of the Education Group. Four years later, he joined the Sixth National Committee of the CPPCC and assumed leadership of the Education Group. He served as Deputy Minister of Education from April 9, 1979, till leaving in April 1982. In 1979, he became president of the newly formed Chinese Society of Education.

He died on May 22, 1990.
