= Toy and Help Yourself =

EPs by Faye Wong

Toy and Help Yourself are two Cantonese extended plays (EPs) by Chinese recording artist Faye Wong when she was based in Hong Kong. In 1996, the last year of her recording contract with Cinepoly Records, Wong recorded ten original songs in Cantonese, all with lyrics by Lin Xi, but composed by others such as Wong Ka Keung, Adrian Chan, and Chan Xiao Xia.

According to The Straits Times on 28 February 1997, the first 100,000 copies of Wong's Cantonese EP Toys had sold out shortly after its release, prompting the record company to reprint another 100,000 copies, bringing the total shipment to 200,000 copies.

These songs were supposed to be released as an album in 1996 or 1997. However, Cinepoly decided to release the ten tracks separately on four occasions. Cinepoly later released eight of these songs in the two EPs entitled Toy and Help Yourself. The other two songs were included in later compilations.

== Toy ==
Toy (玩具)

EP by Faye Wong
- Released: February 20, 1997
- Genre: Cantopop
- Length: 19:06
- Label: Cinepoly

Faye Wong chronology
Fuzao (1996)	Toy (玩具) (1997)	Help Yourself (1997)

Toy (Chinese: 玩具; Jyutping: wun^{6} geoi^{6}) was released in February 1997, during Faye Wong's parental leave where she gave birth to her first child. The EP's cover photo depicts Wong in her home in Beijing, China, having moved back there after several successful years based in Hong Kong.

The five tracks on Toy would be Wong's most significant release of new Cantonese songs until her self-titled album in 2001.

Track listing
No.	Title	Length
1.	"暗湧" (Ngaam Yoong; Undercurrent)	4:21
2.	"約定" (Yerk Ding; Date/Rendezvous)	4:25
3.	"敷衍" (Fu Yeen)	3:00
4.	"玩具" (Woon Gui; Toy)	4:20
5.	"我信" (Ngor Seun; I Believe)	3:00
Total length:		19:06

=== Certifications ===
Region	Certification	Certified units/sales
Hong Kong (IFPI Hong Kong)	Platinum	20,000^{*}
^{*} Sales figures based on certification alone.

== Help Yourself ==
Help Yourself (自便)

EP by Faye Wong
- Released: May 29, 1997
- Genre: Cantopop
- Length: 23:48
- Label: Cinepoly

Faye Wong chronology
Toy (1997)	Help Yourself (自便) (1997)	Faye Wong (1997)

Help Yourself (Chinese: 自便; Jyutping: zi^{6} bin^{6}) followed in May 1997. Although this EP (like Toy) contained new songs, including the hit ballad "On Time" (守時), and was welcomed by fans, it received indifferent critical responses, particularly for the three remixes of songs from earlier albums. The album cover was a photograph of Faye Wong taken several years previously.

Track listing
No.	Title	Length
1.	"守時" (Sau See; Punctuality)	4:12
2.	"守護天使" (Sau Wu Teen See; Guardian Angel)	3:38
3.	"自便" (Jee Been; Help Yourself)	4:56
4.	"Di-Dar"	3:15
5.	"誓言" (Shi Yan)	3:55
6.	"夢遊" (Moong Yau; Sleepwalk (Universal Mix))	3:50
Total length:		23:48

=== Other songs ===
Cinepoly's first releases of their remaining original recordings by Faye Wong were as follows:

- "不得了" (Baat dak liu) -

'Unbelievable', on the 1997 compilation Not for Sale (菲賣品)

- "心驚膽戰" (Saam ging daam jin)

'Scary', on the 2002 compilation Faye Best

== Be Perfunctory ==
Be Perfunctory (敷衍)

Studio album by Faye Wong
- Released: November 22, 2015
- Recorded: 1996
- Genre: Cantopop
- Length: 42:03
- Label: Chaotic Silence

Faye Wong chronology
To Love (2003)	Be Perfunctory (敷衍) (2015)

Be Perfunctory is the last Cantonese album by Chinese singer Faye Wong. In 2015, a fan of Faye Wong purchased the Hong Kong publishing rights from Cinepoly (now under Universal Music Group) and started a company called Chaotic Silence in order to issue the ten tracks together in one album.

Track listing
No.	Title	Length
1.	"敷衍" (Fuhin)	4:20
2.	"暗涌" (Amjung)	4:21
3.	"心驚膽戰" (Samging daamzin)	4:18
4.	"守護天使" (Sauwu tinsi)	3:43
5.	"守時" (Sausi)	4:16
6.	"不得了" (Bat dak liu)	3:52
7.	"玩具" (Wun geoi)	3:00
8.	"我信" (Ngo seon)	4:48
9.	"自便" (Zi bin)	5:00
10.	"約定" (Joek ding)	4:25
Total length:		42:03

=== Charts ===
Chart performance for Be Perfunctory
Chart (2026)	Peak position
Japanese Albums (Oricon)	49
