= Wang Fei (footballer, born 1993) =

Chinese footballer

Wang Fei 王飞
Personal information
- Date of birth: 8 January 1993 (age 33)
- Place of birth: Henan, China
- Height: 1.68 m (5 ft 6 in)
- Positions: Right-back; right winger

Team information
- Current team: Henan Jianye
- Number: 23

Senior career*
Years	Team	Apps	(Gls)
2011–	Henan Jianye	40	(0)
- * Club domestic league appearances and goals as of 31 December 2022

Wang Fei (Chinese: 王飞; born 8 January 1993) is a Chinese footballer who currently plays for Chinese Super League side Henan Jianye.

== Club career ==
Wang Fei started his professional football career in 2011 when he was promoted to Henan Jianye's first squad. On 15 April 2016, he made his debut for Henan Jianye in the 2016 Chinese Super League against Guangzhou Evergrande.

== Career statistics ==
Statistics accurate as of match played 31 December 2022.

Club	Season	League			National Cup		Continental		Other		Total	
Club	Season	Division	Apps	Goals	Apps	Goals	Apps	Goals	Apps	Goals	Apps	Goals
Henan Jianye	2011	Chinese Super League	0	0	0	0	-		-		0	0
Henan Jianye	2012	Chinese Super League	0	0	0	0	-		-		0	0
Henan Jianye	2013	China League One	0	0	0	0	-		-		0	0
Henan Jianye	2014	Chinese Super League	0	0	0	0	-		-		0	0
Henan Jianye	2015	Chinese Super League	0	0	0	0	-		-		0	0
Henan Jianye	2016	Chinese Super League	16	0	4	0	-		-		20	0
Henan Jianye	2017	Chinese Super League	6	0	1	0	-		-		7	0
Henan Jianye	2018	Chinese Super League	15	0	1	0	-		-		16	0
Henan Jianye	2019	Chinese Super League	3	0	1	0	-		-		4	0
Henan Jianye	Total		40	0	7	0	0	0	0	0	47	0
Career total			40	0	7	0	0	0	0	0	47	0
