= You're the Only One (album) =

Studio album by Faye Wong
- Released: December 1990
- Genre: Cantopop
- Label: Cinepoly

Faye Wong chronology
Everything (1990)	You're the Only One (1990)	Coming Home (1992)

You're the Only One is the third Cantonese studio album recorded by Chinese singer Faye Wong, under the stage name Shirley Wong (王靖雯). It was released in December 1990 through Cinepoly.

== Track listing ==
1. 美麗的震盪 (Mei Lai Dik Zan Dong) - Beautiful Vibration
2. 又繼續等 (Jau Gai Zuk Dang) - Still Waiting
3. 然後某天 (Jin Hau Mau Tin) - And Then one Day
4. 悶人咖啡 (Mun Jan Gaa Fe) - Boring Coffee
5. 無原因 (Mou Jyun Jan) - No Reason
6. 多得他 (Do Dak Taa) - Because Of Him (ATV Version: Your Intima-Norman Cheung)
7. 只有你 (Zi Jau Nei) - Only You
8. 靜夜的單簧管 (Zing Je Dik Daan Wong Gun) - Clarinet In A Quiet Night
9. 明年今夜 (Ming Nin Gam Je) - Next Year Tonight
10. 不裝飾 ( Bat Zong Sik) - No Decorations
