= Ye Yonglie =

Chinese science fiction writer and biographer (1940–2020)

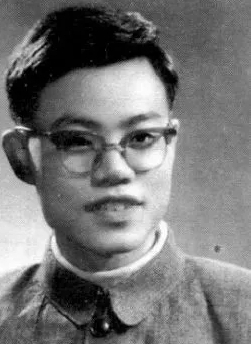
Ye Yonglie in 1963

Ye Yonglie (Chinese: 叶永烈; pinyin: Yè Yǒngliè, 30 August 1940 – 15 May 2020) was a Chinese writer of science fiction and biographies. A few of his stories have been translated into English in The Road to Science Fiction series and elsewhere. During the Anti-Spiritual Pollution Campaign his works were attacked and a story he wrote in 1985 was suppressed for suggesting AIDS had entered the country. As a biographer he wrote on early figures in the People's Republic of China. He also visited North Korea, and wrote a book The Real DPRK (真实的朝鲜) which was banned in that country and China.

Ye wrote a short story named Ba Jin's Dream, which imagines an effort to develop Ba Jin's proposal for a museum of the Cultural Revolution. In the fictional piece, Ye portrays himself as a secretary of the Shanghai Museum Society which establishes a committee to plan the museum. After a Kafkaesque effort to obtain the necessary government approvals, the short story ends with the committee laughing bitterly over its failed dream.

The protagonist of Ye's science fiction classic, Little Smarty Travels to the Future (Xiao Lington manyou weilai 小灵通漫游未来) inspired the name choice of Xiaolingtong cell phones, which were ubiquitous in China's early mobile phone culture.
