= No Regrets (Faye Wong album) =

Studio album by Faye Wong
- Released: 5 February 1993
- Recorded: 1992–1993
- Genre: Pop
- Length: 46:03
- Language: Cantonese Mandarin
- Label: Cinepoly

Faye Wong chronology
Coming Home (1992)	No Regrets (1993)	100,000 Whys (1993)

No Regrets
- Chinese: 執迷不悔
Transcriptions
Standard Mandarin
- Hanyu Pinyin: zhímí bù huǐ
Yue: Cantonese
- Yale Romanization: Jap mai bat fui
- Jyutping: zap^{1} mai^{4} bat^{1} fui^{3}

No Regrets (Chinese: 執迷不悔), also translated as Stubborn and Regretless and Never Deplore, is the fifth Cantonese studio album recorded by Chinese singer Faye Wong. It was released on 5 February 1993, under Cinepoly. The title track was released in both Cantonese and Mandarin. According to The Straits Times on 8 October 1993, Unregrettably Obsessive sold 300,000 copies in Hong Kong.

== Background and development ==
By the time of the album's release, Wong was already established a substantial fanbase in Hong Kong. She wrote the Mandarin lyrics for the ballad "No Regrets", released as a hit single. The similarly titled album was released in February 1993 and became an instant best-seller.

== Composition ==
Although the songs were mostly soft contemporary arrangements, a popular style in Hong Kong, it also had a few dance songs and two versions of the title track: Wong's Mandarin song, and the other with Cantonese lyrics by Chen Shao Qi (the Mandarin version is by far the more popular one).

== Track listing ==
No Regrets track listing
No.	Title	Length
1.	"Faye's Rouge" (紅粉菲菲; Hung Fan Fei Fei)	4:53
2.	"No Regrets (Mandarin version)" (執迷不悔; Zhi Mi Bu Hui)	4:27
3.	"Charming Eyes" (可愛眼睛; Ho Oi Ngaan Zing)	4:51
4.	"Monsoon" (季候風; Gwai Hau Fung)	4:36
5.	"No More Games" (不再兒嬉; Bat Zoi Ji Hei)	6:01
6.	"I Will Always Cherish You" (我永遠珍惜你我; Ngo Wing Jyun Zan Sik Nei Ngo)	3:44
7.	"Rival" (情敵; Cing Dik)	4:47
8.	"We'll Begin Tomorrow" (從明日開始; Cung Ming Jat Hoi Ci)	3:52
9.	"Half-Boozed Night" (夜半醉; Je Bun Zeo)	4:19
10.	"No Regrets" (執迷不悔; Zap Mai Bat Fui)	4:28
Total length:		45:58
