= Sky (Faye Wong album) =

Tian Kong (Sky)

Studio album by Faye Wong
- Released: 10 November 1994
- Recorded: 1994
- Genre: Pop
- Length: 46:59
- Language: Mandarin; Cantonese
- Label: Cinepoly (Hong Kong); Sony Music Entertainment (Singapore)

Faye Wong chronology
Random Thoughts (1994)	Tian Kong (Sky) (1994)	Please Myself (1994)

Sky (Chinese: 天空; pinyin: Tiān kōng), is the second Mandarin studio album (ninth overall) recorded by Chinese singer Faye Wong. It was released on 10 November 1994 under Cinepoly Records.

== Songs ==
"Elude" is a Mandarin version of Wong's Cantonese song "Dream Person", which was included on Random Thoughts and featured in Chungking Express. The song is a cover of The Cranberries' "Dreams". Both versions are still played frequently in Chinese media.

== Use in other media ==
"Angel" was the ending theme music for Mermaid Got Married and was also featured in an episode of Princess Angel.

== Track listing ==
Sky – Standard edition
No.	Title	Unofficial translation	Length
1.	"天空" (Tiānkōng)	"Sky"	4:24
2.	"棋子" (Qízǐ)	"Chesspiece" or "Pawn"	4:51
3.	"天使" (Tiānshǐ)	"Angel"	4:27
4.	"影子" (Yǐngzi)	"Shadow"	4:58
5.	"天空 (Unplugged)" (Tiānkōng)	"Sky (Unplugged)"	3:41
6.	"眷戀" (Juànliàn)	"Devotion"	4:03
7.	"不變" (Bù Biàn)	"Amaranthine"	4:49
8.	"矜持" (Jīnchí)	"Reservedness"	4:42
9.	"掙脫" (Zhēngtuō)	"Elude"	4:32
10.	"誓言" (Shìyán)	"Pledge"	4:23
Total length:			44:50

== Charts ==
=== Weekly charts ===
Chart (1994)	Peak position
Hong Kong Albums (IFPI)	2

=== Year-end charts ===
Chart (1994)	Position
Taiwanese Albums	1

== Sales ==
Region	Certification	Certified units/sales
Taiwan	—	1,000,000

== Release history ==
Region	Date	Format(s)	Label
Taiwan	10 November 1994	CD; cassette	Decca Records Taiwan
Japan	25 May 1995	CD; cassette	Cinepoly
Singapore	27 December 2012	CD; tape; digital download	Sony Music Entertainment
