= Random Thoughts (Faye Wong album) =

Random Thoughts 胡思亂想

Studio album by Faye Wong
- Released: 29 June 1994
- Recorded: 1994
- Genres: Alternative rock; Cantopop
- Length: 43:51
- Label: Cinepoly

Faye Wong chronology
Mystery (1994)	Random Thoughts 胡思亂想 (1994)	Sky (1994)

Random Thoughts (Chinese: 胡思亂想), alternatively Thinking Here and There or Wondering Music, is the seventh Cantonese studio album by Chinese recording artist Faye Wong. It was released through Cinepoly Records on 29 June 1994. It confirmed her move into alternative music and covers songs by the Cocteau Twins, whose influence she readily acknowledged.

== Cover art ==
The album cover was unusual for its time: instead of any image of the singer's face, the main cover design shows overlapping phrases such as "no new images" and "no photo booklet" in Chinese characters of varying size, all of which have some strokes missing but allowing the phrase still to be discerned. An alternative cover was all white except for the artist and album name, the latter in the same partial characters. The cover was the first to include the Mandarin name 王菲 (Wang Fei).

== Songs ==
The title track "Random Thoughts" is a cover of the Cocteau Twins' "Bluebeard". Track 5, "Know Oneself and Each Other", covered their song "Know Who You Are at Every Age", which was likewise from their 1993 album Four-Calendar Café. Track 3, "Heaven and Earth", is a cover of Taiwanese singer Phil Chang's 1993 hit "Well-Intentioned" (用心良苦).

"Dream Lover" (sometimes translated "Person in a Dream") is a cover of The Cranberries' "Dreams". It was a successful hit single, and was featured in Wong Kar-wai's critically acclaimed film Chungking Express in which Faye Wong also starred. She also recorded a Mandarin version, "Elude", on Sky. Both versions are still played frequently in Chinese media.

== Track listing ==
Random Thoughts – Standard edition
No.	Title	Writer(s)	Lyrics	Length
1.	"胡思亂想 (Wu Si Lyun Seong)" (Random Thoughts)	Elizabeth Fraser, Robin Guthrie, Simon Raymonde	Albert Leung	3:52
2.	"誓言 (Shi Yan)" (Pledge/Oath)	Dou Wei, Faye Wong	Faye Wong	4:21
3.	"天與地 (Tin Jyu Dei)" (Heaven and Earth)	Richard Lam, Phil Chang	Richard Lam	4:42
4.	"夢中人 (Mung Tsung Yan)" (Dream Lover)	Dolores O'Riordan, Noel Hogan	周禮茂	4:21
5.	"知己知彼 (Zi Gei Zi Bei)" (Know Oneself and Each Other)	Elizabeth Fraser, Robin Guthrie, Simon Raymonde	Albert Leung	3:33
6.	"純情 (Seon Tsing)" (Innocence)	C.Y. Kong	Albert Leung	4:31
7.	"遊戲的終點 (Yau Hei Dik Zung Dim)" (End of the Game)	Phil Chang	Poon Yuen Leung	4:55
8.	"夢遊 (Mung Yau)" (Sleepwalk)	C.Y. Kong	Albert Leung	4:50
9.	"藍色時分 (Laam Sik Si Fan)" (Moment of Blue/Bluesy Moment)	Salsa Chen	Albert Leung	4:12
10.	"回憶是紅色天空 (Wui Yik Si Hung Sik Tin Hung)" (Reminiscence is a Red Sky)	Alvin Leong	Chan Siu-kei	4:14
Total length:				43:31

Japanese edition bonus tracks
No.	Title	Length
11.	"愛, 一次給不完" (Duet with Jacky Cheung)	3:56
12.	"知己知彼" (Europe Mix)	3:18
13.	"非常夏日" (Duet with Jacky Cheung)	4:20
Total length:		11:34

2005 reissue bonus tracks
No.	Title	Length
11.	"愛, 一次給不完" (Duet with Jacky Cheung)	3:56
12.	"知己知彼" (Europe Mix)	3:18
13.	"容易受傷的女人" (Mandarin Version)	4:17
14.	"忘掉你像忘掉我"	4:21
15.	"非常夏日 (Live in Chicago 1975)" (Duet with Jacky Cheung)	3:56
Total length:		19:48

== Charts ==
=== Weekly charts ===
Chart (1994)	Peak position
Hong Kong Albums (IFPI)	1

== Sales and certifications ==
Region	Certification	Certified units/sales
Hong Kong (IFPI Hong Kong)	3× Platinum	150,000^{*}
^{*} Sales figures based on certification alone.

== Release history ==
Region	Release date	Label	Format(s)
Hong Kong	29 June 1994	Cinepoly Records	CD; cassette
Taiwan	29 June 1994	Linfair Records	CD
China	1994	Cai Ling Audio and Video	CD; cassette
Japan	2 November 1994	Polydor Records	CD
Japan	26 September 1997	Polydor Records	CD (reissue)
Hong Kong	May 1999	Cinepoly Records	CD (PolyGram 20th Century Glorious Mark Series)
Hong Kong	14 October 2005	Cinepoly Records	CD (Legend Series)
Hong Kong	15 July 2014	Universal Music Hong Kong	CD (Golden Disc Anniversary Series)
Hong Kong	8 August 2014	Universal Music Hong Kong	LP
Hong Kong	12 November 2020	Universal Music Hong Kong	CD (24K Gold series)
Hong Kong	17 December 2020	Universal Music Hong Kong	LP (ARS series)
Japan	17 February 2021	Universal Music Japan	LP
