= Faye Wong (1997 album) =

Studio album by Faye Wong

Studio album by Faye Wong
- Released: September 26, 1997
- Recorded: 1997
- Studios: Avon Recording Studios (Hong Kong); September Sound (London)
- Genres: Mandopop; dream pop; adult contemporary; indie pop
- Length: 40:39
- Labels: A Production House; EMI
- Producer: Alvin Leong

Faye Wong chronology
Help Yourself (1997)	Faye Wong (1997)	Sing and Play (1998)

Faye Wong (Chinese: 王菲) is the fifth Mandarin-language studio album (fourteenth overall) by Chinese singer Faye Wong. It was released on September 26, 1997, marking the first of her albums under the umbrella of EMI. There are 10 songs in total, one of which is a cover. Unlike her last studio album Fuzao, which was an artistic attempt, this time the album's style is more focused on the balance between mainstream and avant-garde. The album, which was produced by Alvin Leong, is generally languid, mellow and pervaded by an attitude of contentment.

According to Billboard magazine, 25 November 2000, every record Faye Wong released after signing with EMI easily sold more than 500 000 copies in mainland China.

The album sold only modestly in Hong Kong due to the Asian financial crisis, but did well in Taiwan and helped her popularity rise rapidly in mainland China. From this album onwards, Wong's music has been a mix of "alternative" songs and de rigueur love songs, not completely ignoring the market like Fuzao, but also keeping a distance from the mainstream music scene in Hong Kong and Taiwan. Since then, Wong has not considered Hong Kong as her main market, and only a few Cantonese songs are included in her later albums.

== Background and development ==
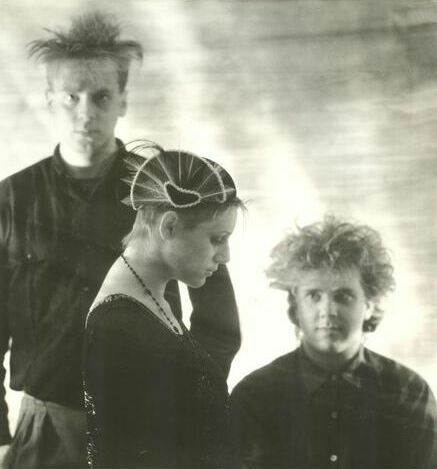
The song "Nostalgia" is a Mandarin adaptation of the song "Rilkean Heart" by Cocteau Twins

In 1994, Wong began to use her birth name to carry out performing arts activities instead of the stage name Shirley Wong. With the adoption of her real name, Wong decided to take a different musical route than that of her Shirley Wong days. Although she was in Hong Kong and collaborated with some Hong Kongese musicians, she did not want to be confined to the Hong Kong market. In 1995, after releasing the album Di-Dar, Wong decided to stop releasing Cantonese albums altogether and start singing in Mandarin. Because Mandarin is Wong's mother tongue, she feels smooth and comfortable when making albums and songs in Mandarin. While preparing for the production of the album, Wong kept listening to the songs and picking them out. When it came to the recording session, she would make adjustments according to the mood and ambient climate at the time of recording.

Nine of the ten songs on the album were written by Albert Leung. Leung considers Wong to be a distinctive female singer with a temperament. In his eyes, Wong is able to perform every song of different styles with quality and charm. Therefore, he tailor-made the lyrics of "You Are Happy So I Am Happy." The tune was casually composed by Zhang Yadong and was later chosen to be Wong's dedication to her first daughter Leah Dou. The song "Another Paradise" was composed by Miyuki Nakajima herself for Wong. The song "Hangout" was customized by the Scottish band Cocteau Twins. In addition, Wong also performed a Chinese cover version of the band's song "Rilkean Heart," which became the song "Nostalgia."

== Writing and composition ==
In the album Faye Wong, Wong has intensified her attire but lightened her voice. In terms of vocal technique, the album is simple. Because of this, the album's melodic sound is emphasized. The album's opening track "Perversity" is an adult contemporary ballad. The song "Bored" is a mid-tempo British pop rock song, which is one of the most noteworthy songs on the album. The song paints a bouncy image of Wong showing a life of aspirations. The attitude reflected in the lyrics of "Bored" has become a sample of feminist studies in the late 1990s.

The song "Hangout" features Wong's laid-back vocals with a mesmerizing score that is able to capture the listener's ears. The arrangement of "Nostalgia" is different from the original version from the Cocteau Twins, carrying a simple guitar accompaniment. The melody of "Fussy" is catchy and endearing, while "A Big Deal" is a light-hearted number that Wong delivers with ease. In "You Are Happy So I Am Happy," the seemingly simple murmurs actually test Wong's singing skills. In the song "Infatuation," the light and simple singing paves the atmosphere of the whole song, and in the song "Unwilling," the line "If I quit, I'm just saying if" is prudent, seeming reluctant and helpless.

== Reception ==
The album was massively successful in Taiwan and has since sold 450,000 copies there. It also went platinum in Hong Kong, sold over 100,000 copies in Malaysia, and over 60,000 copies in Singapore, making it the best-selling album by a female artist in Singapore and Malaysia of 1997.

== Accolades ==
In 1997, the hit song "You Are Happy So I Am Happy" made into the leaderboard of the 6th Chinese Music Awards' Top 20 Songs. The album Faye Wong was selected as one of the "Top 10 Albums of 1997" by the Chinese Musicians Association. In 2009, Faye Wong was selected into the "Top 100 Albums from 1993 to 2005" in the Taiwanese Popular Music Top 200 Albums book planned and produced by the Taiwan Chinese Musicians Exchange Association, ranking 71st.

== Track listing ==
All lyrics are written by Albert Leung with the exception of Wyman Wong's contribution on track 8, Daryl Yao's contribution on track 9 and Huang Guilan's contribution on track 10.

No.	Title	Music	Arranger(s)	Length
1.	"麻醉" (Perversity)	Zhou Fengling	Adrian Chan	4:00
2.	"你快樂 (所以我快樂)" (You Are Happy So I Am Happy)	Zhang Yadong	Zhang Yadong	4:18
3.	"悶" (Bored)	Zhang Yadong	Zhang Yadong	4:15
4.	"娛樂場" (Hangout)	Robin Guthrie; Simon Raymonde	Adrian Chan	3:26
5.	"人間" (Another Paradise)	Miyuki Nakajima	Adrian Chan	4:45
6.	"我也不想這樣" (Unwilling)	Alex San	Alex San	4:56
7.	"小題大做" (Fussy)	BlackBox	BlackBox	3:27
8.	"懷念" (Nostalgia)	Elizabeth Fraser; Robin Guthrie; Simon Raymonde	Zhang Yadong	3:21
9.	"撲火" (Infatuation)	Salsa Chen	Adrian Chan	4:15
10.	"雲端" (Silver Lining)	Lee Cheng-Fan	Ted Lo	3:56

== Charts ==
Chart (1997)	Peak position
Malaysian Albums (RIM)	6
Taiwanese Albums (IFPI Taiwan)	3

== Sales and certifications ==
Region	Certification	Certified units/sales
Hong Kong (IFPI Hong Kong)	Platinum	50,000^{*}
Taiwan	—	450,000
^{*} Sales figures based on certification alone.
