= Li Yuchun discography =

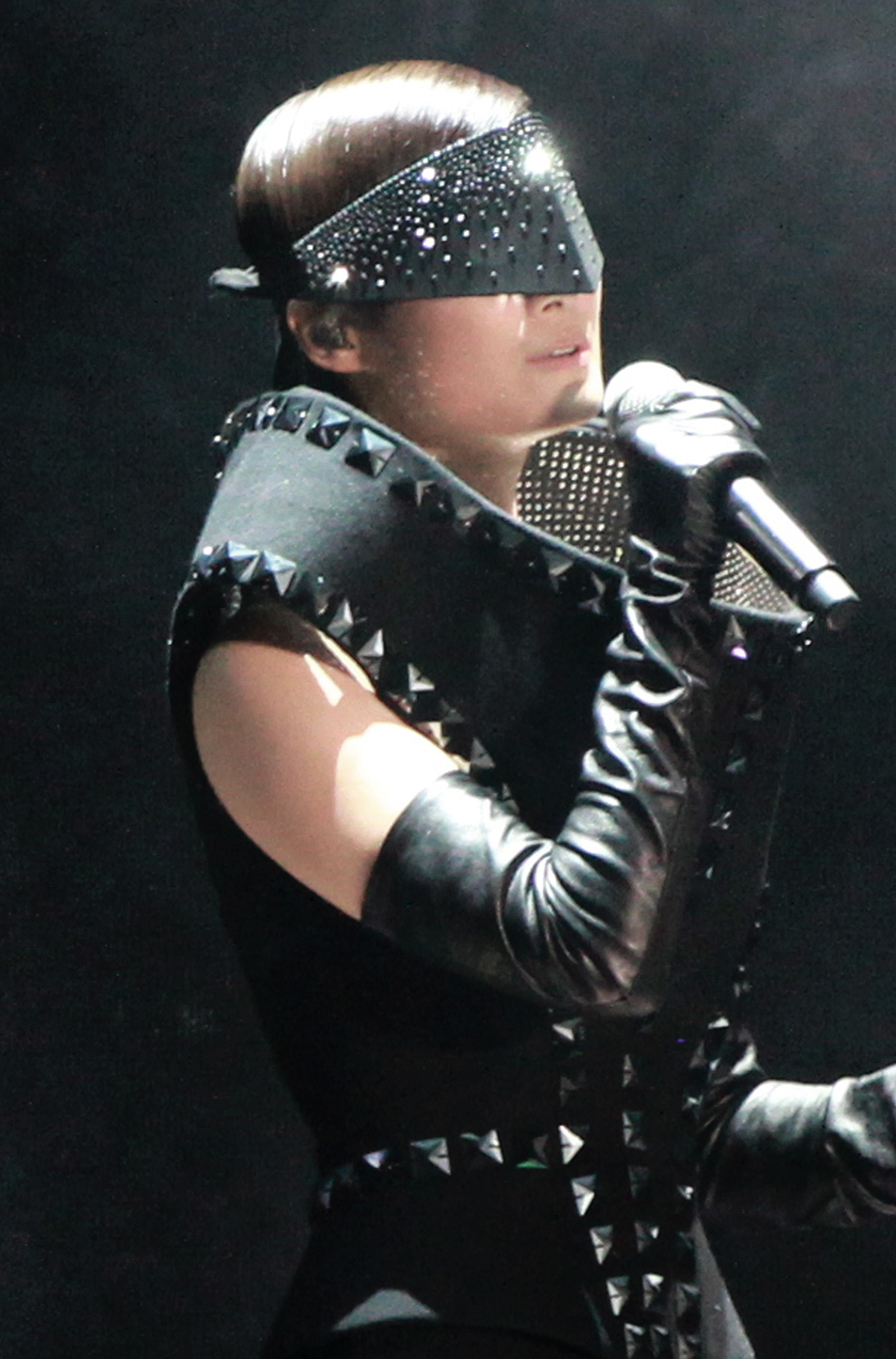
- Li in 2015
- Studio albums: 10
- EPs: 2
- Compilation albums: 1

This is the discography of Chinese singer Li Yuchun (李宇春).

== Albums ==
=== Studio albums ===
Title	Details	Sales
The Queen and the Dreams	Released: September 15, 2006; Label: Taihe Rye; Format: CD, digital download	CHN: 1,370,000
Mine	Released: November 2, 2007; Label: Taihe Rye; Format: CD, digital download	CHN: 850,000
The Literary Youth Who Can Dance	Released: April 12, 2011; Label: EE Media; Format: CD, digital download	
Old If Not Wild	Released: September 4, 2012; Label: EE Media; Format: CD, digital download	
A Magical Encounter 1987	Released: July 30, 2014; Label: EE Media; Format: CD, digital download	
Growing Wild	Released: November 22, 2016; Label: Yellow Stone; Format: CD, digital download	CHN: 6,000,000 (dl.)
Liu Xing	Released: November 7, 2017; Label: Yellow Stone; Format: CD, digital download	
Wow	Released: July 24, 2019; Label: Yellow Stone; Format: CD, digital download	CHN: 1,370,000 (dl.)
Have a Nice Weekend (週末愉快)	Released: April 10, 2023; Label: Yellow Stone; Format: CD, digital download	

=== Compilation albums ===
Title	Details
N+1 Evolution	Released: December 16, 2008; Label: Taihe Rye; Format: CD, digital download

== Extended plays ==
Title	Details	Sales
The Special Greeting for Chris' Birthday	Released: March 10, 2006; Label: Taihe Rye; Format: CD, digital download	
Youth of China	Released: April 29, 2008; Label: Taihe Rye; Format: CD, digital download	CHN: 100,000

== Singles ==
List of singles, showing year and chart positions
Title	Year	Peak chart positions	Sales
Title	Year	CHN	Sales
"Youth of China" (少年中国)	2008	—	CHN: 2,028,549
"Mulan" (木兰)	2018	6	
"New Species"	2019	8	
"You Are the April of the World" (你是人间的四月天)	2019	3	
"As a Monster" (作为怪物) (with Wu Qing-feng)	2019	5	
"If I'm Not Me" (如果我不是我)	2019	14	
"Ambition" (野望)	2019	15	
"Yong Chun" (咏春)	2019	19	
"Peace Through the Years" (岁岁平安)	2020	3	
"Facing the Ocean, Flowers Bloom" (面朝大海，春暖花开)	2020	11	
"For Girls" (给女孩)	2020	2	
"Priceless" (无价之姐)	2020	3	
"国家2020"	2020	19	
"Good Good"	2020	16	
"The Reader" (把我最爱的文字读给你听) (with MC HotDog)	2020	7	
"Weakness" (软肋)	2021	7	
"Shut Up and Dance" (闭嘴跳舞)	2021	9	
"Shining Part of You" (银河中的星星)	2021	22	
"Qingfu" (清福)	2021	23	
"Promise to the World" (向世界承诺)	2022	85	
"Breathe the Same Air" (因为我们呼吸同样的空气)	2023	95	
"The World is Worth It" (人间值得)	2024	—	
"—" denotes releases that did not chart or chart did not exist.

== Other songs ==
Type	Single name	Introduction
First single	1. Honey, I love you 甜蜜的，我爱你; 2. Happy winter 冬天快乐	1. Truly First Single Song; 2. First Single Song after entering the Music circle officially
Songs for movie and TV	1. Ice Chrysanthemum story 冰菊物语; 2. Love Blindly 爱的太傻; 3. The Fragrant Pear Blossom 梨花香; 4. Powder 粉末; 5. AOAEO Go AOAEO出发; 6. At least you have me 还有我疼你; 7. Prologue 序幕; 8. My love 9. To cherish 珍惜; 10. Moved for Love 为爱感动; 11. Cold blade 刀锋偏冷; 12. Walk into Your Dream 走进你的梦; 13. Mountains May Depart 山河故人; 14. If You Were The Only Girl In The World; 15. Can't Forget You 你是如此难以忘记; 16. Chinatown 唐人街	1. Theme song for Encouraging Cosmic Ice Chrysanthemum story 冰菊物语; 2. Chinese Theme Song for Korean TV Princess Hours; 3. Theme song for movie Shi Quan Jiu Mei 十全九美; 4. Theme song for movie Bodyguards and Assassins / Interlude song for movie Qing Jia Guo Nian 亲家过年; 5. Theme song for Chinese cartoon production Story of a Journey to the West; 6. Theme song for movie Love in Cosmo; 7. Theme song for Music Movie Prologue; 8. Interlude song for Music Movie Prologue; 9. Theme song for TV series Legend of Lu Zhen; 10. Theme song for TV series Plainclothesman Team; 11. Theme song for movie The Guillotines; 12. Theme song for modern drama A Dream Like A Dream (2013); 13. Theme song for Mountains May Depart; 14. Theme song for I love you, too. 恋爱排班表; 15. Theme song for The Grandmaster (film)(3D version 2015); 16. Theme song for Detective Chinatown 唐人街探案
Commercial song	1. Be myself as young generation 真我新生代; 2. Green Mood 绿色心情; 3. Happy Wake Up; 4. See you Next Crossing 下个，路口，见	1. Advertising song for Mengniu Milk; 2. Advertised song for Mengniu Green Mood Ice Cream 蒙牛绿色心情雪糕广告曲; 3. Advertised Song for Crest tooth paste cool and white 佳洁士牙膏广告曲; 4. Advertised Song for Yikalu Shampoo 伊卡璐洗发水
Theme song	1. Sing loudly 唱得响亮; 2. Come to dance 来跳舞吧; 3. Extremely Beauty 倾国倾城; 4. Famous Worldwide 红遍全球; 5. Why Me; 6. Sichuan embroidery 蜀绣; 7. Routine of Xiangjiang River 湘江的笔画; 8. Wonderful Time 纯真年代	1. Theme song for Super Girl on Hunan Television; 2. Theme song for Dancing Music Live show in Hunan Television 舞动奇迹; 3. Theme song for Extremely Beauty Live Show in China Central Television; 4. Theme song for 2008 Summer Olympics of Coca-Cola; 5. Theme song for WhyMe Chris Lee Concert; 6. Official publicized song for Sichuan embroidery (International intangible cultural heritage); 7. Theme song for 60th celebration party of celebrating national day of Hunan Xiang River; 8. Theme song for Live Show in Shenzhen Media Group
Charity theme song	1. Just like you 和你一样; 2. Promise 承诺; 3. Delivering Love by Love 爱把爱传递; 4. Affection is more important than blood 情比血浓; 5. Shock the hearts of people 震动人心; 6. We Chinese 我们中国人; 7. Kids of Land 大地的孩子; 8. doremifasol 9. Light the hope with love 用爱点亮希望; 10. Impossible Voice 不可能的声音; 11. Little Wings 小翅膀	1. Theme song for Corn Charity Fund of Chinese Red Cross Fund 玉米爱心基金; 2. Theme song for relief operation in Phoenix Television/ chorus song for 2008 Sichuan earthquake 3. Relief operation song organized by DONG MUSIC [www.dongmusic.com 東乐] and Taihe Rye Music / chorus song for 2008 Sichuan earthquake 4. Relief operation song in Hunan Television/ chorus song or 2008 Sichuan earthquake 5. Relief operation song organized by Shenzhen Radio FM 97.1 and Malaysia FM988 (深圳电台飞扬971,马来西亚FM988电台)/ chorus song for 2008 Sichuan earthquake 6. Relief operation song organized by EE-Media/ chorus song for 2008 Sichuan earthquake 7. Relief operation song cooperated by Chinese and Korean singers / chorus song for 2008 Sichuan earthquake 8. Cherish theme song for "2007 I WANT TO GO TO SCHOOL" program 我要上学/ chorus song 9. Theme song for "2008 I WANT TO GO TO SCHOOL" cherish assisting program 10. Publicized song for caring Hearing disabled children in China; 11. Theme song for China Children and Teenagers Fund
Sports theme song	1. Olympic Beijing 奥运北京; 2. We are the world 3. Smile, Beijing 微笑北京; 4. Believe 相信; 5. We are Ready; 6. Beijing Welcomes You 北京欢迎你; 7. Time Together across the ocean 天涯共此时; 8. Every one 9. I'm here 我在这里; 10. Best Wishes from Beijing 北京祝福你	1. Theme song for Volunteer in Beijing Olympic Games (2008 Summer Olympics) / chorus song 2. Theme song for Olympics hero in Tianjin Television / chorus song for 2008 Summer Olympics; 3. Publicized song for Beijing Olympic sport meeting and chorus song for 2008 Summer Olympics; 4. Publicized song for Beijing Olympic sport meeting 5. Theme song for one year counting of Beijing Olympic Games/ chorus song 6. Theme song for 100 days counting of Beijing Olympic Games / chorus song 7. Official theme song for 2010 Asian Games; 8. Official theme song for 2010 Asian Games / chorus song 9. Official theme song for Volunteer of 2011 Summer Universiade; 10. Beijing Publicized song for 2012 Summer Olympics/ Chorus song
Environment theme song	1. Green; 2. Deeply Greeting 深深的祝福; 3. The sun in the palm 掌心的太阳	1. Song for Greenpeace with Catcher in the Rye (band) 麦田守望者乐队; 2. Last Song in Yuanxiao Celebration Party in Hunan Television in 2008/ with Chen Chusheng; 3. Publicized song for relief operations in Spring Festival Celebration Party in Hunan Television in 2009 / with Huang Xiaoming
Mixed version	1. WhyMe 2010; 2. HNTV; 3. See u Next Crossing (advertised version of Shampoo) 下个，路口，见 花香版	1. 2010 WhyMe Chris Lee Concert Theme Song; 2. Publicized song for Hunan Television (HNTV); 3. Advertised song for Yikalu Shampoo
Double single	1. Real Love/ Only You; 2. 爱有引力/ 混蛋，我想你 (Chinese version)	Li Yuchun collaboration with A.G. Cook of PC Music
