= Xunliao Bay =

Bay in Guangdong, China

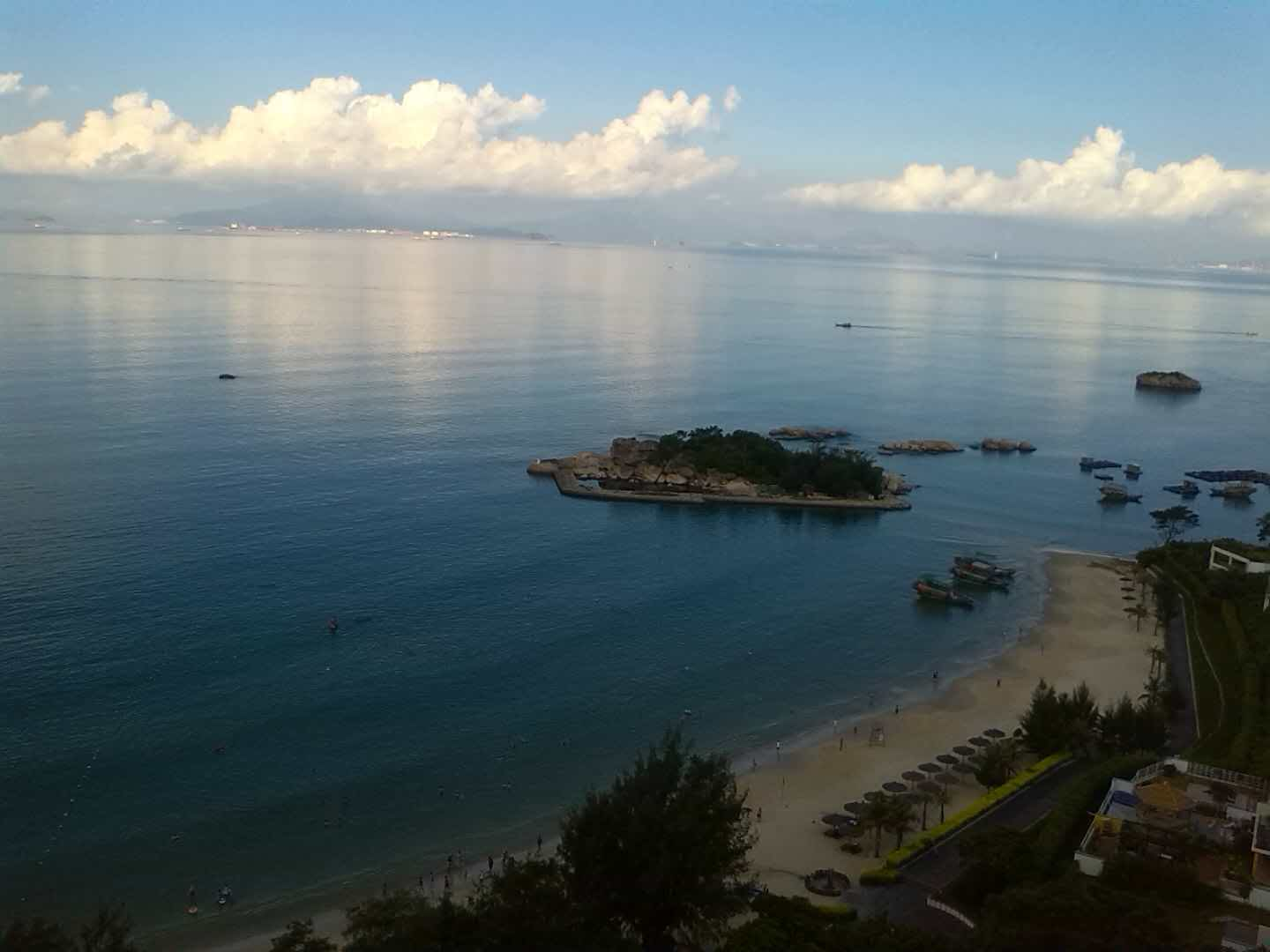
Seascape of Xunliao Bay, Guangdong, China.

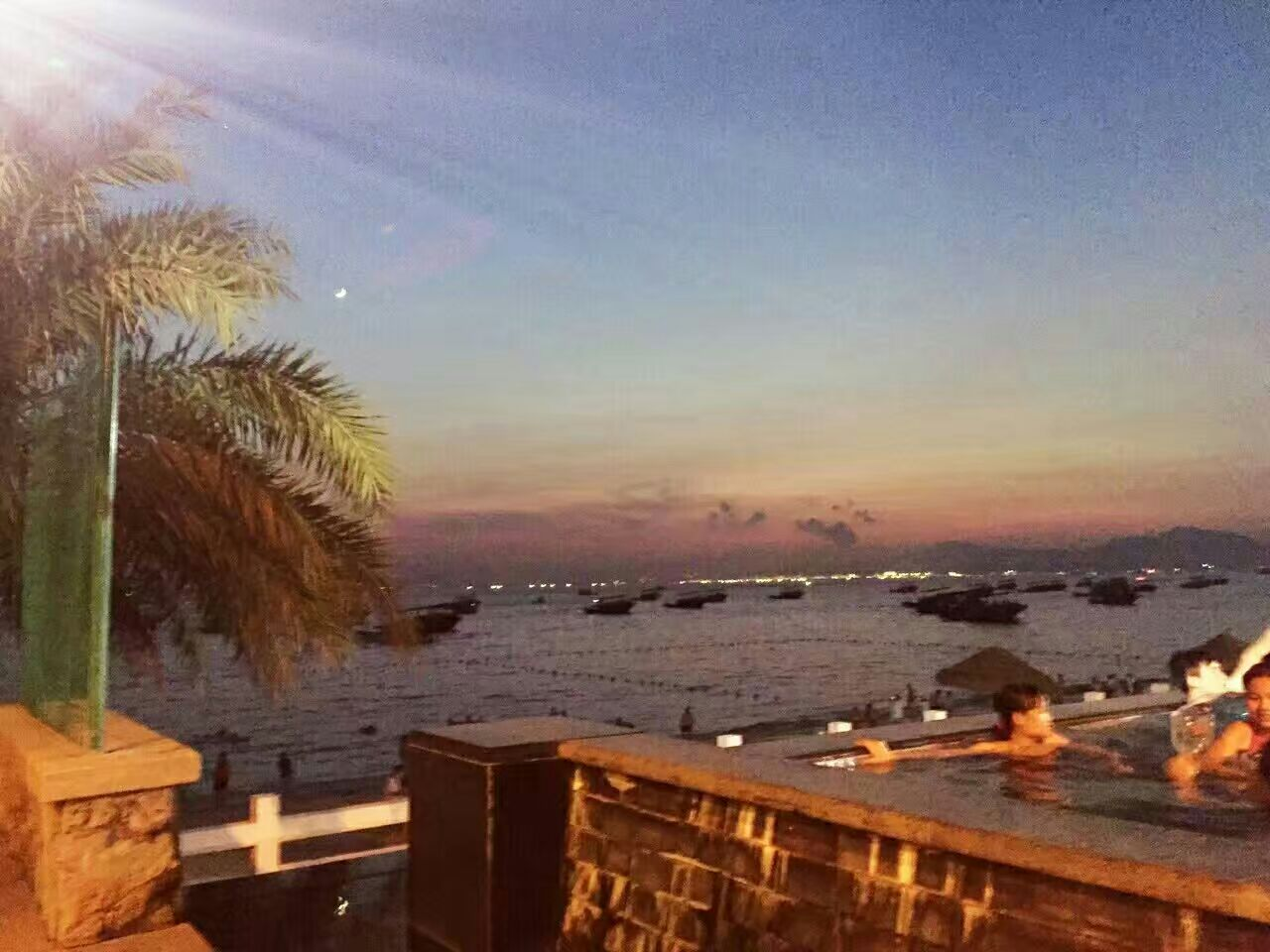
A Night Scene of Xunliao Bay, Guangdong, China.

Xunliao Bay (Chinese: 巽寮湾), located in the east of the Daya Bay, the eastern part of the Pearl River Delta in Guangdong, falling into the humid subtropical climate, is a tourist resort characterized by a total jurisdiction of 105 square kilometers and spring all year round with an average temperature of 21.7 °C. Xunliao Bay is honored as a dazzling pearl among Guangdong coastal areas.

== Etymology ==
According to folklores, there are mainly two kinds of origins of the name Xunliao:

The first one is related to Su Shi, an eminent writer in the Northern Song dynasty. Due to his opposition Wang Anshi's political reforms, Su was banished to Huiyang District where he preferred traveling to Xunliao to avoid summer heat. At that time, Xunliao was named as "Yaliao" (鴨寮), however, Su found Daya Bay looked like the image of Bagua (八卦) and Xunliao just located at the direction of “Xun” (巽), which in Bagua represented "wind" (風). The “wind”echoes with the image of sea, and thus Su changed the name into “Xunliao”.

The other dates back to A.D. 1447 when the place was originally named Shunliao (順寮); After a fire, the locals started to regard the name as an ill omen and decided to use the character “Xun” in Bagua to replace "Shun" (順) in order to avoid bad luck. Since then this area has been named as Xunliao.

== Tourism development ==
Throughout history, the local people made a living on agriculture and fishery industry, which still has a space to develop though there is an increasing growth in living standards. In 1990s, however, with the attention and administration of the governments from the county, the city and the province, a tourist industry emerged, and since then, it has made a growing contribution to the local economy.

Xunliao Bay's natural conditions provide tourism resources like precious stones, clear water and white sands. It has been advertised through various names, such as “Animal-shaped Stone Park” (动物石景公园), “Green Jade” (绿色翡翠), “A Godsend Platinum Bank” (天赐白金堤) and “The Oriental Hawaii” (东方夏威夷). Tourism has therefore developed rapidly in the past decades.

- In 1993, Xunliao Bay was rated as a municipal tourist resort.
- In 1996, Xunliao was entitled as a major scenic spots in the eastern part of Guangdong.
- In 2000, the area was confirmed as a first-class reservation in Huizhou City.
- At the beginning of 2002, the establishment of the Xunliao Bay Tourist Management Committee, which is responsible for the governance of tourism resources with unified protection and integrated planning, was approved by the People's Government of Huizhou City.
- In 2005, Huizhou brought in Financial Street Real Estate Co., Ltd. (金融街惠州置业有限公司) for Xunliao Bay, which made a great-leap-forward achievement in terms of its development and construction.
- In 2011, 2.02 million tourists paid a visit to Xunliao Bay, and the tourism revenue totaled 230 million Renminbi.

== Points of interest ==
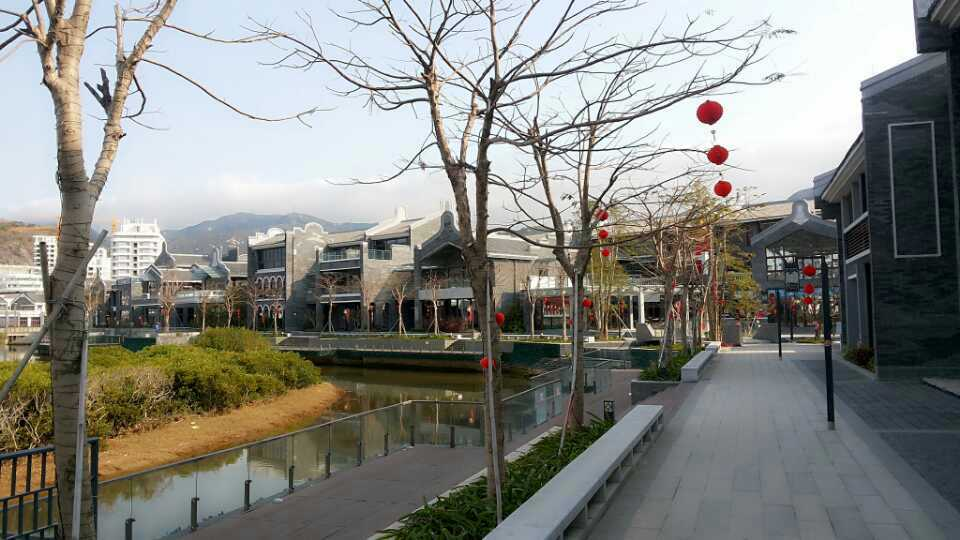
Queen of Heaven Palace

The Queen of Heaven Palace (天后宫) is a leisure cultural scenic spot that combines sightseeing, catering, shopping and folk customs experiencing. Covering a floor space of about 55,120 square meters, of which about 28,882 square meters is used for the facilities such as palaces, catering and shopping services, bar street, and performance center, etc.

The overall architectural style is based on the Lingnan Customs, such as the 9.9-meter-high honorific arch at the entrance of the commercial street, Lingnan cuisine restaurants, Lingnan craft shops and other stores on both sides of the street. A major reflection of Mazu, Hakka and marine cultures lies in the construction of the Queen of Heaven Palace, which is located in the heart of the street. Inside the building, the largest Mazu statue of 5.3-meter height in Guangdong can be found, so does the bronze embossments of Hakka people's migration map. The first Mazu Culture Festival in Xunliao was held there in the year of 2012.

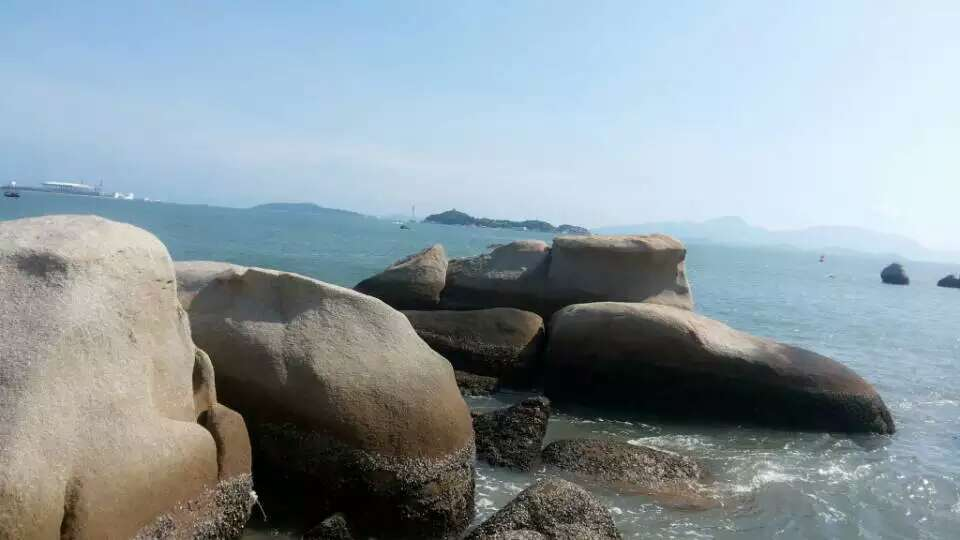
Rock Garden, Guangdong, China.

The Natural Rock Formations (奇石群) are found along the coast. Exposed to the wind and waves, the rocks of various forms gradually appear for a thousand-year erosion. In the distance, these rocks look like animals playing on the beach, and thus some literati named them with poetic beauty, for example, “a seal turning the mill” (海狗推磨), “a sheep playing in the sea” (绵羊戏海), and “a steed exploring the sea” (骏马探海), etc.
