= Port of Huizhou =

Coordinates: 22°51′51″N 113°24′27″E

Port of Huizhou 惠州港
- Interactive map of Port of Huizhou 惠州港

Location
- Country: People's Republic of China
- Location: Huizhou, Guangdong Province

Details
- Opened: 1992
- Operated by: Huizhou Port Group; Huizhou Port Industrial Corporation, Ltd.
- Owned by: People's Republic of China
- Type of harbour: Natural Seaport
- Employees: 400

Statistics
- registered capital: 8.1 billion RMB (2012)
- Website; Website of the Port of Huizhou

The Port of Huizhou is a natural coastal port located in Huizhou, Guangdong, People's Republic of China, immediately east of Shenzhen and Hong Kong. It opens into the Daya Bay. Started only 20 years ago, it has moved from a fishing village to another large player in the Pearl River Delta shipping hub. In 2012, its total cargo throughput was 51,18 million tonnes.

The port is linked to the Chinese railway network by the Huizhou–Dayawan railway.

== Layout and facilities ==
Huizhou Port is divided into three main port areas: the Quanwan Port Area, the Dongma Port Area and the Huidong Port Area.

Huizhou Port in 2012 had 51 berths, 39 production berths, of which 18 were deep-water 100000DWT berths, including 2 150,000DWT berths and 1 300,000DWT berth.

=== Quanwan Port Area ===
The Quanwan Port Area (荃湾港区) (not to be confused with the identically named Tsuen Wan area of Hong Kong) is a joint of the Huizhou Port Group and Hutchinson Whampoa. It has 1,714m of quayside and berths of all types. There are scheduled barge routes between the port area and Hong Kong, Guangzhou Nansha and Shenzhen Hekou, as a way to increase regional connectivity.

Under construction there are 3 container berths of 100,000DWT, 2 general cargo berths of 50,000-80,000DWT, and 2 oil berths of 80,000DWT, 5 of 5,000DWT and 2 of 3,000DWT.

1. First Phase General Wharf (一期通用码头): 1x10,000DWT and 1x30,000DWT bulk cargo berths. Annual capacity 0.8Mt. Depth 12.5m
2. Port Industries Oil and Gas Terminal (港业油气码头): 1x30,000DWT, 1x3, ---DWT. Annual capacity: 1.18Mt
3. Zehua Oil Terminal (泽华码头): 1x30,000DWT, 1x5,000DWT. Annual capacity 1.38Mt.
4. Port Industries Break Bulk Terminal (港业散货码头): 1 berth 30,000 DWT; Annual capacity: 0.5Mt.
5. 5,000 tonne Container Specialized Berth (5000吨级集装箱专用泊位): 1x5,000DWT. Annual capacity: 10,000TEU
6. Dagang Petrochemical Terminal (惠州大港石化码头): 1x30,000DWT, 2x3,000DWT. Annual capacity: 95Mt.
7. Huizhou International Container Terminal (惠州国际集装箱码头): 2x50,000DWT, 1x3,000DWT. Annual capacity: 800,000TEU. 800m quayside. Depth 15.7m.

A coal terminal started construction in July 2013 and was opened on 1 November 2018. It is directly connected to the railway.

=== Dongma Port Area ===
The Dongma Port Area (东马港区) focuses on petrochemicals and LNG, and it includes the deep-water berths built on Mabian Island.

1. Huade Petrochemical Mabian Island Crude Oil Terminal #1 (华德石化马鞭洲原油码头1号泊位) 1 crude oil berth 150,000 DWT. Annual capacity 1,2Mt
2. CNOOC and Shell Mabian Island Crude Oil Wharf (中海壳牌马鞭洲原油码头): 1 crude oil berth 80,000DWT Annual capacity: 0.8Mt
3. CNOOC and Shell-Donglianchem Terminal (中海壳牌东联化工): 1x40,000DWT, 2x10,000DWT, 1x2,000DWT. Annual Capacity: 2.5Mt
4. Huade Petrochemcial Mabian Island Crude Oil Terminal #2 (华德石化马鞭洲原油码头2号泊位): 1 crude oil berth 300,000DWT. Annual capacity 2.1Mt.
5. CNOOC Donglian Refined Oil Terminal (中海油东联成品油码头): 1x30,000DWT, 4x5,000DWT, 1 petroleum and coke bulk berth 20,000DWT Annual capacity: 9.4Mt
6. CNOOC Mabian Island Crude Oil Terminal (中海油马鞭洲原油码头): 1x300,000DWT berth. Annual capacity: 1.8Mt
7. Huizhou Daya Bay Oiltanking Public Terminal (惠州大亚湾欧德油储公用石化码头): 2x5,000DWT. Annual capacity 1.6Mt
8. Huizhou Guohua Thermoelectric Comprehensive Coal Terminal (惠州国华热电配套煤炭码头): 1x50,000DWT. Annual capacity: 3Mt.
9. Huizhou Daya Bay Petrochemical Industrial Zone Public Petrochemical Terminal (惠州大亚湾石化工业区公用石化码头): 2x5,000DWT. Annual Capacity: 0.8Mt.

=== Huidong Port Area ===
The Huidong Port (惠东港区) covers a number of smaller wharves on the east of the Bay, focusing on bulk and general cargo, as well as river barge transshipment.

1. Bijia Shawan Comprehensive Terminal (碧甲沙湾综合码头): 3x1,000DWT. Annual capacity: 0.2Mt
2. Yapojiao Unloading Point (亚婆角装卸点): 3x1,000-2,000DWT. Annual capacity: 0.2Mt
3. Da'aotang Terminal (大澳塘码头): 1xw3,000DWT, 1 workboat wharf. Annual capacity: 80,000 TEU.
4. Pinghai Electricity Plant Integrated Coal Terminal (平海电厂配套煤码头): 1x150,000 coal berth, 1x3,000 comprehensive berth. Annual capacity: 6.55Mt
