= HNS =

HNS may refer to:

- hns, ISO 639-3 code for the Caribbean Hindustani language
- Hrvatski nogometni savez (Croatian Football Federation)
- Hrvatski narodni savez (Croatian National Alliance) (1998-2004), a political party in the Vojvodina region of Serbia
- Hrvatska narodna stranka-Liberalni Demokrati (Croatian People's Party – Liberal Democrats), a political party in Croatia
- "Hack 'n' slay", alternate term for the Hack and slash video gaming genre
- HNS, IATA and FAA LID code for Haines Airport in Alaska, United States
- Hexanitrostilbene, an explosive
- HNS Convention, an international agreement on hazardous substances in the sea
- Sikorsky HNS-1, US Navy designation of the Sikorsky R-4 helicopter
- Hughes Network Systems, an American telecommunications company
- Huizhou Nanshan School, a private primary and secondary school in Guangdong, China
- Hyperosmolar nonketotic state, an alternate name for Hyperosmolar hyperglycemic state
