= KELZIE =

Chinese Musician

Qiaozhi Sun (born December 8, 1991), known professionally as KELZIE, is a Chinese music producer, composer, lyricist, arranger, singer, and DJ.

He studied at Berklee College of Music and gained recognition for composing songs like "A Magical Encounter 1987" for Li Yuchun. He collaborated with Li Yuchun again for the theme song "Ms Priceless", of the show "Sisters Who Make Waves," winning awards.

In 2022, he was the producer and songwriter for the song "PLAYBOY," sung by CoCo Lee, which was released on November 25. The remix version was released on December 24.

On February 14, 2023, after more than half a year of production, his self-designed and shot cover and song teaser for the song "TRAGIC," a song tailor-made for CoCo Lee, was released through Warner Music. He personally composed, produced, and supervised the song's production.

He also produced and supervised "Battle Song," the theme song of Tencent Video's animated series "Soul Land Double Gods Battle," which was sung by CoCo Lee and released on May 20, 2023.
