= The Catcher in the Rye (disambiguation) =

The Catcher in the Rye is a 1951 novel by J. D. Salinger.

The Catcher in the Rye may also refer to:

- Catcher in the Rye (band), a Chinese punk rock band
- "Catcher in the Rye", a 2008 song by Guns N' Roses from Chinese Democracy

== See also ==
- Catcher in the Wry, an autobiography by Bob Uecker
- Coming Through the Rye (film) 2015 film directed by James Steven Sadwith
