= Skai Isyourgod =

Chinese rapper (born 1998)

- Born: Chen Xukai; 24 December 1998 (age 27); Huizhou, Guangdong, China
- Genres: Memphis Rap; Guangdong music; Gangsta rap; Comedy hip-hop; Hokkien music; Chaoshan music
- Years active: 2020–present
- Labels: RCA; Sony Music; Showstart Release; Taihe Music Group
- Education: Sichuan Media College

Chinese name
- Simplified Chinese: 陈序垲
- Traditional Chinese: 陳序塏
Transcriptions
Standard Mandarin
- Hanyu Pinyin: Chén Xùkǎi

Chen Xukai (Chinese: 陈序垲; pinyin: Chén Xùkǎi; born 24 December 1998), known professionally as Skai Isyourgod (Chinese: 揽佬SKAI ISYOURGOD; pinyin: Lǎnlǎo; Jyutping: laam2 lou2; stylized in all-caps), is a Chinese rapper. His works combine Memphis rap and Cantonese culture.

In August 2024, Skai Isyourgod released his second album, Stacks from All Sides (八方来财). Songs such as "Stacks from All Sides", "Karma Code" (因果), and "Blueprint Supreme" (大展鸿图) in the album went viral on Western and Chinese social media. On 7 July 2025, he exceeded 3 million active monthly listeners on Spotify, becoming the most-streamed Chinese artist of the month.

== Early life and education ==
Chen Xukai was born in the city of Huizhou, Guangdong, China, in 1998. His father is from Leshan, Sichuan. He attended the private Sichuan Media College (Chinese: 四川传媒学院) in Chengdu, Sichuan, for undergraduate studies in performing arts.

== Career ==
On 20 December 2020, Skai released his first single "Know That" on NetEase Cloud Music, and released several singles in succession, experimenting with several styles, including R&B. On 14 April 2023, he released the single "Lan Lao King". According to Skai in an interview with the Chinese hip-hop platform SoulSense TWH, it was the beginning of the creation of his signature Memphis rap style, his most recent experimental style.

On 10 September 2023, Skai released his first album, Shunfeng Shunshui Shuncai Shen (顺风顺水顺财神).

On 20 August 2024, Skai released his second album, Stacks from All Sides (八方来财). The album continued to use Memphis rap music as the creative basis, integrating Cantonese folk elements and ridicule of the workplace environment and human relationships in mainland China. The album went viral across social media, and Internet secondary creations, such as the Douyin broadcaster Xiao Cao Animation, further popularized Skai. In April 2025, Skai announced that he would move to Taiwan to host a special concert on 27 July.

On 10 July 2025, Skai released his first extended play album Stacks from All Sides: Fresh Off the Boat (八方来财之江船入海) on Music Streaming Services, which includes nine songs which had never been officially released before. He marks it as a part of Stacks from All Sides. Chinese Hip-Hop producer Jacking joined as Executive Producer. Almost all tracks were solely produced by Jacking, except Track 8, which was produced by Jacking in addition to another producer named Phantom.

On April 7, 2026, the group "5 Idioms" (Chinese: 伍條柒; Jyutping: ng5 tiu4 cat1), consisting of Skai, SoulHan, and Y.H.L (YoungHighLos: A Niu, PlayerJ, and Bu Bu Gao), released their self-titled mixtape. 5 Idiots held an online fan interaction hosted by NetEase Cloud Music in January after the announcement of their formation, during which Skai Isyourgod mentioned that his next album was scheduled to be released the following year.

On September 10, 2026, Sony Music Entertainment (China) announced that it had signed Skai to RCA Records Greater China.

On September 16, 2026, Skai released the single "The Diplomats" (Chinese: 外交官; pinyin: wàijiāoguān) featuring Project Pat on major music streaming platforms. It was his first single released under RCA Records Greater China.

=== Stacks from All Sides ===
Stacks from All Sides 八方来财

Studio album by Skai Isyourgod
- Released: 20 August 2024
- Length: 54:32
- Language: Mandarin Chinese
- Label: Showstart Release
- Producers: Jacking; WNSbeats; Painhunter; Beatlab Studio; Electrojax; Beatroot; Bullethx; PerryAple; TrashBaggBeatz; QuashiRed; Cheezywhero; AntNorth; Cheeze; Spancy Beatz

Skai Isyourgod chronology
顺风顺水顺财神 (2023)	Stacks from All Sides 八方来财 (2024)

Singles from Stacks from All Sides
- 1. "Greenbelt Play (绿化带)" Released: 30 May 2024

In the album Stacks from All Sides (Note: Chinese: 八方来财; pinyin: bā fāng lái cái), three songs went viral: "Stacks from All Sides" (八方来财), "Karma Code" (因果), and "Blueprint Supreme" (大展鸿图). Skai's southeast Chinese coastal roots are noticeable through his Cantonese accent and numerous allusions and literary devices.

In the first half of the album, Skai explores the ambitions of people in contemporary Chinese society to expand their material desires. In the second half of the album, he incorporates his own life into the album, exploring the contradictions during early adulthood, societal temptations, and cherishing loved ones.

==== Summary ====
The three viral songs come from the first half of the album. The title track, "Stacks from All Sides" (八方来财) begins by sampling Korean singer Insooni's 1987 song "Beetle on Vinyl" (Korean: 비닐장판의 딱정벌레). The song describes a life full of hustle. It opens with folk imagery, in which the person dreams of social climbs, whether it be acquiring a better scooter, buying new fancy clothes, showing off his wealth, or upgrading to a white or yellow motorcycle license plate. White and yellow ones in Guangdong and Hong Kong are a sign of success, thus being a local status symbol. Wearing jade pendants for luck, keeping a home altar with incense and offerings, regularly bowing and praying, and seeking wealth from the divine, they are constantly chasing money and status, but not through glorified business. The man does gambling, plays mahjong, and has side hustles to achieve this. He knows the methodology of his social ascension is bad, but does it anyway, alluding to cultural elements such as yin-yang from Taoism and karma from Buddhism.

"Karma Code" (因果) tells about someone who is confronted by the divine about their unethical social rise by traditional Chinese deities, who seek to address the consequences of his deeds. Initially, the protagonist tries to appease the gods, then shift the blame, but is eventually forced to reflect on and acknowledge his actions.Additionally, the intro to “Karma Code” samples “Tianfu Yue” from the 1986 television series Journey to the West.

"Blueprint Supreme" (大展鸿图) begins by sampling lines from a performance of the Cantonese opera The Flower Princess (Chinese: 帝女花; pinyin: Dì Nǚ Huā). The lyrics paint exaggerated, humorous portraits of a nouveau riche lifestyle, describing lavish yet strangely familiar scenes of showy wealth in modern China, such as the scene of "singing karaoke in the villa and silver arowana in the pool" (Chinese: 别墅里面唱k，水池里面银龙鱼), which is a unique way of "showing off wealth" for Guangdong's wealthy, rather than luxury cars and watches in the traditional sense. In addition, the plot of "the master writes the words himself" (Chinese: 大师亲手题笔字) in the lyrics comes from his parents' obsession with Yi Tou (Chinese: 意头) and belief in Feng Shui during his childhood, as well as people's memory of using "qiu zi" (Chinese: 求字, lit. 'asking for a character')—the practice of asking a master calligrapher or fortune-teller to write a character, typically for symbolic or auspicious purposes—as a special way of socializing at that time.

Two music videos were released for these three songs. "Blueprint Supreme" has its own music video, while "Stacks from All Sides" and "Karma Code" has a combined music video in which the first song transitions into the second.

==== Reactions ====
The three songs have gone viral in Western social media, such as TikTok and Instagram Reels, being used as background for clips or memes, with countless spin-offs and remixes. One popular meme referred to as "Dog Singing In Chinese" or "Dog Rapping Skai Isyourgod" begins with the lyrics, "May god bless you with mountains of silver and gold" from his song "Karma Code" (因果), and has received over 10 million views. Apart from the Orientalism, users noted the perceived wisdom in the album that Western discography seems to lack.

The song "Stacks from All Sides" sparked debate over the term "Bielaozai" (Chinese: 憋佬仔), which some interpreted as a derogatory slur. However, the singer clarified that it's a colloquial term for "brother" in certain southern dialects, aiming to convey camaraderie rather than insult, similar to the comparable American slur nigga, which can also imply friendship in certain contexts.

== Artistry ==
Tiffany Ap of Bloomberg described his music as a "mix of Memphis-style rap with Mandarin, Cantonese, and Hakka rhymes." Additionally, he speaks limited English, though he raps entirely in Chinese.

== Discography ==
=== Studio albums ===
No.	Album	Tracks
1	Shun Feng Shun Shui Shun Cai Shen (顺风顺水顺财神): Release date: 10 September 2023; Label: Showstart Release; Format: CD/Digital music download	Tracks: 1. "Yadea"; 2. "Lingdao, Jiaofu" (领导，教父; feat. Clutch); 3. "Guan Er Dai" (官二代; 4. "Hu Tao Ben" (虎头奔); 5. "Jing Shui Lou" (靖水楼); 6. "Sheng Zi Wei Bi Jiu Shi Fu" (生仔未必就是福); 7. "Cha Zhuang" (茶庄)); 8. "Hua Wei Yun Dong Jian Kang Shou Biao" (华为运动健康手表; feat. 8uck); 9. "Wan Zhu Dian Zhan" (湾区电站); 10. "Huo Luo You" (活络油); 11. "A Mo Jiang Fa Cai" (阿嬷讲发财); 12. "Shao Shao Xiang Bai Bai Shen" (烧烧香拜拜神; feat. BroFA）; 13. "Chui Da Shui" (吹大水); 14. "Xi Zhi Jiang Yu Quan" (西枝江鱼庄)
2	Stacks from All Sides (八方来财): Release date: 20 August 2024; Label: Showstart Release, Taihe Music Group; Format: Digital music download	Tracks: 1. "Stacks from All Sides" (Chinese: 八方来财); 2. "Whips and Cribs" (Chinese: 香车豪宅); 3. "Nin Jiom" (Chinese: 念慈菴); 4. "Hexagrams" (Chinese: 六爻); 5. "Blueprint Supreme" (Chinese: 大展宏图; feat. AR）; 6. "Karma Code" (Chinese: 因果); 7. "Rare One" (Chinese: 鹤立鸡群; feat. FAC-D12）; 8. "What Goes Around" (Chinese: 善恶终有报, feat. Bao Bao Gao Xian Sheng (步步高先生), A Niu (阿牛), PlayerJ）; 9. "Green in Drought" (Chinese: 文化沙漠种绿植); 10. "Yao Ji Poker" (Chinese: 姚记); 11. "Swipe That Gas" (Chinese: 加油卡; feat. Dao Jiao (刀脚); 12. "NoFap Protocol" (Chinese: 戒色); 13. "Karaoke Dreams" (Chinese: 卡拉OK; trans. "Karaoke"); 14. "Focus Interview" (Chinese: 焦点访谈); 15. "Lowbrow Prose" (Chinese: 低俗散文; feat. Katastic）; 16. "For the Tribe, For the Culture" (Chinese: 为了部落，为了文化); 17. "Greenbelt Play" (Chinese: 绿化带); 18. "Angel Round Hustle" (Chinese: 社会天使轮); 19. "All In"

=== Extended play ===
No.	Album	Tracks
1	Stacks from All Sides: Fresh Off the Boat (八方来财之江船入海): Release date: 10 July 2025; Label: Independent; Format: Digital music download	Tracks: 1. "Dong Jiang San Hao" (东江三号); 2. "Heng Jiang Er Lu" (横江二路); 3. "Xing Fu Zhe Tui Rang" (幸福者退让); 4. "Ci Shan Jia" (慈善家); 5. "Jiang Ling Hua" (讲令话); 6. "Shang Wu Gan Fa" (商务杆法); 7. "Hua Ban Wen" (花斑蚊); 8. "Xiong Xing Tui San" (凶星退散); 9. "Bad Boy pt.6" (feat. Skai & BroFA)

=== Singles ===
- "Know That"（2020）
- "Wei Er Zheng Cypher" (Chinese: 味儿正Cypher, lit. 'Authentic Cypher', 2021）
- "Bad Boy Doing Good Things pt.2"（feat. BroFA; 2021)
- "Xiao Ying BT Xi Bao" (效应BT细胞, 2021)
- "Bad Boy and Good Thing Pt.3"（feat. BroFA）（2021)
- "Memphis 130" (孟菲斯; 2022)
- "Lan Lao King" (2023)
- "Bay Buy Pt.4"（feat. BroFA; (Note: When Skai ISYOURGOD uploaded this single to the music streaming service, he may have misspelled the word. The single's title should be "Bad Guy Pt.4" instead of "Bay Guy Pt.4". The full name of the song is "Bad Boy Doing Good Things Pt.4", "Bad Boy Doing Good Things" is a series of singles that Skai collaborated with his old friend and rapper BroFA.) 2023)
- "Chui Da Shui" (吹大水; 2023)
- "Yi Yue" (彝粤, feat. 13FlowMic; 2023)
- "Sheng Ke Le" (生可乐; 2023)
- "Tian Ding Lan Li Xing" (天顶揽粒星, 2023)
- "Bad Boy Doing Good Things pt.5" (feat. BroFA, 2024）
- "Qiu Qian" (求签, 2024)
- "Jiang Hu Gui Ju AA Zhi" (江湖规矩AA制, 2024)
- "Lǜ Hua Dai" (绿化带, 2024)
- "Nian Cai Bing" (念财病, feat. Duke Deuce; 2025)
- "No More" (跟悲伤结了账, feat. Gareth.T; 2025)
- "Sweet Luck" (薯你好运, feat. Tia Ray; 2026)
- "Cheng Zhong Cun Zhong Cheng" (城中村中城, 2026)
- "WaiJiaoGuan (Diplomat)" (外交官, feat. Project Pat, 2026)

=== Mixtapes ===
- Skai is Your God No. 1（2022)
