= Chris Lee (Li Yuchun album) =

Studio album by Li Yuchun
- Released: December 22, 2009
- Genre: Mandopop
- Length: 44:27
- Language: Chinese
- Label: Taihe Rye
- Producer: Y.Z. Tan

Li Yuchun chronology
Youth of China (2008)	Chris Lee (2009)	The Literary Youth Who Can Dance (2011)

Chris Lee is the third studio album by Chinese singer Li Yuchun, released on December 22, 2009 by Taihe Rye.

== Track listing ==
No.	Title	Lyrics	Music	Length
1.	"My Love" (阿么)	Li Yuchun	Li Yuchun	4:07
2.	"Let’s Meet at, the Next, Crossing" (下个, 路口, 见)	Li Yuchun	Li Yuchun	3:30
3.	"Frequent Flyer" (常旅客)	Li Yuchun	Li Yuchun	4:45
4.	"Piece by Piece" (一点一点)	Li Yuchun	Li Yuchun	4:15
5.	"The Pedals" (脚踏板)	Li Yuchun	Li Yuchun	4:03
6.	"Little Kid" (小朋友)	Li Yuchun	Li Yuchun	3:25
7.	"The Little Universe" (小宇宙)	Li Yuchun	Yan dandan, Mr. L	3:46
8.	"Seeking Everywhere" (千域千寻)	Zhao Jianuo	Li Yuchun	4:09
9.	"Serve It Right" (活该)	Li Yuchun	Drew Peters, Chris Peters	3:35
10.	"Live" (籁赋)	Li Yuchun	Li Yuchun	3:51
11.	"At Least You Have Me" (还有我疼你)	L.T.	L.T.	5:21
Total length:				44:27

== Music videos ==
1. Let’s Meet at, the Next, Crossing 下个, 路口, 见
2. Little Kid 小朋友
3. Amo 阿么
4. At Least You Have Me 还有我疼你
