= Huizhou Daya Bay Economic and Technological Development Zone =

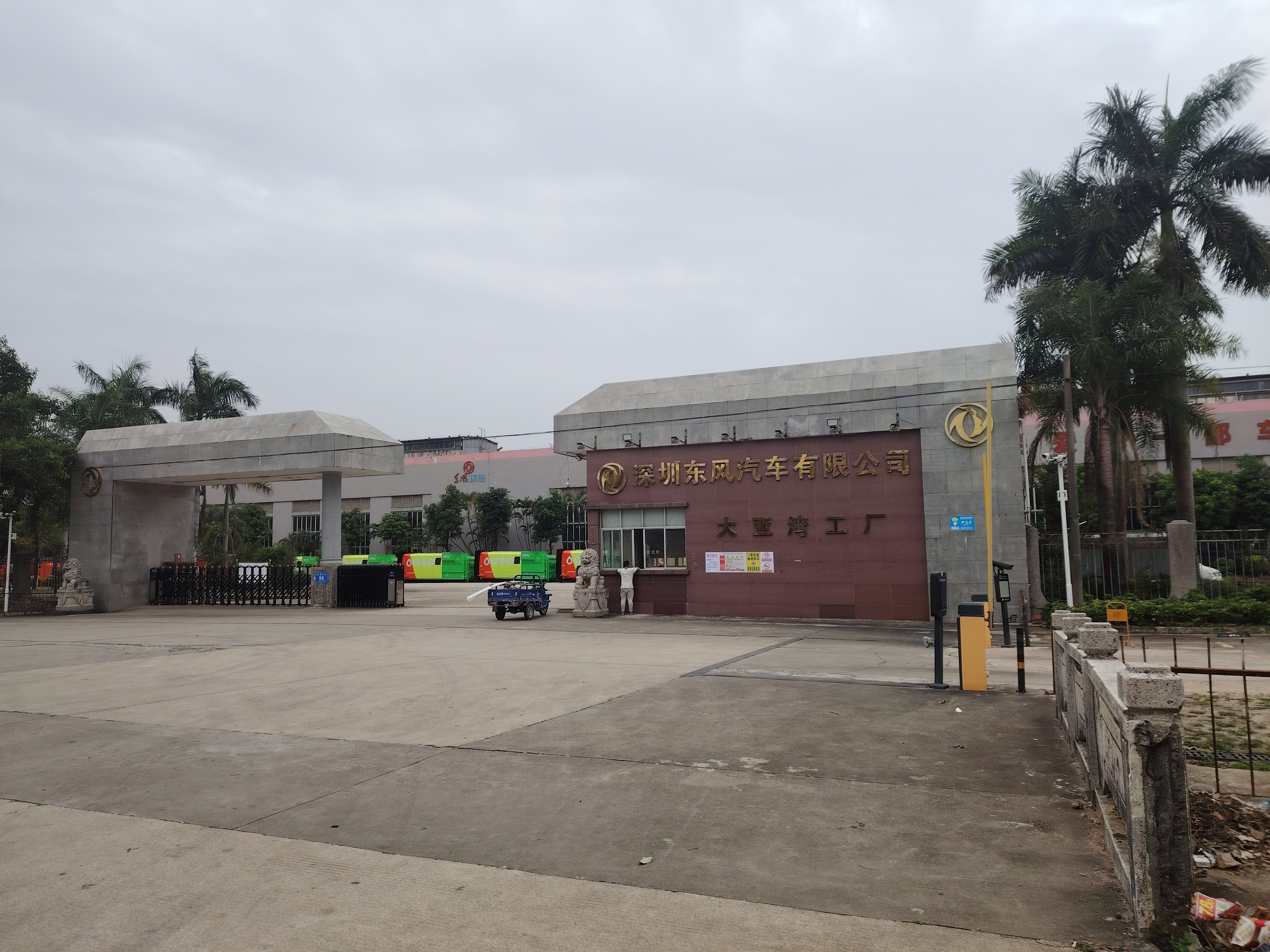
Shenzhen Dongfeng Motor Huizhou Daya Bay Plant

Huizhou Daya Bay Economic and Technological Development Zone (Chinese: 惠州大亚湾经济技术开发区) is state-level economic development zone in 1993. The zone has a developed area of 6.98 square kilometres. It is situated in the north-eastern part of Daya Bay, located in Huizhou, Guangdong, facing the South China Sea and Shenzhen. The pillar industries include electronic and information, metals, energy, paper, petrochemical and warehousing.

== Link ==
- Huizhou Daya Bay Economic and Technological Development Zone (Chinese Version)
