= Huizhou West railway station =

Railway station in Guangdong Province, China

Coordinates: 23.0924°N 114.3627°E

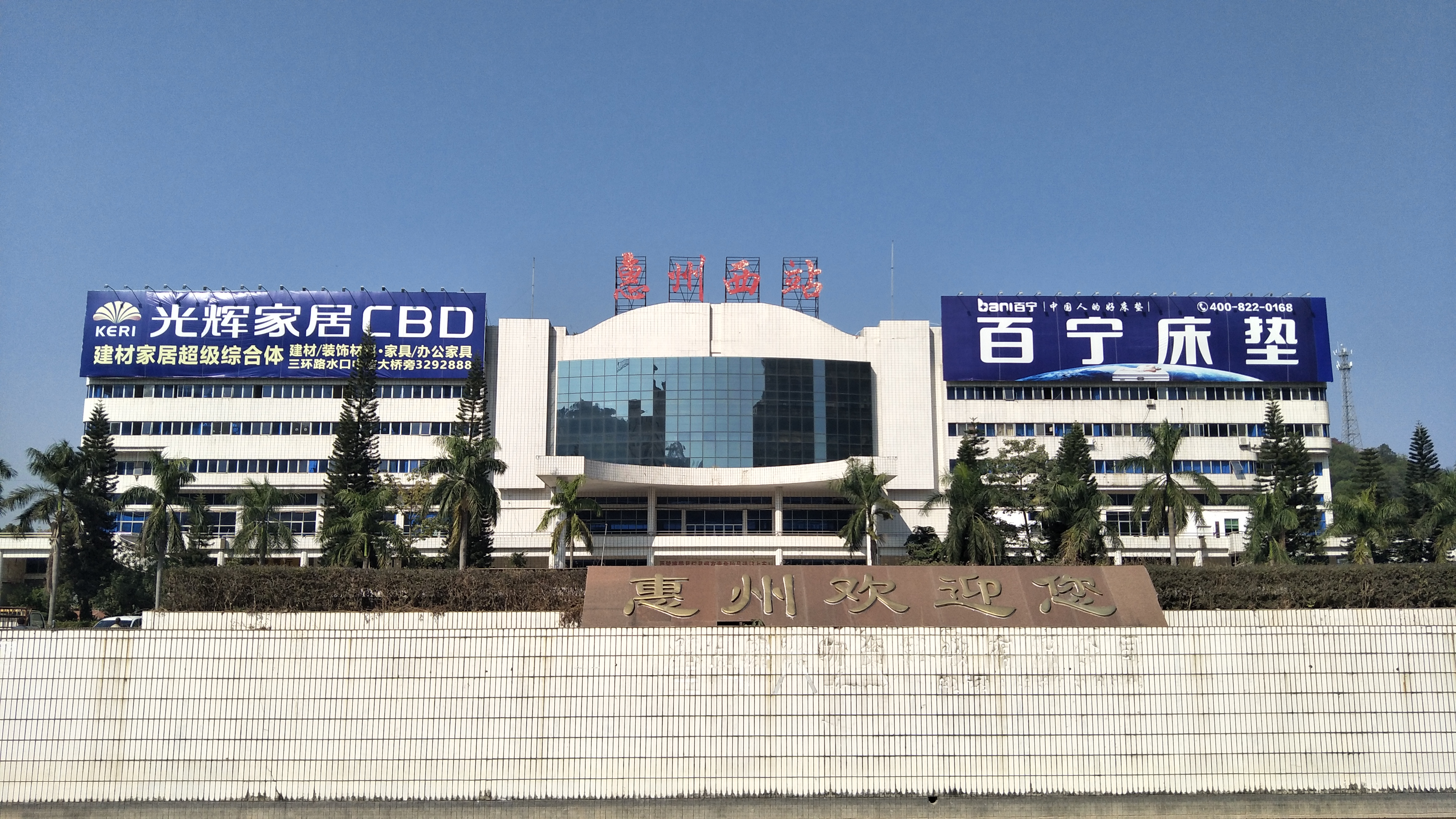
Huizhou West Railway Station

Huizhou West railway station (Chinese: 惠州西站) on the Beijing–Kowloon railway and Huizhou–Dayawan railway. It is located in Huicheng District, Huizhou, Guangdong Province, China.

The station is relatively remote when compared to those on the more modern Dongguan–Huizhou intercity railway. In December 2017, the limited passenger service was removed.

The Huizhou–Dayawan railway departs from Beijing–Kowloon railway immediately east of this station.

Preceding station	China Railway	Following station
Huizhou towards Beijing West	Beijing–Kowloon railway	Dongguan East towards Hung Hom
