= The Queen and the Dreams =

Studio album by Li Yuchun
- Released: September 15, 2006
- Genre: Mandopop
- Length: 43:28
- Label: Taihe Rye
- Producer: Zhang Yadong

Li Yuchun chronology
The Special Greeting for Chris' Birthday (2006)	The Queen and the Dreams (2006)	Mine (2007)

The Queen and the Dreams (simplified Chinese: 皇后与梦想; traditional Chinese: 皇后與夢想) is the first studio album of Chinese singer Li Yuchun, released on September 15, 2006, by Taihe Rye.

== Track listing ==
No.	Title	Lyrics	Music	Length
1.	"The Queen and the Dreams" (皇后与梦想)	Crystal Zhang	Zhang Yadong	4:05
2.	"Dance" (舞)	Zhang Nan	Liyan Nuniz, Roldan Gonzaliz	3:38
3.	"Loving"	Joey Ji	Zhang Yadong	4:22
4.	"Raining" (下雨)	Li Bin	Mo Yanlin	4:20
5.	"Kulala"	Future Bicycle	Future Bicycle	3:24
6.	"Chris Lee"	Ding Ding	Ding Ding, Xu Bojie	3:23
7.	"Waiting" (等)	Li Bin	Mo Yanlin	3:52
8.	"Want to Cry"	Li Bin	Mo Yanlin	3:34
9.	"Half a Mile" (0.5英里)	Joey Ji	Zhang Yadong	4:01
10.	"Happy Wake Up"	Wen Ya	Zhang Yadong	3:57
11.	"Ice Chrysanthemum Story" (冰菊物语)	Crystal Zhang	Zhang Yadong	4:52
Total length:				43:28

== Music videos ==
1. Loving
2. Happy Wake Up
3. Raining
4. Ice Chrysanthemum Story
