= No More (Gareth. T song) =

Single by Gareth.T and 揽佬SKAI ISYOURGOD
- Language: Mandarin Chinese
- Released: 23 October 2025
- Genre: Hip-hop; Rap
- Length: 3:03
- Label: Warner Music Hong Kong
- Songwriters: Gareth. T; 揽佬SKAI ISYOURGOD
- Producers: Gareth. T; 揽佬SKAI ISYOURGOD; Big Spoon; Patrick Yip; Jacking

Gareth.T singles chronology
"thanos" (2025)	"No More" (2025)

揽佬SKAI ISYOURGOD singles chronology
"Blueprint Supreme" (2025)	"No More" (2025)

Music video
- "No More" on YouTube

"No More" (Chinese: 跟悲傷結了帳) is a song by Hong Kong singer Gareth.T and Chinese singer 揽佬SKAI ISYOURGOD.

== Music video ==
The music video was premiered on YouTube on October 30, 2025. It details Gareth. T's journey from signing up to a basketball camp, ascending up to heaven and ending up in a prison.

== Personnel ==
All credits adapted from Apple Music.

Musicians

- Gareth. T – Vocals
- 揽佬SKAI ISYOURGOD – Rap
- International Master Philharmonic Orchestra – Strings

Technical

- Gareth. T – Arranger, composer, lyrics, producer, recording engineer
- 揽佬SKAI ISYOURGOD – Arranger, composer, lyrics, producer
- Big Spoon – Composer, arranger, producer
- Patrick Yip – Arranger, composer, producer, recording engineer
- Jacking – Arranger, producer
- Gab de Leon – Arranger
- Matthew Sim – Immersive Mixing Engineer
- Chenghan Liu – Mixing Engineer
- Mountain Hui – Recording Engineer
- Chris Gehringer – Mastering Engineer
- Alex Psaroudakis – Immersive Mastering Engineer

== Reception ==
When released, it was hit with mixed reviews, with some people asking whether they both have stumbled into the wrong studio. Marcus Aurelius from LiFTED Asia said that: "Gareth.T ballad with SKAI dropping in like a soulful uncle with the ad-libs." Adding that: "the contrast between Gareth.T’s tenderness and SKAI’s bassy interjections starts to feel intentional and it is something oddly satisfying and new."

== Charts ==
Weekly chart performance for "No More"
Chart (2025)	Peak position
Malaysia (Top 10 Chinese Singles)	1
Hong Kong (Billboard)	1
Official Malaysia Chinese Chart (IFPI)	1
