= Zeng Jingsheng =

Chinese oil painter (born 1954)

- Born: August 20, 1954 (age 72); Huizhou, Guangdong, China
- Education: Undergraduate
- Alma mater: Shenzhen University
- Known for: Oil painting creation
- Notable work: 0621 Zone; Girls in Russia; The Past; Distant Wind; Rice
- Style: Realistically
- Awards: Excellence Award – 2018 Asian Art Biennale (Hongkong); 2018 Girls in Russia - Sasha – Author; Bronze Award – 2015 Asian Art Biennale (Hongkong); 2015 Warm Spring – Author; Gold Award – The Fourteenth China Art Fair; 2007 The Sunshine of Western Region - 3 – Author; Excellence Award – Art Works Exhibition in Guangdong; 1989 Rice – Author
- Elected: Vice chairman of the Shenzhen Artists Association (fourth session); Vice chairman of the Shenzhen Artists Association (fifth session); Advisor to the Shenzhen Artists Association

Zeng Jingsheng (Chinese: 曾景生; born August 20, 1954) is a Chinese oil painter. He was born in Huizhou, Guangdong. He is a member of the China Artists Association. He has been vice chairman of the Shenzhen Artists Association.

In 1984, Zeng was admitted to the Guangdong Artists Association. In 1990, he was admitted to the Chinese Artists Association. He was the first artist from Shenzhen to be admitted to the Chinese Artists Association.

== Work of art ==
Date	Title	Title (translate)	Type
Unknown	月亮跟着我们走	The moon follows us	Acrylic painting
Unknown	思	Thinking	Oil painting
Unknown	邓小平视察渔民村	Deng Xiaoping inspected the fisherman's Village	Oil painting
1980	打字员	A Typist	Unknown
1986	往事	Past	Oil painting
1989	米	Rice	Oil painting
1982	午餐	Lunch	Oil painting
1982	晌午	Noon	Oil painting
1986	语	Speak	Oil painting
1987	远方的风	The Wind in The Distance	Oil painting
1993	曾景生油画集	Album of Oil Paintings by Zeng Jing Sheng	Picture album
2005	江泽民同志视察深圳	Comrade Jiang Zemin inspected Shenzhen	Oil painting
2006	春 / 春天的故事	Spring / The Story of Spring	Oil painting
2007	客家风情	The touching of the Hakka	Oil painting
2009	西域的阳光	The Sunshine of Western Region	Oil painting
2010	高原深秋	The plateau in late autumn	Oil painting
2010	牧歌	Eclogue	Oil painting
2012	葡萄熟了	The grapes are ripe	Oil painting
2013	江南四月	South of the Yangtze River in April	Oil painting
2013	0621空间	0621 Zone	Oil painting
2014	俄罗斯姑娘	Girls in Russia	Oil painting
2015	暖阳	Warm Spring	Oil painting

== Exhibition ==
Date	Exhibition	Sponsor	Works on display at an exhibition	Place
1980	Exhibition of young art works			China Guangdong
2003	The Exhibition of Six Artists from The Early Stage of Artists in Shenzhen	深圳美术馆(China Shenzhen Art Museum)		China Shenzhen
2005	Charismatic Shenzhen, Shenzhen painter Image Exhibition	深圳美术馆(China Shenzhen Art Museum)		China Shenzhen
2006	Commemorating the founding of the China Democratic Alliance 65th anniversary, the 60th anniversary exhibition of fine arts and calligraphy by the Guangdong Democratic League organization	雅昌艺术馆(China Artron Art Gallery)		China Shenzhen
2007	The Fourteenth China Art Fair		"The Sunshine of Western Region - 3"	China Beijing
2011	Sixteen Chinese Calligraphers and Paintings Exhibition	阿拉伯联合酋长国迪拜文化科技交流协会中心(Arabia United Arab Emirates cultural and Technological Exchange Association Center, Dubai)		Dubai
2014	Zeng Jingsheng Oil Painting Exhibition	Shenzhen Federation of Literary And Art Circles, Sflac and Shenzhen Publication & Distribution Group		China Shenzhen
2014	Ten Old Painters Artists' Exhibition of Shenzhen	深圳美术馆(China Shenzhen Art Museum)		China Shenzhen
2015	"New line of vision" exhibition of artists from China Democratic League	罗湖美术馆(China Shenzhen Luohu Art Museum)		China Shenzhen
2017	Chinese dream, hometown feeling—Exhibition of home and abroad oil painters return home works	惠州报业传媒集团全媒体产业基地裙楼一楼展厅(Huizhou press media group, Chinese Traditional Painting Academy, Shenzhen Artists Association, Huizhou Artists Association)	"0621 Zone - 01", "0621 Zone - 03"	China Huizhou
2017	"The Alliance of the Art" The exhibition of the works of the Shenzhen Democratic League of artists	深圳艺廊(China Shenzhen YiLang)	"Girls in Russia - Sasha"	China Shenzhen
2018	2018 Asian Art Biennale (Hongkong)		"Girls in Russia - Sasha"	China Hongkong
2018	2018 Shenzhen oil painting annual exhibition	Shenzhen Artists Association, Shenzhen Art Museum	"0621 Zone - 03"	China Shenzhen
