= The Special Greeting for Chris' Birthday =

EP by Li Yuchun
- Released: March 10, 2006
- Genre: Mandopop
- Label: Taihe Rye

Li Yuchun chronology
The Special Greeting for Chris' Birthday (2006)	The Queen and the Dreams (2006)

The Special Greeting for Chris' Birthday (Chinese: 宇你在一起) is the debut EP by Chinese singer Li Yuchun, released on March 10, 2006 by Taihe Rye.

== Track listing ==
No.	Title	Length
1.	"Give Me Five"	3:57
2.	"Give Me Five" (DJ Hunter Remix)	3:22
3.	"Happy Winter" (冬天快乐)	4:41
4.	"Give Me Five" (Instrumental)	3:56
5.	"Happy Winter" (Instrumental)	4:38

VCD
No.	Title	Length
1.	"Happy Winter" (Music video)

== Music videos ==
- Happy Winter
