= Youth of China (EP) =

Studio album by Li Yuchun
- Released: April 29, 2008
- Genre: Mandopop
- Length: 26:44
- Language: Chinese
- Label: Taihe Rye
- Producer: Tan Yizhe

Li Yuchun chronology
Mine (2007)	Youth of China (2008)	Chris Lee (2009)

Youth of China (simplified Chinese: 少年中国; traditional Chinese: 少年中國) is the second EP by Chinese singer Li Yuchun, released on April 29, 2008 by Taihe Rye.

== Track listing ==
No.	Title	Lyrics	Music	Length
1.	"Youth of China" (少年中国)	Ji Chuchen	KENT	4:45
2.	"Poor Student" (Cha Sheng)	Li Yuchun, Zhang Yefan	Zhang Yefan	5:10
3.	"Xiucai Hutong" (秀才胡同)	Chu Chen Ji	Tan Yizhe	4:52
4.	"I Am Your XX (2008 version)" (我是你的XX)	Ye Xiao	Ye Xiao	3:44
5.	"Hua Rong Shou" (花容瘦)	JNeL.	JNeL.	3:48
6.	"HNTV (Bonus track)"	Wang Jian	KENT	4:25
Total length:				26:44

== Music videos ==
1. Xiucai Hutong 秀才胡同
2. Youth of China 少年中国
3. Poor Student 差生
