= Mine (Li Yuchun album) =

Studio album by Li Yuchun
- Released: November 2, 2007
- Genre: Mandopop
- Length: 42:56
- Label: Taihe Rye
- Producer: Zhang Yadong, Schellaburgh, Rockstein, Simon Perry

Li Yuchun chronology
The Queen and the Dreams (2006)	Mine (2007)	Youth of China (2008)

Mine (Chinese: 我的) is the second studio album of Chinese singer Li Yuchun, released on November 2, 2007 by Taihe Rye. The album was re-released in 2008 to celebrate Chinese New Year.

== Track listing ==
Chinese song titles in the notes field

Standard edition
No.	Title	Lyrics	Music	Length
1.	"My Kingdom" (我的王国)	Zhang Nan; Kevin Yi	Jonas Jeberg; Anders Bagge; Kenisha Pratt	3:52
2.	"Me" (我)	Zhang Nan	Simon Perry; Niklas Pettersson; Keith Beauvais; Aron Friedman; Dave Thomas	3:35
3.	"Floating Subway" (漂浮地铁)	Kevin Yi	Simon Perry; Niklas Pettersson; Mikael Albertsson	3:50
4.	"Stop"	Wang Haitao	Ina Wroldsen Andre Lindal; Geir Hvidtsten; Amund Bjorklund; Espen Lind	3:29
5.	"Happy Hour"	Crystal Zhang	Jonas Jeberg; Negin	3:14
6.	"My 88 Friends" (我的88个朋友)	Kevin Yi	Xiao Shan; Lin Hai	3:35
7.	"My Black and White Color" (我的黑白色)	Kevin Yi	M-brothers	5:02
8.	"Dance over Pampas" (潘帕斯之舞)	3 Days Before	3 Days Before	4:05
9.	"12 Love Words" (爱的12句)	Kevin Yi	Zhang Yadong	3:42
10.	"Over It"	Wang Haitao	Ina Wroldsen Andre Lindal; Geir Hvidtsten; Amund Bjorklund; Espen Lind	4:02
11.	"My Kongfu" (我的功夫)	Su Shanna	Li Ai	4:30
Total length:				42:56

== Music videos ==
1. My Kingdom
2. Floating Subway
3. Stop
