= Huizhou–Dayawan railway =

Railway line in Guangdong, China

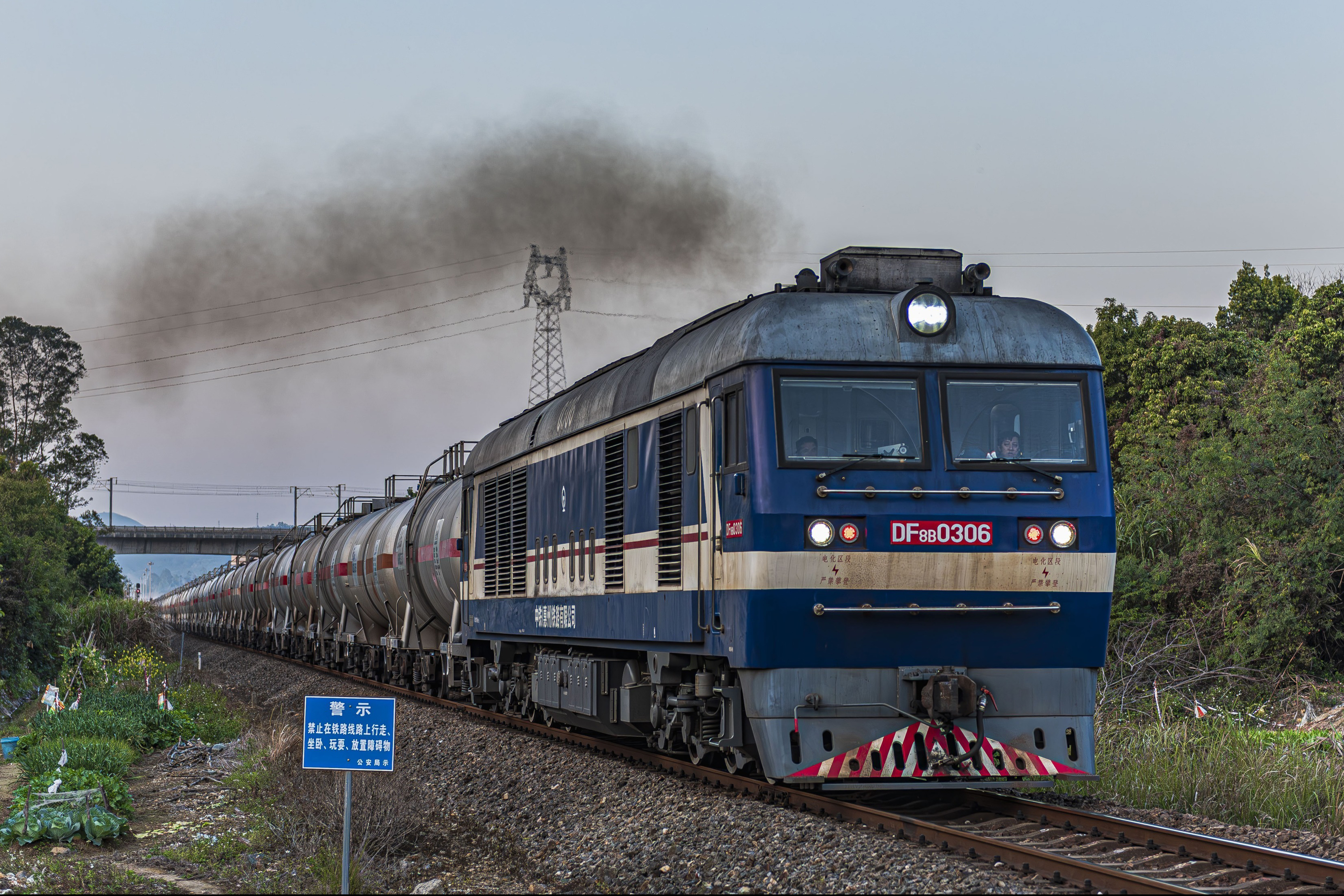

Overview
- Native name: 惠大铁路
- Status: Operational
- Locale: Huizhou, Guangdong, China
- Termini: Huizhou West; Chunzhou
- Stations: 6

Service
- Type: Heavy rail

History
- Opened: January 2004 (Huizhou West-Dayawan)

Technical
- Track gauge: 1,435 mm (4 ft 8 1/2 in) standard gauge

The Huizhou–Dayawan railway or Huida railway (Chinese: 惠大铁路; pinyin: Huìdà Tiělù) is a single-track freight-only railway line located in Huizhou, Guangdong, China.

== History ==
The railway was opened from Huizhou West to Dayawan in January 2004, following 11 years of construction.

Work to extend the railway to the Huizhou Port had already started in December 2003. The one-station extension to Huizhou Port opened in December 2009.

A 1.87 kilometres (1.16 mi) long branch connecting the Quanwan coal terminal was opened with the terminal on 1 November 2018. The station at the Quanwan coal terminal is named Chunzhou.

== Stations ==
- Huizhou West (惠州西)
- Huihuan West (惠环西)
- Huiyang East (惠阳东)
- Dayawan (大亚湾)
- Huizhou Port (惠州港)
- Chunzhou (纯洲)

== Route ==
The line leaves the Beijing–Kowloon railway west of Huizhou West railway station in Huicheng District and heads south, through Huiyang District, to Dayawan railway station. The line then splits into multiple branches which terminate at the coast.

== Future Development ==
There are proposals to electrify the railway, add a second track, and operate passenger services.
