= Li Yuchun =

Chinese singer and actress

Chris Lee
- 李宇春
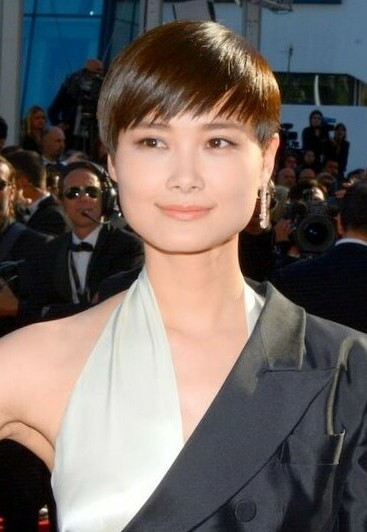
- Li at the Cannes Film Festival in 2015
- Born: Li Yuchun; March 10, 1984 (age 42); Chengdu, Sichuan, China
- Education: Sichuan Conservatory of Music
- Occupations: Singer, songwriter, actress
- Years active: 2005–present
- Agent(s): EE Media, Li Yuchun Studio
- Musical career
- Also known as: Chris Lee
- Origin: China
- Genres: Mandopop
- Instruments: Vocals, piano, guitar, drum
- Label: Yellow Stone

Chinese name
- Chinese: 李宇春
Transcriptions
Standard Mandarin
- Hanyu Pinyin: Lǐ Yǔchūn
Yue: Cantonese
- Jyutping: Lei5 Jyu5 Ceon1

Li Yuchun (Chinese: 李宇春; pinyin: Lǐ Yǔchūn; born March 10, 1984), also known by her stage name Chris Lee, is a Chinese singer, songwriter, DJ and actress. Her musical style is mainly based on electronic dance music and Chinese pop songs. She launched her singing career by winning first place in the Chinese singing contest Super Girl, in 2005. The following year, she released her debut album The Queen and the Dreams. Referred to as the mother of the unisex look in China, she has achieved mainstream success.

== Early life and career ==
=== 1984–2005: Early years and career beginnings ===
Li was born in Chengdu, Sichuan, China on March 10, 1984. Her father was a railroad police officer, while her mother was a teacher. After she finished her high school studies at Xindu No.1 Middle School, Li attended the Sichuan Conservatory of Music in 2002. In 2005, Li won the championship in the Chinese singing contest Super Girl.

=== 2005–2009: Taihe Rye Music ===
In 2005, Li released a few singles, including "Merry Christmas", "Give Me Five", and "Happy Wake Up". After signing with Chinese record label Taihe Rye, Li started to make her debut album, The Queen and the Dreams, which was released in September 2006. In the same month, Li held her first solo concert in Beijing. In the same year, Li collaborated with Chinese band The Catcher in the Rye to release a charity song titled "Green". In November 2007, Li released her second studio album, Mine, and embarked her first concert tour Mine Tour. In April 2008, Li released an extended plays titled Youth of China. In the same year, she won an MTV Asia Award for Favorite Artist Mainland China, and performed in Asia Song Festival in Seoul. In June 2009, Li collaborated with Chinese writer Guo Jingming to release a song titled "Shu Embroidery". In April 2009, Li featured in the Chinese film, Bodyguards and Assassins, and was nominated two Hong Kong Film Awards for Best New Performer and Best Supporting Actress. She also sang the theme song, "Dust", which was nominated a Hong Kong Film Award for Best Original Film Song. In August 2009, Li released her third studio album, Chris Lee.

=== 2011–2015: EE Media ===
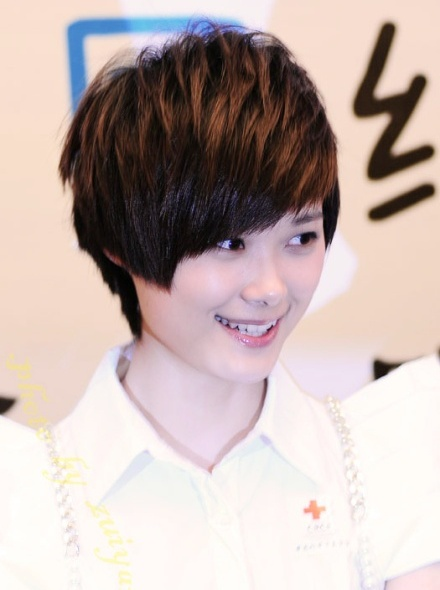
Li at her Fans Charity Fund in 2011

In April 2011, Li released her fourth studio album, The Literary Youth Who Can Dance, in which most of the songs are produced by herself. In the same year, Li featured in the Chinese film, Flying Swords of Dragon Gate. In 2012, Li released her fifth studio album, Old If Not Wild. In the same year, she embarked her second concert tour Crazy World Tour. In the same year, she featured in the Chinese film, The Guillotines. In the same year, she won an Mnet Asian Music Award for Best Asian Artist. In July 2013, Li became one of the judges of Chinese singing contest Super Boy of the year. In the same year, she won an MTV Europe Music Award for Best Worldwide Act. In 2014, Li released her sixth studio album, A Magical Encounter 1987. In the same year, she won a World Music Award for Best Selling Chinese Artist.

=== 2015–present: Yellow Stone ===
Li stars in Givenchy's Autumn/Winter 2015 campaign by Riccardo Tisci and picked as One of Business of Fashion's 500 Global Fashion Leaders in 2015.

Li was announced the ambassador for Gucci Timepieces and Jewelry in Asia in Jun 2016. In the same year, Li released her seventh studio album, Growing Wild. Li broke with tradition by separating the new album into four EPs. She invited producers she had never worked with before, like Hsia Yu, Wyman Wong and Chen Weilun. The first EP, Wild, sold 3 million copies in 16 days after it was released in May of last year. The three other EPs were then released within six months, with total sales of more than 6.5 million copies, grossing over 32.8 million yuan ($4.73 million) in 2016. According to Andy Wai Lam Ng, the vice-president of Tencent Music Entertainment Group, Growing Wild achieved China's highest digital music sales since the company released the first Chinese digital album in December 2014. Li Yuchun became the most popular singer in 2016 on Toutiao, China's major news and information app for mobile devices, which daily attracts about 1.27 billion clicks on Videos, and 230 million of them are relevant to entertainment. In support of the new album, she embarked on her third concert tour Growing Wild Tour. In the same year, she featured in the Chinese film, From Vegas to Macau III. She also featured in the Chinese film, Monster Hunt 2, which was released in February 2018. In 2021, Li participated in the third season of the Chinese idol group survival show Youth with You as the main host of the show, referred to as the Youth PD.

== Public image ==
Li's distinct visual effect and costume style has received global acclaim.

== Philanthropy ==
In 2006, China Red Cross Foundation founded a special purpose fund titled Yumi Love Fund with the help of Li and her fans. As of March 2011, the fund received donation of more than 7 million Chinese yuan from over 40,000 people. The funds raised were used to cover the medical expenses for 33 children with critical illness, and the construction of five clinics in Anhui, Sichuan, Gansu, Henan. In 2010, the fund allocated 500,000 Chinese yuan to relieve the people in the disaster of 2010 China drought and dust storms, and allocated 1 million Chinese yuan to relieve the people in the disaster of 2010 Yushu earthquake. In 2011, the fund allocated 420,000 Chinese yuan to help 30 hearing-impaired children having rehabilitation.

== Discography ==
=== Studio albums ===
- The Queen and the Dreams (2006)
- Mine (2007)
- Chris Lee (2009)
- The Literary Youth Who Can Dance (2011)
- Old If Not Wild (2012)
- A Magical Encounter 1987 (2014)
- Growing Wild (2016)
- Liu Xing (2017)
- Wow (2019)
- Have a Nice Weekend (週末愉快) (2023)

=== Extended plays ===
- The Special Greeting for Chris' Birthday (2006)
- Youth of China (2008)

=== Compilation albums ===
- N+1 Evolution (2008)

== Filmography ==
=== Feature films ===
- Bodyguards and Assassins (2009)
- Prologue (2010)
- Flying Swords of Dragon Gate (2011)
- The Guillotines (2012)
- From Vegas to Macau III (2016)
- See You Tomorrow (2016)
- Monster Hunt 2 (2018)

=== Theatrical plays ===
- A Dream Like a Dream (2013–2014)

=== Television ===
- Youth With You 3 (2021)

== Tours ==
- Mine Tour (2007)
- Crazy World Tour (2012)
- Growing Wild Tour (2016)
- Liu Xing Tour (2018)

== Awards ==
Year	Awards	Category	Result	Ref.
2008	MTV Asia Awards	Favorite Artist Mainland China	Won	
2012	Mnet Asian Music Awards	Best Asian Artist	Won	
2013	MTV Europe Music Awards	Best Worldwide Act	Won	
2014	World Music Awards	Best Selling Chinese Artist	Won	
