= Old If Not Wild =

Studio album by Li Yuchun
- Released: September 4, 2012
- Genre: Mandopop
- Length: 40:00
- Language: Chinese
- Label: EE Media
- Producer: Y.Z. Tan

Li Yuchun chronology
The Literary Youth Who Can Dance (2011)	Old If Not Wild (2012)	A Magical Encounter 1987 (2014)

Old If Not Wild (simplified Chinese: 再不疯狂我们就老了; traditional Chinese: 再不瘋狂我們就老了) is the fifth studio album by Chinese singer Li Yuchun, released on September 4, 2012, by EE Media.

== Track listing ==
No.	Title	Lyrics	Music	Length
1.	"Burning Life" (似火年华)	Han Han	Li Yuchun	4:27
2.	"Deaf" (聋子)	Lin Xi	Keith Chan Fai-young	4:01
3.	"Moon on the Sea" (海上的月亮)	Li Yuchun	Guo Jiaming	4:24
4.	"Thanks for Affecting Me" (感谢你感动我)	Lin Xi	Keith Chan Fai-young	3:37
5.	"Lifeline" (生命线)	Li Yuchun	Long Zhe	3:31
6.	"Hello Baby"	Lin Xi	Lee Hyeon Wook	3:22
7.	"At That Moment" (当时)	Li Yuchun	Wee Wan	4:48
8.	"Say Goodbye"	Li Yuchun	Li Yuchun	3:56
9.	"Forbidden" (禁界)	Li Yuchun	La. Quang, Ole Dreyer Wogensen	3:38
10.	"Old If Not Wild" (再不疯狂我们就老了)	Li Yuchun	Li Yuchun	4:06
Total length:				40:00

== Music videos ==
1. Burning Life 似火年华
2. Hello Baby
3. Old If Not Wild 再不疯狂我们就老了
4. Deaf 聋子
