= The Literary Youth Who Can Dance =

The Literary Youth Who Can Dance 会跳舞的文艺青年

Studio album by Li Yuchun
- Released: April 12, 2011
- Genre: Mandopop
- Length: 38:27
- Language: Chinese
- Label: EE Media
- Producer: Song Yubin, Y.Z. Tan

Li Yuchun chronology
Chris Lee (2009)	The Literary Youth Who Can Dance 会跳舞的文艺青年 (2011)	Old If Not Wild (2012)

The Literary Youth Who Can Dance (simplified Chinese: 会跳舞的文艺青年; traditional Chinese: 會跳舞的文藝青年) is the fourth studio album by Chinese singer Li Yuchun, released on April 12, 2011 by EE Media.

== Track listing ==
No.	Title	Lyrics	Music	Length
1.	"The Literary Youth Who Can Dance" (会跳舞的文艺青年)	Li Yuchun	Li Yuchun	4:42
2.	"I'm Sorry But Suddenly Miss You" (对不起﹐只是忽然很想你)	Li Yuchun	Kim Se Jin * Seo Jung Jin	3:57
3.	"I Sing La La La" (我唱啦啦啦)	Wu Mengru	Thomas Echart* Inga Humpe * Daniel Barth	3:57
4.	"Lost Heart Crazy" (失心疯)	Li Yuchun	Li Yuchun	4:13
5.	"Drowning Fish" (淹死的鱼)	Li Yuchun	Yu Heng	4:25
6.	"Street Corner" (街角)	Jiang Yixuan	Thomas Echart, Inga Humpe, Peter Plate, Ulf Leo Sommer	3:32
7.	"Little Clever Dance" (小聪明舞曲)	Crowd Lu	Crowd Lu	3:55
8.	"Deep in the Play" (入戏)	Y.Z. Tan	Y.Z. Tan	4:09
9.	"Planless Trip" (没有计划的旅行)	Wu Mengru	Li Yuchun	3:48
10.	"My Love"	Anders Lee	Chan Kwong-wing	1:49
Total length:				38:27

== Music videos ==
1. I Sing La La La 我唱啦啦啦
2. I'm Sorry But Suddenly Miss You 对不起﹐只是忽然很想你
3. The Literary Youth Who Can Dance 会跳舞的文艺青年
4. Lost Heart Crazy 失心疯
