= A Magical Encounter 1987 =

Studio album by Li Yuchun
- Released: July 30, 2014
- Length: 40:43
- Label: EE Media
- Producer: Zhang Yadong

Li Yuchun chronology
Old If Not Wild (2012)	A Magical Encounter 1987 (2014)	Growing Wild (2016)

A Magical Encounter 1987 (simplified Chinese: 1987我不知会遇见你; traditional Chinese: 1987我不知會遇見你) is the sixth studio album by Li Yuchun, released on July 30, 2014 by EE Media.

== Track listing ==
No.	Title	Lyrics	Music	Length
1.	"Dance to the Music"	Li Yuchun	Zhang Yadong	3:35
2.	"The Goddness Bible" (女神經)	Li Yuchun	Nick Pyo	3:18
3.	"A Magical Encounter 1987 " (1987我不知会遇见你)	Li Yuchun	KELZIE	5:18
4.	"What Is" (什么)	Chow Yiu Fai	Hanjin Tan	3:58
5.	"Beyond" (超)	Chow Yiu Fai	Hanjin Tan, Kelvin Avon	4:15
6.	"This Unfeeling World" (冷暖)	Li Yuchun	Zheng Nan	3:45
7.	"Cool" (酷)	Lin Xi	Li Yuchun	4:11
8.	"Rock Heart"	Li Yuchun	Wang Chao	4:43
9.	"Play Your Solo" (弹你的Solo)	Zhang Yadong	Zhang Yadong	3:57
10.	"Stay Gold" (如初)	Tao Chen	Zhang Yadong	3:43
Total length:				40:43
