= Growing Wild =

Studio album by Li Yuchun
- Released: November 2016
- Genre: Mandopop
- Language: Chinese
- Label: Yellow Stone

Li Yuchun chronology
A Magical Encounter 1987 (2014)	Growing Wild (2016)	Liu Xing (2017)

Growing Wild (simplified Chinese: 野蛮生长; traditional Chinese: 野蠻生長) is the seventh studio album by Chinese singer Li Yuchun, released in November 2016 by Yellow Stone. Instead of releasing twelve songs at one time, the album was separated into four EPs, and sold more than 6.5 million copies.

== Track listing ==
EP1 "野"
No.	Title	Lyrics	Music	Length
1.	"Sense of Presence" (存在感)	Hsia Yu	Chen Weilun	3:04
2.	"Open Up" (开放)	Chow Yiu Fai	Erika Nuri Taylor; Andrew Love; Alex Geringas; Chris Lennertz	2:51
3.	"So What" (那又怎样)	Li Yuchun	Li Yuchun	3:43

EP2 "蛮"
No.	Title	Lyrics	Music	Length
1.	"As If" (若)	Song Tao	Song Tao	3:55
2.	"Blue" (蓝)	Li Yuchun	Li Yuchun	3:58
3.	"Magical Show"	Li Yuchun	Urban Cla6ix; Zheng Nan	3:25

EP3 "生"
No.	Title	Lyrics	Music	Length
1.	"Fig" (无花果)	Hsia Yu	Chen Weilun; Li Yuchun	5:25
2.	"Reasonable Sorrow" (合理哀伤)	Wyman Wong	Song Tao	4:29
3.	"Give My Jacket to Me" (夹克还我)	Chow Yiu Fai	Urban Cla6ix	3:42

EP4 "长"
No.	Title	Lyrics	Music	Length
1.	"Ximen Youth" (西门少年)	Li Yuchun	Li Yuchun	4:30
2.	"God Answers" (神回复)	Hsia Yu	Chen Xiaoxia	4:29
3.	"Growing Wild" (野蛮生长)	Wyman Wong	Urban Cla6ix (Park Junsu/ Jung Yeonhun); Zheng Nan	3:35

== Music videos ==
1. Sense of Presence 存在感
2. Open up 开放
3. As If 若
4. Fig 无花果
5. Ximen Youth 西门少年

== Tour ==
Growing Wild Tour (simplified Chinese: 野蛮生长巡回演唱会; traditional Chinese: 野蠻生長巡回演唱會) is the third concert tour by Chinese singer Li Yuchun, in support of her seventh studio album, Growing Wild (2016). The tour embarked on August 20, 2016, in Beijing and concluded on December 10, 2016, in Chongqing. The tour visited five cities of China and sold more than 50,000 tickets.
