= Huizhou Nanshan School =

Private school in Guangdong Province, China

Coordinates: 23.0558°N 114.4124°E

Huizhou Nanshan School (HNS, Chinese: Chinese:惠州南山学校; pinyin: Huìzhōu Nánshān Xuéxiào), formerly called Huizhou First Secondary School Nanshan School (HFSSNS), is a Chinese private primary and secondary school partly subsidized by the government. The school is in the Huicheng District of Huizhou City, Guangdong Province, China.

HNS was the only private school graded as meeting the "first-class school" (Chinese: 一級學校) standard in Huizhou in 2005. The "first-class school" standard can mean that the school is equipped with standard facilities or that the quality of teaching and learning is high.

== History ==
HNS was established by the Huizhou No. 1 Middle School (Chinese: 惠州市第一中学; pinyin: Huìzhōushì Dìyī Zhōngxué) and Shenzhen Dongsheng Education Group (SDEG, 深圳市東升教育集團) in September 2001. HFSSNS changed its name to Huizhou Nanshan School in September 2004 after HFSS resumed Secondary One enrollment.

== Administration ==
HFSS stopped enrolling new students for junior form courses in 2001. HNS has been run in a cooperative agreement between SDEG and HFSS since 2001. Teachers from HFSS were allocated to teach in HNS and HNS was funded by SDEG. However, those teachers returned to HFSS in 2004 as the new junior forms resumed at HFSS. At this time, the agreement between SDEG and HFSS ended. HNS started to be run by SDEG only.
