= Huizhou =

City in Guangdong, China

Huizhou 惠州市
- Prefecture-level city
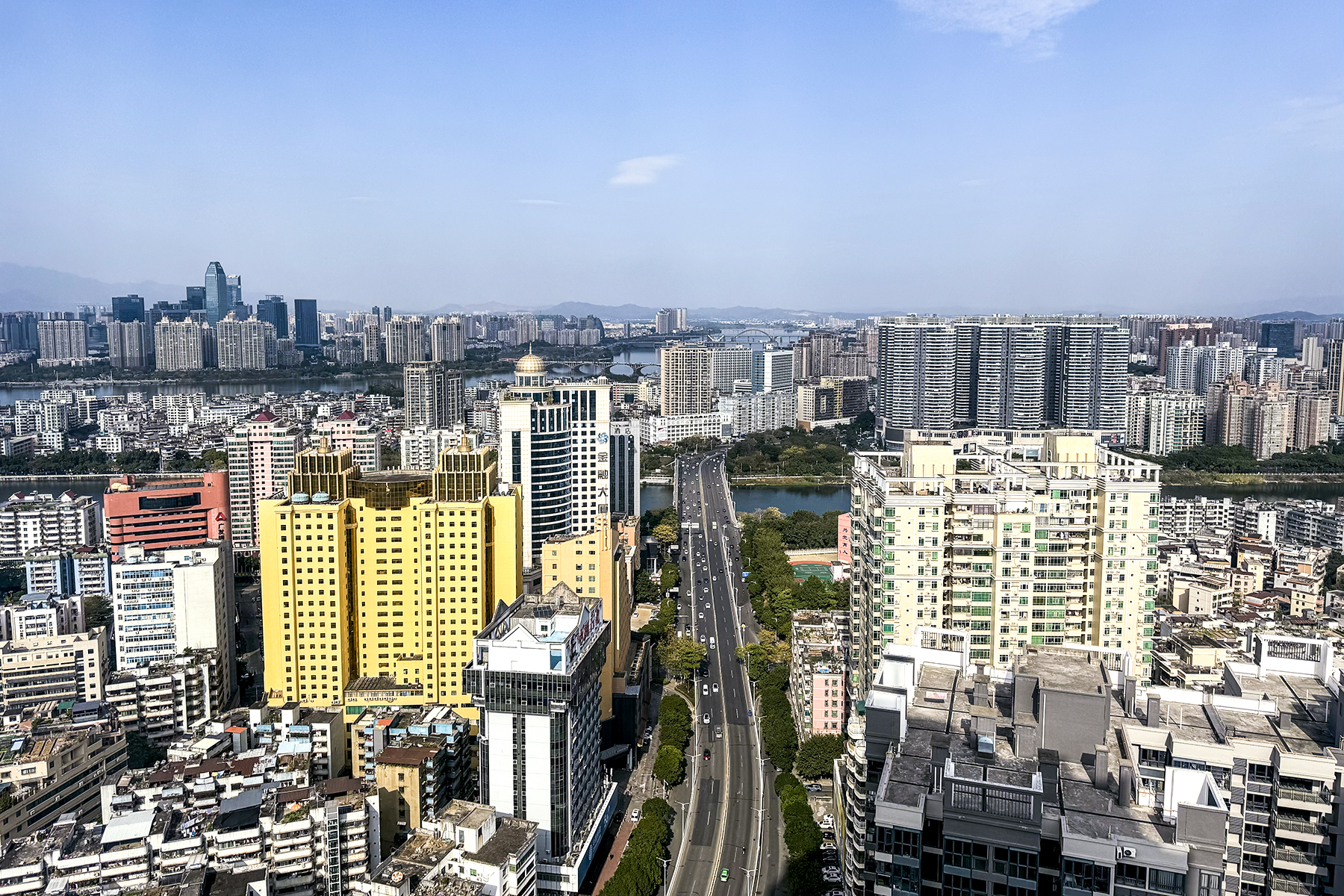
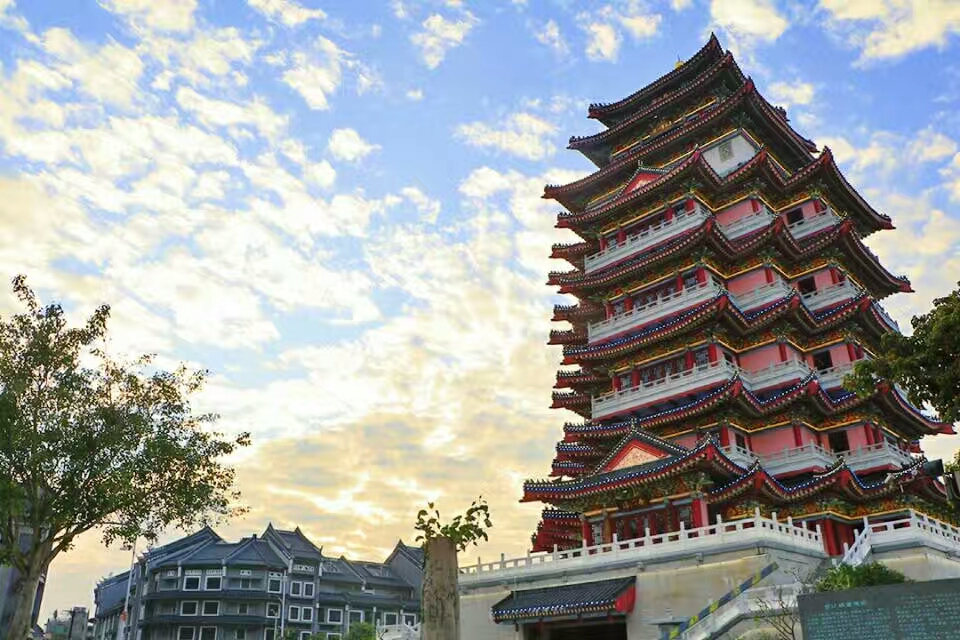
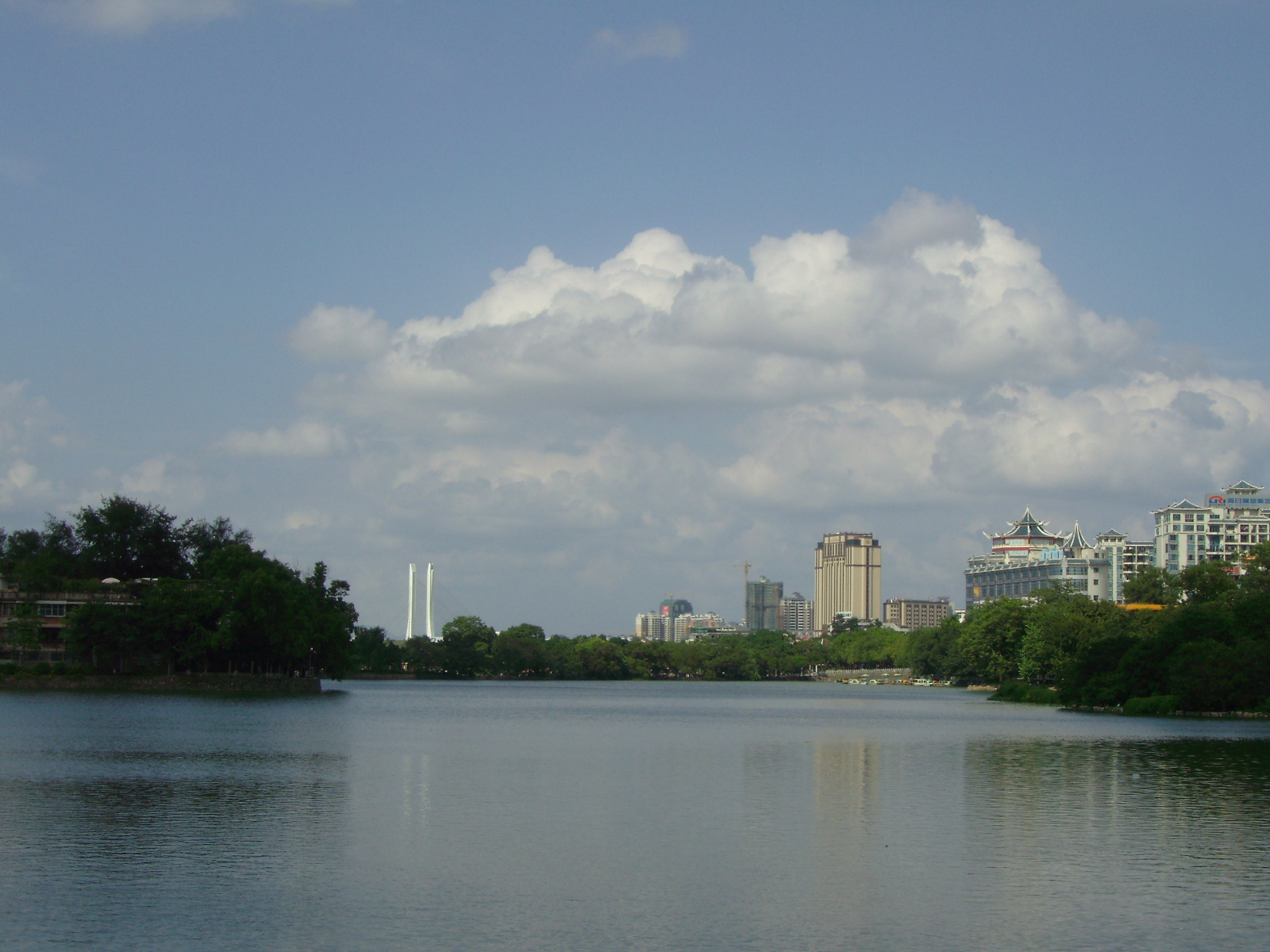
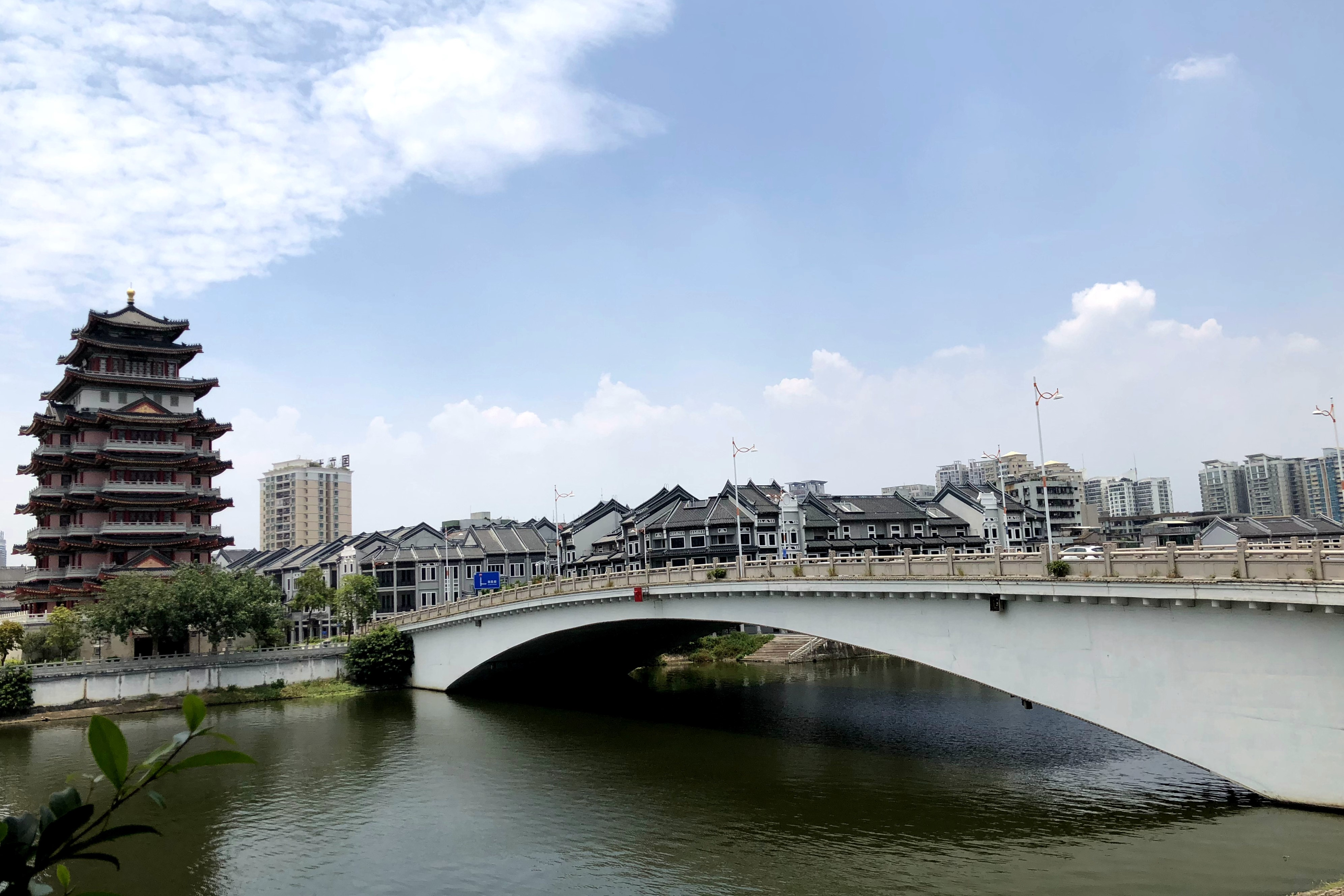
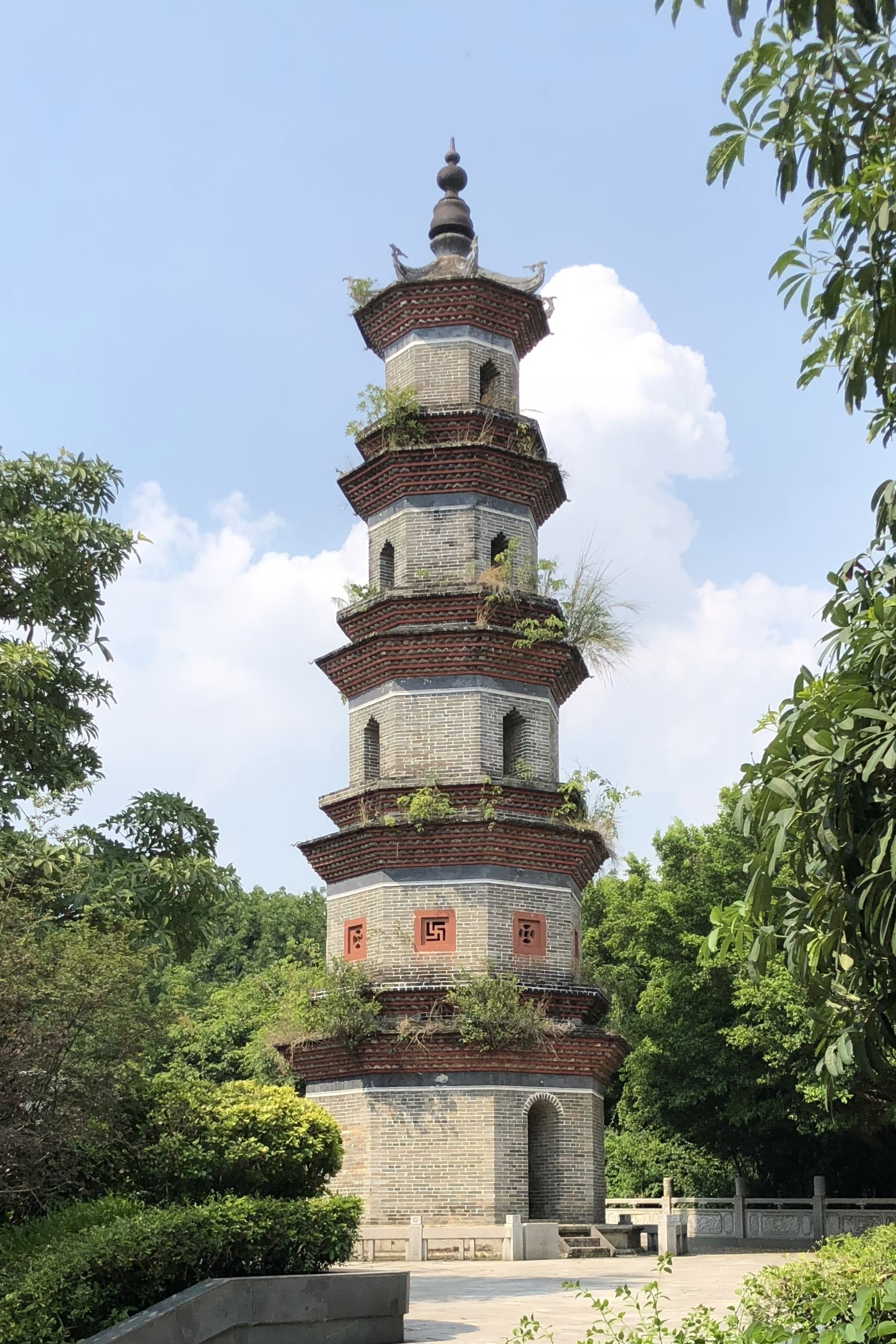
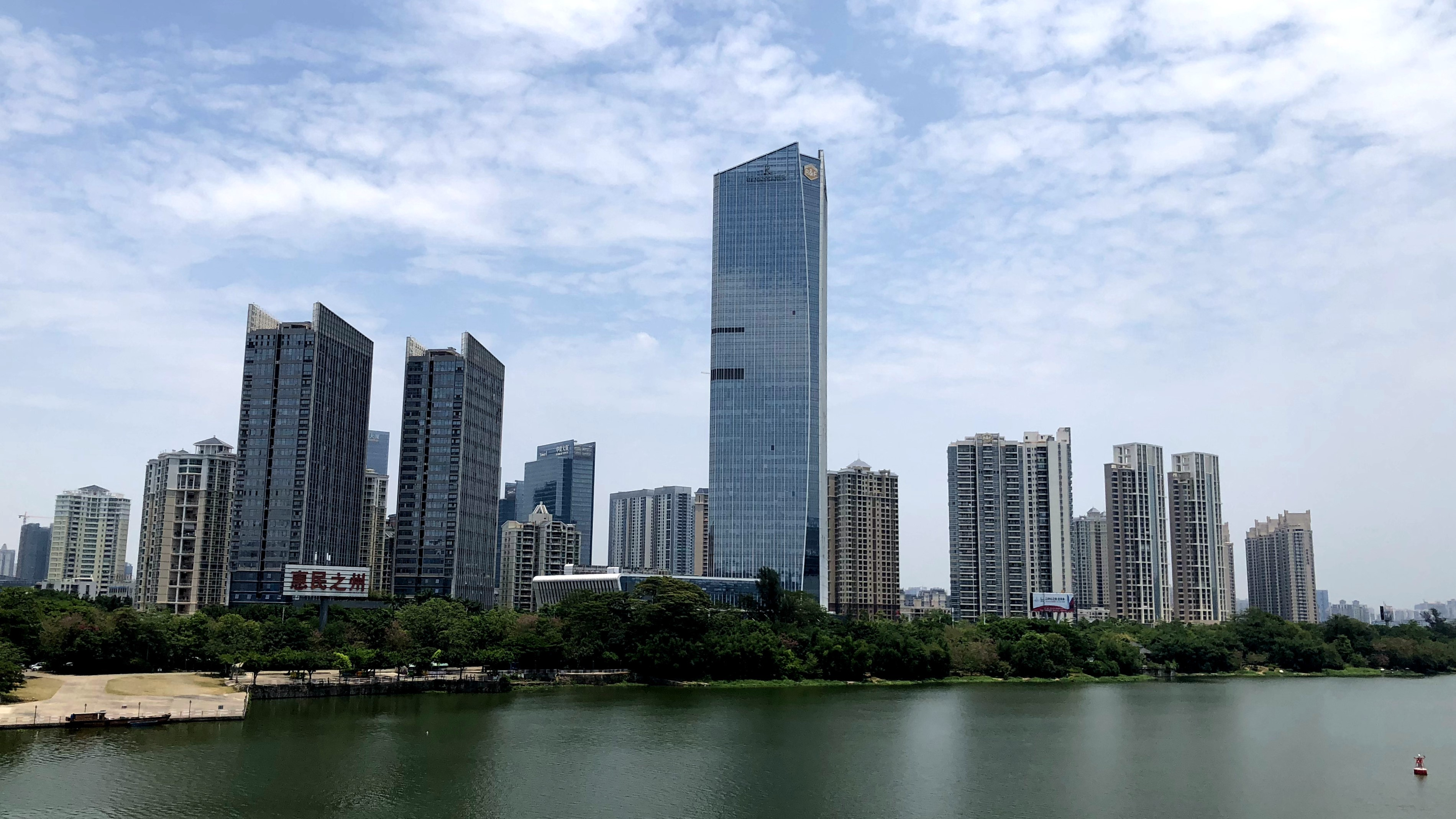
- View of Huicheng District Hejiang Tower Huizhou West Lake Dongxin Bridge Wenbi Pagoda Jiangbei CBD
- Motto: A city to benefit people (惠民之州)
- Location of Huizhou in Guangdong
- Interactive map of Huizhou
- Location of the city center in Guangdong Huizhou (China)
- Coordinates (Huizhou government): 23°06′43″N 114°24′58″E
- Country: China
- Province: Guangdong
- City: 1988
- Municipal seat: Huicheng District

Government
  - CPC Secretary: Chen Yuhang (陈宇航)
  - Mayor: Chen Yuhang (陈宇航)

Area
  - Prefecture-level city: 10,922 km^{2} (4,217 sq mi)
  - Urban: 2,672 km^{2} (1,032 sq mi)
  - Metro: 1,488.5 km^{2} (574.7 sq mi)
  - Coastline: 223.6 km^{2} (86.3 sq mi)
- Elevation: 15 m (49 ft)

Population (2020 census)
  - Prefecture-level city: 6,042,852
  - Density: 553.27/km^{2} (1,433.0/sq mi)
  - Urban: 3,494,715
  - Urban density: 1,308/km^{2} (3,387/sq mi)
  - Metro: 2,090,578
  - Metro density: 1,404.5/km^{2} (3,637.6/sq mi)

GDP
  - Prefecture-level city: CN¥ 497.7 billion US$ 77.2 billion
  - Per capita: CN¥ 82,113; US$ 12,728
- Time zone: UTC+08:00 (China Standard)
- Postal code: 516000
- Area code: 0752
- ISO 3166 code: CN-GD-13
- Licence Plate: 粤L
- Website: www.huizhou.gov.cn

Huizhou
- "Huizhou", as written in Chinese
- Chinese: 惠州
- Postal: Waichow
Transcriptions
Standard Mandarin
- Hanyu Pinyin: Huìzhōu
- IPA: [xwêɪʈʂóʊ]
Hakka
- Romanization: Fui^{4}ziu^{1}
Yue: Cantonese
- Yale Romanization: Waih-jāu
- Jyutping: Wai6-zau1
- IPA: [wɐj˨tsɐw˥]

Huizhou (Chinese: 惠州) is a city in east-central Guangdong Province, China, forty-three miles (69 kilometres) north of Hong Kong. Huizhou borders the provincial capital of Guangzhou to the west, Shenzhen and Dongguan to the southwest, Shaoguan to the north, Heyuan to the northeast, Shanwei to the east, and Daya Bay of the South China Sea to the south. As of the 2020 census, the city has about 6,042,852 inhabitants and is administered as a prefecture-level city. Huizhou's core metropolitan area, which is within Huicheng and Huiyang Districts, is home to around 2,090,578 inhabitants.

== History ==
During the Song dynasty, Huizhou was a prefectural capital of the Huiyang prefecture and the cultural center of the region.

The West Lake in Huizhou was formerly known as Feng Lake. At the age of 59, Su Shi was exiled to Huizhou by the imperial government of Song. When he visited Feng Lake in Huizhou, he found it located in the west of the city and was as beautiful as West Lake in Hangzhou. Therefore, he renamed it the West Lake. In order to solve the traffic problems on both sides of West Lake, he invested to help build two bridges. Later generations named bridges as the bridge Su Di to commemorate his achievements. And the two bridges in the West Lake becomes one of the eight scenic spots in the West Lake, called "Su Di Play Moon".

Huizhou used to be a prosperous region, specializing in commerce and trading, which changed during the 20th century due to wars. After the 1980s, Huizhou developed as a manufacturing base.

== Demographics ==
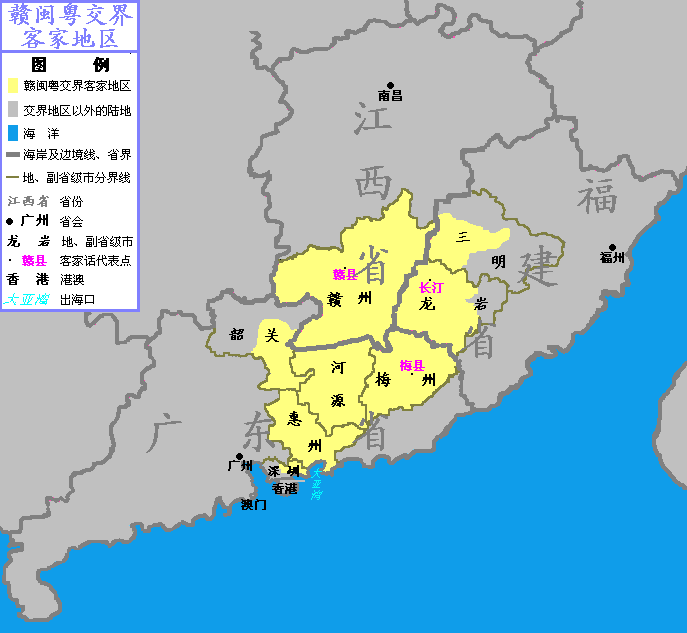
Huizhou is located in the Hakka-speaking area at the boundary of the Gan, Min, and Yue speaking areas.

=== Historical demographics ===
In ancient China, Huizhou and Heyuan were a part of the remote Lingnan region. In pre-Tang times, the population included Baiyue peoples (Zhuang, Yao, Hmong, Tanka, and She) but very few Han Chinese aside from imperial Chinese soldiers. According to the Huiyang County annals (2003), during the late Yuan dynasty (14th century), what is now Huizhou had only 45,410 inhabitants in 9,545 households. That corresponds to one household or five people per square kilometer. Most of the 6 million inhabitants in Huizhou and Heyuan are descended from people who migrated during the late Yuan and early Ming dynasties and during the Qing dynasty after the Great Clearance.

=== Population ===
According to the 2020 census, the city's permanent population was 6,042,852, representing an increase of 1,444,450 people, or 31.43%, from the 2010 census. Between 2000 and 2010, the average annual increase over that 10-year period was 3.64%. As of 2010, the population included 2,419,258 males (52.63%) and 2,177,744 females (47.37%), for a sex ratio of 111.09 males for every 100 females. There were 809,270 children aged 0–14 (17.6%); 3,517,928 people aged 15–64 (76.53%), and 269,804 people aged 65 and older (5.87%).

=== Ethnicity ===
The majority of Huizhou's residents are Han Chinese, with a population of 3,617,800, 97.69% of Huizhou's population. There are 85,500 residents of minority ethnic groups, including Yao and She, representing 2.31% of the population. The Han population includes Hakka and Hoklo people. The Hakka are distributed widely in each district and county of the prefecture-level city, and Huizhou has Hakka walled villages. The Hoklo are concentrated in Boluo County and Huidong County. In Hong Kong, Macau, and Taiwan, there are more than 800,000 people of Huizhou ancestry.

== Economy ==
Located in the Pearl River Delta, Huizhou is one of the 9 prefecture-level cities in the Pearl River Delta Economic Zone (include Huizhou urban area, Huiyang, Huidong and Boluo only). TCL, a major TV and multinational consumer electronics company is headquartered in Huizhou.

=== Development zones ===
==== Huizhou Dayawan Economic and Technological Development Zone ====
The Huizhou Daya Bay Economic and Technological Development Zone (DBETDZ) was approved by the State Council in 1993. It had an initial area of 9.98 km^{2} (3.85 sq mi), and in 2006, the State Council expanded the zone to 23.6 km^{2} (9.1 sq mi) in three phases.

Industries encouraged in the zone include Automobile Production/Assembly, Chemical Production and Processing and Electronics Assembly & Manufacturing.

==== Huizhou Export Processing Zone ====
The Huizhou Export Processing Zone was approved by Guangdong Provincial Government as a subzone of DBETDZ in June 2005. The planned area was 3 km^{2} (1.2 sq mi) in size. The zone was considered suitable for companies focusing on electronics, auto parts, textiles and chemicals.

==== Huizhou Zhongkai High-tech Industrial Development Zone ====
The Huizhou Zhongkai High-tech Industrial Development Zone is connected with Shenzhen, Guangzhou and Dongguan by the Huizhou-Shenzhen Highway, Guangzhou-Huizhou Highway and Dongguan-Huizhou Highway, respectively. The Beijing-Kowloon Railway and Huizhou-Aotou Railway also run through the zone, linking it with Beijing, Hong Kong, and other cities along the railway. Shenzhen Bao'an International Airport is a one-and-a-half hour drive from the zone.

The Huizhou Zhongkai HIDZ has also established electronics, information technology and optical-, mechanical- and electronic-integration as its major industries. It also encourages investment in new materials, telecommunications, and other high-tech industries. The zone is one of the National Electronic Information Industry Bases and National Video and Audio Products Parks in China.

== Administration ==
The prefecture-level city of Huizhou administers 5 county-level divisions, including 2 districts and 3 counties.

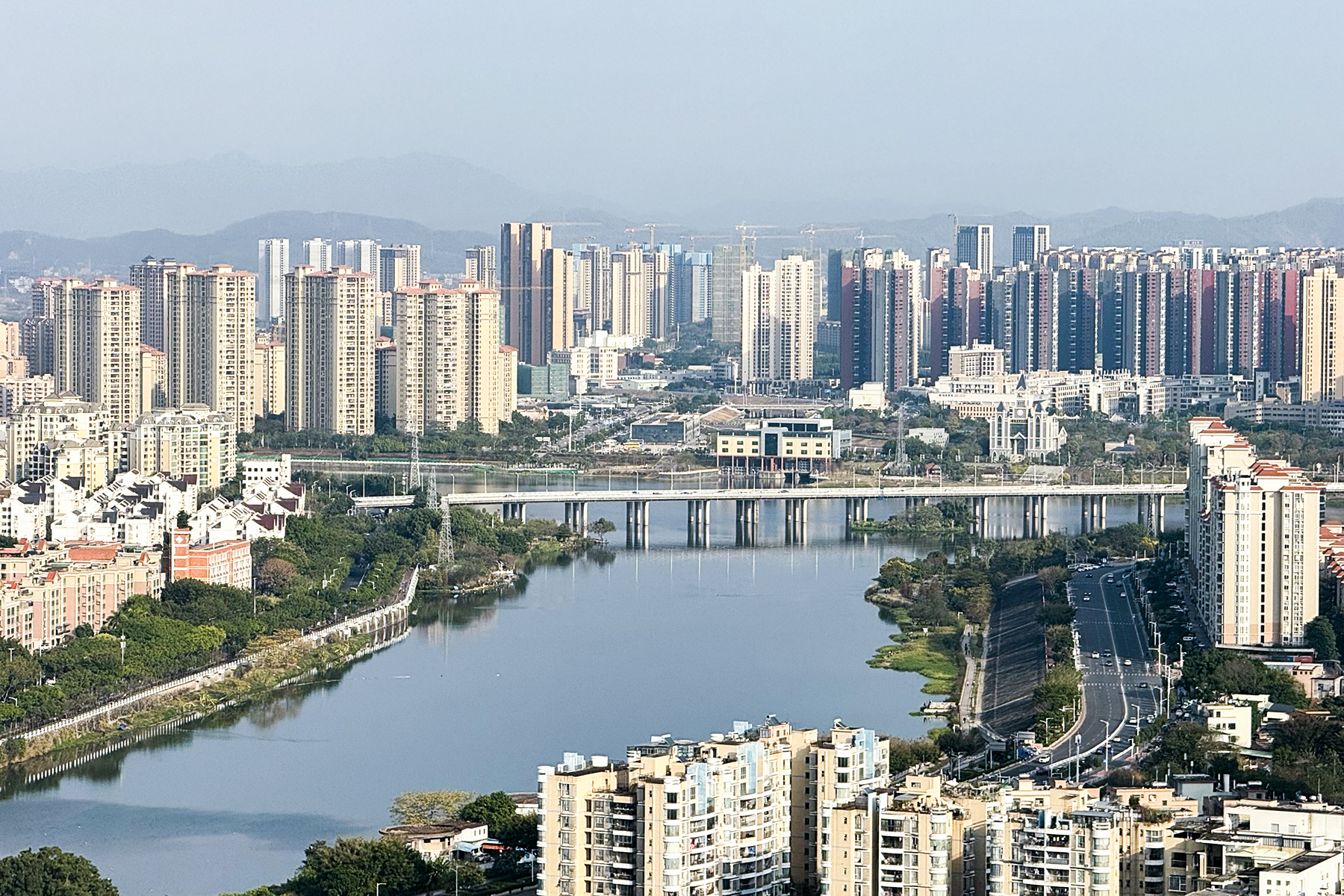
View of Huicheng District, Huizhou 2

Map
| Name | Simplified Chinese | Hanyu Pinyin | Population (2010 census) | Area (km^{2}) | Density (/km^{2}) |
|---|---|---|---|---|---|
| Huicheng District | 惠城区 | Huìchéng Qū | 1,579,818 | 1,488.45 | 1,061 |
| Huiyang District | 惠阳区 | Huìyáng Qū | 764,816 | 1,205.44 | 664 |
| Boluo County | 博罗县 | Bóluó Xiàn | 1,038,198 | 2,855.11 | 364 |
| Huidong County | 惠东县 | Huìdōng Xiàn | 908,390 | 3,526.73 | 258 |
| Longmen County | 龙门县 | Lóngmén Xiàn | 307,180 | 2,267.2 | 135 |

== Transport ==
Huicheng, the urban center of Huizhou, is served by the Jingjiu Railway (also known as the Guangmeishan Railway in Guangdong) with two stations: Huizhou West and Huizhou. Huizhou itself is vast as Los Angeles County with sparse rail service as compared with bay peer cities.

Huizhou Pingtan Airport reopened in 2015. Additionally, the town is about a one and one half-hour drive by bus from Shenzhen Bao'an International Airport. There are also coach bus services connecting Huizhou with Hong Kong International Airport.

A mass rapid transit linking it to Shenzhen was under construction as of 2011.

In April 2018, the China Daily announced that the world's first automatic railroad was currently under construction between Dongguan and Huizhou. As a pilot project, it would contain ten railway stations, driverless trains and robotic assistance for passengers with luggage and tickets.

== Language ==
The main languages spoken in Huizhou are Hakka (mainly Huiyang dialect), Cantonese, Hokkien, and Huizhou dialect.

== Military ==
Huizhou is the headquarters of the 42nd Group Army of the People's Liberation Army, one of the two group armies that comprise the Guangzhou Military Region responsible for the defense of China's southern coast and its border with Vietnam.

== Education ==
Educational facilities in Huizhou include:

- Huizhou University
- Huizhou Radio and Television University
- Huizhou Nanshan School
- Medi's International school

== Sport ==
Huizhou is a well-known city of sports in China with the opening of Huizhou Olympic Stadium in 2010.

== Climate ==
Huizhou has a humid subtropical climate (Köppen climate classification: Cwa). Summers are long, hot and humid. Winters are short, mild and dry.

Climate data for Huizhou (Huiyang District), elevation 109 m (358 ft), (1991–2020 normals, extremes 1955–present)
| Month | Jan | Feb | Mar | Apr | May | Jun | Jul | Aug | Sep | Oct | Nov | Dec | Year |
|---|---|---|---|---|---|---|---|---|---|---|---|---|---|
| Record high °C (°F) | 29.1 (84.4) | 30.1 (86.2) | 32.5 (90.5) | 34.2 (93.6) | 35.7 (96.3) | 38.0 (100.4) | 38.9 (102.0) | 37.7 (99.9) | 36.4 (97.5) | 36.1 (97.0) | 33.0 (91.4) | 29.6 (85.3) | 38.9 (102.0) |
| Mean daily maximum °C (°F) | 19.0 (66.2) | 20.4 (68.7) | 23.0 (73.4) | 26.7 (80.1) | 29.9 (85.8) | 31.8 (89.2) | 33.2 (91.8) | 33.0 (91.4) | 31.9 (89.4) | 29.2 (84.6) | 25.3 (77.5) | 20.6 (69.1) | 27.0 (80.6) |
| Daily mean °C (°F) | 14.2 (57.6) | 15.8 (60.4) | 18.6 (65.5) | 22.5 (72.5) | 25.7 (78.3) | 27.7 (81.9) | 28.7 (83.7) | 28.4 (83.1) | 27.4 (81.3) | 24.6 (76.3) | 20.5 (68.9) | 15.7 (60.3) | 22.5 (72.5) |
| Mean daily minimum °C (°F) | 11.0 (51.8) | 12.7 (54.9) | 15.6 (60.1) | 19.6 (67.3) | 22.9 (73.2) | 25.0 (77.0) | 25.7 (78.3) | 25.6 (78.1) | 24.4 (75.9) | 21.3 (70.3) | 17.0 (62.6) | 12.4 (54.3) | 19.4 (67.0) |
| Record low °C (°F) | −1.9 (28.6) | 2.5 (36.5) | 2.6 (36.7) | 8.4 (47.1) | 15.5 (59.9) | 18.1 (64.6) | 20.5 (68.9) | 21.9 (71.4) | 17.0 (62.6) | 12.3 (54.1) | 5.1 (41.2) | 0.5 (32.9) | −1.9 (28.6) |
| Average precipitation mm (inches) | 44.8 (1.76) | 47.7 (1.88) | 86.7 (3.41) | 177.9 (7.00) | 235.6 (9.28) | 354.8 (13.97) | 246.0 (9.69) | 298.7 (11.76) | 172.3 (6.78) | 46.2 (1.82) | 30.4 (1.20) | 36.6 (1.44) | 1,777.7 (69.99) |
| Average precipitation days (≥ 0.1 mm) | 5.9 | 8.4 | 11.1 | 13.3 | 15.9 | 19.2 | 16.8 | 17.5 | 11.8 | 5.6 | 5.0 | 5.1 | 135.6 |
| Average relative humidity (%) | 70 | 75 | 78 | 80 | 81 | 82 | 80 | 81 | 77 | 69 | 68 | 66 | 76 |
| Mean monthly sunshine hours | 132.8 | 97.4 | 85.8 | 90.0 | 123.6 | 139.2 | 190.4 | 174.1 | 182.4 | 201.8 | 168.2 | 156.0 | 1,741.7 |
| Percentage possible sunshine | 39 | 33 | 28 | 30 | 34 | 40 | 52 | 48 | 50 | 52 | 50 | 45 | 42 |
Source: China Meteorological Administrationall-time record lowall-time October record

== Tourism ==
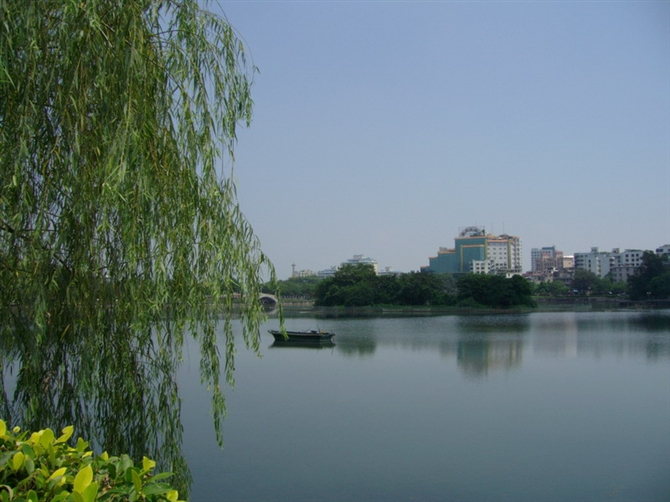
South and West Lake in Linghu

=== Daya Bay ===
Daya Bay is located to the southeast of Huizhou City, on the South China Sea, with waters covering an area of nearly 500 km^{2} (190 sq mi). There are nearly 100 islands and reefs in the bay. The climate is described as a typical subtropical oceanic climate, with temperatures averaging 21.8 °C (71.2 °F) over the year. Historically, Daya Bay had whales and turtles. The bay was one of the breeding grounds along the southern coast of China for Asian population of gray whales which are now one of the most endangered whale population in the world. They migrated here to calve in the winter-spring seasons. Other species, such as humpback whales also migrated here historically. All of these were wiped out by Japanese whalers established whaling stations on various sites on Chinese coasts including at nearby Daya Bay. Critically endangered Chinese white dolphins and occasional whales such as humpbacks have been confirmed in the bay recent years.

== International relations ==
=== Twin towns – sister cities ===
Huizhou is twinned with:

- Hallstatt, Austria
- North Vancouver, Canada
- Milpitas, United States

=== Friendly cities ===
- Apia, Samoa
- Seongnam, South Korea
- Worcester, England, United Kingdom

== Notable people ==
- Zeng Jingsheng (born 1954) - painter
- Skai Isyourgod (born 24 December 1998) - rapper
