= Daya Bay =

Bay of the South China Sea

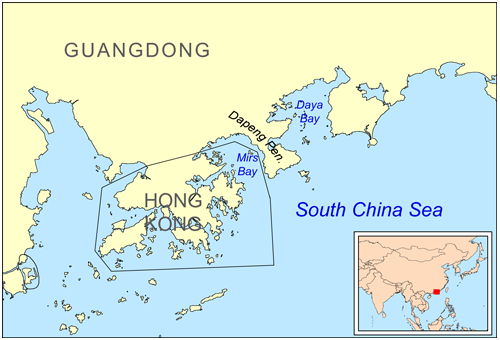
Daya Bay in the Pearl River Delta region

Daya Bay (simplified Chinese: 大亚湾; traditional Chinese: 大亞灣; pinyin: Dàyà Wān; Jyutping: daai^{6}aa^{3} waan^{1}), formerly known as Bias Bay, is a bay of the South China Sea on the south coast of Guangdong Province in China. It is bordered by Shenzhen's Dapeng Peninsula to the west and Huizhou to the north and east.

== History ==
The bay was a hideout of pirates in the 1920s, when the Republic of China government was occupied with conducting the Northern Expedition. Part of it was seized by the Japanese military in the Canton Operation.

== Environment ==
Historically, Daya Bay had whales and turtles. The bay was one of the breeding grounds along the southern coast of China for Asian population of gray whales, which are now one of the most endangered whale population in the world. They migrated to the bay to calve in the winter-spring seasons. Other species, such as humpback whales, also historically migrated to Daya Bay. All of these were wiped out by Japanese whalers established whaling stations on various sites on Chinese coasts including at nearby Daya Bay. Critically endangered Chinese white dolphins and occasional whales such as humpbacks have been confirmed in the bay in recent years.

== Transportation ==
The freight-only Huizhou–Dayawan railway connects Daya Bay with the Chinese railway network. In the future, the area will be served by the Shenzhen–Dayawan intercity railway.
