= Catcher in the Rye (band) =

Chinese punk rock band

- Origin: Beijing, China
- Genres: Punk rock, indie rock, pop rock
- Years active: 1994–present
- Labels: Red Star Production Co. Ltd., Taihe Rye Music Co. Ltd.
- Members: Xiao Wei; Liu Le; Gao Le; Su Yang
- Past members: Liu En; Li Peng

Catcher in the Rye (麦田守望者 Maitian shouwangzhe) is considered to be one of China's earliest punk rock bands, formed in 1994. The band features Xiao Wei as lead vocalist, and the band's first (self-titled) album was released in 1998.
