= Taihe Rye Music =

Chinese record label

Taihe Rye Music Co., Ltd.
- Native name: 北京太合麦田音乐文化发展有限公司
- Type: Private
- Industry: entertainment
- Founded: 2004
- Founder: Song Ke, Zhang Yadong
- Headquarters: Beijing, China
- Number of locations: 1
- Area served: Mainland China and Hong Kong
- Key people: Song Ke, Zhang Yadong (CEO)
- Services: record label
- Owner: Song Ke, Zhang Yadong
- Parent: Taihe Music Group
- Website: www.trmusic.com.cn

Taihe Rye Music is a C-pop (Mandopop) record label, founded in China in 2004 by Song Ke and Zhang Yadong.

== History ==
The company was founded in 1996, originally as a subsidiary of Warner Music Group. In 2004, Taihe Rye Music broke away from Warner to form its own independent record label in China. It is divided into several sub-labels.

== See also ==
- C-pop
- Super Girl
