= Mountain (disambiguation) =

A mountain is a type of landform.

Mountain or Mountains may also refer to:

== Places ==
=== United States ===
- Mountain (CDP), Wisconsin, an unincorporated community
- Mountain, West Virginia, an unincorporated community
- Mountain, North Dakota, a town
- Mountain, Wisconsin, a town
- Mountain States, one of the nine US geographic divisions; a subregion of the Western United States
- Mountain Township (disambiguation)

=== Other places ===
- Mountain, Manitoba, a rural municipality in Canada
- Mountain Province, a province in the Cordillera Region of the Philippines
- Mountain, a hamlet in Queensbury, West Yorkshire, England

== People ==
- Mountain (surname)
- Man Mountain Rock, later stage name used by professional wrestler Maxx Payne
- Mountain Fiji, a female professional wrestler from the Gorgeous Ladies of Wrestling

== Arts, entertainment, and media ==
=== Films ===
- Mountain (2015 film), a 2015 Israeli film
- Mountain (2017 film), a documentary
- Mountains (2023 film), an American drama film

=== Music ===
==== Groups ====
- Mountain (band), an American rock band
- Mountains (band), an American drone band who record for Thrill Jockey

==== Albums ====
- Mountain (Leslie West album), a 1969 solo album by future Mountain frontman Leslie West
- Mountain, a 2004 album by the Finnish rock band Circle
- Mountains (Steamhammer album), 1970
- Mountains (Mary Timony album), 2000
- Mountains (Lonestar album), 2006
- Mountains (Nils Lofgren album), 2023
- The Mountain (Gorillaz album), 2026

==== Songs ====
- "Mountain" (Chocolate Starfish song), a 1994 single from Chocolate Starfish's self-titled studio album
- "Mountain", a song by Good Charlotte from The Chronicles of Life and Death, 2004
- "Mountain" (Sam Ryder song), a 2023 single
- "Mountains" (Biffy Clyro song), a single released in 2008 by Biffy Clyro
- "Mountains" (Lonestar song), a 2006 single from this album
- "Mountains" (Prince song), 1986 song by Prince from the album Parade
- "Mountains", a song by Emeli Sandé from the album Our Version of Events
- "Mountains", a song by Lucy Spraggan
- "Mountains", a song by Stray Kids from the EP Ate
- "Mountain", the working title to the Gen Hoshino song "Eureka" (2025)

==== Other music ====
- Mountain Records, a record label
- Mountain Music (disambiguation), several meanings

=== Other arts, entertainment, and media ===
- Mountain, a 1920 novel by Clement Wood
- The Mountains, a 1904 novel by Stewart Edward White
- Mountain (advertisement), a 2003 advertisement for the PlayStation 2 video game console
- Mountain (TV series), a BBC production presented by Griff Rhys Jones
- "Mountains" (Planet Earth), a 2006 television episode
- "Mountains" (Planet Earth II), a 2016 television episode
- Mountain (video game), a 2014 video game by David OReilly
- Planine (English: Mountains), a 1536 novel by Croatian Petar Zoranić

== Transport ==
- Edel Mountain, a South Korean paraglider designed for mountain descents
- Mountain Station, a train station in New Jersey, United States
- Mountain railroad steam locomotive, classified as 4-8-2 in the Whyte notation

== Other uses ==
- Mountain climate, a crude geographical term used for the kind of climate in the mountains
- Mountain Time Zone, one of the time zones of North America
- Mountain range, a set of mountains
- Mountain soap, rock clay
- Mountain Dew, a soft drink brand owned by PepsiCo

== See also ==
- The Mountain (disambiguation)
- Mountain River (disambiguation)
- MountainsMap, micro-topography software published by Digital Surf
- Mount (disambiguation)
- Massif (disambiguation)
- Hill (disambiguation)
