= Ronghua (disambiguation) =

Ronghua is a rural township in Xinhua County, Hunan Province, China.

Ronghua may also refer to:

- "Rónghuà (熔化)", a track in the album Mountain River by Dou Wei

== Geography ==
- Ronghua Community (荣华社区), Wangyuehu, Yuelu, Changsha, Hunan Province, China
- Ronghua Dam, a dam crossing the Dahan River
- Ronghua railway station, a railway station on the Taiwan Railways Administration Neiwan Line
- Ronghua Subdistrict, Beijing, China
- Ronghua Subdistrict (榕华街道), Rongcheng, Jieyang, Guangdong Province, China
- Ronghua Township (荣华乡), Debao County, Guangxi, China
- Ronghua Village (荣花村), Desheng, Heilongjiang Province, China
- Ronghua Village (榮華村), Mijiang, Chaling, Hunan Province, China
- Ronghua Village (榮華里), Shipai, Taipei, Taiwan
- Ronghua Village (榮華里), Zhudong, Hsinchu County, Taiwan

== Names ==
- Hu Ronghua (born 1945), one of the strongest players of Chinese chess
- John Baptist Ye Ronghua (1931–2022), a Chinese Roman Catholic prelate
- Li Ronghua (born 1956), a female Chinese rowing cox
- Lü Ronghua (born 1983), a Chinese male racewalker
- Zhu Ronghua (born 1974), a Chinese long-distance runner
- Liang Eng Hwa (连荣华; pinyin: Lián Rónghuá; born 1964), a Singaporean politician and banker
- Yap Weng Wah (叶荣华; pinyin: Yè Rónghuá; born 1983), a Malaysian serial sex offender
- Xiao Hong (1911–1942), ruming (乳名) Zhang Ronghua, a Chinese writer
