= Soap (disambiguation) =

Soap is a surfactant cleaning compound used for personal or other cleaning.

SOAP is an XML computer network protocol (originally an acronym for Simple Object Access Protocol), a protocol specification in computer networks.

Soap or SOAP may also refer to:

== Arts and entertainment ==
=== Television ===
- Soap opera, ongoing, episodic work of fiction on TV or radio
- Soap (TV series), a 1970s sitcom

=== Fictional characters ===
- Captain Soap MacTavish, fictional soldier from the Call of Duty: Modern Warfare series
- Hotel Soap is an animated cartoon character in the Dr. Tran animated series of internet shorts

=== Music ===
- S.O.A.P. (duo), a Danish pop music duo
- Sons of All Pussys, a Japanese band often abbreviated S.O.A.P.
- "Soap" (song), by Melanie Martinez, 2015
- "Soap", a song by Stand Atlantic from Pink Elephant, 2020
- "Soap", a song by Yves and PinkPantheress from Soft Error, 2025

== Science and technology ==
- Short Oligonucleotide Analysis Package, a bioinformatics package used for the assembly and analysis of DNA sequences
- SOAP ("Simplify Obscure Algol Programs"), an Algol 60 prettyprinter
- SOAP note, a method of documentation used in medical charts
- Spectrometric Oil Analysis Program, a method for testing the oil in aircraft engines for the concentration of critical metals to identify wear of engine parts
- Sugar soap, a material used for cleaning surfaces before repainting
- Symbolic Optimal Assembly Program, an assembly language for the IBM 650 computer

== Other uses ==
- Society of Australian Punk, an organisation focused on Australian punk
- Significant Other Acceptance Parameters, a non-gendered replacement for wife acceptance factor, a tern used by display and audio enthusiasts
- Supplemental Offer and Acceptance Program, for medical students who were not initially matched with U.S. residencies by the National Resident Matching Program

== See also ==
- Mountain soap
- Soap Creek (Missouri), a stream in the U.S. state of Missouri
- Soap shoes, skateboarding shoes made for grinding
- Joe Soap, a comic strip series
- En Soap, 2006 Danish comedy film
