= Qinggang County =

Qinggang County 青冈县
- County
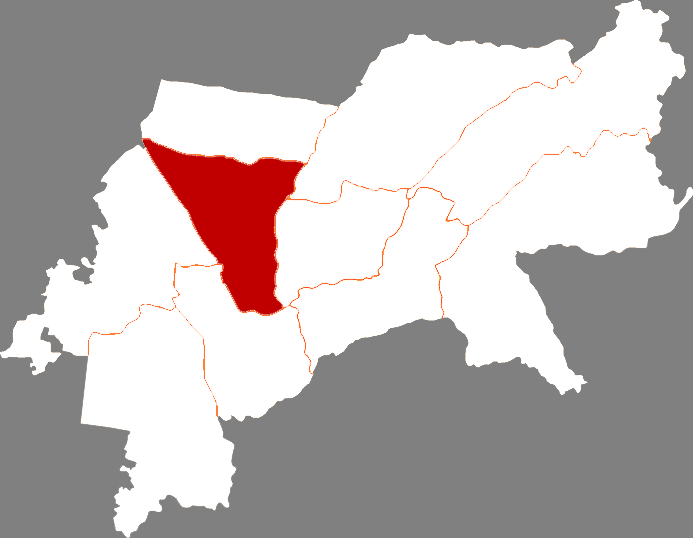

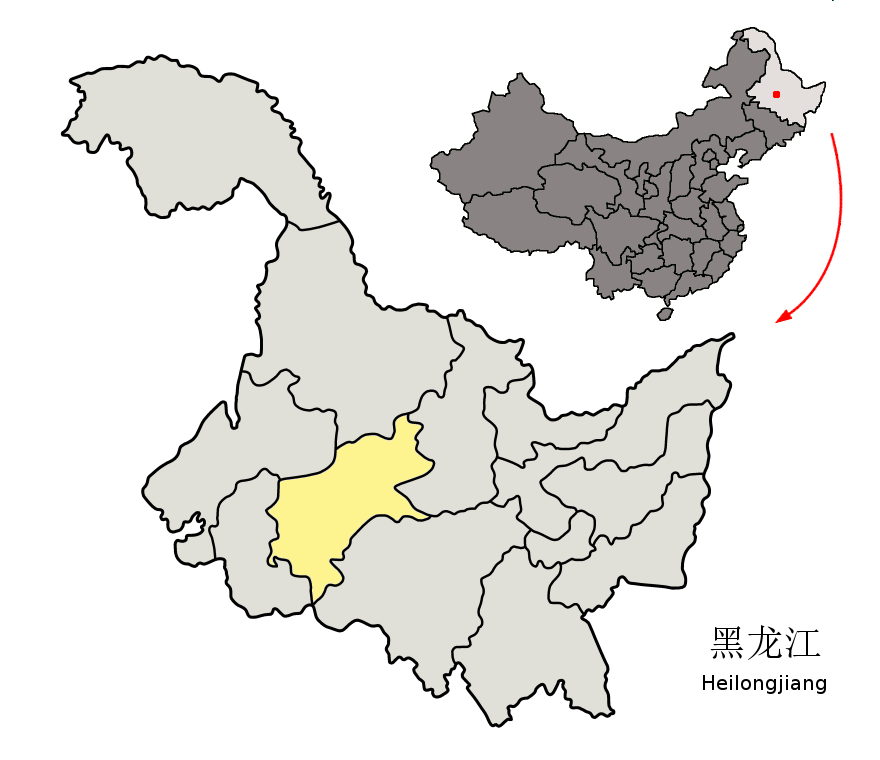
- Suihua in Heilongjiang
- Coordinates: 46°41′24″N 126°06′50″E
- Country: People's Republic of China
- Province: Heilongjiang
- Prefecture-level city: Suihua

Area
  - Total: 2,684.71 km^{2} (1,036.57 sq mi)

Population (2010)
  - Total: 474,422
  - Density: 176.713/km^{2} (457.683/sq mi)
- Time zone: UTC+8 (China Standard)

Qinggang County (simplified Chinese: 青冈县; traditional Chinese: 青岡縣; pinyin: Qīnggāng Xiàn) is a county of western Heilongjiang province, People's Republic of China. It is under the jurisdiction of the prefecture-level city of Suihua.

== Administrative divisions ==
Qinggang County is divided into 4 subdistricts, 12 towns and 3 townships.

4 subdistricts

- Beicheng (北城街道), Xicheng (西城街道), Jingcheng (靖城街道), Dongcheng (东城街道)

12 towns

- Qinggang (青冈镇), Zhonghe (中和镇), Zhenxiang (祯祥镇), Xinghua (兴华镇), Yongfeng (永丰镇), Luhe (芦河镇), Minzheng (民政镇), Zhagang (柞岗镇), Laodong (劳动镇), Yingchun (迎春镇), Desheng (德胜镇), Changsheng (昌盛镇)

3 townships

- Jianshe (建设乡), Xincun (新村乡), Lianfeng (连丰乡)

== Demographics ==
The population of the district was 426,961 in 1999.

== Climate ==
Climate data for Qinggang, elevation 207 m (679 ft), (1991–2020 normals, extremes 1981–2010)
Month	Jan	Feb	Mar	Apr	May	Jun	Jul	Aug	Sep	Oct	Nov	Dec	Year
Record high °C (°F)	−0.4 (31.3)	8.0 (46.4)	20.9 (69.6)	30.6 (87.1)	34.2 (93.6)	38.9 (102.0)	36.6 (97.9)	35.3 (95.5)	31.9 (89.4)	25.5 (77.9)	15.3 (59.5)	5.8 (42.4)	38.9 (102.0)
Mean daily maximum °C (°F)	−13.8 (7.2)	−7.8 (18.0)	1.8 (35.2)	12.6 (54.7)	20.8 (69.4)	25.9 (78.6)	27.4 (81.3)	25.7 (78.3)	20.5 (68.9)	11.2 (52.2)	−1.7 (28.9)	−11.8 (10.8)	9.2 (48.6)
Daily mean °C (°F)	−18.9 (−2.0)	−13.7 (7.3)	−4.0 (24.8)	6.6 (43.9)	14.7 (58.5)	20.4 (68.7)	22.8 (73.0)	20.8 (69.4)	14.6 (58.3)	5.5 (41.9)	−6.7 (19.9)	−16.6 (2.1)	3.8 (38.8)
Mean daily minimum °C (°F)	−23.3 (−9.9)	−19.0 (−2.2)	−9.6 (14.7)	0.6 (33.1)	8.5 (47.3)	15.1 (59.2)	18.4 (65.1)	16.3 (61.3)	9.2 (48.6)	0.5 (32.9)	−10.9 (12.4)	−20.7 (−5.3)	−1.2 (29.8)
Record low °C (°F)	−38.6 (−37.5)	−33.6 (−28.5)	−24.7 (−12.5)	−13.0 (8.6)	−5.4 (22.3)	2.8 (37.0)	9.3 (48.7)	6.2 (43.2)	−3.9 (25.0)	−15.4 (4.3)	−27.4 (−17.3)	−34.5 (−30.1)	−38.6 (−37.5)
Average precipitation mm (inches)	2.2 (0.09)	2.2 (0.09)	7.7 (0.30)	18.5 (0.73)	38.3 (1.51)	96.3 (3.79)	162.5 (6.40)	115.8 (4.56)	49.3 (1.94)	19 (0.7)	6.4 (0.25)	3.9 (0.15)	522.1 (20.51)
Average precipitation days (≥ 0.1 mm)	3.2	2.5	4.0	6.1	10.4	13.4	13.7	12.2	8.7	5.6	4.1	5.3	89.2
Average snowy days	6.5	4.6	6.5	2.8	0.1	0	0	0	0	1.8	6.5	8.1	36.9
Average relative humidity (%)	73	66	56	50	52	66	78	80	69	61	65	73	66
Mean monthly sunshine hours	185.3	207.3	250.1	242.7	261.6	254.9	242.5	229.8	233.5	205.4	171.8	162.1	2,647
Percentage possible sunshine	66	71	67	59	56	54	51	53	63	62	62	61	60
Source: China Meteorological Administration
