= Philco =

Defunct American electronics and appliance company (1892–1961)

- Formerly: Helios Electric Company; Philadelphia Storage Battery Company
- Type: Private (1892–1961); Subsidiary (1961–present)
- Industry: Electronics
- Founded: 1892; 134 years ago
- Headquarters: Philadelphia, Pennsylvania, U.S.
- Area served: Worldwide
- Key people: Philo Farnsworth
- Products: Consumer electronics
- Parent: Philips (North America), Electrolux (elsewhere)
- Website: www.philco-intl.eu/home-en

Philco (an acronym for Philadelphia Battery Company) is an American electronics manufacturer headquartered in Philadelphia. Philco was a pioneer in battery, radio, and television production. The company was purchased by Ford in 1961, and renamed "Philco-Ford" in 1966. Ford sold the company to GTE in 1974, which sold it to Norelco in 1981, that became a subsidiary of the Dutch company Philips in 1987. In North America, the Philco brand is owned by Philips. In other markets, the Philco International brand is owned by Electrolux.

In the early 1920s, Philco made storage batteries, "socket power" battery eliminator units (plug-in transformers), and battery chargers. With the invention of the rectifier tube, which made it practical to power radios by electrical outlets, in 1928, Philco entered the radio business. They followed other radio makers such as RCA, Atwater-Kent, Zenith Electronics, Freshman Masterpiece, FADA Radio (Frank A. D'Andrea Radio), and AH Grebe into the battery-powered radio business. By the end of 1930, they were selling more radios than any other maker, a position they held for more than 20 years.

Philco built many iconic radios and television sets, including the classic cathedral-shaped wooden radio of the 1930s (a.k.a. the "Baby Grand"), and the Predicta series of television receiver sets of the 1950s.

Philo Farnsworth, credited for inventing the first fully functional all-electronic television system (U.S. patent 1,773,980, filed Jan 7, 1927), worked at Philco from 1931 to 1933.

== Early history ==
Philco (PHIL = Philadelphia and CO = Company) was founded in 1892 as Helios Electric Company. From its inception until 1904, the company manufactured carbon-arc lamps. As this line of business slowly floundered over the last decade of the 19th century, the firm experienced increasingly difficult times. As the Philadelphia Storage Battery Company, it began making batteries for electric vehicles in 1906. It later supplied home charging batteries to the infant radio industry. The Philco brand name appeared in 1919.

=== Radios ===
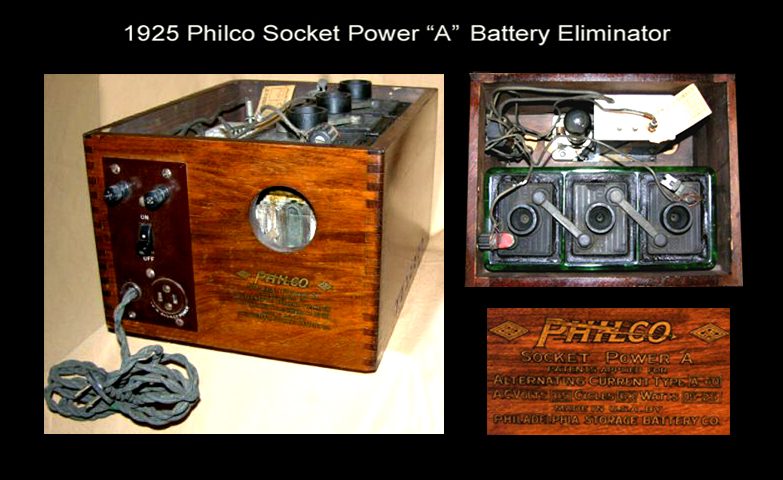
Philco produced Socket Power "A", "B", and "AB" Battery Eliminators, starting in August 1925. Model A-60 "A" Socket Power Battery Eliminator shown.

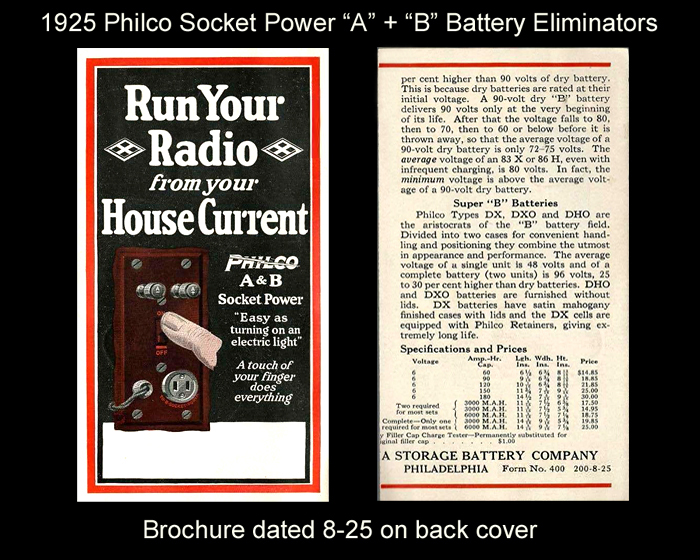
Philco Socket Power A & B Battery Eliminators – 1925 August brochure

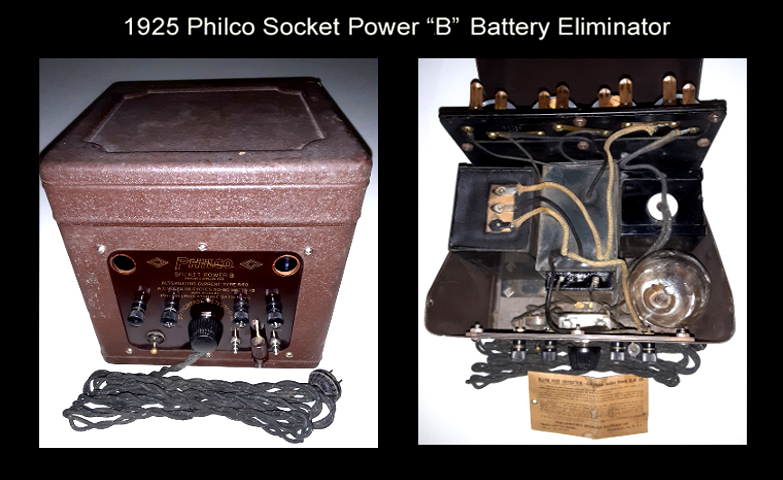
Philco Model B-60 "B" Socket Power Battery Eliminator – August 1925

Until the mid- to late-1920s, all radios except crystal radios were powered by vacuum tube batteries, which were expensive, needed frequent charging, and leaked battery acid, reducing the wife acceptance factor in the home. A very successful August 1925 Philco consumer product, called the "Socket Power Battery Eliminator", was a rectifier unit that enabled users to operate radios from standard lightbulb sockets. By 1927 over a million of these units had been sold, but from that year the industry began manufacturing batteryless radios using RCA's AC tube. The almost immediate end of demand for battery eliminators forced Philco to quickly design and manufacture its own radios that used household power. The first Philco radios were introduced in mid-1928, and 96,000 were produced that year, making Philco 26th in the nation in radio production volume. Up to that time most radios were handmade and priced for relatively wealthy consumers. Erstwhile competitor Atwater Kent, the leading radio seller, was also located in Philadelphia.

The Philadelphia Storage Battery Company decided that radio production costs could be reduced by incorporating assembly line techniques then only used by the automobile industry, and began producing less expensive mass-market radios. By the 1929 model year, Philco was in third place behind Atwater Kent and Majestic (Grigsby-Grunow Corp) in radio sales. In 1930, the company sold 600,000 radios, grossed $34 million, and was the leading radio maker in the country. By 1934, it had captured 30% of the domestic radio market.

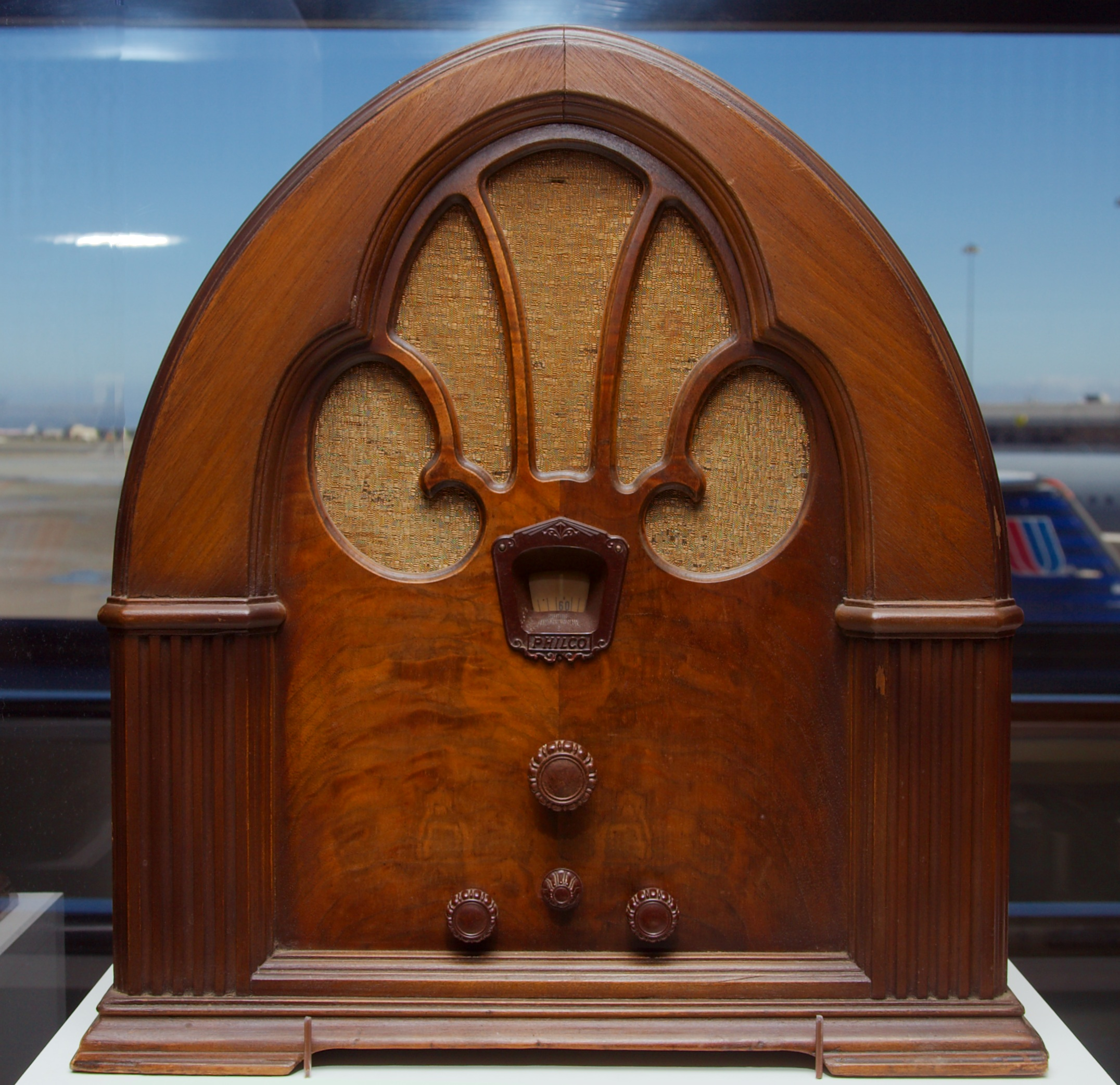
A Philco 90 "cathedral" style radio from 1931

Philco radios were economical without sacrificing quality or durability. Like other makers of the era, they offered a wide line of radios, beginning with five-tube sets all the way up to high-fidelity consoles with 20 tubes in 1937–1938. Philco also made battery-powered radios, then known as "farm radios", most of which had cabinets identical to their AC powered versions. The Philco "Baby Grand" (today called "cathedral" radios by collectors) featured an arched top. This was for economic reason partly, as one piece of wood formed both the top and sides. Philco sold far more of this style than any other maker, a total of over two million (in over twenty models, with from four to eleven tubes) from 1930 to 1938; many exist today in collections. By today's standards, most are still excellent performing AM band radios when restored.

A few of their innovations were very futuristic. From 1939 to 1941, Philco sold radios that were operated by wireless remote control, the one-tube "Mystery Control", used on their 13-tube model 116RX-SU (or 39-116). This feature was not offered by any other maker until the 1970s stereo receivers.

Philco ranked 57th among United States corporations in the value of World War II military production contracts.

Another interesting product was the Philco "Beam of Light" 78 rpm record players offered in 1941 and 1942. These had a tiny mirror attached to the player's needle. A beam of light was focused on the mirror, which caused a vibrating light to hit a photoelectric cell and produce the audio signal. While this system had some advantages over the standard crystal phono cartridge of the time, it was unreliable and is today very difficult to restore.

== Expansion ==
In 1941, in response to outside needs for personnel skilled in electronics, Philco founded a training and installation organization that evolved into its TechRep division, with hundreds of personnel styled as Field Engineers or TechReps in positions worldwide. This division later became the foundation for the Ford Aerospace organization.

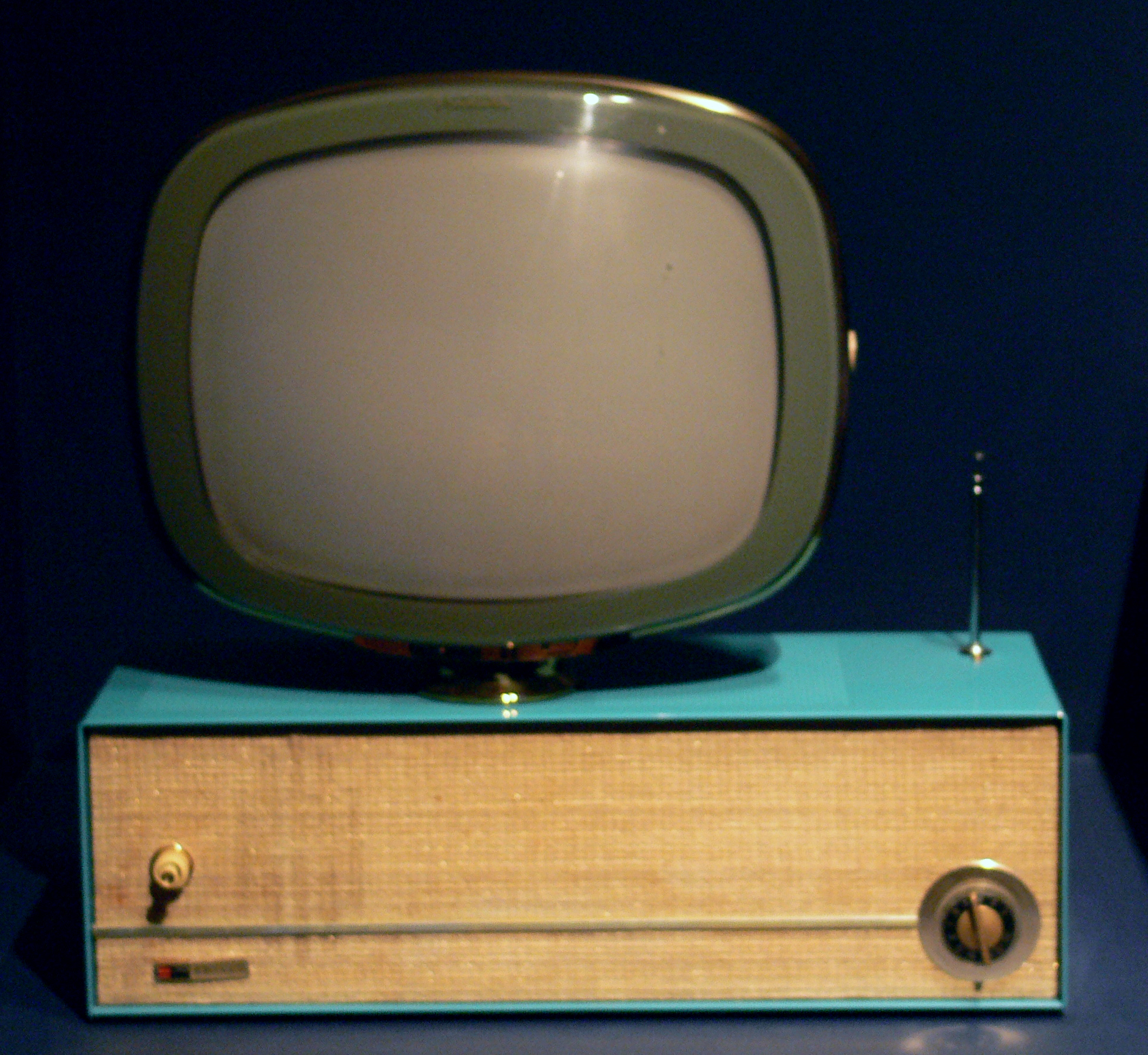
Philco Predicta TV set, 1958/1959 (Dallas Museum of Art)

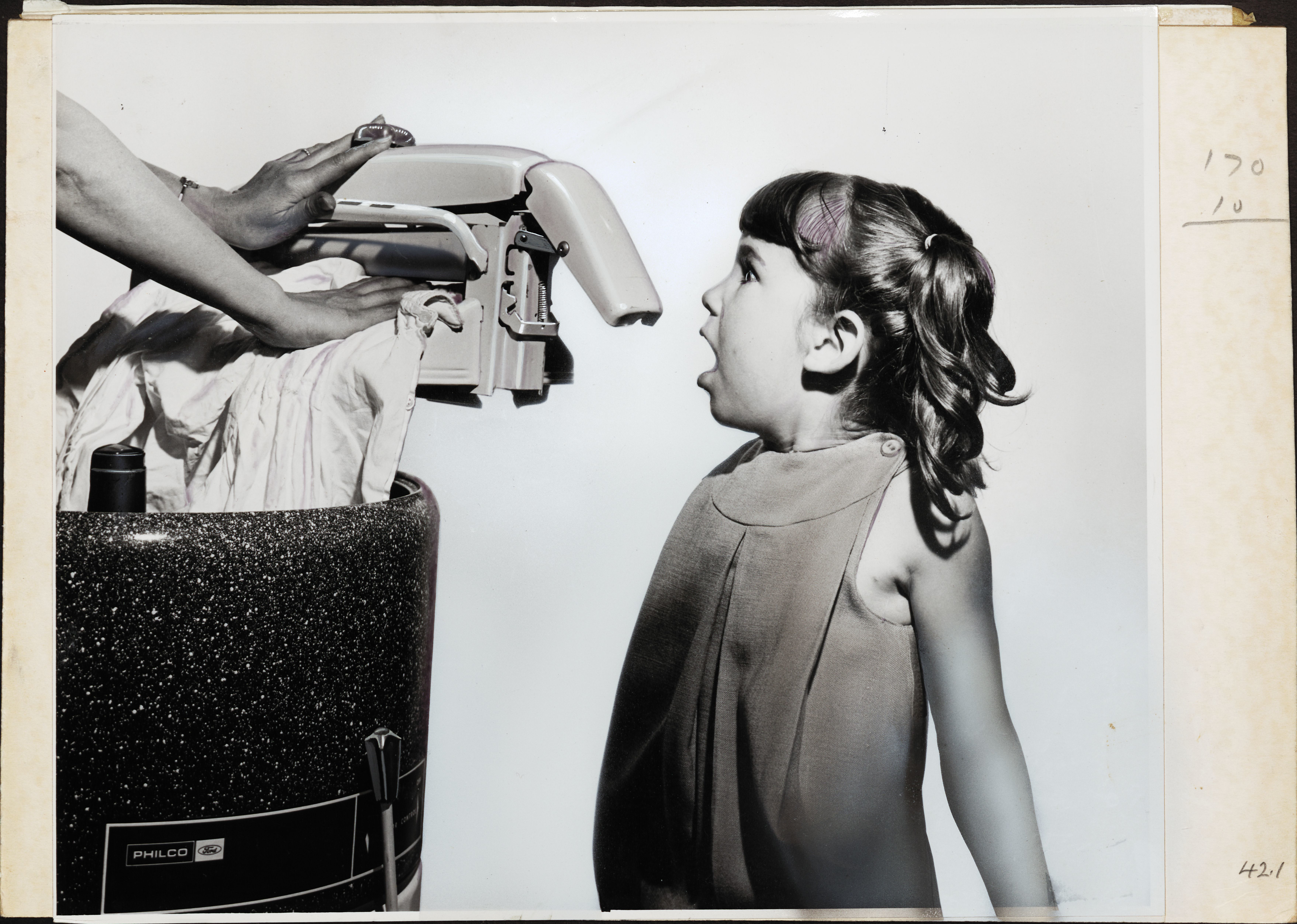
Vintage Philco wringer washing machine, tested in 1969

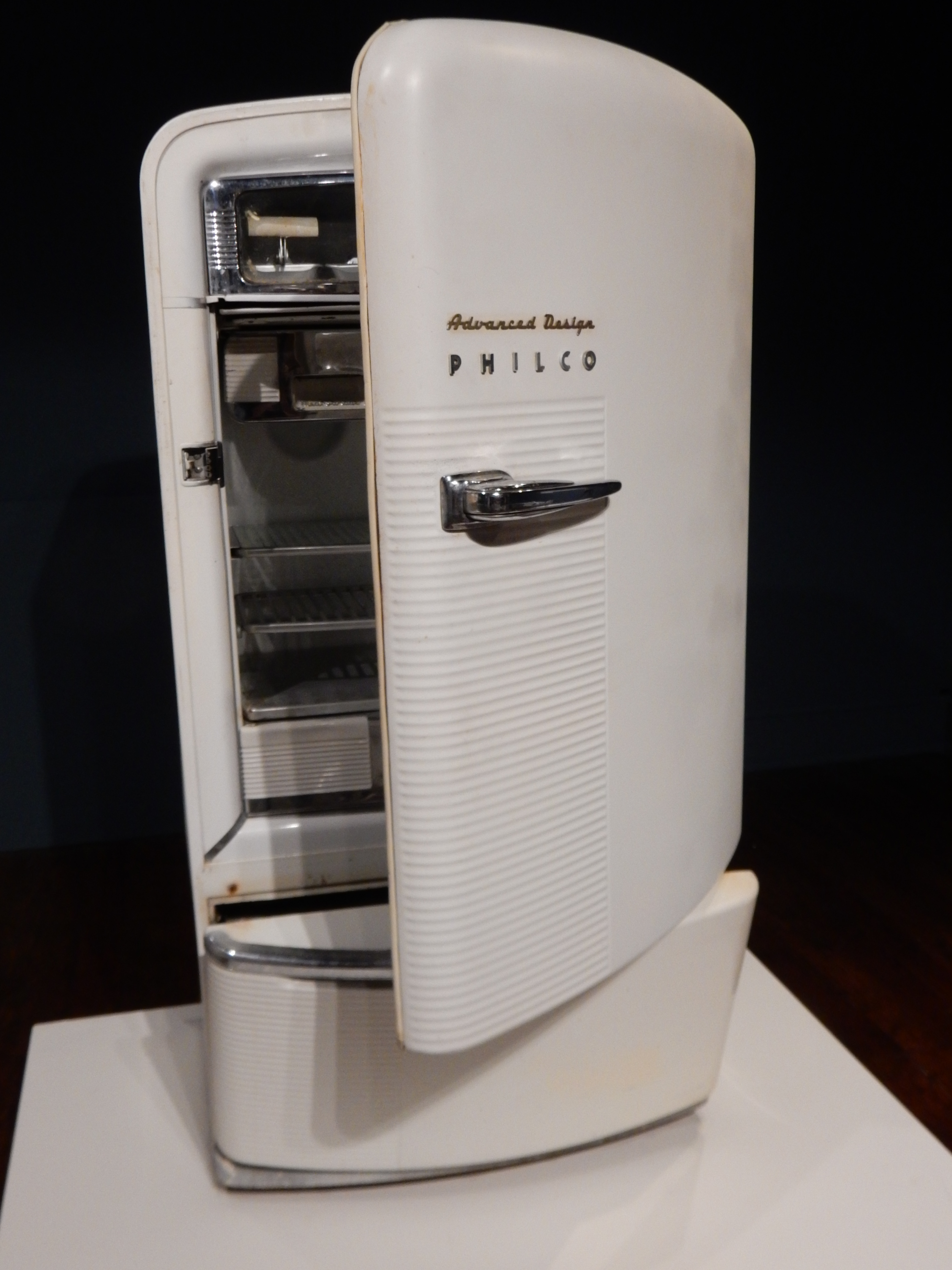
Philco Advanced Design Conservador, 1939

Philco began marketing car radios in 1930 and later expanded into other areas including air conditioners (1938), refrigerators (1939), home freezers (1946), consumer televisions (1947), electric ranges (1949), home laundry washers and dryers (1954), and home entertainment products. Their first consumer television set, the 1948 table Model 48-1000, had a 10 in (25 cm) black-and-white screen and sold for US$395 ($4,736 in 2025).

By 1954, Philco had led the radio industry in sales volume for 24 straight years, selling over 30 million radios.

Philco was also a pioneer in television broadcasting, launching experimental station W3XE in Philadelphia in 1932. In 1941, the station became the third commercially licensed TV operation in the United States as WPTZ. It was sold to Westinghouse Broadcasting in 1953 and became KYW-TV, a CBS owned and operated station.

The Philco Predicta TV set was introduced in 1957 for the 1958 model year. It was a black-and-white television with the picture tube mounted in a unique steerable pod on a pedestal. There were many versions: 17" or 21" picture tubes, wood or metal cabinets and table or floor standing versions, some with rare UHF tuners. Its specially designed, high-deflection-angle (to achieve a shallow front-to-back depth) picture tube turned out to be unreliable, and cost the company dearly in repairs and reputation. The 1959 model included a console and a table model. Many of them were sold to motels and bars due to the convenience of the swivel tube arrangement. It was discontinued in 1960; a disappointing failure for Philco. Due to the unique design, the Predicta is a collector's favorite and restored examples can easily be found.

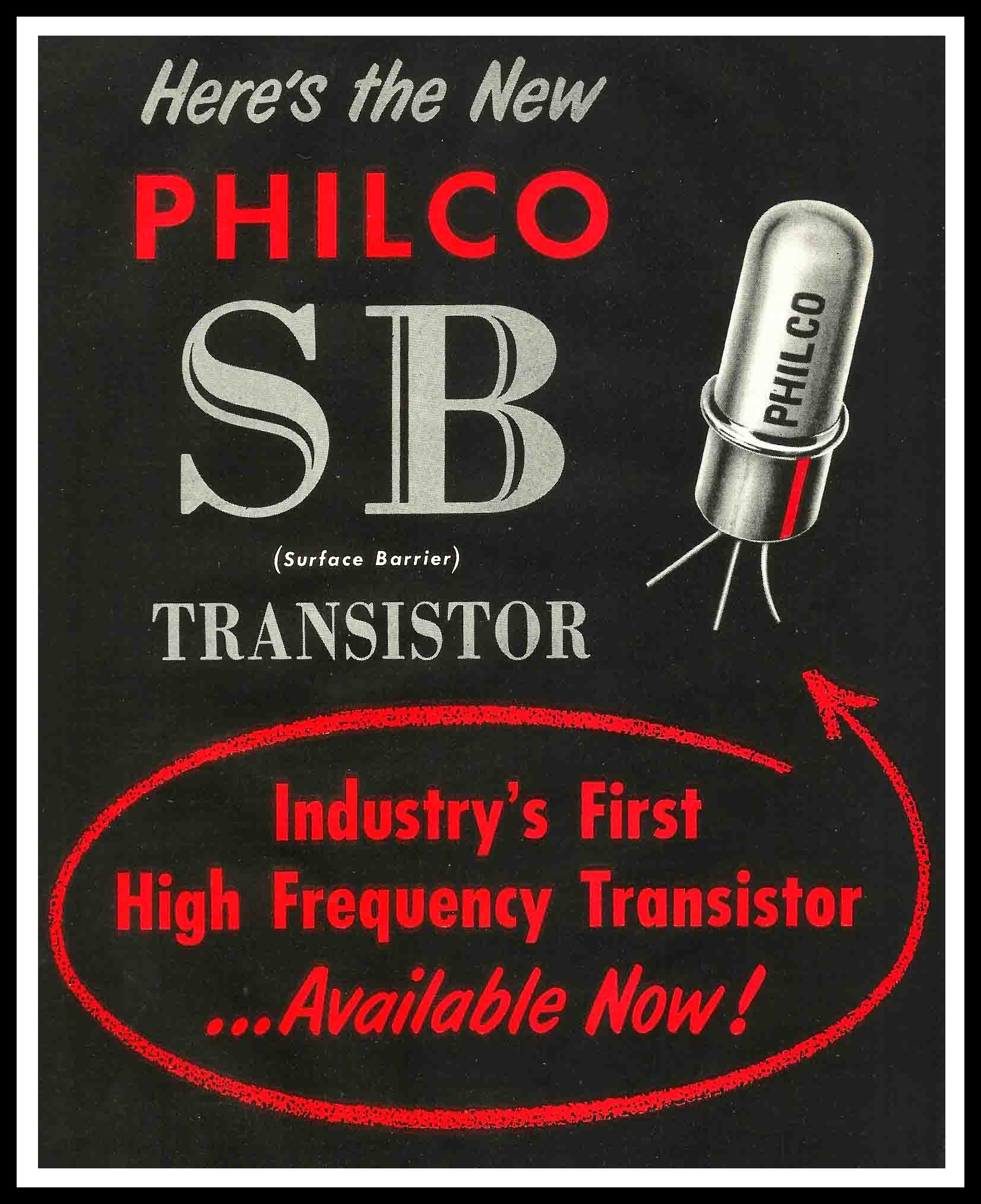
Philco Surface Barrier transistor announcement

=== Transistor research and product development ===
In late 1953, engineers at Philco Corporation invented the surface-barrier transistor, the first high frequency transistor suitable for use in high speed computers. Philco Corporation had produced a late 1950s production film about its surface-barrier transistor manufacturing processes and product developments that was titled, "Philco Transistors – The Tiny Giants Of The Future".

A May 1954 news article describes Philco's development of a pre-production indium-coated transistor that used silicon instead of germanium that relied on further improvements in silicon refinement to bring to production.

In June 1955, the National Security Agency and the United States Navy entered into a contract with Philco to build a specialized scientific transistorized computer based on Philco's surface barrier transistor technology. The project was called SOLO, since the idea was to have powerful personal workstations, and the computer was later commercially named the Philco Transac S-1000. The SOLO transistorized large scale scientific computer was finally built and delivered to the National Security Agency in November 1957. Philco also entered into a contract with the U.S. Navy's David Taylor Basin Research Division in 1955, to build a larger scale fully transistorized computer using its surface-barrier transistor technology, which was named the CPXQ model and later became the Philco Transac S-2000.

Philco had developed and produced a miniature transistorized computer brain for the Navy's jet fighter planes in 1955 and it was called the "Transac" (C-1000, C-1100), which had stood for "Transistor Automatic Computer." The Philco Transac computer brain had used its high-frequency surface-barriers transistors in the circuitry design.

1955 Chrysler – Philco all transistor car radio – "Breaking News" radio broadcast announcement

Chrysler and Philco announced that they had developed and produced the world's first all-transistor car radio and it was announced in the April 28, 1955, edition of the Wall Street Journal. Chrysler made the all-transistor car radio, Mopar model 914HR, available in Fall 1955 for its new line of 1956 Chrysler and Imperial cars, as a $150 option ($1,803 in 2025). Philco's radio manufacturing plant in Sandusky, Ohio, had produced the all-transistor car radio unit for the Chrysler Corporation, which also used Philco's surface-barrier transistors in its circuitry design.

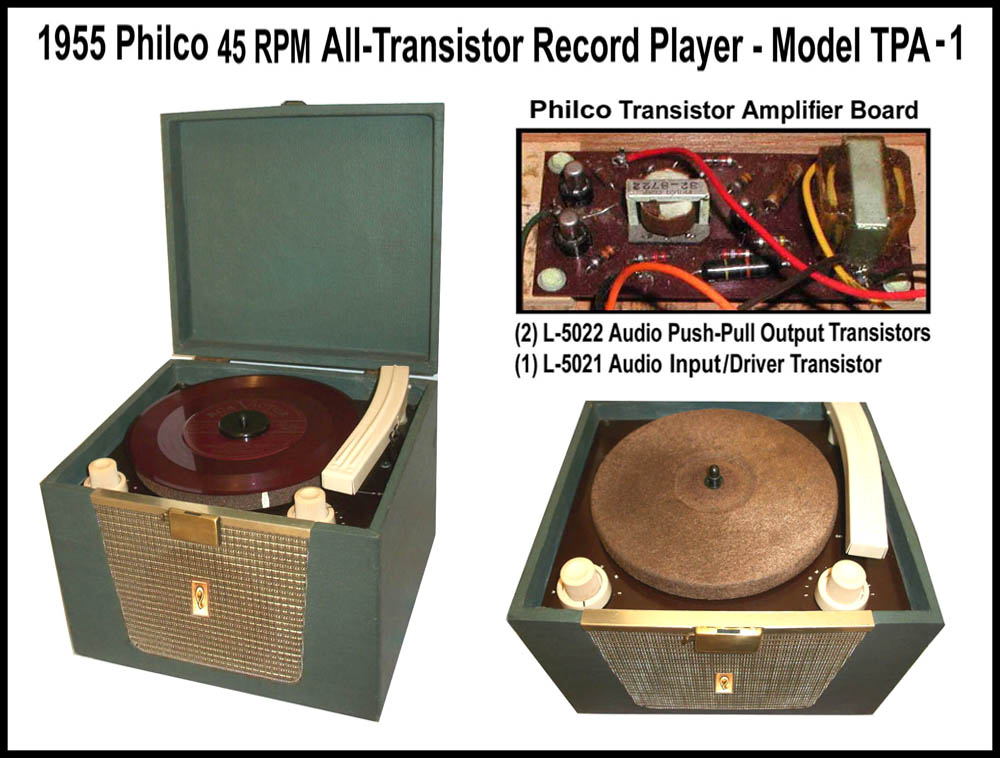
Philco all-transistor model TPA-1 phonograph, developed and produced by Philco in 1955

In 1955, Philco developed and produced the first all-transistor phonograph models TPA-1 and TPA-2. This was announced in the June 28, 1955, edition of the Wall Street Journal. Philco had begun selling these phonographs in the fall of 1955 for $59.95 ($720.50 in 2025). The October 1955 issue of Radio & Television News magazine (page 41) printed a full-page, detailed article, on Philco's new consumer phonograph. The Philco all-transistor portable phonograph TPA-1 and TPA-2 models played only 45 rpm records and used four 1.5v "D" batteries for its power supply. "TPA" stands for "Transistor Phonograph Amplifier". Its circuitry used three Philco germanium PNP alloy-fused junction audio frequency transistors. After the 1956 season ended, Philco discontinued the all-transistor portable 45 rpm phonograph models, for transistors were too expensive compared to vacuum tubes.

The Philco Transac models S-1000 scientific computer and S-2000 electronic data processing computer, were the first commercially produced large-scale all transistor computers, which were introduced in 1957. It used discrete surface barrier transistors instead of vacuum tubes (the integrated circuit had not yet been invented). It also used a fast adder, invented by Bruce Gilchrist, James H. Pomerene and Y.K. Wong of the Institute for Advanced Study. It incorporated a speed-up technique for asynchronous adders reducing the time for additive carry-overs to propagate.

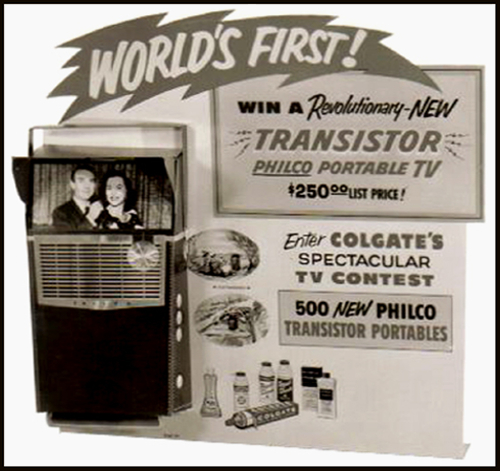
Actual store easel display of a 1959 Philco Safari Transistorized portable TV

In 1959, Philco developed and produced the first battery-powered portable transistorized TV. This TV model was called the "Safari" and contained 21 transistors. Philco had developed the VHF micro-alloy diffused transistor (MADT) and used them in the Safari portable TV. The retail selling price was $250.00 ($2,761 in 2025) plus the cost of the rechargeable battery, which was $5.25 extra ($57.98 in 2025).

In 1962, the Philco 2000 Model 212 computer was chosen for use in the North American Aerospace Defense Command's famous Cheyenne Mountain Complex. Three of them were installed that year and ran until 1980. They were also used by research labs at Westinghouse Electric and General Electric.

=== Space systems ===
In 1960, the Courier 1B, built by Philco, became the first active repeater satellite. Courier 1B was built by the Western Development Labs (WDL) division of Philco, previously known as "Army Fort Monmouth Laboratories" (Fort Monmouth).

In 1960, NASA contracted with Philco to build the worldwide tracking station network for Project Mercury, and all subsequent man-in-space space projects until the ground station network was replaced by the TDRS communication satellites in the 1990s. Philco's Western Development Labs ultimately became Space Systems/Loral, which continues to manufacture spacecraft. In later years, the company produced automotive electronic controls, aerospace tracking systems, and artificial satellites.

In 1963, Philco was also responsible for the design, manufacturing, installation, and service of all the consoles used in both Mission Operations Control Rooms (a.k.a. Mission Control) at Building 30 of NASA's Lyndon B. Johnson Space Center in Houston, Texas. Philco technical representatives worked with NASA staff to design and integrate the consoles with NASA hardware and systems. The consoles were used for the Gemini, Apollo, Skylab, and Space Shuttle missions until 1998. The Philco-designed and installed consoles in Mission Control 2 at the Johnson Space Center have been preserved and will be restored to their Apollo-era configuration for historical purposes. The control room is listed in the National Register of Historic Places as the "Apollo Mission Control Center".

=== Water purification systems ===
In 1971, Philco-Ford began to sell reverse osmosis-based water purification systems that used tube-shaped membranes developed by the company to filter and desalinate raw polluted water for municipal utilities and manufacturing.

== Demise ==
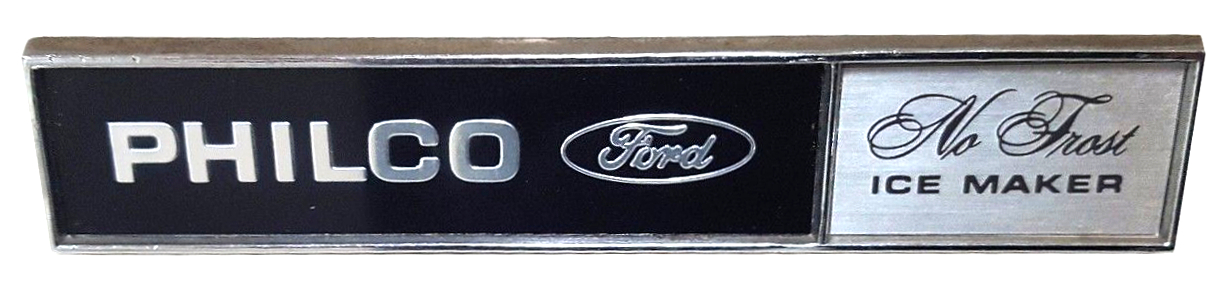
Refrigerators branded Philco-Ford appeared in 1966.

On December 11, 1961, Ford Motor Company purchased Philco and continued to offer consumer products, computer systems and defense related projects. The company, which had supplied Ford with some of its car radios as early as the 1930s, continued to provide Ford with car and truck radio receivers; consumer product investments were also made to color television production. Along with color and black and white television, Philco continued to produce refrigerators, washers, dryers, air conditioners, stoves, radios, portable transistor radios, portable phonographs, console audio systems with high quality "Mastercraft" furniture cabinets, and component stereo systems.

The company branded Philco products as "Philco-Ford" in 1966, and console stereo systems reached their zenith during 1966 and 1967, with high quality cabinet construction and powerful stereo chassis systems of 100- and 300-watt consoles. Philco at one time was one of the largest furniture producers in the world, but the end was near for "high quality" furniture cabinets along with stereo equipment. Solid wood cabinets with veneers were replaced with cheaper wood composites covered in vinyl paper and plastic wood pieces. The quality electronic systems that had been built in the United States were replaced with new designs and systems, engineered and built at a plant owned by Philco-Taiwan. Eventually, all consumer electronic goods would be made by Philco-Taiwan, to lower costs of production and be more competitive in the market. The prevailing industry trend was to move consumer electronic manufacturing to Asia in order to lower the cost of labor and production, and Philco-Ford was no exception to this. Heavy consumer goods (major appliances) such as refrigerators, air conditioners and washer-dryers continued to be built in the United States, along with television receivers.

Ford dropped the computer business a few years into its ownership of the company.

In 1973, a complete line of breakthrough refrigerators was introduced, consisting of eight side-by-side "Cold Guard" models, which used about one-third less electricity than comparable competitive makes. But by January 1974, Ford was eager to rid itself of the home products in Philco's lines, which was not doing well. Negotiations with appliance maker White Consolidated Industries (WCI) started in January, but were called off in March. By September, Ford and GTE Sylvania – Philco's largest competitor – announced the sale of the non-automotive parts of the business, with the exception of the new refrigerator range, which Ford also kept. The deal closed on December 11.

In 1977, GTE sold Philco International to earlier suitor White Consolidated Industries. (In 1986, WCI was bought by AB Electrolux.)

The company (as well as the Sylvania brand name) was acquired from GTE by Philips (NAP) in 1981 so that NAP could use its trademark in the United States. Philco had been able to keep NAP from using its trademark because of the similar-sounding names, so NAP had sold its products in the United States under the name "Norelco". In 1987, NAP became a wholly owned subsidiary of Dutch electronics company Philips. Philips later used the Philco name for promotional consumer electronics and licensed the name for private brands and retro-style consumer electronics. Philips also licensed the Philco brand name to Funai for digital converter boxes for analog TVs in the USA. As of September 2019, the US website is no longer functioning.

== Non-U.S. branding ==
European logo

South American logo

Brazilian logo

In April 1959, Thorn Electrical Industries acquired the Philco business in the UK.

In Brazil, Philco (then Philco-Hitachi) was acquired in 1989 by Itautec, becoming Itautec-Philco and in August 2005 Itautec sold Philco to Gradiente. In August 2007, Gradiente sold the brand to a group of investors, who intended to license the brand to Brazilian appliance maker Britânia.

In 2003, the Merloni Group acquired rights to the Philco brand (from Philco International) for use in Italy. The Italian Philco produces household appliances in affiliation with ex-Bendix Corporation and Thorn EMI Moyor Electronics (e.g. Bendix 71258 1000 automatic washing machine 1986). As of 2006, the company is mainly known in Australia.

In Argentina, in March 2004, Philco was acquired by a group of Argentine investors. The presence of Philco in Argentina dates from 1930 and remains a traditional mark of appliances in this country. It manufactures refrigerators by Helametal Catamarca S.A. (Philco Argentina). All the line electronics, LCD TV, Car Stereos, Air Conditioning, MWO, Audio & DVD, is represented by Newsan SA SANYO and DatandHome SA, with the line of washing machines, dishwashers, air conditioning, water heaters, also the same group.

In Chile, the brand belongs to Fuji Corp S.A., a company that markets speakers, headphones, accessories for audio, TV and telephony, as well as appliances and electrical items, under this brand.

In Italy, Philco brand televisions were produced during the 1980s by Imperial Electronics of Milan.

== See also ==
- The Philco Television Playhouse
