= Mountain soap =

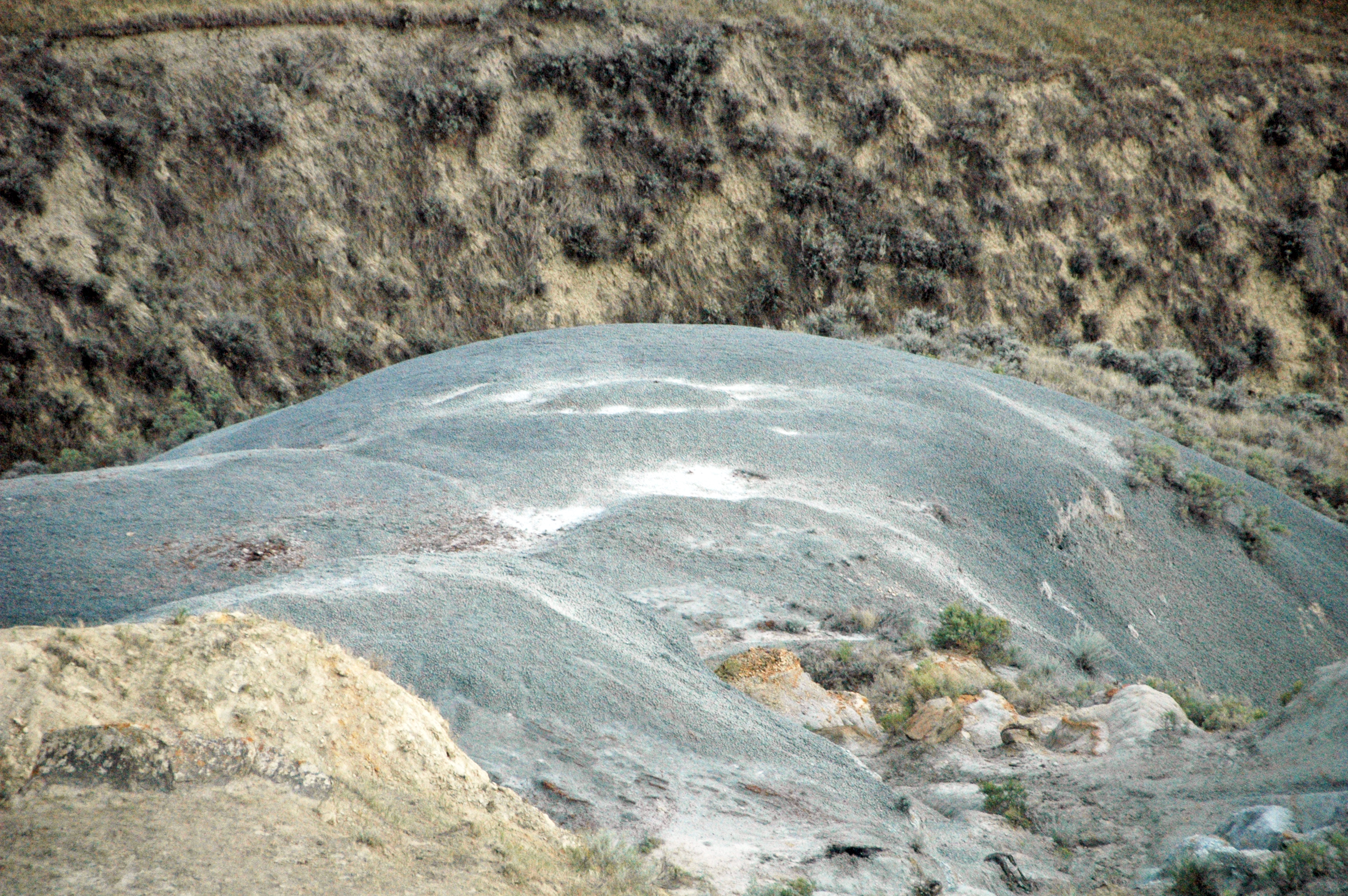
- Mountain Soap, bentonite (North Dakota)

General
- Category: Minerals

Mountain soap (Latin: Argilla saponiformis, German: Bergseife, French: Savon de montagne), rock-soap or bolus — a partially outdated trivial name for a large group of clay minerals similar in properties from the group of hydrous layered aluminum silicates with variable composition. Minerals from the mountain soap group contain primarily silicates (44-46%), alumina (17-26%), iron oxides (6-10%) and water (13-25%). The mountain soap group included at different times up to two dozen mineral species and varieties. In different cases, this name could mean different minerals, most often halloysite (from the proper name), saponite (soapstone), bentonite or montmorillonite (from the French: Montmorillon, toponym). The last mineral is a large group, each of which could be called mountain soap. All these minerals received their common colloquial name, which gradually penetrated into mineralogy, for their ability to lather and serve as a detergent for various purposes.

Mountain soap has some common properties that are characteristic of all minerals included in the group. All of them have very low hardness (from 1 to 2 on the Mohs scale) and are a typical weathering product of aluminosilicates. In the form of its main component (bentonite, which is formed during the weathering of volcanic rocks — tuffs and ash), mountain soap is one of the main minerals in many types of soils, and it is also found in many sedimentary rocks. Thanks to its layered "batch" structure, mountain soap has the ability to absorb water, swell strongly and has pronounced sorption properties.

== Name ==
The name "mountain soap" is not so much a metaphor, which is quite often found in mineralogy, as a simple statement of the soapy properties of the mineral, as well as the systematic use that it has had for thousands of years. This mineral is named mountain soap, on account of its greasiness, sectility, and softness. On the one hand, this type of clay received its trivial name from its property of softening in water and forming with it a viscous and greasy substance to the touch, similar to thickly diluted soap. On the other hand, for a very long time, the population that had access to deposits of such clays systematically used it as a detergent for various purposes: from waulking cloth, canvas and wool to washing hands, face and hair in the bathhouse. From the combination of two factors inherent in all these varieties, other synonymous names also follow under which washing clays are found. In the literature of the 18th and 19th centuries, mountain soap can be found under the names: soapy earth, soapy clay, soapstone or bolus.

The conventional scientific use of the collective term "mountain soap" generally ended by the last quarter of the 19th century, giving way to individual names of the minerals included in this conventional group. Currently, the term is considered completely outdated and does not appear as such even in the latest mineralogical dictionaries.

== Properties ==
Mountain soap has the same properties as one of its main varieties: bentonite or montmorillonite. This is a typical clay mineral belonging to the subclass of layered silicates, due to its structure it has the ability to swell strongly. In addition, mountain soap has pronounced sorption properties. The modern use of bentonites in industrial production, construction and even as a food additive is based on their high thermal stability, binding ability, as well as catalytic and adsorption activity.

Old authors of the 18th-19th centuries, describing the properties of mountain soap, unanimously note that it is opaque, not sticky, convenient for writing, and also soft when wetted, lathers well and sticks strongly to the tongue. It feels greasy and light. In composition (according to Buchholz's analysis) it contains 44% silica, 26.5% alumina, about 20.5% water, 8% iron oxides and 0.5-1% calcium compounds (lime). Naturally, the results of chemical analysis relate exclusively to the specific variety on which laboratory operations were carried out. In all other cases, both the percentage composition of the substances that make up the clay and the set of impurities may differ significantly from the proposed ratio. Nevertheless, this analysis is quite indicative in general for that mineral group that can be described as "mountain soaps".

Being in damp soil or being moistened, mountain soap becomes completely soft and similar to butter, but when it dries in dry weather in the air or when heated, it hardens. Chemical stability and even some inertness of mountain soap are also noted; even in strong acids, for example, sulfuric, hydrochloric or nitric, no visible change or any other signs of a chemical reaction occur with it.

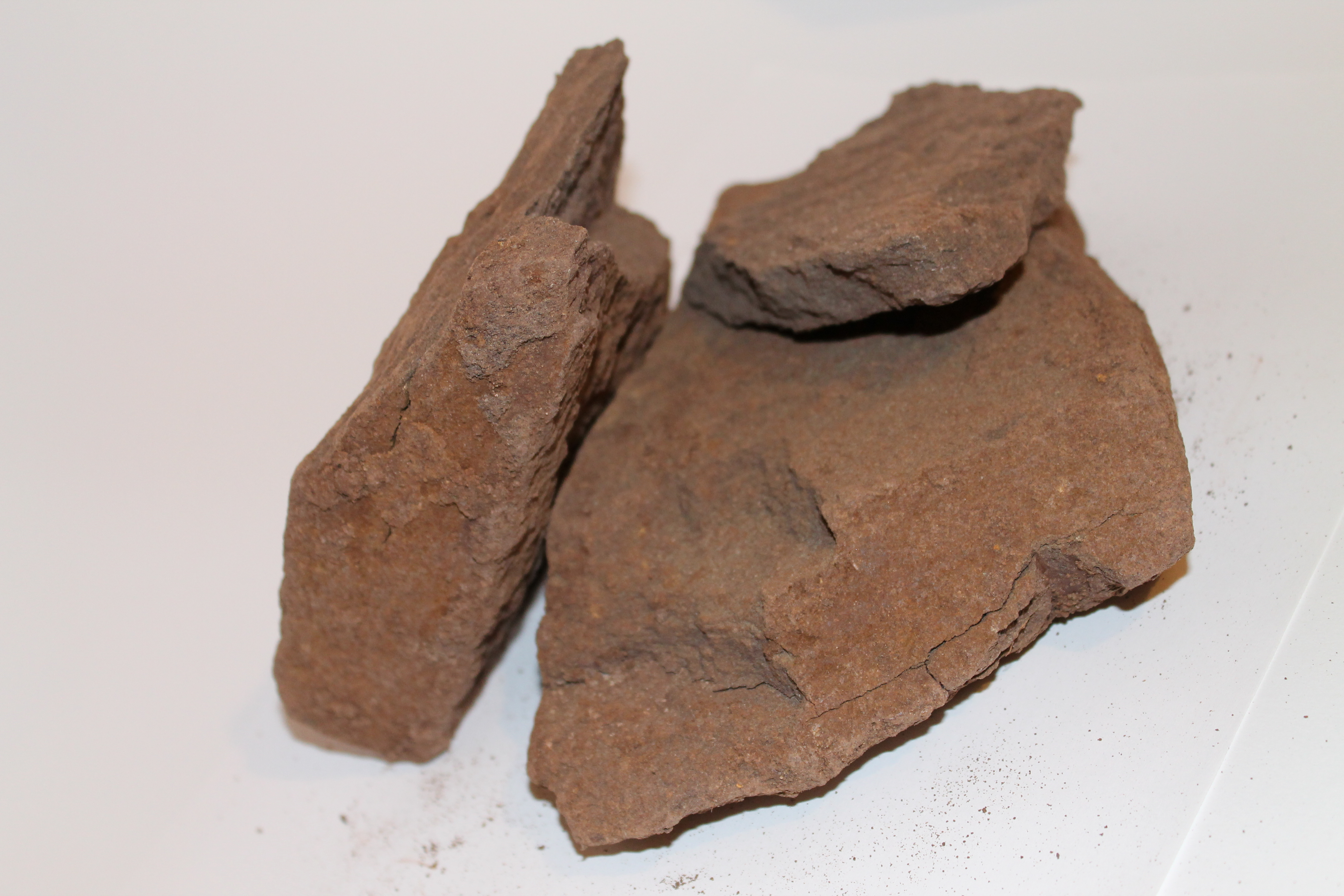
Saponite (Ukraine)

The authors differ significantly more regarding the color of the clays. If Johann Gottgelf von Waldheim unequivocally states that mountain soap "has a light pitch-black color", Pavel Goryaninov practically confirm his opinion, assuring that it is "black-brown in color", and Robert Jameson confirms this information, however then other authors are much less categorical. The Mining Journal for 1926 writes that "this soap has different colors, but more greenish and yellow", and Grigory Spassky in the Mining Dictionary of 1843 summarizes: "its color is generally white, turning into dark brown, bluish and yellowish".

It is clear that the specific characteristics of mountain soap are associated, first of all, with the breadth of coverage of regional forms and varieties that a particular author included in his review. In particular, Spassky separately mentions that the external properties of mountain soap, used in the Kazan and Irkutsk governorates, and especially in the Crimea under the name kil, are generally similar to those described here, however, the chemical composition of each of these differences has not yet been precisely determined.

Pavel Ogorodnikov writes about exactly the same thing in his memoir "Essays on Persia", of course, without mentioning the exact names and chemical terms. Talking about his travels through Northern Iran, he notices that different types of fatty clay, which replaces soap for the poor population when washing clothes, are found in abundance in all the nearby mountains. For example, grayish clay, sold at the local market for 1,80 rub. and more expensive per halvar, mined mainly between the villages of Tash and Mujen, and cheaper, yellowish (90 kopecks per halvar) — in the surrounding mountains of the village of Taal-Saab-abad. Asterabad residents wash their clothes mainly with Gilaser clay, which is abundant in the Asterabad mountains. In addition, the Shahrud people also use Semnon clay, which comes from the city of Semnon, which lies on the way from Shahrud to Tehran. This particularly expensive and probably high quality clay sells for 9 rub. for halvar, used exclusively by women when washing their hair in the bathhouse.

== Gallery ==
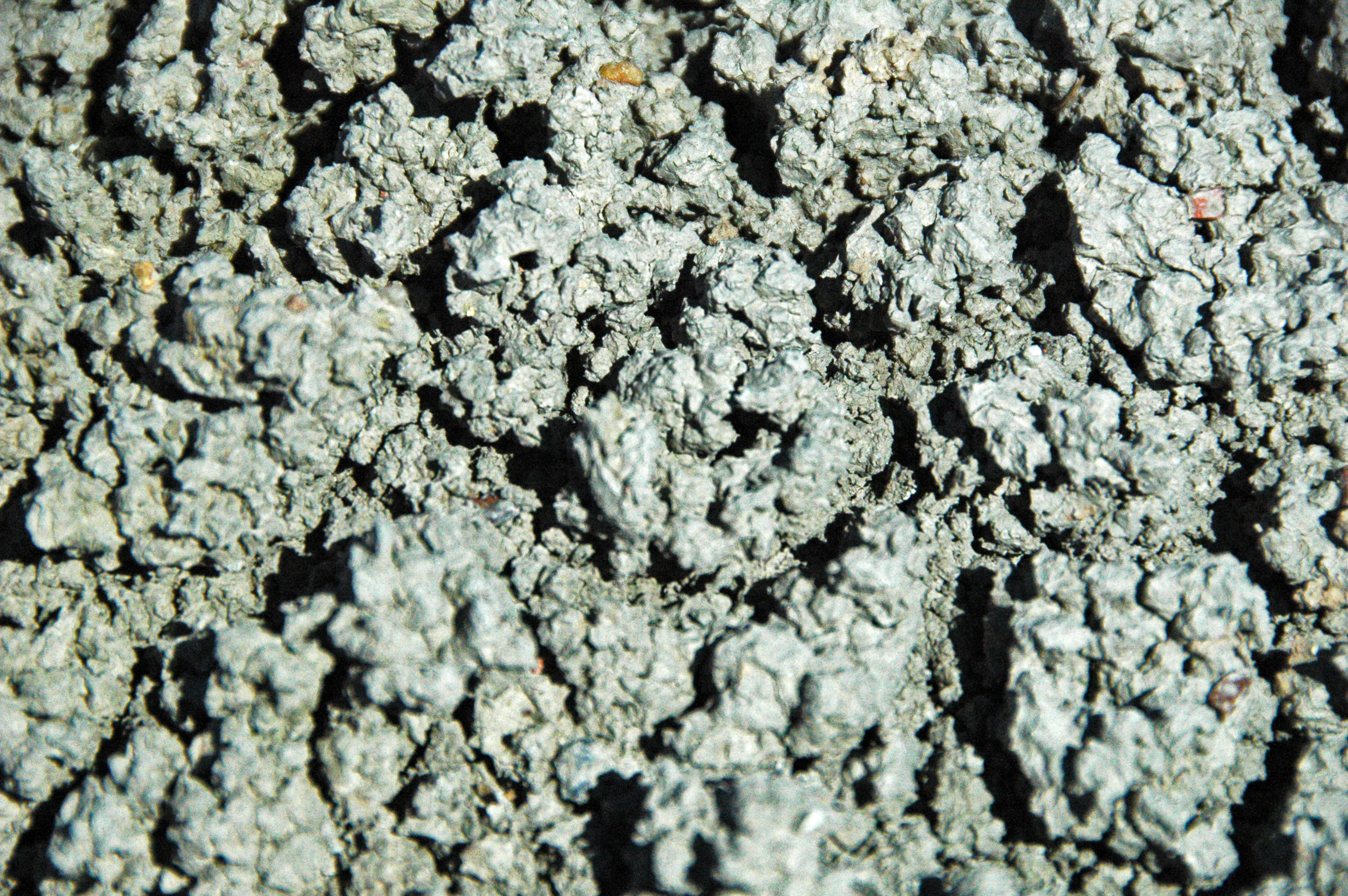
Bentonite

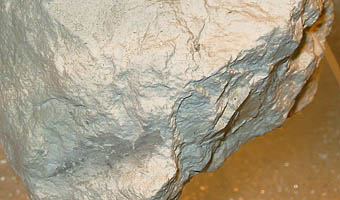
Halloysite

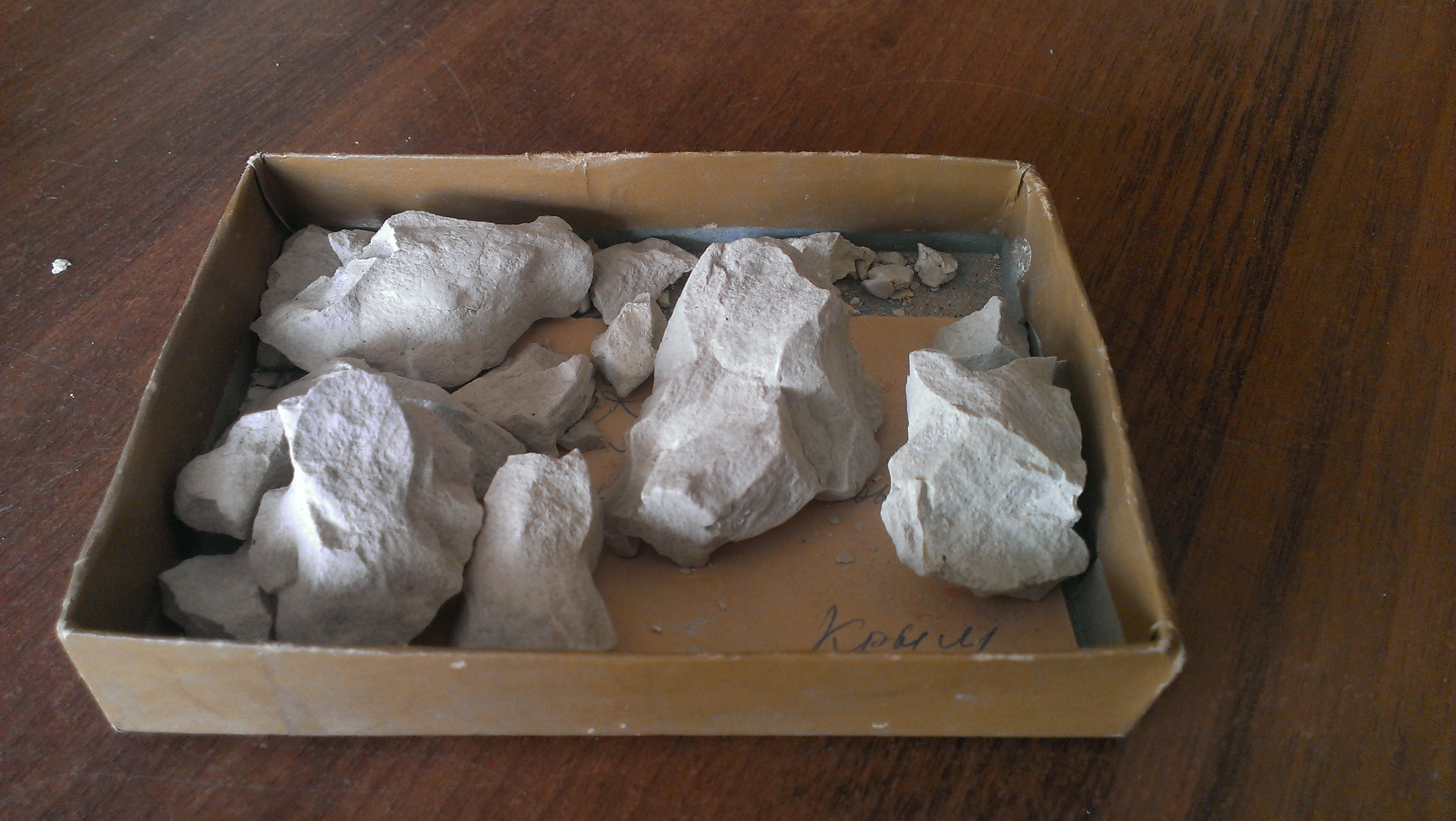
Kil

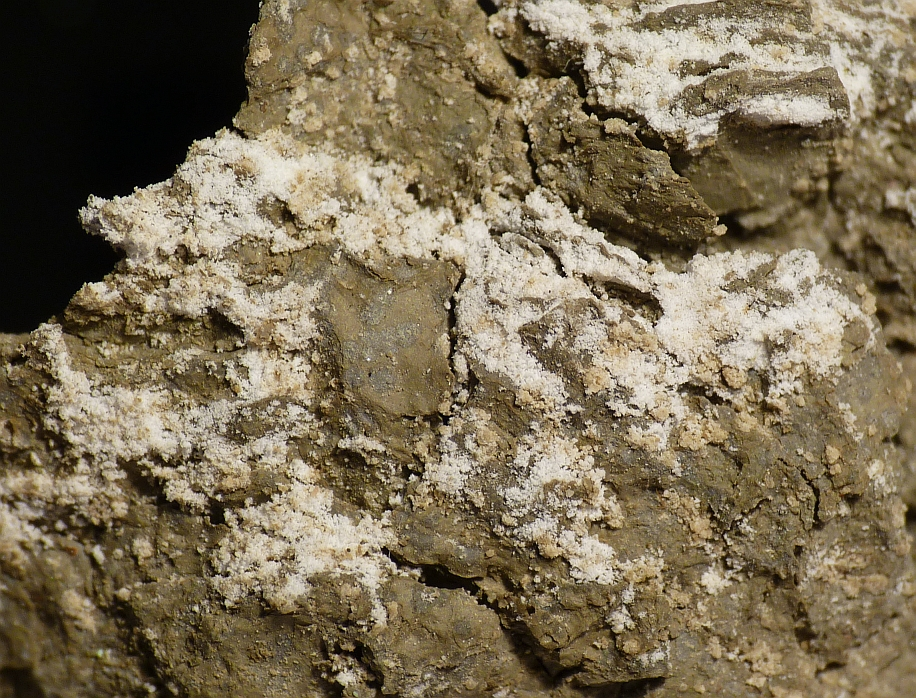
Montmorillonite

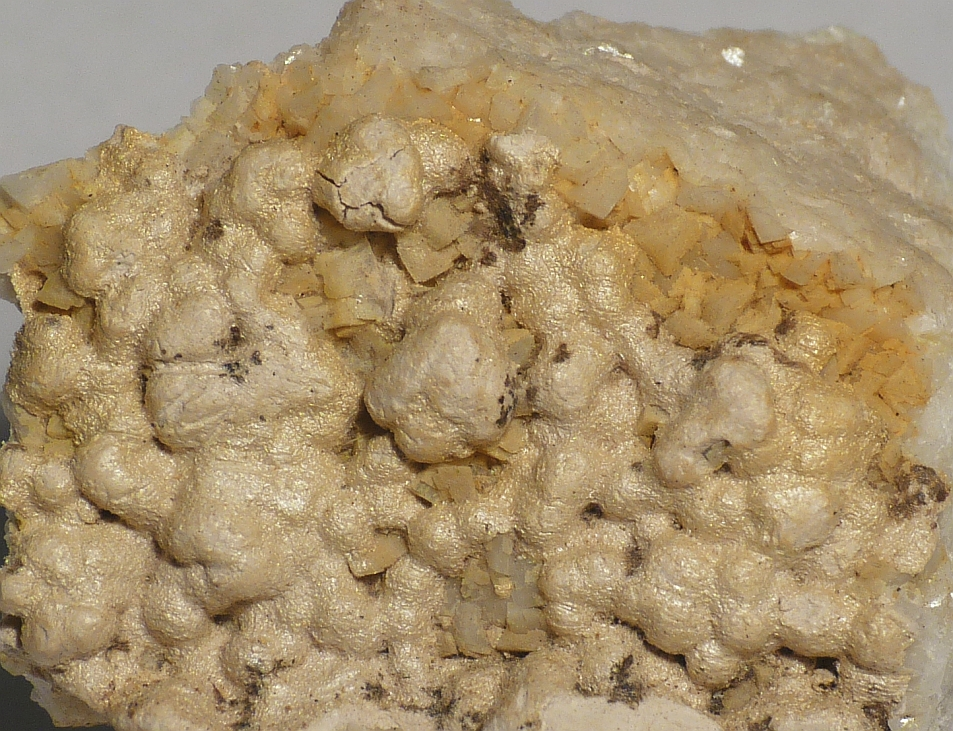
Saponite

== See also ==
- Mountain (disambiguation)
- Soap (disambiguation)
- Kaolinite
- Clay
