= Predicta =

Type of television set made by Philco

Philco Predicta television set
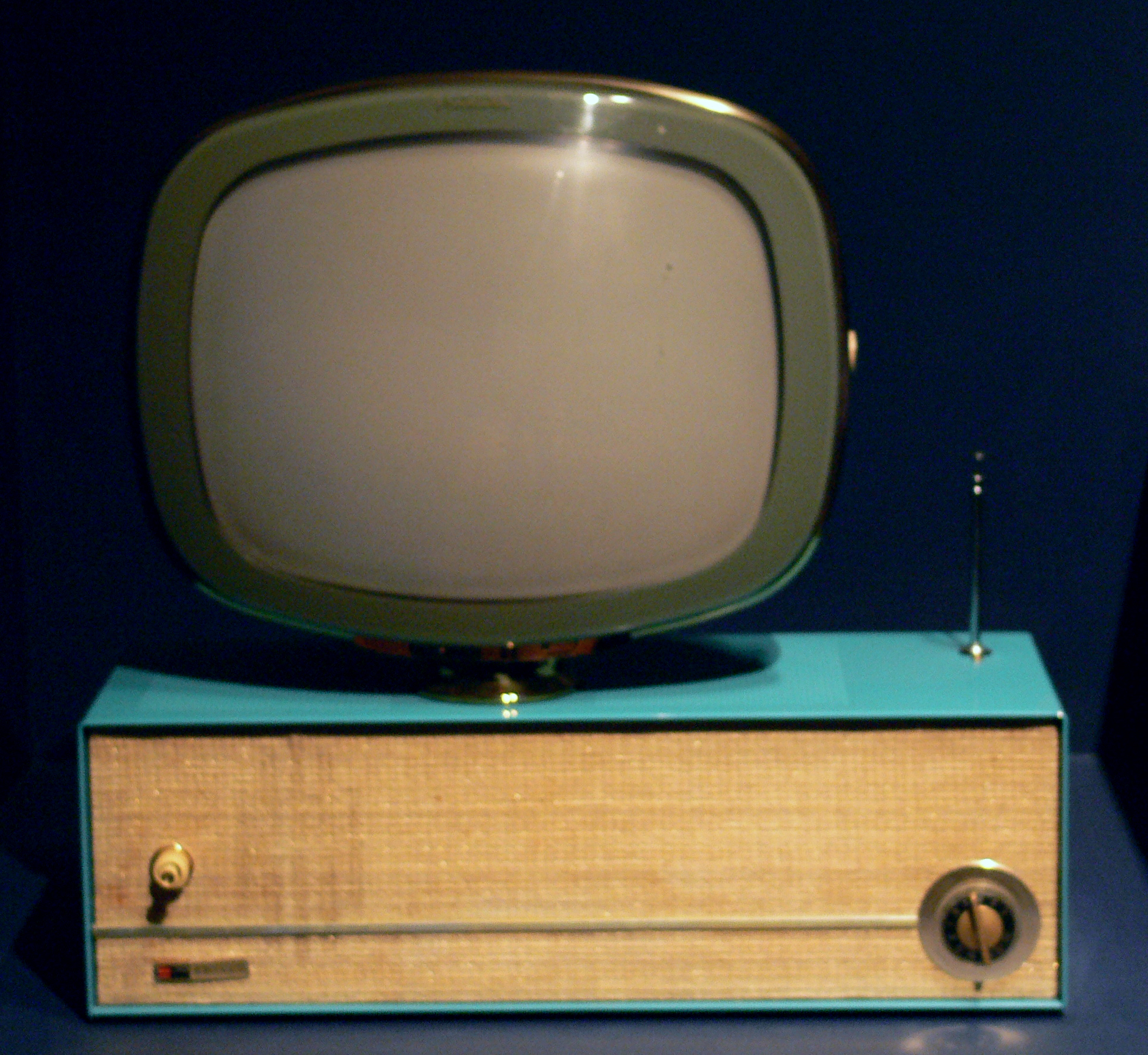
- Predicta from the collection of the Dallas Museum of Art
- Inception: 1958
- Manufacturer: Philco

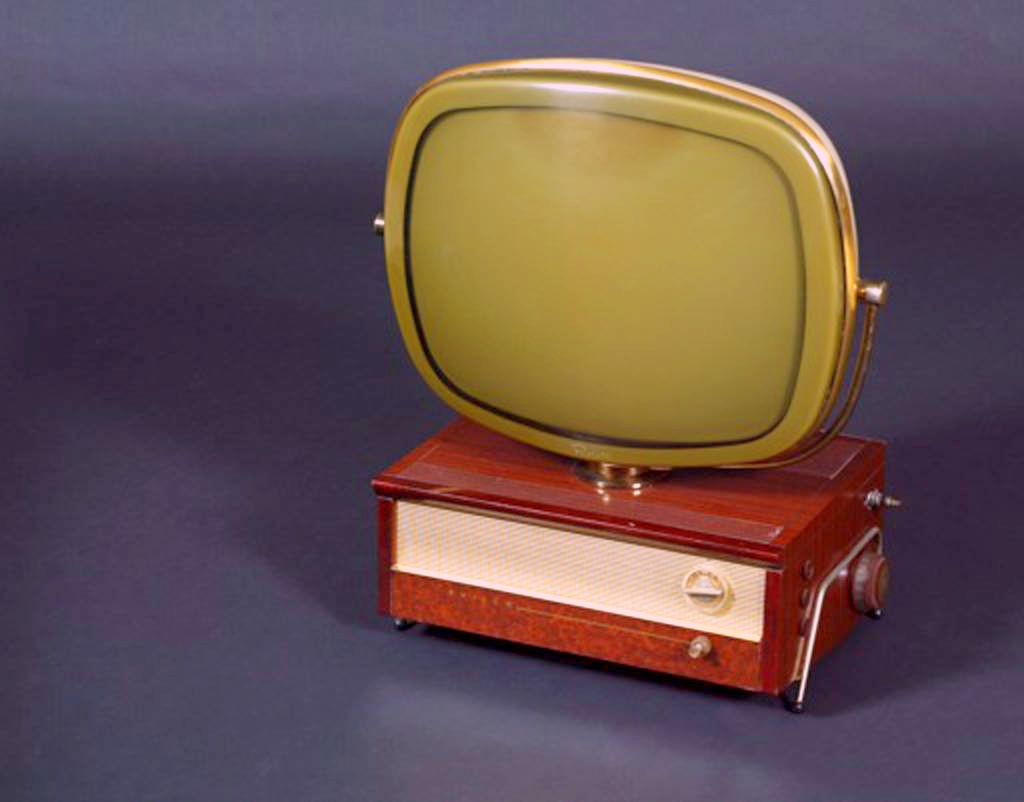
Philco Predicta from the collection of The Children's Museum of Indianapolis

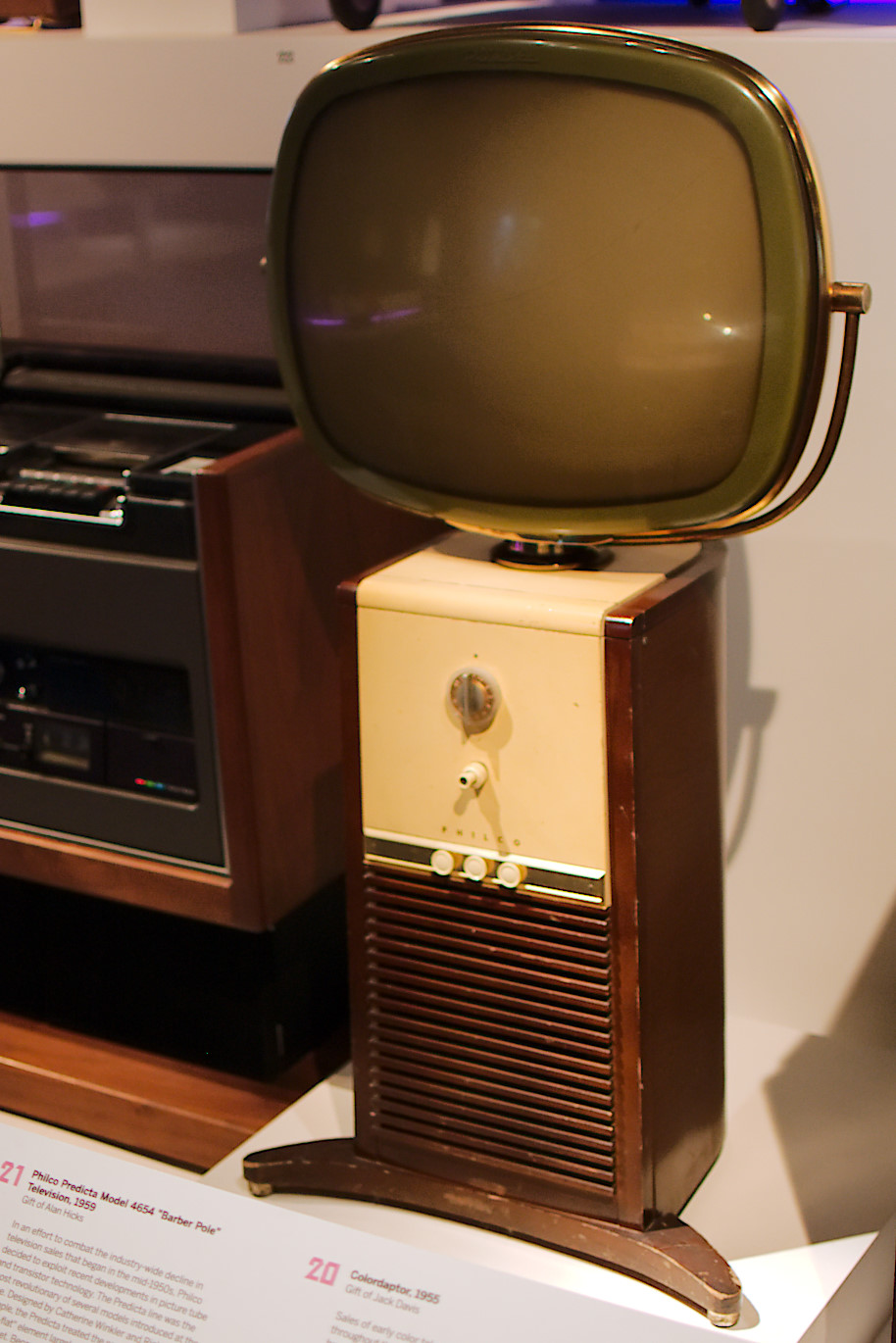
Predicta model 4654 with “barber pole” stand from the collection of the Museum of the Moving Image, New York

The Philco Predicta is a black and white television chassis style, which was made in several cabinet models with 17” or 21” screens by the American company Philco from 1958 to 1960. The Predicta was marketed as the world’s first swivel-screen television. Designed by Catherine Winkler, Severin Jonassen and Richard Whipple, it featured a picture tube (CRT) that separated from the rest of the cabinet.

The safety mask on the front of the picture tube was made with a new organic plastic product by Eastman Plastics called “tenite”, which protected the glass and provided implosion protection for the user and produced a greenish tint. The Predicta also had a thinner picture tube than many other televisions of its age, which led it to be marketed as a more futuristic television set.

Predicta television sets were constructed with a variety of cabinet configurations, some detachable but all separate from the tube itself and connected by wires.

As its manufacturer explained in mid-1959, “The world’s first separate screen receiver, Philco’s ‘Predicta,’ marked a revolution in the design and engineering of television sets. Announced in June 1958, ‘Predicta’ was made possible by the development of a shorter 21-inch picture tube called the “SF” tube (for ‘semi-flat’), and a newly-designed contour chassis....’Slender Seventeener’ portables in the ‘Predicta’ line are the thinnest and most compact portables on the market today.”

The Predicta Tandem model had a fully detached picture tube and an umbilical cable, which allowed the controls and speaker for the set to be next to the viewer, with the screen up to 25 feet away. Also unique to this version was a large handle over the top to carry the cathode ray tube portion wherever the viewer wanted it. This version also required more internal circuitry to drive the video signal through the cable.

Philco also made Directa, a short-lived remote series in 1959 before the firm was bought by the Ford Motor Company in 1961. This set feature provided Philco with an answer to the Zenith Space Command wireless remote control, which had been introduced the same year. The Predicta was announced to the industry in 1958, and launched to the public the following year at the 1959 Miss America pageant, which was sponsored by Philco.

Shortly after the Predicta was announced, its reliability was called into question by several trade and consumer publications. As Philco was phasing in its next chassis iteration, the Cool Chassis, the company went bankrupt, with its development of the Predicta being a possible factor. The company was acquired shortly afterward by Ford.

From 1997 to 2008, company Telstar made reproductions of several Predicta models, as well as introducing some new ones, all featuring color CRTs and taking advantage of advances in technology.

== In popular culture ==
The Pixar animated film Toy Story 2 featured a miniature replica of the Predicta, which was based on one owned by the film's director, John Lasseter.

The Predicta is also featured in The Marvelous Mrs. Maisel series on Amazon Prime.

A (non-existent/simulated) color version of the Predicta TV appears in the first episode of the second season of Mo.

The "Radiation King" televisions seen throughout the Fallout video games are based on the Predicta.
