= Mountain River =

A mountain river is a river that runs usually in mountains.

Mountain River may also refer to:

- Mountain River (Northwest Territories), a stream in Canada
- Mountain River, Tasmania, a settlement in Australia
- Mountain River (album), by Dou Wei
