= Mountain Music =

Mountain Music may refer to:

- Mountain Music (Alabama album), 1982
  - "Mountain Music" (song), the title track
- Mountain Music (Nina Nesbitt album), 2024
- Old-time music or "mountain music", a genre of North American folk music
- Mountain Music (film), a 1937 film featuring Arthur Hohl
- Mountain Music, a 1975 Claymation short film by Will Vinton

== See also ==
- Appalachian music, the traditional music of the American Appalachian Mountains region
