= Wife acceptance factor =

Colloquialism in consumer electronics

Wife acceptance factor, wife approval factor or Woman Acceptance Factor, or wife appeal factor (WAF) is an assessment of design elements that either increase or diminish the likelihood a wife will approve the purchase of expensive consumer electronics products such as high fidelity loudspeakers and home theater systems. WAF is a tongue-in-cheek play on electronics jargon such as "form factor" and "power factor" and derives from the stereotype that men are predisposed to appreciate gadgetry and performance criteria whereas women must be wooed by visual and aesthetic factors.

The term is considered a sexist term by some people, for example women in the high fidelity hobbyist community, who have stated the sexism in the community is reflected by use of the phrase WAF. Some people have used the non-gender-specific term significant other acceptance parameters (SOAP).

== History ==
=== Radio ===
At the start of the golden age of radio in the early 1920s, most radio broadcasters and listeners were men with technical skills. Covers of Radio News depicted humorous situations of women deploring their men's obsession with the new science. According to research by Michael Brown and Corley Dennison in 1998, women disliked homemade radio receivers' clutter; electrical parts were left exposed after assembly, multiple wet-cell batteries leaked corrosive battery acid, and a cable spaghetti of wires connected everything. The acid issue was widespread because all radios, except crystal sets, used batteries until the mid to late 1920s. Replacement acid was sold as "battery oil" to avoid women's reluctance to have the substance in homes.

A way of fitting radio into a home's existing decor was disguising receivers as furniture, a topic discussed in the press as early as 1923. As self-contained, preassembled batteryless radios using AC power became available, manufacturers recognized the importance of what a 1924 Radio Broadcast article's headline described as "Making Radio Attractive to Women". Radio News in 1926 held a contest to design the ideal radio receiver exterior; the winning woman's entry suggested that it be useful as furniture.

As women increasingly influenced radio purchases, and the devices moved from the man's den to the living room, a 1927 article in Radio Broadcast stated that a "receiver, to be fully appreciated by the female half of the domestic republic, must be encased in housings which are esthetically as well as technically satisfactory". Elaborate radio cabinets often composed most of the price difference between models that used similar electronic components. Components could be replaced while retaining the cabinet as permanent furniture; they had doors that completely hid the radio when not in use. Philco offered cabinets with painted flowers as an option for its first radios in 1928. Circa 1930 elaborate cabinets became less common as newer, smaller table radios became commodities, rendering the issue of gender moot.

=== Term "Wife Acceptance Factor" ===
Larry Greenhill first used the term "Wife Acceptance Factor" in September 1983, writing for Stereophile magazine, and credited fellow reviewer and music professor Lewis Lipnick with the coining of the term. The majority of Stereophile subscribers in the late 1980s were men.
