= Spectrometric Oil Analysis Program =

Aircraft oil testing method

Spectrometric Oil Analysis Program (SOAP) is a method used by aircraft operators, including several Air Forces of the World, to test the health of aircraft engines by performing frequent laboratory testing of the engine oil. The tests reveal the chemical composition of any metal particles suspended in the oil samples. By comparing the results to the known chemical composition of various engine parts, abnormal wear of engine parts can be identified, and servicing of the engine can be initiated, thus sometimes avoiding further costly repairs or even catastrophic engine failure.
