= Desheng, Heilongjiang =

Desheng 德胜镇
- Town
- Location in Heilongjiang
- Coordinates: 46°52′8″N 126°7′42″E
- Country: People's Republic of China
- Province: Heilongjiang
- Prefecture-level city: Suihua
- County: Qinggang County
- Time zone: UTC+8 (China Standard)

Desheng (Chinese: 德胜; pinyin: Déshèng) is a town under the administration of Qinggang County, Heilongjiang, China. As of 2020, it administers the following twelve villages.

== Administrative divisions ==
- Ronghua Village (荣花村)
- Longsheng Village (龙胜村)
- Yong'an Village (永安村)
- Jinglong Village (景龙村)
- Fugui Village (富贵村)
- Tongli Village (同立村)
- Yingxian Village (英贤村)
- Tongshun Village (通顺村)
- Hengsheng Village (恒生村)
- Wanghai Village (望海村)
- Jiefang Village (解放村)
- Yichang Village (一场村)
