= Mountain Township =

Mountain Township may refer to:

== Canada ==
- Mountain Township, Ontario, now part of North Dundas

== United States ==
=== Arkansas ===
- Mountain Township, Cleburne County, Arkansas, in Cleburne County, Arkansas
- Mountain Township, Faulkner County, Arkansas, in Faulkner County, Arkansas
- Mountain Township, Franklin County, Arkansas, in Franklin County, Arkansas
- Mountain Township, Howard County, Arkansas, in Howard County, Arkansas
- Mountain Township, Logan County, Arkansas, in Logan County, Arkansas
- Mountain Township, Pike County, Arkansas, in Pike County, Arkansas
- Mountain Township, Polk County, Arkansas, in Polk County, Arkansas
- Mountain Township, Scott County, Arkansas, in Scott County, Arkansas
- Mountain Township, Van Buren County, Arkansas, in Van Buren County, Arkansas
- Mountain Township, Yell County, Arkansas, in Yell County, Arkansas

=== Illinois ===
- Mountain Township, Saline County, Illinois

=== Missouri ===
- Mountain Township, Barry County, Missouri
- Mountain Township, McDonald County, Missouri

=== North Carolina ===
- Mountain Township, Jackson County, North Carolina, in Jackson County, North Carolina
