= Mountain River (album) =

Studio album by Dou Wei
- Released: 1998

Dou Wei chronology
Sunny Days (1995)	Mountain River (1998)	Eight Fragments (2004)

Mountain River (山河水) is the third studio album by Chinese artist Dou Wei. The album was released in 1998. It is an experimental album of techno and Chinese traditional music.

== Track listing ==
Standard listing
No.	Title	Unofficial translation	Length
1.	"Shānhéshuǐ 山河水"	"Mountain River"	3:41
2.	"Měilí de Qīdài 美麗的期待"	"Beautiful Expectancy"	4:15
3.	"Fēngjǐng 風景"	"Scenery"	3:27
4.	"Sān yuè chūntiān三月春天"	"Spring In March"	4:58
5.	"Rónghuà 熔化"	"Melting"	4:40
6.	"Nǎ'er de shì er 哪兒的事兒"	"Where are the thing"	3:40
7.	"Chāi 拆"	"Deconstruction"	3:51
8.	"Xiāoshī de yǐngxiàng 消失的影像"	"Disappearing Image"	3:30
9.	"Zhúyèqīng 竹葉青"	"Green Bamboo Leaves"	4:14
10.	"Chūyóu 出遊"	"Going Out"	3:52
11.	"Wǎnxiá 晚霞"	"Sunset"	3:52
