= Cui Jian =

Chinese singer-songwriter (born 1961)

- 崔健 최건
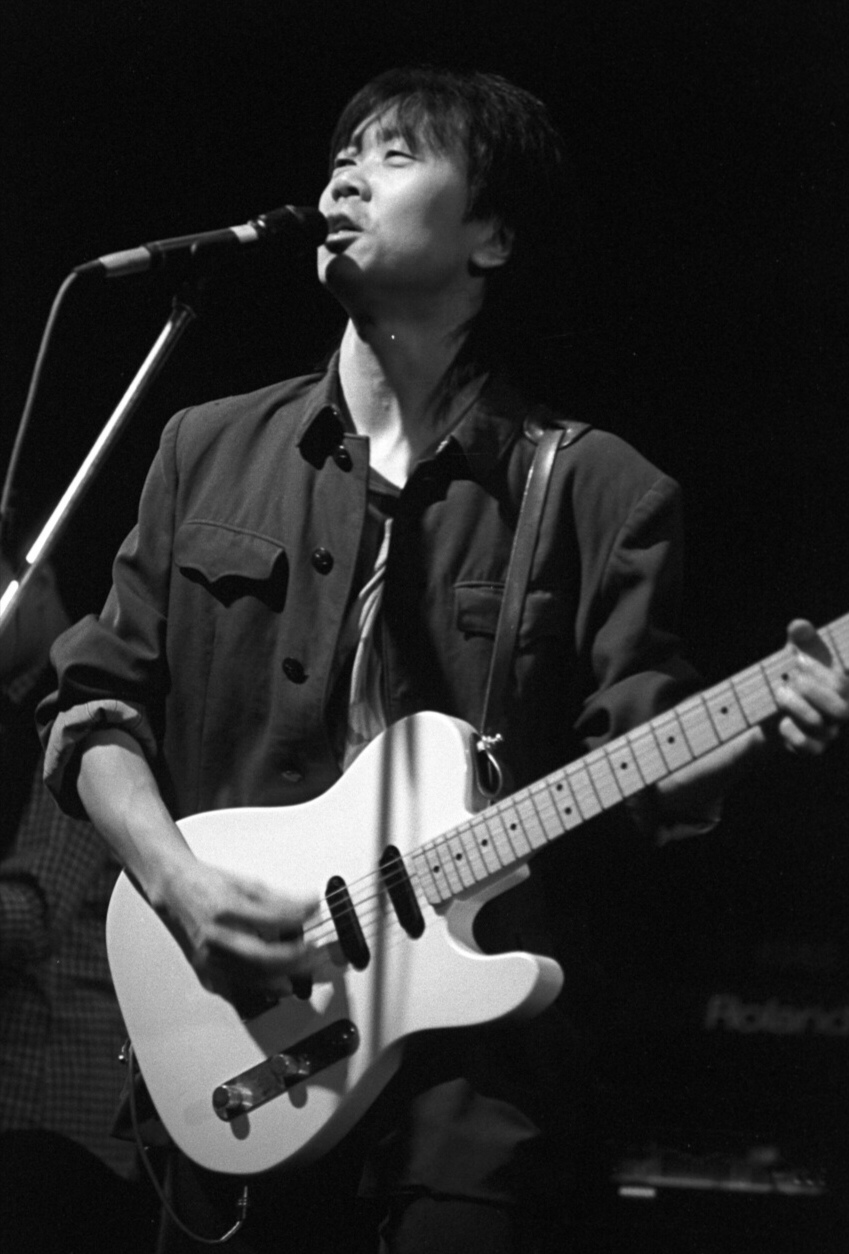
- Cui in 1993
- Born: 2 August 1961 (age 65); Beijing, China
- Occupations: Singer; songwriter; musician; record producer
- Years active: 1984–present
- Height: 172 cm (5 ft 8 in)
- Children: 1
- Awards: Full list
- Musical career
- Also known as: Old Cui (老崔; Lǎo Cuī)
- Origin: China
- Genres: Rock; folk; pop; jazz; hip-hop; electronic; avant-garde; experimental
- Instruments: Vocals; guitar; trumpet; synthesizer; programming; DAW
- Labels: East West; Jingwen; Coden; UFO; EMI; TME; Sony; Universal
- Formerly of: Qi He Ban

Chinese name
- Chinese: 崔健
Transcriptions
Standard Mandarin
- Hanyu Pinyin: Cuī Jiàn
- IPA: [tsʰwéɪ tɕjɛ̂n]

Chinese Korean name
- Chosŏn'gŭl: 최건
Transcriptions
- Revised Romanization: Choe Geon
- McCune–Reischauer: Ch'oe Kŏn
- Website: www.cuijian.com

Cui Jian (Chinese: 崔健; Korean: 최건; born 2 August 1961) is a Chinese singer-songwriter and musician. Known for his countercultural impact, he has launched a ground-breaking musical trend of Chinese rock and pop, dubbed the "Godfather of Chinese Rock". With poetic, socially conscious lyrics, his experimental approach features multiple traditional instruments, eclectic musical elements and cultural references from different eras. Cui is widely deemed the most influential rock musician in China (Note: Attributed to multiple references:) as well as one of the greatest and most prominent figures in Chinese music.

Born into an ethnic Korean family with parents who were both artists, Cui began his musical career as a classically trained trumpeter before switching to guitar. He rose to prominence with his single "Nothing to My Name", which mixed rock and roll and xintianyou and became an instant hit in 1986. A pioneer of the country's alternative music, he challenged the dominant culture, earning a cult following on China's university campuses while also facing backlash from social conservatives. This was followed by the unprecedented success of Rock 'n' Roll on the New Long March (1989), generally acclaimed as China's first rock album, which heralded him as the "spokesperson for his generation". However, for more than a decade, his performing in Beijing was on-off interdicted, partly because of his activist role in the 1989 Tiananmen Square protests.

He consolidated his fame with less commercial and more sophisticated Solution (1991) and Balls Under the Red Flag (1994), the latter of which is considered by critics to be his magnum opus. Later he shifted towards electronic and rap-oriented avant-rock on The Power of the Powerless (1998) and Show You Colour (2005), and returned to a folk and blues rock style with Frozen Light (2015) and A Flying Dog (2021). According to Billboard magazine, Cui is estimated to have sold 100 million albums, although the vast majority have been pirated copies. In 2009, he was voted the sixth most influential Chinese singer of the past 60 years in a China Internet Information Center history poll. At the 2010 Chinese Music Awards, he was ranked among the 30 greatest Chinese artists of the past 30 years.

Cui has also been involved in other projects including music directing and filmmaking. Since the 1993 underground movie Beijing Bastards, he has worked on several films as an investor, composer, screenwriter, guest star, and producer; he also directed the musical Blue Sky Bones. Despite his many denials, Cui's actions and work have led him to be often portrayed as a dissident. His international acclaim is always tied to his public persona with political overtones, which frequently downplays his musical achievements.

== Early life ==
Cui Jian is a third-generation ethnic Korean whose grandfather migrated to China during the Japanese occupation and established the family. Cui's parents moved to Beijing from the industrial northeast in the 1950s. His father, Cui Xiongji, who died in 2006, was a professional trumpet player, and his mother, Zhang Shunhua, who was born in Busan, South Korea, was a member of the China National Ethnic Song and Dance Ensemble. He lived with his parents and younger brother Cui Dong in an old two-bedroom apartment within an apartment building near Yonghe Temple. Cui Xiongji conducted strict nationalist education, but Cui Jian rebelled against such education from childhood. Cui Jian said that he was a little red guard. He spent his childhood at an air force boarding kindergarten due to his parents' demanding work schedules. Their limited proficiency in Chinese contributed to his stutter. Cui Xiongji described the young Cui Jian as possessing "an intense intellectual curiosity about incomprehensible subjects, often engaging in solitary observation and contemplation". Cui Dong said that when Cui Jian was young, his essays were particularly strong, his other academic performance was also quite good, and he was a good student.

Cui Jian became jobless after graduating from middle school and lived in a 14-square-meter room with his family. Cui Xiongji told Cui Jian that "either up to the mountains and down to the countryside or play musical instruments". Cui Jian followed his father to start playing the trumpet at the age of fourteen. He joined the Beijing Symphony Orchestra in 1981, at the age of twenty, became a professional trumpet player of the Beijing Aihe Orchestra. Yang Leqiang, a former member of Seven-Player Band, recalled that during symphony orchestra rehearsals at the time, while others wore crisp suits, Cui showed up in slim-fit pants. Cui first heard rock and roll in the early 1980s when professional musician friends smuggled cassette tapes in from Hong Kong and Bangkok. He spent this period listening to Simon & Garfunkel, Bob Dylan, the Rolling Stones, the Beatles and the Talking Heads. He learned to play guitar and began writing music, which he played in cafés and dormitories. He bought his first guitar for 20 yuan and learned to play it from a Mongolian worker, surpassing him within a couple of weeks. During that era, playing guitar was deemed "hooligan" and "bourgeois" behavior. In 1983, when Cui Jian went to Handan for a performance with his troupe, he played guitar one evening. He recalled "the audience was instantly stunned, and one girl immediately burst into tears". That same year, he wrote his first song "I Love My Guitar". Zhou Yaping, former timpanist of the orchestra, recalled that Cui could accurately imitate the singing styles of English-language vocalists, or artists like Liu Wen-cheng, which was quite rare at the time.

== Career ==
=== Early career ===
In 1984, Cui released his first album Contemporary European and American Popular Jazz Disco (Chinese: 当代欧美流行爵士Disco). Inspired by Simon & Garfunkel and John Denver, that same year Cui formed his first band, Seven-Player Band (also known as "Qi He Ban", 七合板, literally "Seven-Player Board," a double entendre reference to the seven-member band) with six other classically trained musicians, for which Cui played guitar and was also the lead singer. The seminal band was heavily influenced by The Beatles, The Rolling Stones, and Talking Heads. The band played Western pop music in small restaurants and bars in Beijing and was the first of its kind in China. They performed their own works—mostly soft rock and love songs—in local hotels and bars. With his band, Cui released his first cassette Returning Wanderer that same year. The album featured commercial, pop-oriented love songs but also showcased songs with progressive and folk-rock influences, which were fresh and innovative in China at the time.

In 1985, the band released another album titled "With Seven-Player Band", which featured a combination of Western pop-rock as well as new original songs. That June, under pressure from the authorities, the Seven-Player Band was forced to disband. Soon afterwards, Cui wrote his first rock song "It's Not That I Don't Understand", regarded as the earliest ancestor of Chinese rap rock. The song shares elements with Western hip hop through its use of drum set and foreign percussion instruments like bongos, congas, and timbales, while incorporating a dizi solo, marking one of the earliest moments when hip hop merged with Chinese traditional sounds. Over the next two years, Cui wrote thirteen songs. In late 1985, the cafeteria of the Beijing Film Academy hosted a music performance where Cui performed his original song "Rock 'n' Roll on the New Long March". Midway through the set, several CBS journalists arrived to film "China's rock 'n' roll". Yang Leqiang, member of Seven-Player Band, rushed the stage, hoisted Cui onto his shoulders, and students, including future rock musician He Yong, chanted, "His name is Cui Jian!" He later participated in the "Peacock Cup" vocal competition, with judges including Wang Kun and Li Shuangjiang, but was eliminated in the preliminary round due to his singing style being deemed unacceptable at the time.

=== 1986–1988: The popularity of "Nothing to My Name" and collaboration with ADO ===
==== Filling the World with Love and "Nothing to My Name" ====
"Nothing to My Name"
Sample of "Nothing to My Name". Jonathan Matusitz, Associate Professor at the University of Central Florida, maintains that the song symbolizes China's rebellious youth and delineates "the birth of postmodernism in Chinese pop music".

In early 1986, coinciding with the International Year of Peace, Chinese musician Guo Feng organized the recording of the charity song "Filling the World with Love" and planned to hold a concert of the same name convening 100 popular singers in mainland China to change the stereotypes of popular music. Prompted by this recording, cultural authorities made their first exception for popular music by permitting the organization of the concert. At the recommendation of popular singer Wang Di, Cui Jian participated in the concert and applied for a solo segment. With the permission of Wang Kun, Cui was able to sing his song "Nothing to My Name" at the concert. The concert took place at Beijing Workers' Gymnasium on 9 May. That evening, the venue was packed to capacity, with "everyone wondering what was going to happen".

Two minutes before taking the stage, Cui felt his suit was "utterly stifling," so he switched to the dagua belonging to the father of Wang Di. Because of Cui's disheveled hair, cold look, and his apparel, which were different from the previous "gorgeously dressed" singers with "graceful singing", the audience became chaotic. However, the moment his "hoarse voice" rang out, the audience fell silent immediately. Then came applause and whistles, followed by continuous cheers. Keyboard player Liang Heping recalled that his hair "stood straight on end". After the concert, the young people sang his verses and played air guitar on the streets. Official personnel present displayed attitudes diametrically opposed to those of the young audience. Some "old comrades" from Yan'an left in the concert because they were afraid to take responsibility. Music writer Andrew Jones describes this event with the words:

At first the crowd – accustomed to sitting woodenly through the well-manicured recitals of politically correct pop songs – was reduced to stunned silence. Cui Jian was hopping around the stage in tattered People's Liberation Army (PLA) khakis [sic], fixing the audience with intense glare, singing things that everyone had always wanted to say but thought they couldn't. Within minutes, people were cheering wildly and defying the security guards to dance on their seats.

"Nothing to My Name" is considered by some to be the first indie song in China. The sampling inspiration for the song draws from Northwestern China's "Xintianyou" folk music. Cui Jian incorporated traditional instruments like the suona, guzheng, dizi, and xiao, while blending elements and rhythms from punk, jazz, Afro-pop, and rap. Professor of East Asian Studies Nimrod Baranovitch wrote that the song features a hybrid of folklore with strong, fast and modern disco and rock beats. Stefan Simons wrote for Der Spiegel that Cui's loud, aggressive tones blasted against "oily party" arias and "schmaltzy" pop music from Hong Kong and Taiwan, making the song the anthem of the alternative music and youth scene. The song is about a failed love affair, but widely read as a metaphor for the growing estrangement of Chinese youth from the political climate of China. Compared with the first-person plural pronoun "we" in revolutionary songs, the word "I" appears in 28 times out of the song's 42 lines and becomes a liberating call for self-expression. BBC correspondent Henry Knight described the song as "individualism, experimentation and non-conformity". Hong Kong news website HK01 stated that this love song accurately and profoundly depicts the confusion experienced by China's younger generation amid the collapse of social values at the time, as well as their reflections on identity amidst dual material and spiritual hardships.

His performance has been seen as the moment heralding the birth of Chinese rock 'n' roll, which has been compared to The Beatles on The Ed Sullivan Show. Parangalan, known as the Father of Taiwanese Folk Songs, thought "the younger generation in mainland China can now write their own songs" after hearing "Nothing to My Name". The song peaked at number one on the Chinese Pop Chart, and remains one of the most influential songs in the history of China.

==== Follow-up development ====
Two months after the concert, "Nothing to My Name" CDs and cassettes hit the market. Cui soon became China's rock icon and enfant terrible. He was considered the only singer in mainland China at the time who could write lyrics, compose music, and perform his own songs, all by himself. Following the fashion style of Cui – long hair, jeans and boots – Chinese young fans cheered wildly and danced in the aisles when he performed this song. Peking University established the "Peking University Cui Jian Backup Group", the first fan club in mainland China. American sinologist Orville Schell said that "listening to Cui Jian's music after all the disco bands in the country is equivalent to listening to Bach after Barry Manilow". Under the strong endorsement of writer-musician Liu Sola and scholar Li Tuo, Cui and his song "Nothing to My Name" quickly captured the attention of China's cultural circles, with the "Cui Jian phenomenon" becoming a fiercely debated topic in academia. From this time on, Chinese rock music transitioned from its initially controversial and less recognized "underground era" to a "mainstream era" with substantial youth support. On 16 July 1988, People's Daily published a lengthy 1500-word commentary on Cui, which explains Cui's popularity and analyses his immense appeal to students, teachers, workers, and private entrepreneurs. This was the first time a rock singer was featured in China's mainstream media. Outside of China, Cui enjoyed international acclaim after a television appearance at the 1988 Olympics in Seoul.

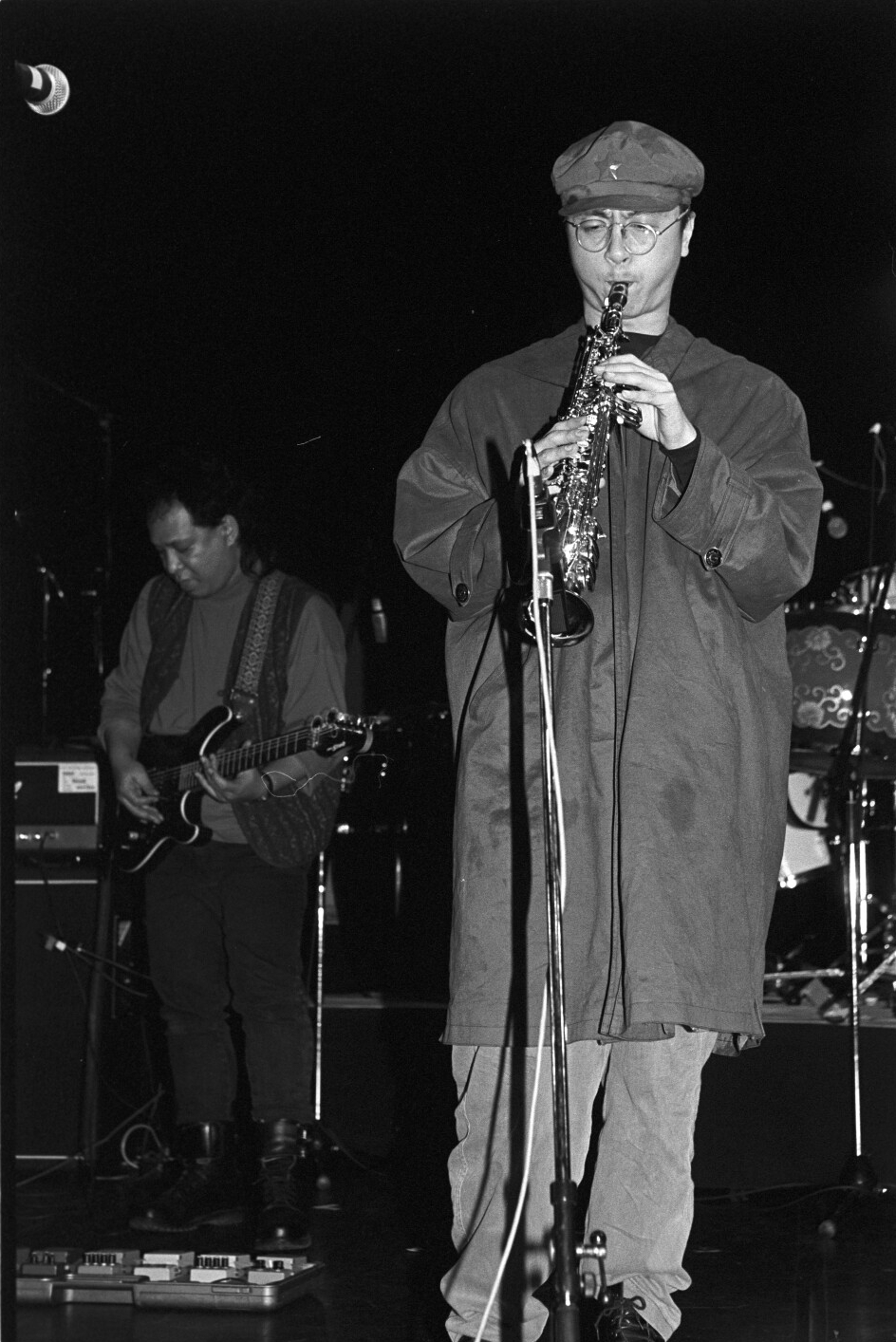
Former ADO members Eddie (left) and Liu Yuan (right) respectively served long-term as the lead guitarist and wind instrumentalist in Cui's backing band; the latter died in 2024.

Cui participated in a series of benefit concerts for the restoration of Beijing's Marco Polo Bridge after the 100-Singer Concert of Year of International Peace. In 1987, the Party launched an ideological campaign against "bourgeois liberalization". Cui was banned from performing for a year after a Beijing performance on 14 January enraged one Party official, forcing him to perform underground during this period. It is generally agreed that this was because he covered "Nanniwan" in a rock style on that day. American journalist James Mann reported that Cui was resisted by old officials. Officials labeled Cui's rendition "red song sung in yellow fashion" (Chinese: 红歌黄唱), meaning that Cui's rock version of the song was a contamination of a sacred symbol. Some musicians with government background, such as Chen Zhiang, criticized Cui, even insinuating that he was an "instigator of riots". Linda Jaivin suggested in 1988 that "one reason for Cui's troubles was an internal document linking the student movement of late 1986 with the growing popularity of rock 'n roll". Eventually, Cui was forced to withdraw from the Beijing Symphony Orchestra. Entertainment journalist Steven Schwankert said that when Cui left the philharmonic, there was no real opportunity to make a living without the government lifeline of an apartment and a paycheck. Cui began playing regularly with a band, ADO. With ADO, Cui managed to support himself by playing at private parties for foreigners, in restaurants, bars, small hotels and the after-hours club at Beijing Maxim's restaurant. Cui made a guest appearance in the 1987 TV series Football Revelation, which depicts the 19 May Incident. In January 1988, Cui successfully staged his debut solo concert with ADO at Beijing's Zhongshan Music Hall. He signed with EMI in this year.

=== 1989–1990: Rock 'N' Roll on the New Long March, Tiananmen Square Incident and banned from performing ===
In this recording, Cui Jian not only expanded the lyrical and policical boundaries of Chinese pop/rock, he also experimented stylistically with a variety of musical influences. The title cut contains some rhythmic references to reggae; there are several places where an interest in North American country music is both rhythmically and melodically apparent; and rhythm and blues-style saxophone solos permeate the work. All in all, this recording stands as the most important work yet released within the realm of Chinese popular music.

— Reebee Garofalo, 1999

In February 1989, Cui and the ADO band released China's first original rock album Rock 'N' Roll on the New Long March, which was also China's first album recorded using electric instruments like electric bass, guitars, and drums. Taiwanese music critic Ma Shih-fang described the album as "a knife that sliced Chinese music history into 'before Cui Jian' and 'after Cui Jian'". Cui himself characterized the album's style as "rock with a touch of world music" and pop-rock. The album broke sales records and became the biggest selling album in China's history at the time. It was also certified double platinum in Taiwan and platinum in Hong Kong, and listed in The 200 Best Taiwanese Popular Music Albums, a compilation jointly published by China Times Publishing and the China Musicians Exchange Association. This album is considered to have sparked the golden age of Chinese rock.

In early 1989, Cui performed at the "Printemps de Bourges" International Rock Festival in Paris, France, and was received by former French Prime Minister Jacques Chirac. He also represented mainland China respectively in London at the Salem Music Awards Show in March. In the same month, Cui held the Rock 'N' Roll on the New Long March Concert at the Beijing Exhibition Hall, attracting an audience of two thousand. During intermission, upon overhearing someone remark, "Isn't this just a bunch of hoodlums?" Cui took the microphone and addressed the crowd: "Someone just called us a bunch of hoodlums. If that person doesn't feel ashamed, then we take this as a great honor!" The venue erupted with cheers and thunderous applause. EMI wanted to release a live video album of this concert, but Cui was dissatisfied with the filming and editing approach, feeling that "this is packaging me as a pop star". The collaboration, worth a million Hong Kong dollars, ultimately fell apart.

Cui reached the apex of his popularity during the Tiananmen Square protests of 1989, when "Nothing to My Name" became an anthem to pro-democracy demonstrators. His records were broadcast over loud speakers and sung repeatedly by protestors throughout the vigil. Iowa Central Community College professor David Drissel compared it to the American peace movement's relationship with rock and folk music in the 1960s. He was frequently seen with the students. Cui was affirmed by Wu'er Kaixi, one of the prominent leaders of the movement, as highly influential among young Chinese of the time. He claimed that Cui had an even greater influence on the protests than did such prominent dissidents as Fang Lizhi and Wei Jingsheng.

On 19 May, Cui walked onto the makeshift stage at Tiananmen Square to give a performance for students on hunger strike. This was his third visit to the square, while the first time he played. The crowds at Tiananmen were thrilled to receive him, and Cui later described it "felt like a big party". Although he was "really clear about standing on the students' side", he heard someone asking him to "get out of the square" because the students were very weak. He performed impromptu songs including "Start Over" and "Piece of Red Cloth" and received a warm welcome. Despite the students' lack of energy, Cui "made them pretty crazy". Voices in the crowd reassure the band that they are OK with the boisterous music. According to several sources, Cui left the square in disgust after several competing student factions attempted to manipulate him and claim ownership over him. The following government crackdown forced many rock musicians, Cui included, into hiding in the other provinces. Sanctions proved relatively temporary, and Cui was able to return to Beijing shortly afterward. There has been no further sanctions targeting him. Chinese rock music faced criticism by the authorities due to the movement. At an official music symposium convened in 1990, it was asserted that Rock 'N' Roll on the New Long March bore "practically no difference" from "Western Beatles-style 'protest songs or political songs'". Sun Shen, vice chairman of the Chinese Musicians' Association, publicly criticized the album for "misrepresenting and distorting" the Long March. The Minister of Culture, Wang Meng, who had praised Cui's qualities and encouraged independent creation, resigned after the massacre.

In early 1990, Cui started his first rock tour entitled the "New Long March", to raise money for the 1990 Asian Games. Because of his admiration for Cui Jian, Zhang Baifa, Vice Mayor of Beijing, approved the tour. This was the largest-scale rock tour in mainland China at the time. Due to complaints from relevant departments and the public, Zhang deployed over a thousand police officers and plainclothes personnel to ensure the concert proceeded smoothly. The tour was terminated halfway through. While the reason was unclear, some did mention that Cui said the following words: "I hope last year's shot was really the last" after singing the song "Last Shot". Chinese photographer Xiao Quan stated that Cui's performance was reported as excessively incendiary, "clearly an attempt to incite revolution". David R. Schweisberg from UPI observed that Cui's performances routinely incite young Chinese to flash the V-for-victory sign, the emblem of Tiananmen Square Incident. Other possible causes include the crowds were getting too large and unruly. Then, for much of the 1990s, he was unofficially banned from performing in Beijing and carefully monitored when he gave concerts elsewhere. Journalists were unable to find any records or documentation on the concrete reasons for Cui's ban. Chinese music-lovers at that time considered seeing one of Cui's underground shows at venues around Beijing as a "badge of honor". The Korea Economic Daily reported that although under strict control, tens of thousands of the audience gathers every time at Cui's performance venue.

After recording Rock 'N' Roll on the New Long March, Cui ceased working with Ado. He formed his own band featuring Japanese guitarist Masaaki Amari, bassist Liu Junli, drummer Ma He, and keyboardist Wang Yong. On 8 August 1990, Cui lost his lawsuit against the Beijing Dongcheng District Tax Administration over "improper taxation", which was allegedly China's first copyright lawsuit.

=== 1991–1993: Solution and charity performances ===
"Like A Knife"
Sample of "Like A Knife" from Solution (1991). Toshihiro Yuge, a professor at Ehime University, believed the song lampoons the gerontocracy in China.

In February 1991, Cui released his album Solution in mainland China, sparking intense public resonance. Nicholas D. Kristof of The New York Times that year called the album was perhaps Cui's most daring.。The recording achieves a rougher, faster sound using a more distorted guitar timbre and quicker tempos, while the vocal deliver is rougher, less melodic, and more rhythmic. Cui called the album featuring punk rock. Kevin Platt of The Christian Science Monitor thought Cui began producing pop-punk songs after the Tiananmen Square massacre. Author Wu Quntao wrote that Solution reflects Cui's state of extreme mental anguish during this period and his active pursuit of self-redemption, while also bringing punk into public consciousness.

Due to the underdeveloped professionalism in China's rock scene at the time, tensions over Cui's employment-based management led to his band's breakup shortly after releasing Solution. Cui subsequently formed a new lineup consisting mostly of Ado members alongside keyboardist Zang Tianshuo. During the 1990s of his career, Cui stirred up controversy among the public and media due to his conflicts with other musicians, such as Lo Ta-yu, Hou Te-chien, and Zhang Chu; he remarked that the "conflict" between him and Hou had been greatly exaggerated by the media, and publicly reconciled with Zhang in 1996. In 1992, Australian sinologist Geremie Barmé wrote that over the previous two years, as Cui was approaching middle-age, younger rockers had come to think it was time for him to "roll over" and make room, even calling to "exterminate Cui Jian". Zhang Ju of Tang Dynasty stated, "If we are going to overthrow something, it will be Cui Jian's monopoly on the word "Superstar'". As reported by UPI, Cui has also been attacked by more traditional musicians and people, and state-run media. Chinese authorities' promotion of what they deemed "harmless" Gangtai pop to replace rock music led to a situation in the early 1990s where "it was easier for young Chinese to listen to the Hong Kong rock band Beyond through pirated CDs and tapes than to find Cui Jian's albums".

In July 1991, Cui traveled to Hong Kong to participate in the benefit concert, which aimed to raise money for the 1991 Huadong floods relief efforts. The authorities rejected Cui's application to organize a charity performance in September. Since July 1992, authorities have let Cui stage several small shows in Beijing, and also permitted him to undertake a Japanese tour. Hankook Ilbo reported that during his Tokyo performances in March 1992, over 50,000 fans gathered and enthused wildly. The same year, he announced legal action against record companies that have flooded the market with pirated tapes of his songs, and accused journalist Zhao Jianwei and the Beijing Normal University Press of character defamation. In late 1992, Cui was granted permission to hold a three-day large-scale concert at the Beijing Exhibition Center. The government permitted it due to his charity gesture, and all proceeds went to the China Cancer Foundation. He has not had the chance to perform at large-scale public occasions in Beijing since 1993.

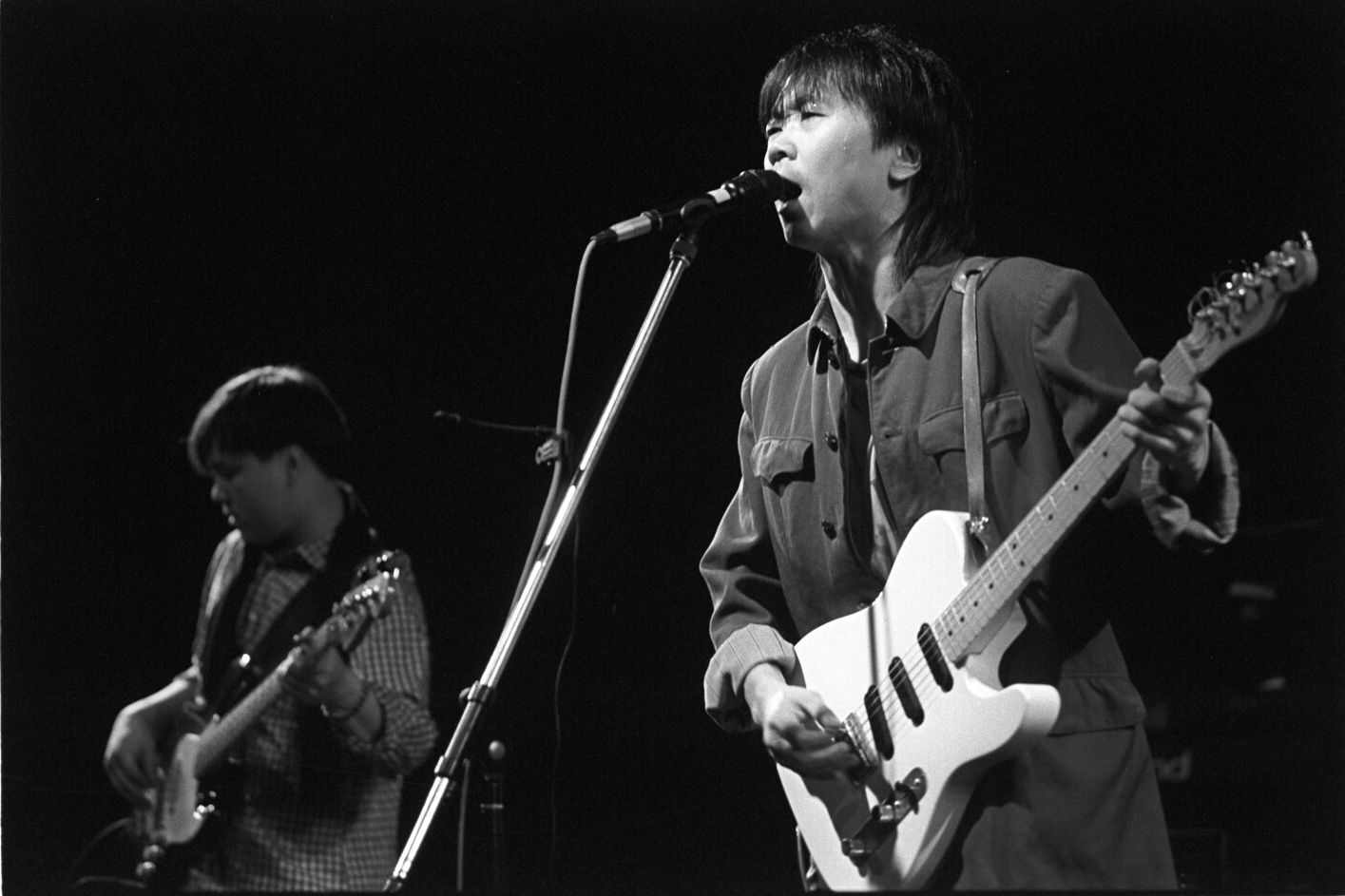
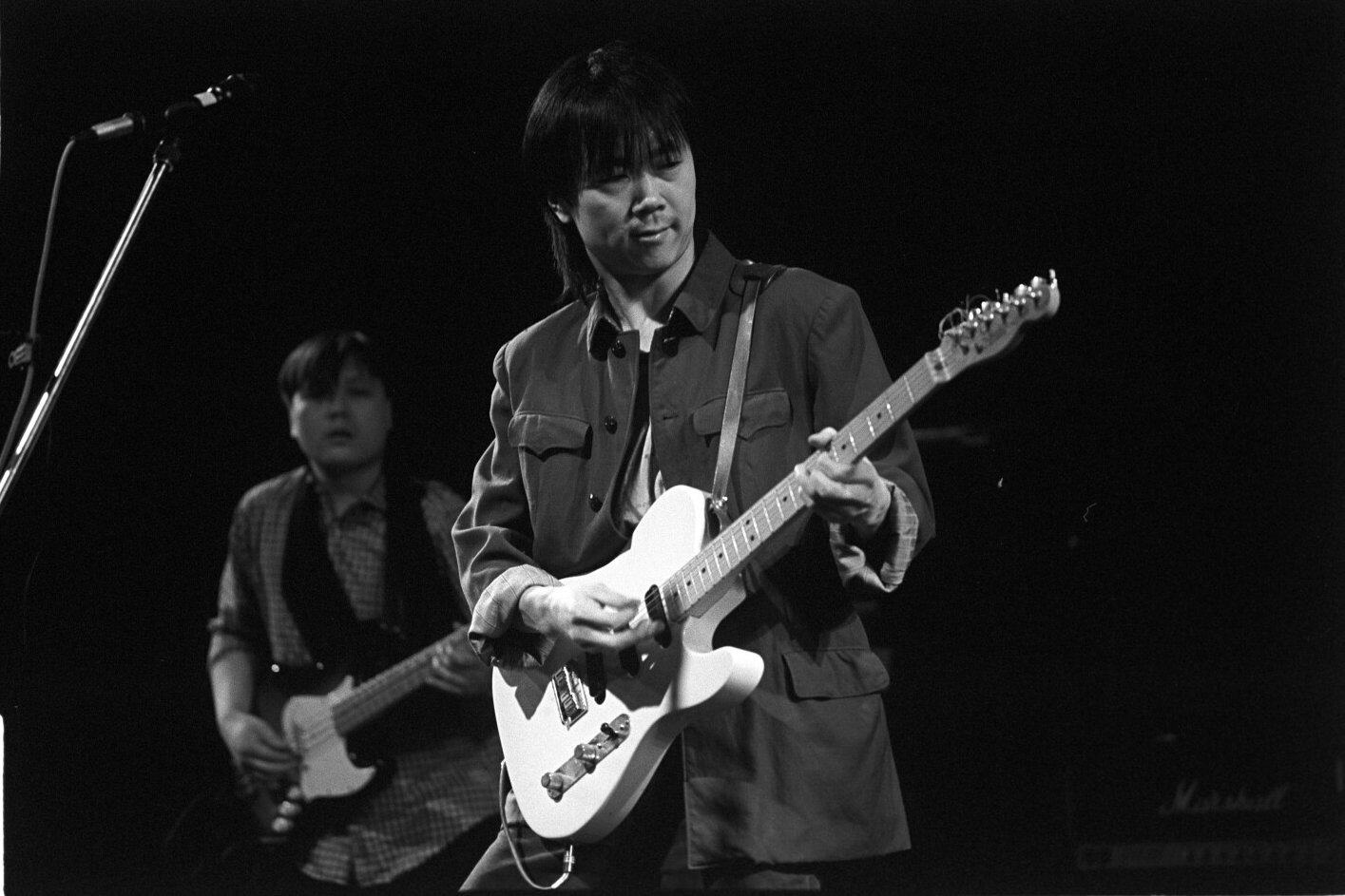
Cui Jian performing in Germany on 2 February 1993

Cui scored and was cast in the 1993 film Beijing Bastards, commonly billed as China's first underground movie. That same year, he performed in Germany and Switzerland with Chinese rock bands such as Tang Dynasty and Cobra. Chinese media dubbed this year the "Year of Rock". By the year Cui has sold hundreds of thousands of records in other Asian countries.

=== 1994–1996: Balls Under the Red Flag and international tour ===
Balls Under the Red Flag was released in August 1994 but it was soon banned by the authorities, due to its explicit reference to various social issues. Both Solution and Balls Under the Red Flag were re-released in 2005. Cui characterized the album as jazz punk. Critics have noted that starting with this album, he has incorporated elements of hard rock and hardcore rap. Hong Kong Inmedia noted that the album continues the approach from Solution that emphasizing rhythm and arrangements, and experiments with Chinese-style rapping, while infusing heavy doses of traditional folk instrumentation. Music journalist Cynthia Wong wrote that Cui's three albums have been progressively more sophisticated and experimental in terms of musical form, arrangement, and the realization of musical ideas.

The album sank as both a commercial and a critical failure upon its release, selling 3,000 to one million copies before removing from the shelves of music stores. Over time, the album gained acclaim. In 2000, Shopping Guide listed the album and Solution among "China's Top 10 Classic Rock Albums". Matthew Corbin Clark of PBS said in 2003 that Balls Under the Red Flag is many considered Cui's best record up to that time and a masterwork of the genre he created. Ma Shih-fang described the album as "flawless on every level, from lyrics, composition, arrangement, performance, vocals, recording, to echo with that particular era". Hashizume Daizaburo, one of the most renowned Japanese scholars in contemporary Chinese cultural studies, wrote that "the attitude of young Chinese audiences towards this informative album will be an excellent indicator of China's future". Peter Micic and David Stokes wrote in A selected annotated discography of Pop and Rock albums in the people's republic of China (1989–1995) that:

This aggressive and uncompromising album further alienated Cui Jian from mainstream audiences and the popular media, whilst being hailed by a loyal minority (and some Western conunentators) as his greatest work to date. Frantic saxophone and suona (double-reed shawm) lines twist around jagged guitar rhythms while Cui Jian spits out acerbic, often cryptic lyrics, ranging from the deeply personal to the blatantly political. Elements of punk, funk, rap, jazz and both traditional/folk and revolutionary Chinese music are brought together with astonishing coherence. … This album is probably the most challenging, mature and accomplished rock album yet to emerge from China.

To promote the release of his album, Cui toured four cities in Japan, generating significant responses from local media and audiences. The same year, he performed at Bumbershoot in Seattle, U.S. He also founded Beijing East West Music & Art Production Co., Ltd., and served as its chairman. In August 1995, Cui launched his first U.S. tour, performing six solo concerts in Boston, San Francisco, and New York. This marked the first time a mainland Chinese singer had staged a personal concert tour in the United States. In 1996, Cui released a greatest hits compilation album, Best of Cui Jian:1986–1996.

=== 1997–2001: "Get Over That Day" and The Power of the Powerless ===
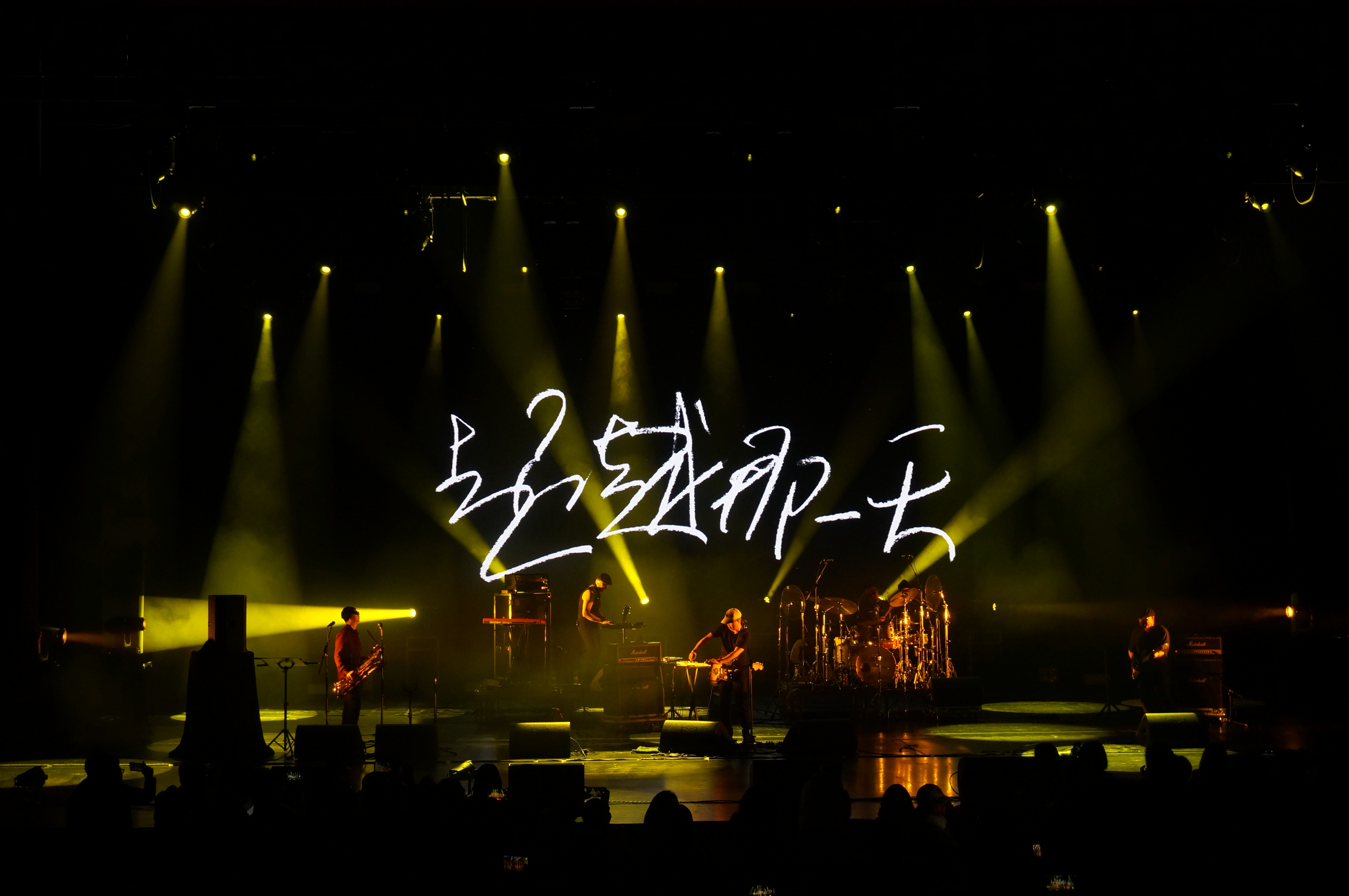
Cui performing "Get Over That Day" in 2022

In 1997, Cui released hit single "Get Over That Day". The song is about someone hearing he is getting a new sister who is smart, sexy and wealthy, and wondering if he will fall in love with her, indicating the handover of Hong Kong. The song is also believed to foresaw the Hong Kong–Mainland China conflict. In the same year, Cui served as the producer for Zi Yue Band's debut album The First Volume. According to Reuters, the Chinese government passed a law in September 1997 that forbids private establishments to make money from music performances that do not have official approval to strike a blow at "subversives" such as Cui Jian.

In April 1998, Cui released the album The Power of the Powerless, which recorded in his home studio. The album draws influence from techno, featuring digital rock with incorporated elements of electronic rock. Cui utilized the expressive semantics and aesthetics of rap music to depict the changing society in China during the late 20th century. In June, Mandopop!, the Internet Chinese entertainment news sheet, reported that this "modern classic" combining Cui's trademark buzz-saw guitars and intense lyrics with leading-edge jungle loops had fueled a Beijing-wide increase inrecord sales, with 200,000 units being moved in the first few days of its debut, "earning him rare praise from music industry suits".

Starting 31 July 1999, Cui Jian embarked on his second U. S.-wide tour, with "igniting a wave of Chinese rock fervor at every stop". On 8 September 2000, Cui and his band performed at the Ministry of Culture-sponsored "Oppose Piracy, Support Copyright" concert held at Workers' Stadium in Beijing. Cui was featured in a live music special on Hunan TV that year, which was the first time in 10 years he had received nationwide television coverage. He was also invited to attend the 2000 Cannes Film Festival. On 12 December, the Netherlands honoured him with the Prince Claus Award, making him the first Chinese musician to win the award. Later, he announced a European tour in the following January.

Cui was cast in the 2001 film Roots and Branches. and scored Jiang Wen's film Devils on the Doorstep. In February 2001, he collaborated with Cao Chengyuan, artistic director of the Hong Kong City Contemporary Dance Company and Beijing Modern Dance Company, on the experimental stage play Show You Colour, which premiered in Hong Kong. The play depicts China's different generations of revolution, pragmatism and the Digital Age, billed as "China's first rock 'n' roll dance concert". He was also invited to attend the Grammy Awards ceremony of the year. In October, the book Free Style, co-authored by Cui and philosopher Zhou Guoping, was released. The revised and expanded edition of this book, released in October 2012, had all its royalties donated to the Heping Life Foundation to fund the treatment and recovery of the musician Liang Heping.

=== 2002–2005: Live Vocals Movement ===
The "Live Vocals Movement" has transcended the scope of protecting citizens' economic rights; it implicitly carries the awakening of citizens' awareness of personal rights. We call for ultimately establishing in the form of legislation to grant more fairness and opportunities to conscientious and capable artists.

— "Live Vocals Movement Proclamation"

Cui has long criticized Chinese musicians for the common practice of lip-synching at live shows. As early as March 1999, Cui Jian teamed up with Tian Zhen, Han Lei, and others in Beijing to launch a signature campaign opposing lip-syncing. He called it the music industry's third greatest enemy in China alongside the system and piracy, describing it as "falling", "a malignant tumour", "a nest of crime", "the Emperor's New Clothes", and "an aggression against music and art". He also criticized the performances at the 2001 Summer Universiade's opening and closing ceremonies as a disgrace for Chinese musicians, because "their performances were entirely lip-synced, and even the lip-syncing production was extremely poor". On 1 August 2002, he revealed to the Beijing Youth Daily that he would launch the "Live Vocals Movement" to combat the widespread practice of lip-syncing. On 7 August at 4:00 PM, Cui held the "Live Vocals Signature Campaign" at CD Bar. After reading aloud the "Live Vocals Movement Proclamation" co-drafted by him and others, over 200 people signed their names on a red cloth pledging to perform live. Among them, Lo Ta-yu raised his hand in salute to Cui to show support. Afterwards, he began promoting the movement through a nationwide tour.

I felt obliged to call people's attention to the poor working environment of Chinese musicians. In China, genuine singing is hardly heard in concerts, gala spectaculars and TV shows.

The "Live Vocals Movement" has sparked controversy within the music industry, as exemplified by Chinese singer Na Ying's remark that the movement "is damaging to the entire pop music industry". On 13 January 2003, the Ministry of Culture declared its opposition to lip-syncing. Cui stated the "Live Vocals Movement" had "achieved a phased victory". On 1 August 2005, Cui Jian announced that the "Live Vocals Movement" had "victoriously concluded", as the newly enacted national "Regulations on Administration of Commercial Performances" explicitly prohibited lip-syncing. At the 2010 Top Chinese Music Awards 10th Anniversary Ceremony, the Live Vocals Movement was listed among the "Top Ten Music Events of the Decade", and Cui was included in the "Most Influential Artists".

In August 2002, Cui participated in organizing the Lijiang Snow Mountain Music Festival, known as the "Chinese Woodstock", attracting at least 10,000 fans. Zhang Hongping, vice commissioner of the Lijiang regional government, expressed thanks to Cui. In early 2003, Cui was authorized to open for the Rolling Stones' concert in Beijing. Due to the SARS outbreak, however, the concert was cancelled. On 26 February 2004, Cui sued several audio-visual companies from Beijing, Tianjin, and Henan for piracy and copyright violations. In February and March, Cui was invited to be the guest singer in Udo Lindenberg's touring musical Atlantic Affairs in Shanghai and Beijing. In March, when Cui opened for Deep Purple on their mainland tour, it was his first official performance in Beijing in more than a decade. He received the World Peace Music Award in San Francisco, from the United Nations on 26 September. On 24 August 2005, Cui was allowed to headline a concert entitled "Dream in the Sunshine" at Beijing's Capital Indoor Stadium, which was his first concert in Beijing for 12 years.

=== 2005–2014: Show You Colour and other fields of activities ===
"Village Attacks City"
A sample of "Village Attacks City" (from Show You Colour). Jon Pareles described it as merged funk with the hurtling double-time of drum-and-bass and the circling synthesizer notes of trance music.

On 23 March 2005, Cui released the album Show You Colour. He stated that this album is "more diverse, more independent, more cohesive... containing pop, rock, electronic, and hip-hop music", attempting the "maximalism" of music. China Daily described it as distinguished from "all of Cui's previous albums, and probably from any other rock album in China". Reviewers described the album as a "concept album", and pointed out that the album continues the musical style of The Power of the Powerless, incorporating genres including folk, hip-hop, funk, big beat, drum and bass, and digital hardcore. The album was well-received by media and critics. The Beijing Star Daily gave this album a score of 95/100, stating that the album signifies Cui's "official transition from a great rock singer to a great musician". Cui won Best Rock Singer at the 6th Top Chinese Music Awards for the album.

You You, Cui Jian's manager, said that the problems of his performance permits sometimes being refused by local authorities had "gradually gone with time". Since 2005, all bans on Cui were lifted with the exception of the song "Last Shot". Danielle Fosler-Lussier, Professor of Music at the Ohio State University, wrote that the government blunted Cui's revolutionary reputation by allowing him access to media and inviting him to official state events. In July 2005 Cui appeared at the "Great Concert on the 60th Anniversary of the Victory of World Anti-fascist War", a state-sponsored event in Beijing. He did finally play with the Rolling Stones at the Shanghai Grand Stage on 8 April 2006, singing and playing "Wild Horses". He performed his first English song "Outside Girl" and played with Public Enemy at the 2007 Beijing Pop Festival. Cui performed at the Hohaiyan Rock Festival in Taiwan on 8 July 2007, after numerous previous attempts to perform there were derailed by the Chinese government. The head Zhang 43 called Cui "the most important rock star in Asia".

After the 2008 Sichuan earthquake, Cui donated 51,200 RMB and organized a charity concert titled "Get Over That Day" with China's rock music community on 22 May, raising over 400,000 yuan in disaster relief funds. At the December 2009 Beijing Exhibition Center concert, "Rock 'N' Roll on the New Long March V21", Cui tied a red ribbon to call for attention to AIDS awareness. An ambassador for the annual Earth Hour campaign, Cui performed at an outdoor concert, Green Now, to celebrate the World Environment Day and encourage a low-carbon lifestyle at the Shanghai World Expo on 5 June 2010. From 31 December 2010 to 1 January 2011, Cui Jian collaborated with the Beijing Symphony Orchestra to stage the "Rock Symphony Live Concert" at Beijing Workers' Gymnasium, marking Asia's first integration of rock music with a symphonic orchestra performance. At the concert, he unexpectedly performed the banned anti-war song "Last Shot". October: The Rite of Spring, the first dance drama under Cui's full directorship, premiered in Tianjin in 2014.

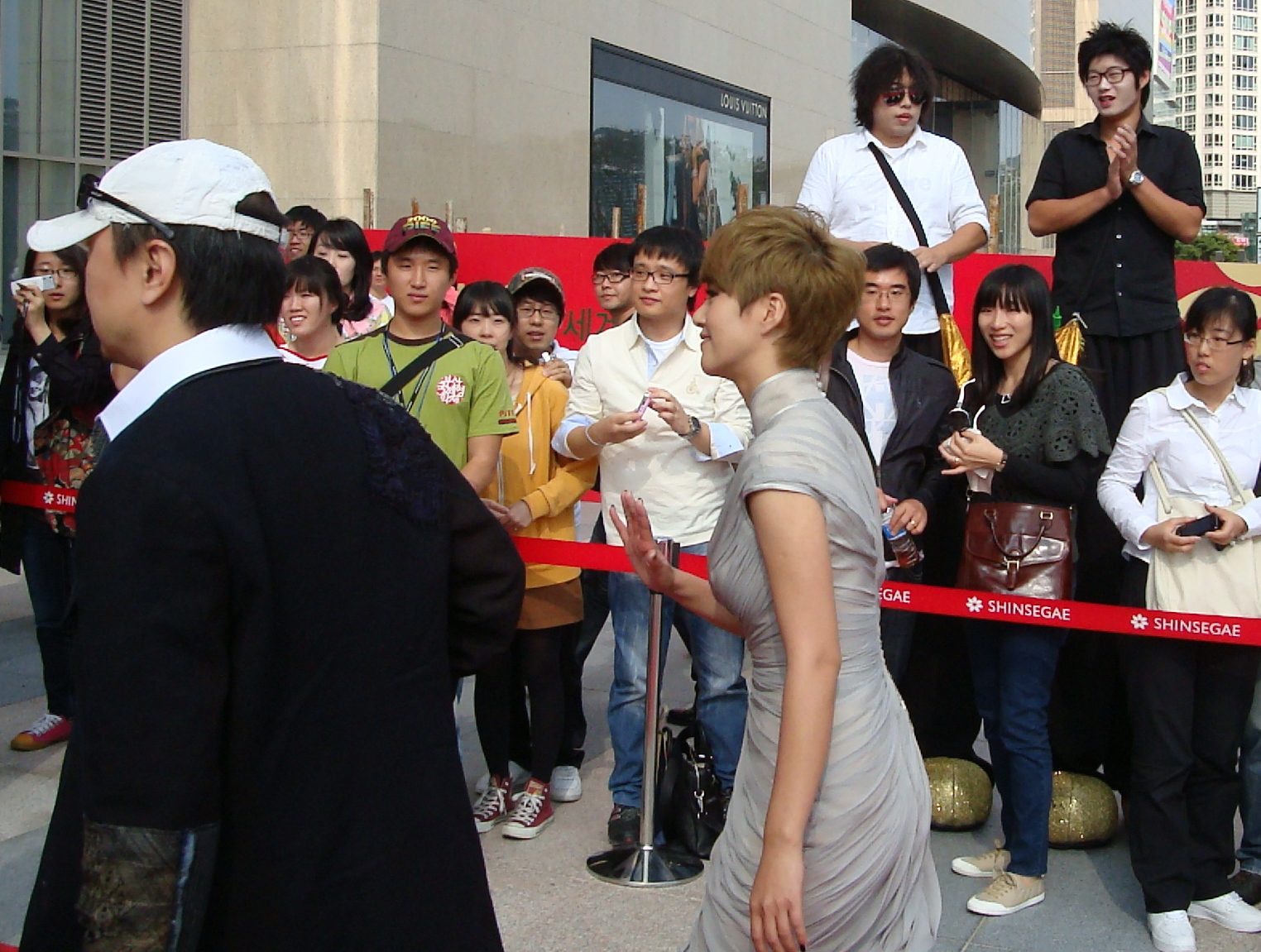
Cui (left) at the 2009 Busan International Film Festival

In 2006, Cui directed the short film The Age of Repairing Virginity, which was selected for the feature and short film competition categories at that year's Vladivostok International Film Festival. He made a cameo appearance in Jiang Wen's film The Sun Also Rises. He also directed the "future" segment of the 2009 film Chengdu, I Love You. In October, he attended the Busan International Film Festival to promote the film. Following his attendance at the premiere of Chengdu, I Love You in Venice, Cui proceeded to Madrid to hold his debut solo concert in Spain. Bai Qiang produced a 3D concert film and documentary titled Transcendence about Cui Jian, which was screened in Beijing in May 2012 for an enthusiastic fan audience, though its prospects for mainstream release in China remain doubtful. The film ultimately grossed 370,000 yuan at the box office.

On 17 October 2014, Cui's feature film Blue Sky Bones was released. Xie Fei stated that the film was submitted to Chinese Film Bureau for review as early as 20 August 2012. However, due to its content touching on "Lin Liguo selecting concubines" and homosexual themes, the project has yet to receive approval. The film, a nonlinear tale with a musical theme, tells the story of a young rocker who moonlights as a hacker. It won the Special Mention at the 8th Rome Film Festival and the Special Jury Prize at the 10th Jecheon International Music & Film Festival, earning Cui Best New Director at the 2015 Chinese Film Media Awards. Receiving mixed reviews, the film grossed 4.14 million yuan at the box office.

On 18 May 2006, Cui issued a statement addressing the Dou Wei incident, calling for sound legislation on news reporting and strong protection of artists' privacy. He submitted a bid proposal to design the 2008 Summer Olympics opening ceremony to the Beijing Organizing Committee for the Olympic Games, but was eliminated after the first round of presentations. In November 2012, Cui announced plans to open a security guard company, citing dissatisfaction with the behavior of security guards at rock concerts in China. On 16 April 2013, Cui released his compilation album The 3rd Sound of China via global digital music platforms for the first time. On 17 April, Cui unveiled a custom "Blue Bone" smartphone to interact better with his fans. He is first artist to launch his own custom smartphone in China. Cui was invited to perform on the 2014 CMG New Year's Gala. It has been seen as the final stage of Cui's political rehabilitation. However, he eventually withdrew the show after organisers tried to censor his performance. For this action, he was listed on the Human Rights Foundation's list of Outstanding Work in the Field of Human Rights. In September, Cui and fellow songwriters co-founded China's first musician-initiated copyright agency.

On 18 July 2006, Cui was awarded the "Hall of Fame Musician" accolade at the Chinese Music Media Awards. He was invited to present himself at the 20th anniversary of the Goethe-Institut on 1 November 2008, where he was awarded the title of "Goethe Cultural Ambassador". Southern Weekly named him the "2012 Chinese Dream Practitioner". In 2013, Cui was honored with the Tenco Cultural Operator Award at the Premio Tenco ceremony in Italy, and collaborated with Francesco Baccini in a joint performance.

=== 2015–present ===
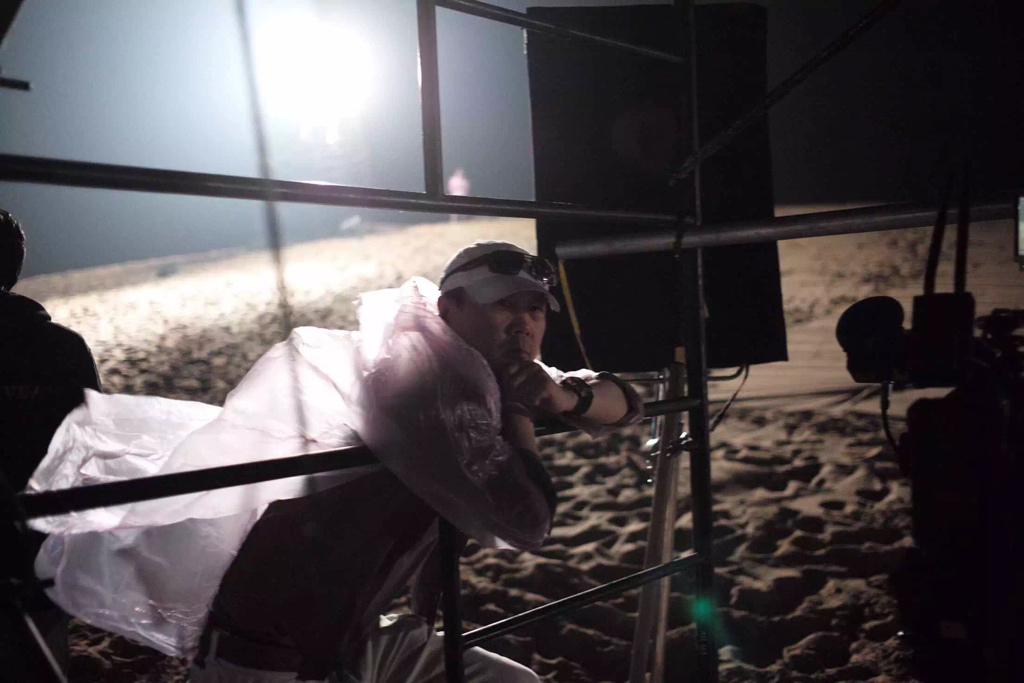
Cui on the set of the micro-film Outside Girl

In 2015, Cui was asked to act as one of the three judges on China Star, a singing talent show broadcast on Dragon Television. On the show, Cui criticized Hong Kong singer Andy Hui for performing a Cantonese oldie, and expressed dissatisfaction that "no more modern or younger Hong Kong artists had appeared on mainland stages to showcase their voices". Initium Media commentator Zhang Miao stated that several Hong Kong media outlets had published false reporting and defamed Cui in their coverage of the incident. Hong Kong writer Lit Foo thought Cui's remarks were distorted by Hong Kong columnist Chip Tsao out of a pan-political bias stemming from Hong Kong separatism, ignoring Cui's admiration for Hong Kong singers like Tat Ming Pair. On 4 December, the China Star program team issued a statement demanding that Chip Tsao and Apple Daily publicly apologize for the false reporting about Cui.

On 25 December of the same year, Cui collaborated with Sony Music to release the album Frozen Light, regarded as his musical comeback. The single "Outside Girl" featured in the album, along with its same-titled music micro-film, premiered on YouTube on 24 December. Pre-orders for the album's digital version surpassed one million copies. It received mixed reviews from critics.

On 26 September 2016, Cui led a 953-person rock band from the Beijing Contemporary Music Academy to perform at a venue in Tianjin, earning certification from Guinness World Records as the largest performing rock band. On 30 September, Cui held the "Rolling 30" concert at Beijing Workers' Gymnasium to mark the 30th anniversary of his career. Chinese avant-garde architect Ma Yansong designed the stage. During the performance, Cui performed a Mandarin cover of Message in a Bottle, while Stewart Copeland, drummer of The Police, joined the show as a guest performer. Concurrently, he commenced the "Rolling 30" tour. In October, he made a donation to support a Trip.com Group-sponsored initiative for the music education of left-behind children. Cui served as the ambassador for the 2017 Croisements Festival, a cross-cultural event between China and France. On 23 August 2017, Cui released Rock Symphony Live Concert, containing the full recordings of the Rock Symphony Live Concert. On 4 November of the same year, Cui performed an electronic music concert as a DJ for the first time at the Chishui Valley Music Festival. He stated that this performance was a tribute to Igor Stravinsky, the original composer of The Rite of Spring.

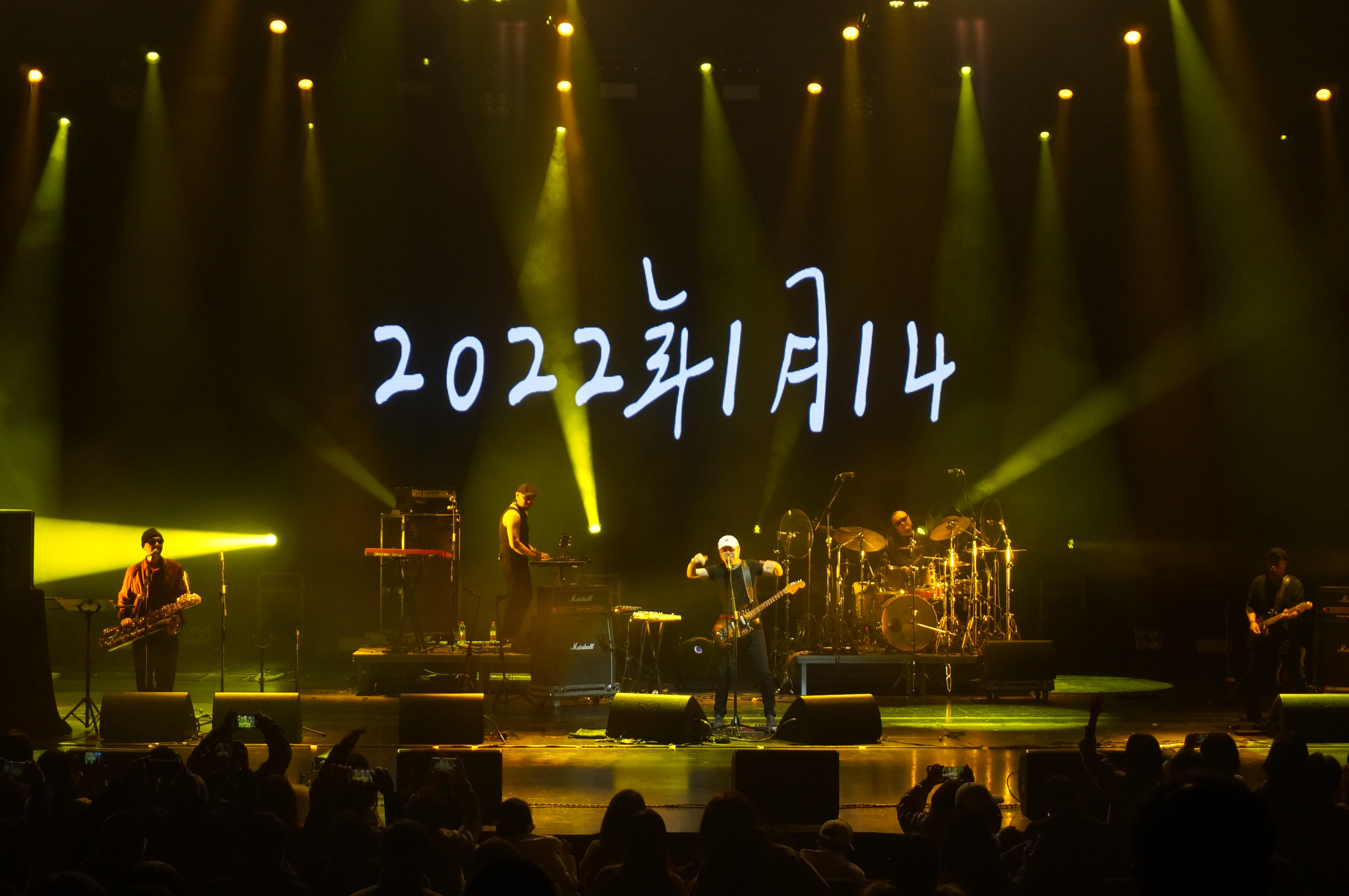
Cui performing in 2022, Changsha

On 27 August 2021, Cui released the album A Flying Dog. The public interpreted the album as the resurgence of his critical feature, although Cui noted he has never ceased being critical. Cui was nominated for Best Producer at the 2021 Asian Pop Music Awards for the album. It was also listed among the Top 20 Albums of the Year by the jury. The single "The B-Side of Time" became the highest-scoring rock song of the year on the 2021 TME Chart. Critic Li Wan believed the album represents a return to form for Chinese rock.

At the 33rd Golden Melody Awards, A Flying Dog received four nominations — Best Mandarin Male Singer, Best Vocal Recording Album, Best Mandarin Album, and Album of the Year. Ultimately, Cui won the Best Mandarin Male Singer award, making him the first mainland Chinese musician to receive this honor. Taiwanese audiences were generally surprised by this result. Chinese-language news magazine WHYNOT praised this decision reflects the confidence and courage of the jury.

An online "Keep Going Wild" concert held by Cui on 15 April 2022 drew 46 million views and 120 million likes, breaking the viewership record for online concerts. In August 2022, Cui published Poetry Collection of Cui Jian: 1986–2021, compiling 56 lyrics written over 35 years. On the 2023 world music collaborative album Police Beyond Borders by Stewart Copeland and Ricky Kej, Cui covered The Police's single "Tea in the Sahara". Cui staged the "Rolling Power" Snow Mountain Zhijiao Concert on 22 December 2023, drawing 36 million online viewers. Subsequently, the documentary Snow Mountain Music Revelation, which chronicles the 2002 Snow Mountain Music Festival, was released. On 21 December 2024, Cui kicked off the "Keep Going Wild" tour in Chengdu. As the sound director of Beijing's Sea Strings Restaurant, Cui has held the weekly "Electronic Music & Remix Gala Dinner" at the restaurant since 17 July 2025. His first theater work, S.M.A.X, which premiered at the 2026 Aranya Theater Festival in Qinhuangdao, Hebei, explores the "spiritual dilemmas of humanity in the age of technology".

== Artistry ==
=== Musical styles ===
Mr. Cui's band was reminiscent of the bottom-heavy jazz-rock of Morphine, the ska-pop of Madness, the Irish rock jigs of the Pogues and even the drum-and-bass of Roni Size. But it was not an effortless collage; it was one in which the seams were always obvious, and in many ways reminiscent of the fractured progressive rock that began leaking out of Eastern Europe in the 1970's and 80's. … His songs arced from early sing-along guitar rock ballads ... to ... a rhythmic obsession with rap, funk and sample-heavy dance music.

— Neil Strauss in The New York Times

"The Last Complaint"
Cui combines traditional Chinese instruments and Western rock elements. Sample of "The Last Complaint" from Balls Under the Red Flag (1994) show the use of guzheng.

A multi-instrumentalist who resists the mainstream music industry's tendency towards a division of labor, Cui writes his own music, lyrics, and arrangements, as well as handles production, recording, and mixing himself. Some consider him to be the first indie musician in China. Cui incorporates elements of pop, reggae, blues, funk, ska, soul, disco, hip-hop, jazz, folk, country, Qinqiang, Northwest Wind, new wave, hard rock, punk, post-punk, hardcore, electronic music and EDM into his works. (Note: Attributed to multiple references:) Chicago Tribune called it an "almost anarchic eclecticism". He is considered to have drawn inspiration from jazz fusion in his creative approach. Cui also incorporated traditional Chinese instruments into his music compositions, and borrowed much from the Chinese folk music in music forms. He explained that it isn't because he wants to broadcast or promote Chinese traditional art, but rather because when he uses those instruments, they help him express his true emotions. His music has been compared to that of David Byrne and Prince. The Independent described his music as a "sometimes bewildering mix of styles that reflects his two biggest influences, Miles Davis and The Clash, and his classical background", while Chrissy Hey from Cashbox described his performance as a Springsteen/Marc Bolan hybrid.

Cui pioneered the use of rap in the Chinese music scene, which sharply contrasted with the mainstream Hong Kong-Taiwan pop and campus folk songs of the time. He combined rap and hip-hop with northern folk music, free jazz, and reggae. In the late 1990s Cui began to experiment on digital avant-rock with elements of rap music. Jeroen de Kloet wrote for UNESCO Courier that Cui carries on with the rapper's staccato precision. In the album Show You Colour, Cui employed dialect rapping to address Mandarin's rhythmic limitations, with its "top speed capped at shulaibao and kuaibanshu". His style in the album has been described as similar to abstract hip hop, instrumental hip hop or The Philadelphia Experiment. He also uses delay in some of his hip-hop works to make these tracks listen "less hip-hop". Maria Cheng from SFGate described him as a Beastie Boys-style rapper laden with Peking Opera-style recitation.

Cui considers electronic music "connected to the times, creative, belongs to the young". Influenced by The Chemical Brothers, starting with the album The Power of the Powerless, Cui incorporated electronic and MIDI elements into his music, independently producing the work at home using digital music technology. He frequently uses electronic techniques such as programming, sampling and looping, and distortion effects. Cui always samples various quyi, as well as Chinese folk songs like Hua'er. Social environment soundscapes are often included. He also incorporates techno beats and breakbeats into his songs, and draws influence from electronica and post-rock. To add Chinese timbres into his work, he connected guqin and pipa to effects units, transforming them into electronic versions. Some songs from the album Show You Colour features noise music, sound collages and electronic jazz. Taipei Times dubbed him "China's godfather of electric rock". In 2007, Cui collaborated with DJ Hyper, Hybrid and Sugar Daddy to remix some of his classic tracks from the '80s.

=== Themes and lyrics ===
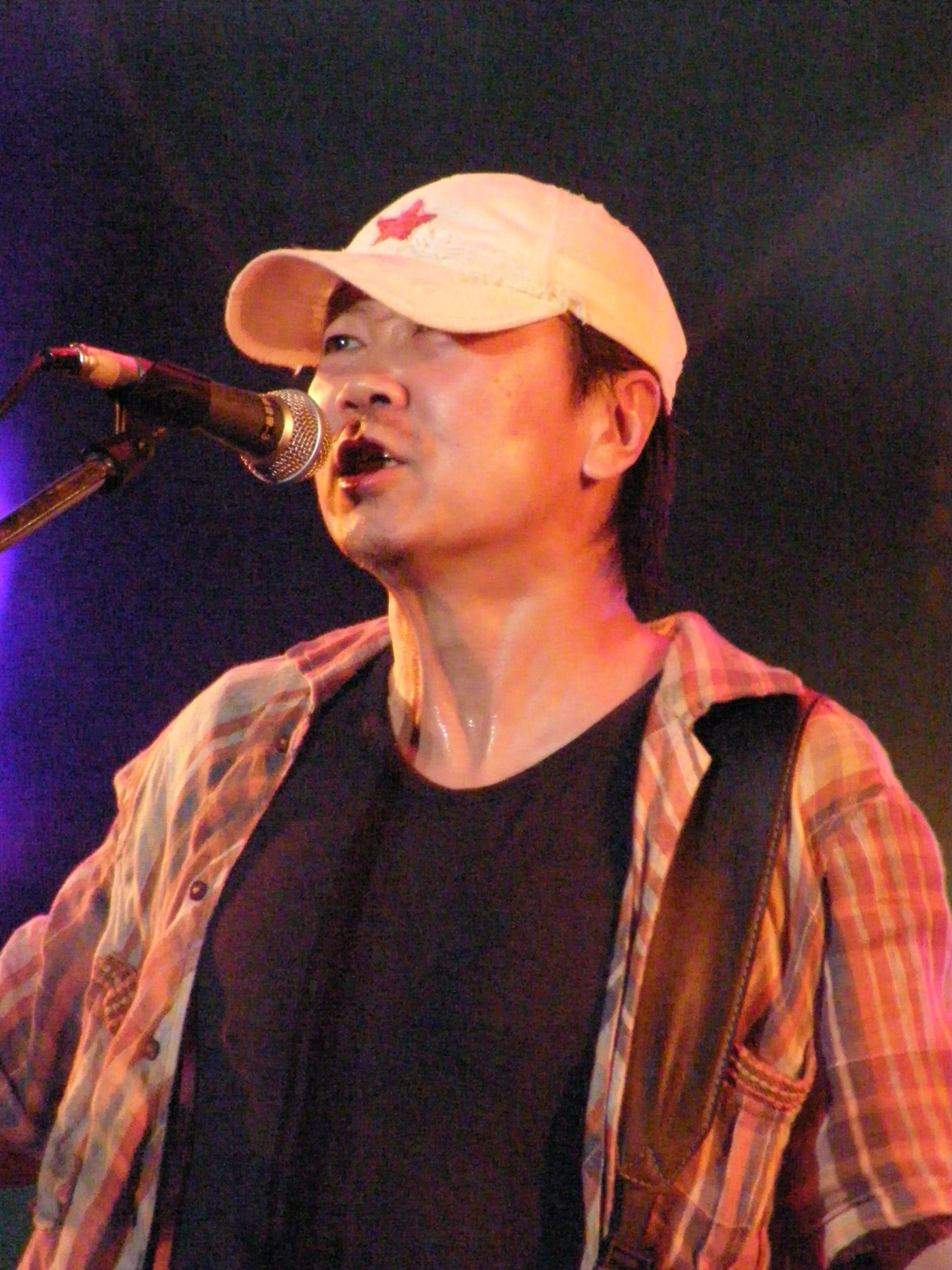
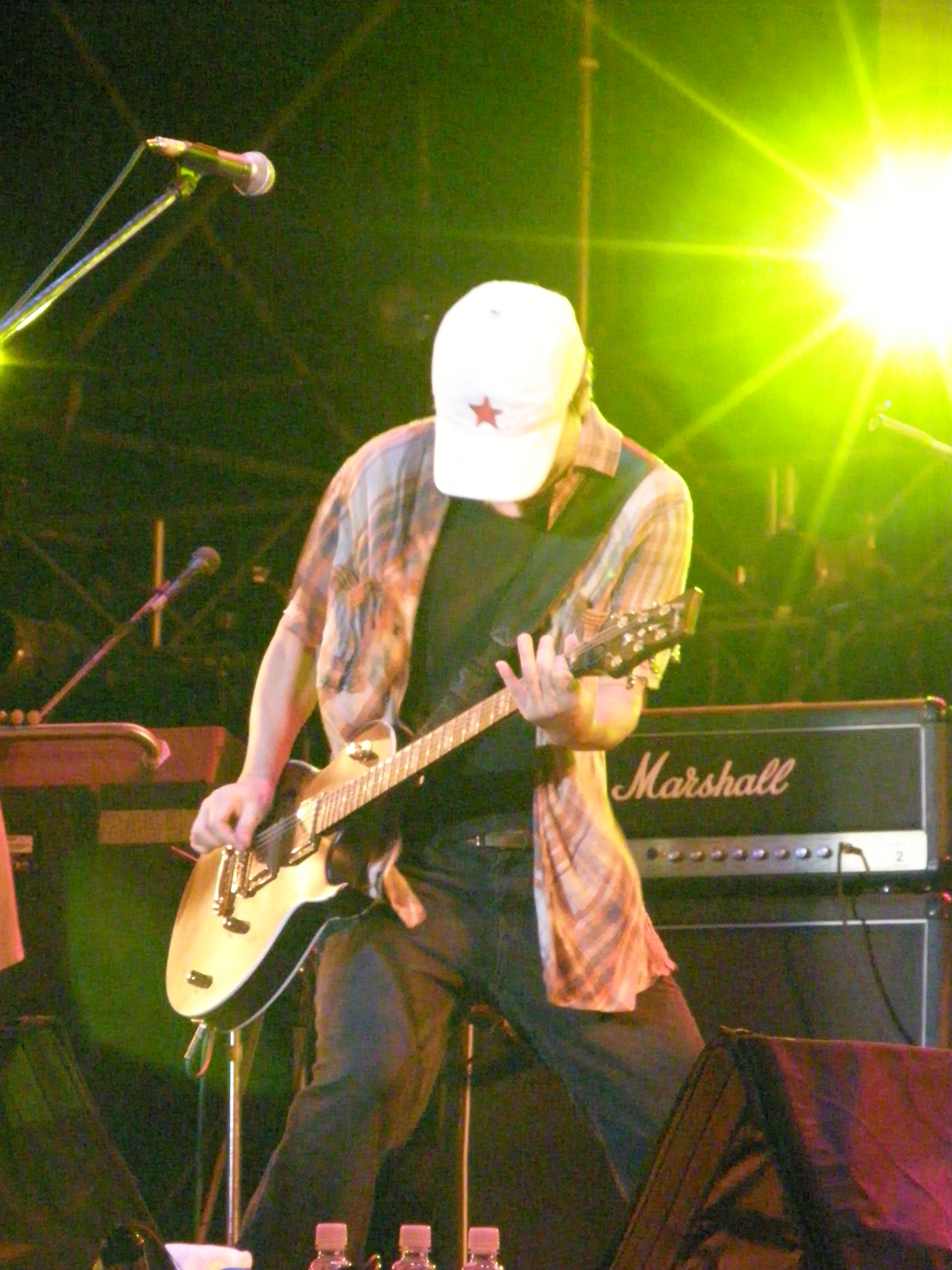
Cui Jian at the Hohaiyan Rock Festival in Taiwan, 2007

Cui's music idea mainly revolves around rebellious and resistance, making introspection and irony to the tradition while exploring people's living condition. His works convey his reflections on the history of the motherland, introspection of the state of life, longing for a "utopian" beautiful future, and questions to the nationalism and materialist Zeitgeist of post-1989 China. His songs were also the earliest in Chinese music to tackle the subject of sex, sometimes touching on topics of masturbation that "not many rock songs ever deal with, even in the U.S.". According to CNN correspondent Jaime FlorCruz, Cui's songs are "sometimes amusing, sometimes plaintive but often overtly political" and challenge "conventional Chinese ideas and attitudes". Jonathan Matusitz described Cui's music as "insurgent and anarchic", music whose lyrics denounce China's corruption, hypocrisy, outlandish "self-righteousness", and the rejection of idealism.

Cui said that the ratio of time he spends composing music versus writing lyrics is 20:1. His lyrics are nearly grammatically incoherent and are considered to be postmodernism, expressing the pursuit of idealism and identity, alienation, disillusionment, and the craving for personal freedom and sexual desire. Conceptual metaphors are widely present in the lyrics of Cui's albums. According to Junru Huang of The Times, largely by writing ambiguous lyrics, Cui has skilfully become a symbol of freedom to many without becoming an Ai Weiwei-esque martyr of the arts. Italian rock musician Francesco Baccini believed that Cui's lyrics largely focus on marginalized communities and touch on politically sensitive topics. Besides, he was the earliest artist to use Chinese swear words like "qù nǐ māde" (fuck off) in song lyrics. He also frequently employed sexually suggestive. According to Jilin University music professor Pang Zhonghai, Cui's creative work featured many elements of irony, black humor, and absurdity, possessing a certain avant-garde and pioneering paradigm.

Cui's lyrics draw on the expressive techniques of modern Chinese poetry and influenced by the Misty Poetry movement. Some of his works feature frequent use of short sentence and simple sentence structures, while others employ a more colloquial style. He also used poetic devices such as repetition, rhyme, alliteration, and assonance. Chen Sihe, a Fudan University professor, described Cui as "contemporary chief rock poet". Taiwanese poet Yu Kwang-chung called him China's "great poet like Lennon". Chinese writer Wang Shuo called Cui "contemporary China's greatest troubadour". Xie Mian stated that Cui's lyrics constitute important component parts of modern Chinese poetry history, possessing high value as poetry. Jianying Zha wrote that Cui's lyrics were "the best Chinese poetry of our time".

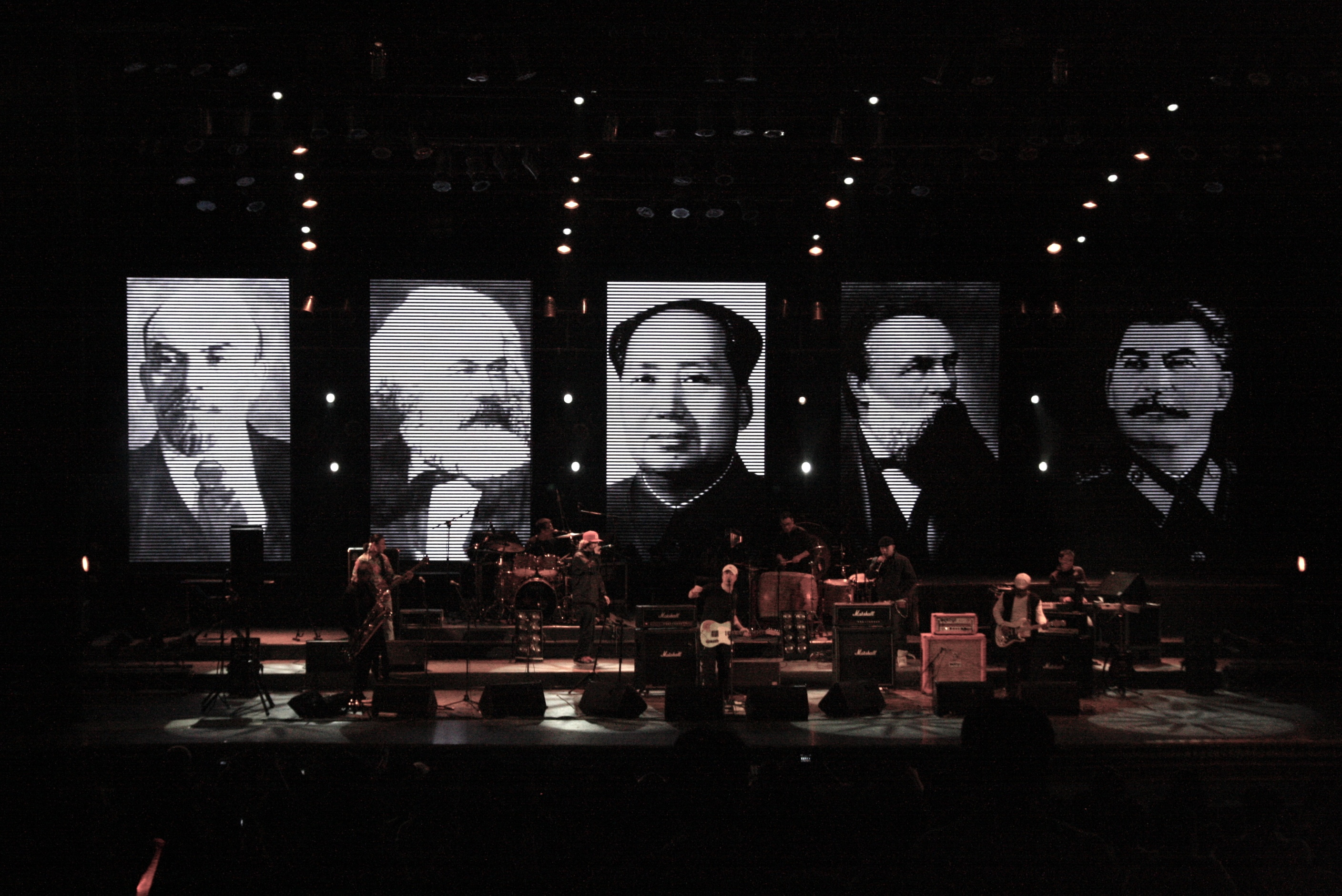
Cui performing in Beijing, 2009. His parody of political symbols in his works is regarded as deconstructive and subversive.

Cui's works saturate political symbols like red flags, color red, (political) movements, the Long March, revolution, which he deconstructively parodies and ridicules from a personalized perspective. Such subversive "political parody" was often seen as disrespectful at the time. Dai Jinhua said that through parody, Cui accomplished both a burial of an era and a reconfiguration of the memory of the times, constituting an "astonishingly destructive rearticulation or replication". Cultural critic Rey Chow wrote that due to Cui's playful use of these symbols, the authorities negated his music, intending to impose a forced cultural memory to emphasize respect for the Communist predecessors.

The term "guniang" (girl) is frequently used in Cui's texts, signifying varied personas. This imagery has often been interpreted as an eroticization of political themes. Taiwanese lyric scholar Hu Yu-tien thought that Cui's lyrics carry on the tradition originating from Chu Ci of using "beauty" as a metaphor for the ruler, while interweaving romantic love with patriotic sentiment. Rachel DeWoskin of Words Without Borders also noted that Cui's songs inherit the "tried and true manner" of court poets and essayists from China's imperial past, appearing to be about love but actually about history and contemporary China. Malaysian columnist Tan Wei Guang described Cui as "writing about the nation like a lover and transforming political awakening into love songs". Music journalist Zhou Jian called it a "Spring and Autumn brushwork".

=== Vocal style ===
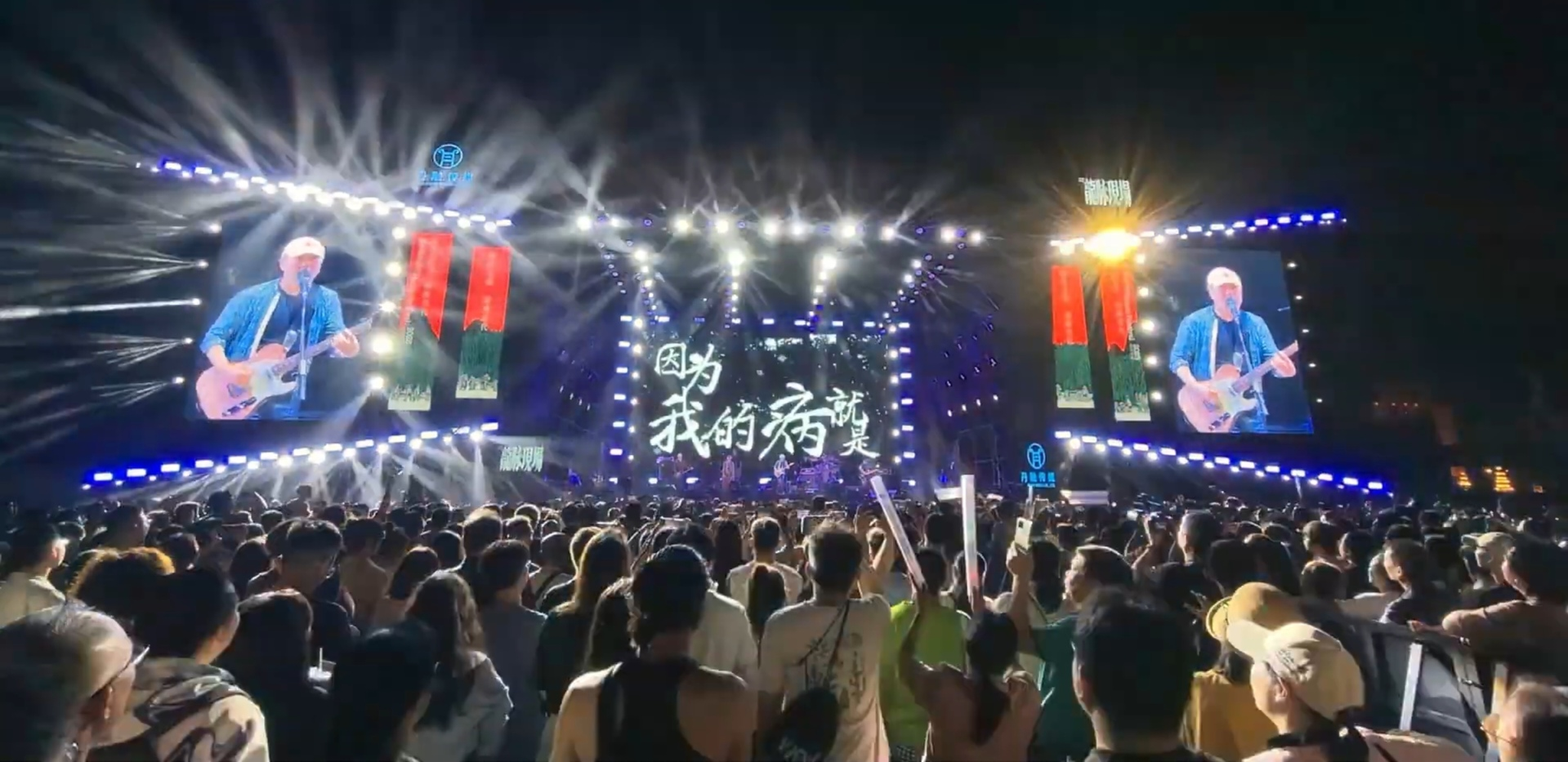
Cui performing in 2025, Nandan

Cui sings in a pinched, hoarse voice with "guttural yet passionate" vocals, blending the folk singing techniques represented by Li Guyi with bel canto and breathy singing. He used mostly his modal voice from lower middle to high notes, with his delivery almost entirely in forte, and employed many short portamentos, vibratos and sighings. He can also sings in ascending falsettos. Agreeing that language should not overshadow music, Cui deliberately obscures the accuracy of pronunciation in lyrics by omitting vowels, forcefully articulating labiodental affricates, and employing rapid, consecutive same-pitch note patterns in melodies, making the lyrics difficult to recognize. Believing that the four tones of the Putonghua impose an undue restriction on the rhythmization of the language, he has long experimented with rhythmizing Chinese language, using it as an instrument to make compound rhythms. Besides, he often uses non-lexical vocables such as ooh. His blurred enunciation marks a deliberate departure from 1990s pop music, which emphasized "precise articulation and polished vocals".

Daniel Southerland from The Washington Post described Cui's voice "sounds like a cross between Bob Dylan, Bruce Springsteen and Joe Strummer of the Clash". British sinologist Gregory B. Lee called it a raucous, guttural Beijing proletarian street accent. According to Jinan University professor Shuwen Qu, Cui's signature voice, constraining the vocal cords to make a husky and boorish sound, resembles that of the "cock rock" voice tradition. Of The Power of the Powerless, Larry Katz of Boston Herald compared his vocal to Kurt Cobain, and wrote that Cui snarls, spits and barks out his lyrics in a gruff voice seething with resentment. Taiwanese musician Li Pai-kang praised Cui for his "highly individualistic vocals and articulation" and his reinvention of vocal expression within Chinese rock music.

=== Videography and stage ===
Chinese Sixth Generation filmmaker Zhang Yuan directed the music videos for "Piece of Red Cloth", "Wild on the Snow", "Last Shot", and "Flying". Zhang stated that he always filmed Cui as a hero, because in his perception, Cui was "a hero imbued with power". The video for "Piece of Red Cloth" won special mention at the Golden Gate Viewers awards ceremonies at the 1992 San Francisco Film Festival. The "Wild on the Snow" video won the International Viewer's Choice Award for MTV Asia in 1991. In 2005, Cui teamed up with Flash artist Lao Jiang to release the animated video for his song "Mr. Red". Cui held a negative view toward music videos in his later career. For his 2021 songs "A Flying Dog" and "The B-Side of Time", he filmed live-performance music videos blending genuine onstage performances with visual elements, aiming to "defend the inherent qualities of live music".

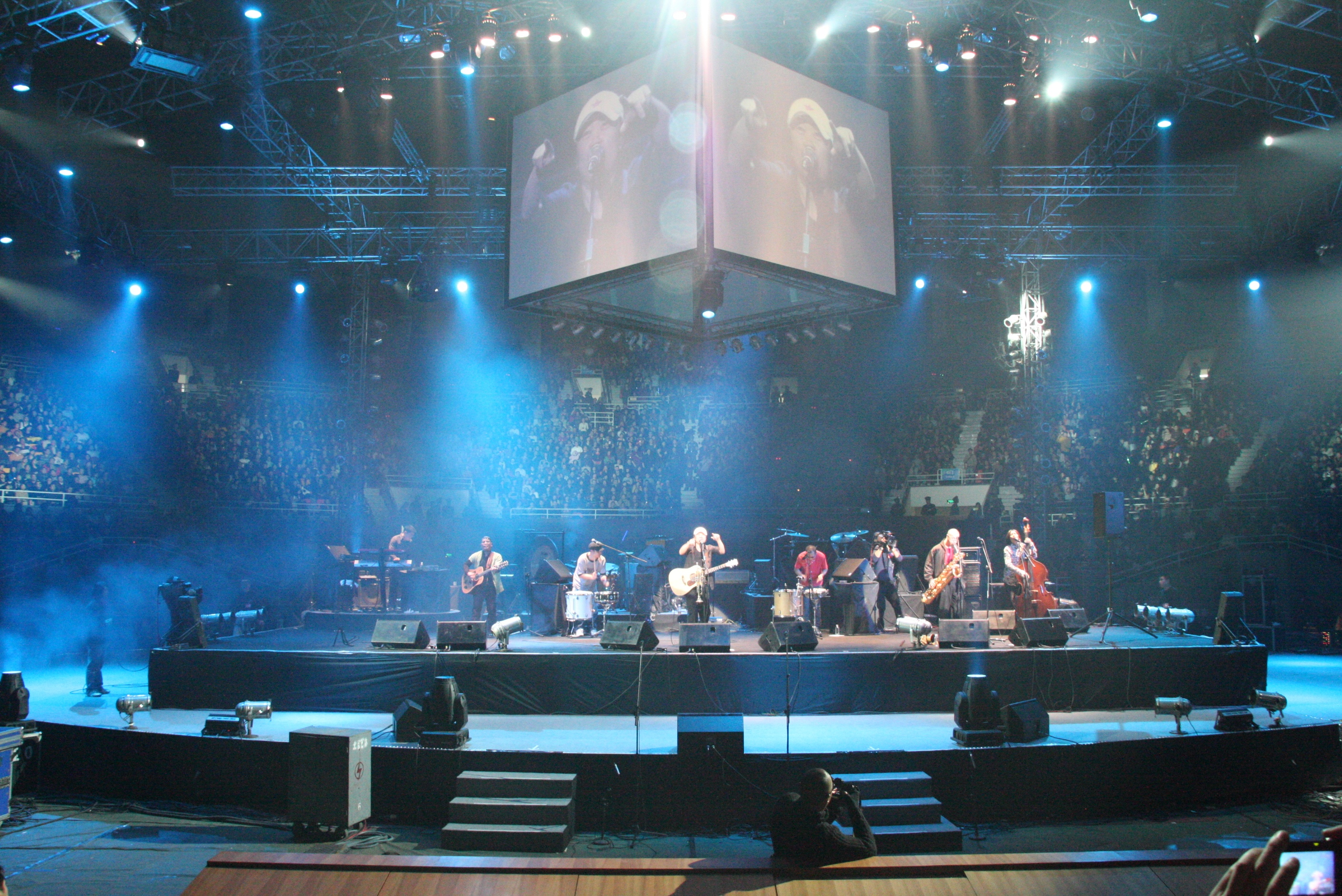
Cui Jian at Workers' Gymnasium during his concert in 2008. He himself served as the artistic director.

Cui Jian is described as frequently engaging in "intricate and dazzling experiments in musical craftsmanship" during his live performances. He said that the most wishful way of death for him is to die on the stage, not on the bed or sofa at home. At his 2008 Chengdu concert, Cui invited Chinese gymnast Li Donghua as a special guest, who appearing on stage with a pommel horse. In 2010, Cui became the first mainland Chinese musician to tour across China and stage over 1,000 live performances. In 2017, Cui made his debut as a DJ for a solo electronic live performance at the Chishui Valley Music Festival, without singing throughout the entire performance.

=== Apparel and accessory ===
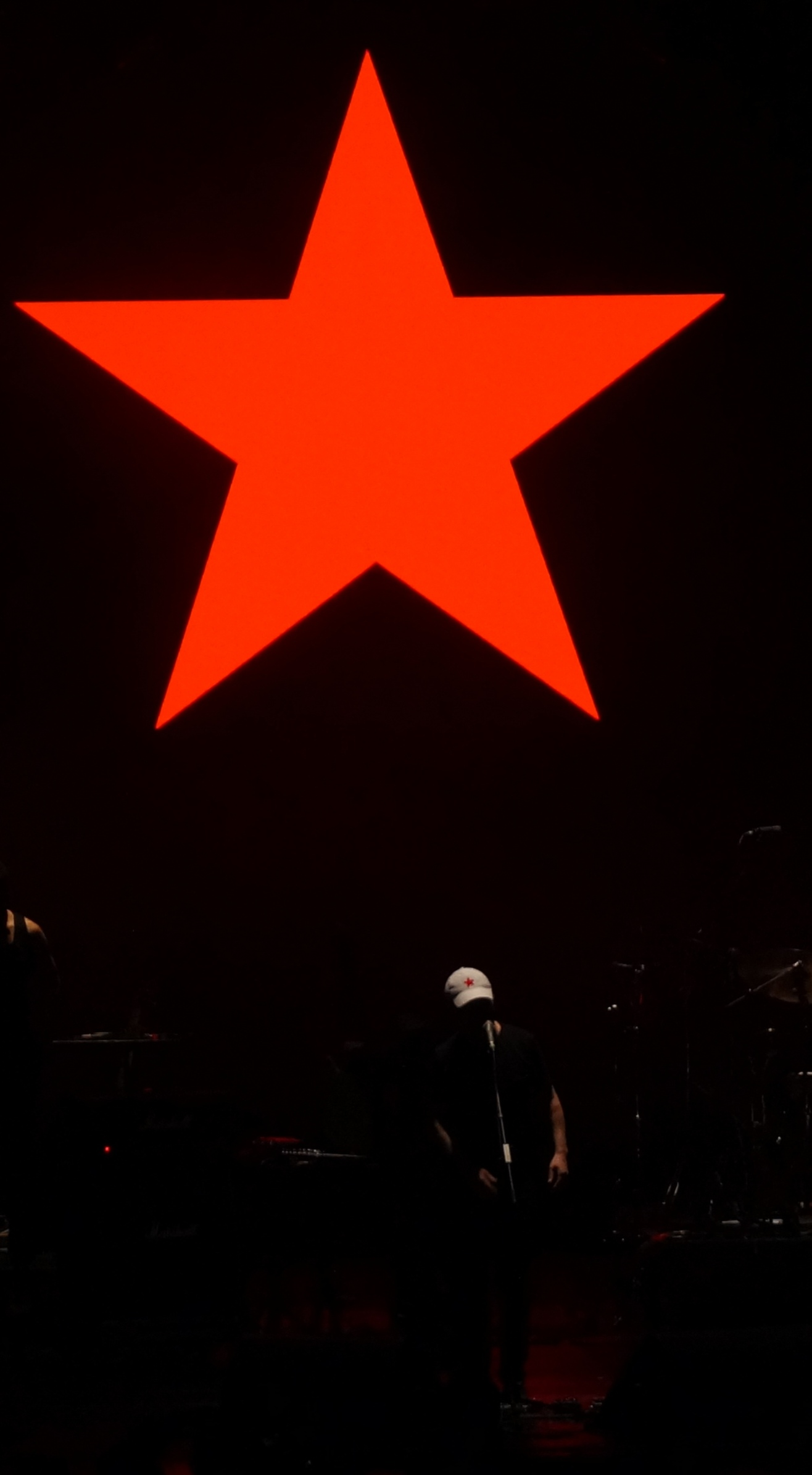
Cui uses the red star as his symbol and wears a white baseball cap with that symbol.

Cui's costume has been characterised as "bricolage" and a bodily embodiment of postmodernism. He used to wear a green People's Liberation Army uniform jacket at live performances and in music videos. It has been interpreted as a "subversive sartorial recontexutalization" or an expression of nostalgia. His uneven pant legs are considered a mockery of symmetry and propriety. Cui also wore grunge clothing in his 1990s' stages. In his 21st-century live performances, he has sometimes worn retro and introspective stage costumes, such as floral shirts and traditional Nakhi ethnic clothing, to create stark contrasts with the trendy electronic music he performed. In 2005, Beijing fashion designer Feng Ling designed a new stage jacket for him that featured green linen with red silk lining in 1960s style.

Cui often appears wearing a white baseball cap with a bright red star. Cui said he initially wore the hat because he wanted to control his exposure, and he can lower his head and no one can tell who him is. He intentionally distressed the hat to look worn-out because that's "interesting". German journalist Christof Siemes believed Cui reverses the colors of the Chinese flag, where the big yellow star on a red background stands for the Communist Party, appropriating and deconstructing the state symbol. He usually blindfolded himself with a piece of red cloth when performing his song "Piece of Red Cloth".

== Legacy ==
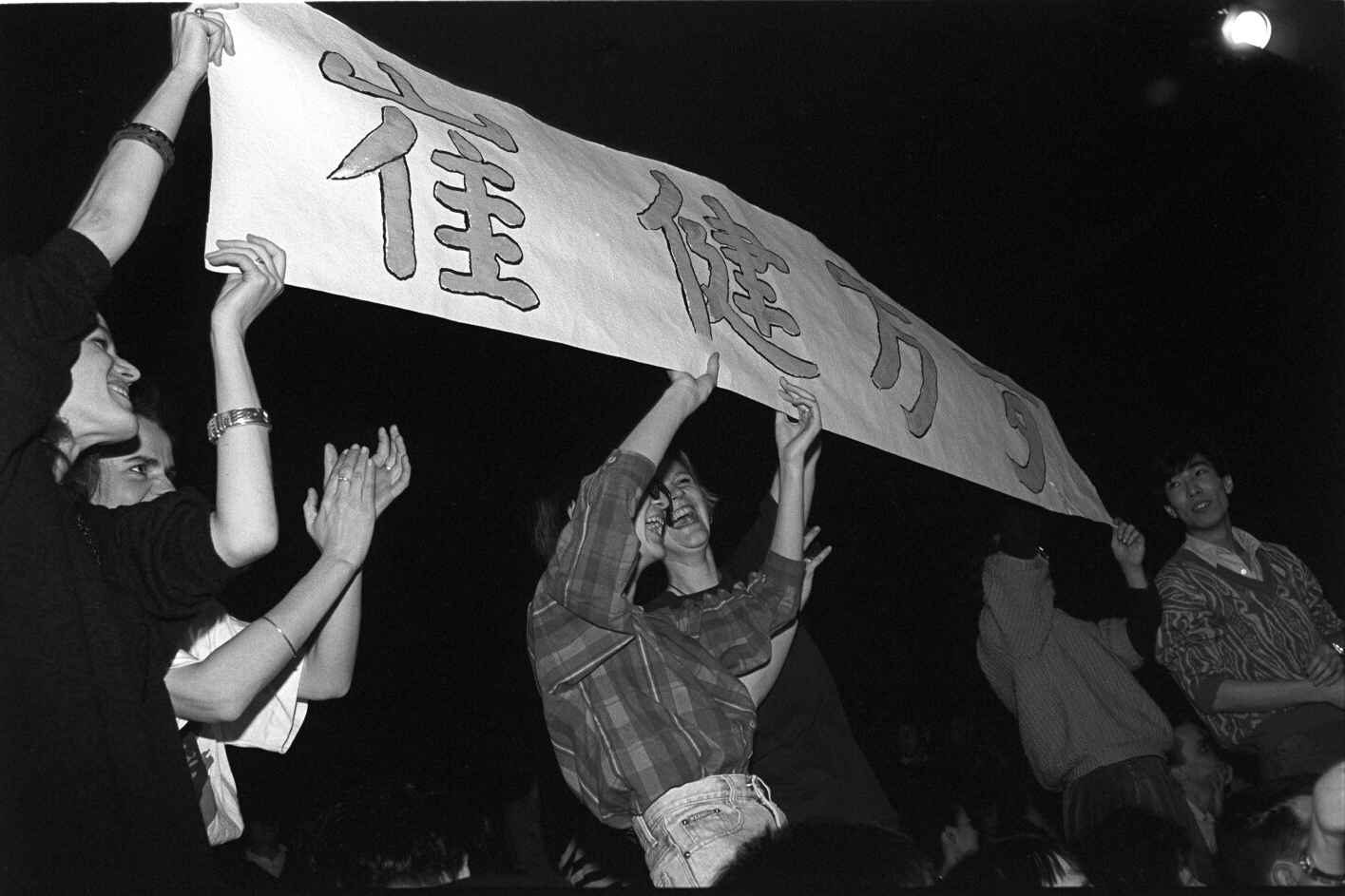
During Cui Jian's 1993 performance in Germany, the audience held up a banner reading "Long Live Cui Jian" (Chinese: 崔健万岁).

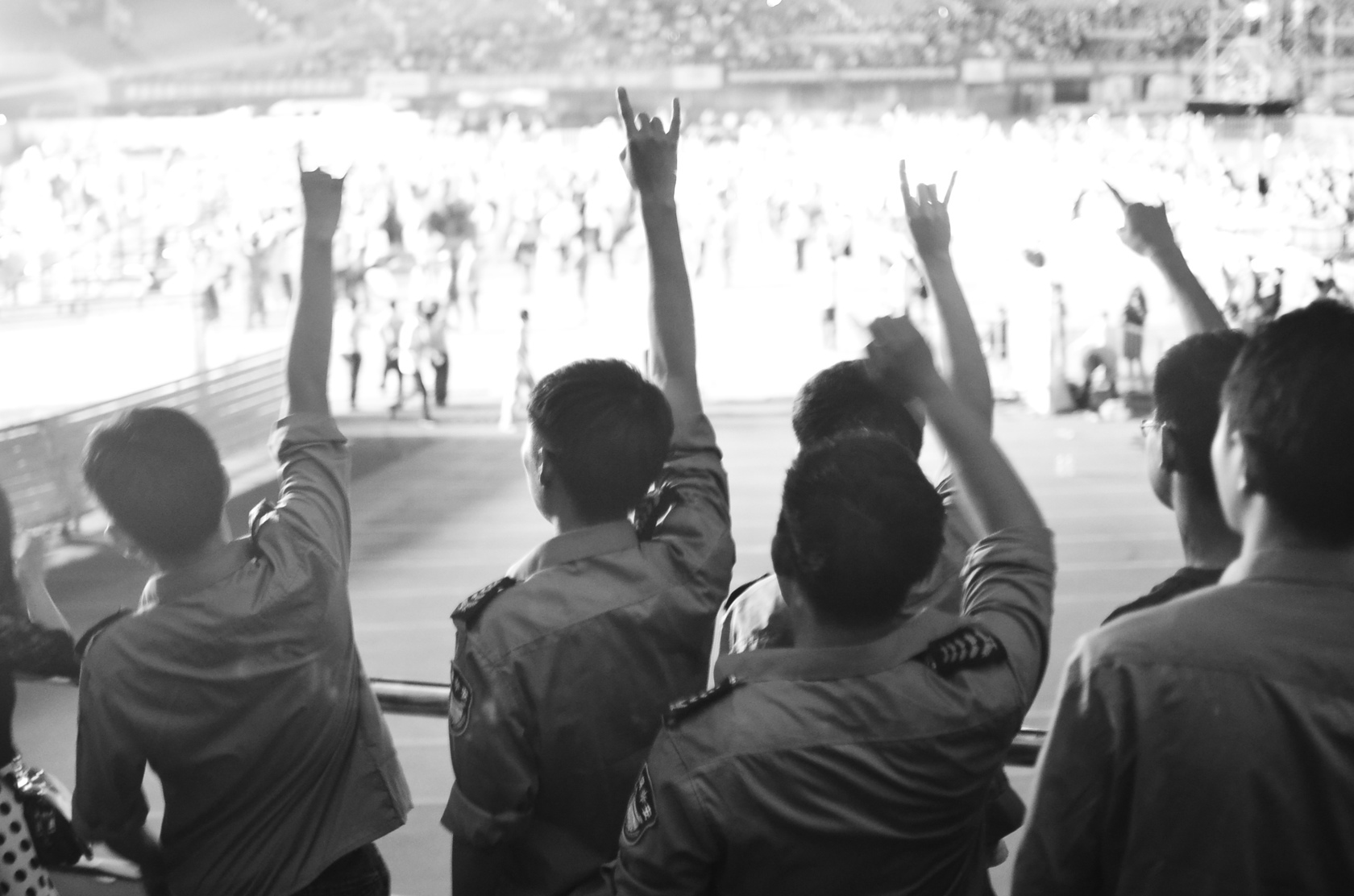
Some security guards giving the sign of the horns to Cui during his performance, Qinhuangdao, 2014.

Cui is credited with popularizing rock throughout China, and with being a trailblazer in Chinese progressive music. He's been called the "Father of Chinese Rock", "Grandfather of Chinese Rock", "Godfather of Chinese Rock", "Emperor of Chinese Rock", "Chinese King of Rock", and "China's God of Rock". As Cui became a national phenomenon, his rock music gained widespread, fervent popularity among youth and led him to be referenced as the voice of his generation, while simultaneously facing fierce opposition from socially conservative forces that dubbed him a "freak of this era". In Western countries, Cui is often compared as the Chinese equivalent of John Lennon, Elvis Presley, Bob Dylan, Kurt Cobain, Bruce Springsteen, Prince, and Johnny Hallyday, and is recognized for his anti-establishment persona. British journalist Jasper Becker wrote in 1995 that Cui is usually known as China's greatest rock star. Billboard called him "the lone voice of originality in Chinese music". Matthew Corbin Clark of PBS described Cui as "a bizarre concoction of post-Communist celebrity, cross-cultural artistic transfer, David & Goliath political dynamics, and inspired musicianship". Die Tageszeitung named him the most successful Chinese rock musician of all time. Jo Ling Kent from CNN wrote that Cui led a "musical counterculture that is redefining what it means to be 'Made in China'". In Newsweek, Melinda Liu described him as the godfather of China's new music.

=== Public image ===
Cui is recognized as a cultural icon, a pop icon, a teen idol, a fashion icon, an icon of the punk subculture, and one of the most famous iconic figures in contemporary Chinese art. He is seen as one of the most popular critical voices in the nation. Unlike Teresa Teng who occupied a liberated position after the Reform and opening up, Cui took on the role of a "rebel" in the 1980s. He and his music were regarded as symbols of rebellious youth and an oppositional educated class. Xue Manzi stated that Cui brought "the most sincere and rebellious voice". During the 1989 Tiananmen Square protests, his music evolved into anthems of self-determination. In 1990, The Washington Post said Cui is an "unauthorized hero" or "antihero" for many youths in China. Since 1991, South Korean media have consistently emphasized Cui's ethnic identity in reporting news. In response, Cui stated that he had never seriously considered his own ethnic identity, stressing that individuality matters more and that he is Chinese.

For many people, this undisputed pioneer of Chinese rock remains their sole hero. Meanwhile, as the embodiment of an era's cultural revolution, Cui Jian demonstrates a distinct self-awareness of his own and that of his generation's historical position. ... Regardless, for more than one generation of Chinese people, Cui Jian himself constitutes an action sketch map for cultural rebellion.

— Li Dawei of Caixin Weekly

Since the early 1990s Cui has been portrayed in numerous Western media as China's indomitable political conscience. Although "from any end of the left-wing or right-wing spectrum, Cui's presence is so striking that no power can ignore or incorporate him", he often pleads with reporters that he is not a rock star or a political dissident, but a composer.

Since the 2000s, Cui has been perceived more as a nostalgic symbol and spiritual icon representing "marginalization, rebellion, and critical consciousness", rather than a commercial star with mainstream influence. In 2015, Cui said people view him more as "an old man" than a rebel, a familiar face on television but no longer influential. However, according to Japanese journalist Akio Yaita, since the Xi Jinping era began, most singers and musicians have abandoned the pursuit of individuality and freedom to maintain their presence in the Chinese market, while Cui Jian, known for his "free-spirited" style, has regained prominence. A New York Times editorial pointed:

But to his fans - and detractors - he remains the same unrepentant rebel and cynical idealist that he was at 25, tirelessly battling myopic censors, greedy promoters, lip-synching pop stars and anyone else who stands in the way of an artist's right to make good music and an audience's right to enjoy it.

=== Cultural impact ===
Cui's success marked the rise of subculture in China, leading to a social landscape where mainstream culture coexisted with subcultures, and orthodox culture paralleled popular culture. His hairstyle became popular across China, empowering young men to grow long hair. With the release of Rock 'n' Roll on the New Long March, mainland China, Hong Kong, and Taiwan experienced a "Cui Jian Fever" (Chinese: 崔健热). His music "profoundly shook" the cultural and social conduct across these regions in the 1980s and 1990s, and changed the status of Chinese indie music. In Taiwan, although his album was censored by the Government Information Office shortly after its release for "being incompatible with current politics", he still exerted a profound influence on Taiwanese underground rock scene. According to a 1994 report from The Chosun Ilbo, Cui's "powerful rock sound and melody, uniquely hoarse voice, and rich vocal abilities" combine to fuel his rising popularity in Japan.

According to OhmyNews, Cui is revered as a top musician who exerted profound influence on Chinese popular culture. Music critic Huang Liaoyuan wrote that Cui was "the first person in contemporary China to modernize the subject matter of popular music". Chinese singer Cheng Lin stated that Cui is "a banner in the history of music". Gong Linna remarked that Cui pioneered a form of "Chinese rock" that "dug into the roots of Chinese culture". Mongolian singer Daichin Tana called him the "backbone and gall of this land", and described his music as the "hope and despair of this country". Music critic Jin Zhaojun believed that the immense cultural impact generated by Cui stemmed from his "fundamental questioning" of the Chinese people's way of existence.

Jian is not one of those postmodern pretty boys produced by so-called Canto-Pop from Hong Kong, Taiwan, or even Shanghai, schmaltzy singers like Andy Lau or Anthony Wong. He is a true expressionist of his inner self. Perhaps that's why his positions come across so decisively – when they do come.

— Thomas Gross of Die Zeit

Cui exerted a lasting influence on the creative production of rock music in mainland China. Since Northwest Wind and Cui's rock, the experimental use of traditional musical components in the creation of popular music has formed a striking trend. The Beijing News and Sixth Tone have noted that in the 1980s, Cui represented elite culture's resistance against mainstream culture, the production model which led to the successors of Chinese rock music retreating into increasingly marginalized subcultural circles. Music critic Yan Jun wrote: "Ever since Cui Jian, Chinese rock has been seen as an alternative, outsider's and Underground sound."

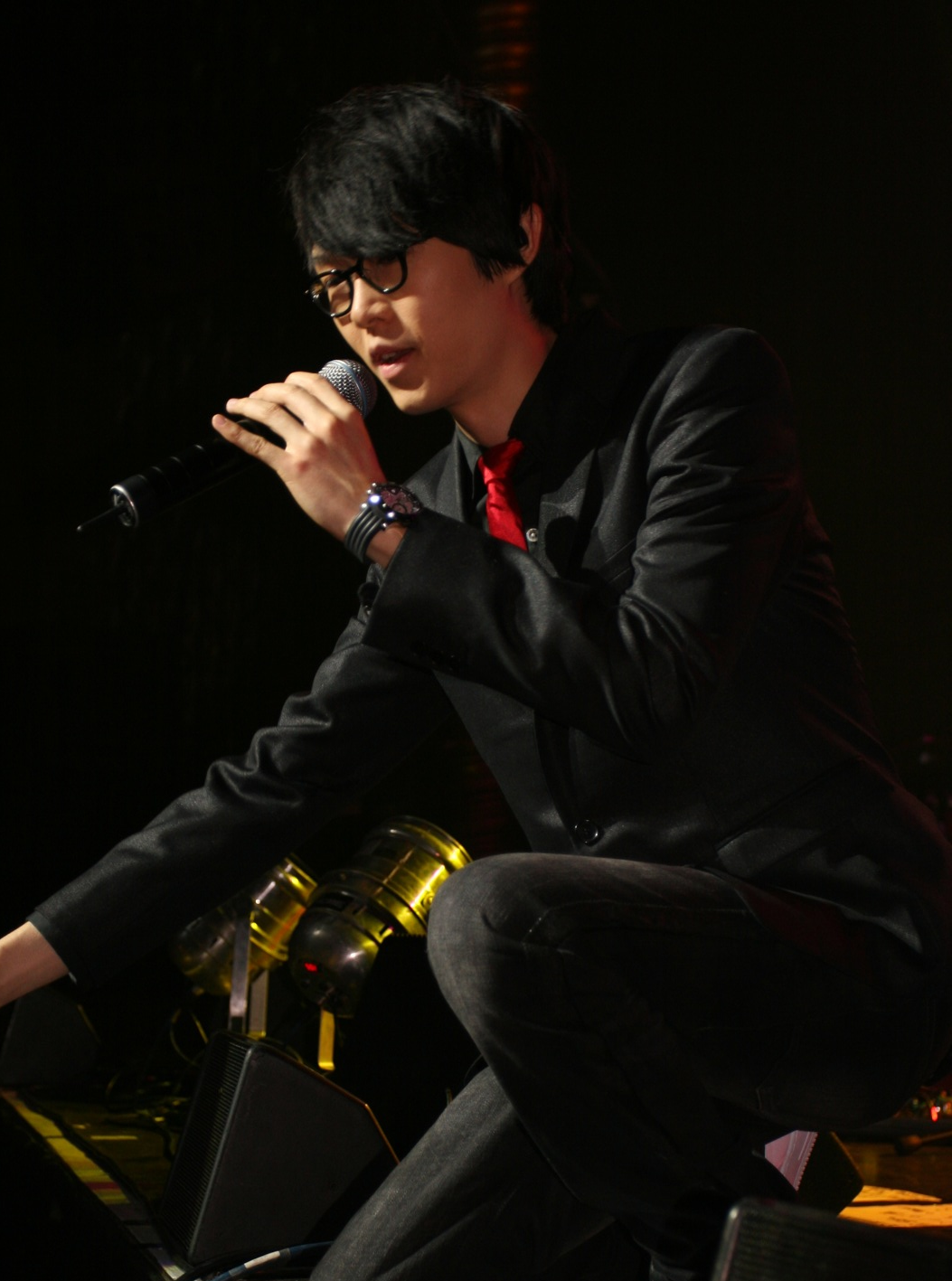
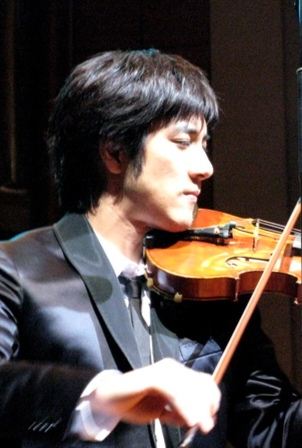
Artists such as Khalil Fong and Wang Leehom have cited Cui as a musical influence

Many musicians and bands were influenced by him, such as Chang Chen-yue, Xu Wei, Liang Long, Pu Shu, Wowkie Zhang, Tang Dynasty, Black Panther, Wang Feng, Wang Leehom, Tan Weiwei, Liang Bo, Gao Xiaosong, Deserts Chang, Lin Sheng Xiang, Khalil Fong, Yaksa, Li Zhi, Tengger, Qiu Ye, Mao Amin, Gao Qi, Emil Chau, Again, Vajara, and Dantès Dailiang. Chinese newspaper National Business Daily reported that in numerous variety talent shows, contestants paying tribute by performing Cui Jian's songs has become a common occurrence. A 2018 Yangcheng Evening News survey showed that the song "Greenhouse Girl" alone, has been covered more than 20 times on TV shows since 2010, and has appeared in at least five blockbusters. The song "The Lost Season" inspired Ning Hao's film Guns and Roses.

A tribute album Who Is Cui Jian!? was released in 2005 by Scream Records, featuring 11 bands covering Cui's songs. Jon Campbell from South China Morning Post reviewed that the album "leaving much mediocrity", although he thought Reflector's pop-punk take on "Rock 'N' Roll on the New Long March" and Pao Pao Tang's reinvention of "Piece of Red Cloth" are highlights.

=== Archives and recognition ===
Cui ranked 51rd on Forbes China Celebrity 100 list in 2004. He graced the cover of the first Chinese edition of Rolling Stone in March 2006. In 2007, Cui was included in the China Power List by openDemocracy and Chatham House. In 2009, in an online poll by China Internet Information Center, Cui ranked as the 6th most influential singer in China since 1949 and the 12th most influential celebrity overall, with 160,000 votes. The Chinese edition of L'Officiel Hommes listed him as one of the fashion legends since the founding of the People's Republic of China. In September, he ranked fifth in the 1990s category of Sohu's idol vote across decades. In a 2010 survey of Chinese university students, Cui ranked second among the symbolic figures in the Chinese entertainment world. A wax figure of Cui has been unveiled at Madame Tussauds Beijing in May 2013. In the same year, according to a market survey by Xi'an Concert Hall, 60-70% of middle-class and above males had varying degrees of affinity to him. Arts Council Korea described Cui as "the best rock singer in China". A booklet of the Arezzo Wave calls him "protagonist of the Chinese pop-rock scene". He has been recognized by the media outlet Cultural Tourism China under China's Ministry of Culture and Tourism as "a musical genius born for Chinese rock and roll, the founder of Chinese rock, and a pioneer and thinker of China's new music".

== Discography ==
- Returning Wanderer (1984)
- Rock 'n' Roll on the New Long March (1989)
- Solution (1991)
- Balls Under the Red Flag (1994)
- The Power of the Powerless (1998)
- Show You Colour (2005)
- Frozen Light (2015)
- A Flying Dog (2021)

== Filmography ==
- 1993 – Beijing Bastards (北京杂种; Beijing Zazhong), directed by Zhang Yuan, as himself
- 2003 – Roots and Branches (我的兄弟姐妹; Wo de xiongdi jiemei), directed by Yu Chung, as the father/music teacher
- 2007 – The Sun Also Rises (太阳照常升起; Taiyang zhaochang shengqi), directed by Jiang Wen, as Tang's friend in Beijing
- 2012 – Transcendence 3-D concert, directed by Bai Qiang
- 2013 – Promise, directed and written by himself
- 2013 – Blue Sky Bones

== Books ==
- Cui Jian; Zhou Guoping (October 2001). 自由风格 [Free Style]. Guangxi Normal University Press. ISBN 9787563331079.
- Cui Jian (15 November 2017). Never Turning Back. International Poetry Nights in Hong Kong Series. Hong Kong: Chinese University of Hong Kong Press. ISBN 9789882370357.
- Cui Jian (1 July 2022). 崔健诗歌集: 1986-2021 [Poetry Collection of Cui Jian: 1986-2021]. Contemporary World Press. ISBN 9787509016565.

== Tours ==
- Rock 'N' Roll on the New Long March Tour (1990; 1991-1992)
- 1995 US tour (1995)
- 1999 US tour (1999)
- 2001 European tour (2001)
- Live Vocals Movement Tour (2002–2005)
- 2004 North American tour (2004)
- 2009 Concert Tour (2009)
- The Blue Bones Tour (2012–2015)
- Rolling 30 Tour (2016–2018)
- 2019 Australian tour (2019)
- A Flying Dog Tour (2021–2023)
- Keep Going Wild Tour (2024–2025)
