= A Flying Dog =

Studio album by Cui Jian
- Released: August 27, 2021
- Genres: Art rock; blues rock; rap rock; alternative rock
- Label: Lvdong

Cui Jian chronology
Frozen Light (2015)	A Flying Dog (2021)

A Flying Dog (Chinese: 飞狗; pinyin: fēi gǒu) is a 2021 Mandarin rock album by Cui Jian. The album is the shortest one in duration among Cui's albums. Cui won the Best Mandarin Male Singer Award at the 33rd Golden Melody Awards for the album, making him the first mainland Chinese musician to receive this honor.

It was also listed among the Top 20 Albums of the Year by Asian Pop Music Awards and included the album in Southern Metropolis Daily's top 10 albums of 2021. The single "The B-Side of Time" became the highest-scoring rock song of the year on the 2021 TME Chart.

== Track listing ==
Standard listing
No.	Title	Translation	Length
1.	"飞狗"	"A Flying Dog"	3:47
2.	"时间的B面"	"The B-Side Of Time"	4:41
3.	"留守者"	"Staying Behind"	3:34
4.	"末日海滩"	"Armageddon Beach"	5:22
5.	"爱情量子定律"	"Quantum Of Love"	4:22
6.	"兔子牛"	"Rabbit Bull"	3:54
7.	"半边儿天"	"Half The Sky"	4:59
8.	"继续"	"Go On"	6:11
