= Frozen Light =

Studio album by Cui Jian
- Released: December 25, 2015
- Genre: Art rock; folk rock; alternative rock
- Label: Sony Music

Cui Jian chronology
Show You Colour (2005)	Frozen Light (2015)	A Flying Dog (2021)

Frozen Light (Chinese: 光冻; pinyin: guāng dòng) is a 2015 Mandarin rock album by Cui Jian. It won the Best Vocal Recording Album at the 27th Golden Melody Awards.

== Track listing ==
Standard listing
No.	Title	Translation	Length
1.	"光冻"	"Frozen Light"	7:39
2.	"死不回头"	"No Turning Back"	4:09
3.	"鱼鸟之恋"	"Birdfish"	6:19
4.	"外面的妞"	"Outside Girl"	8:03
5.	"酷瓜树"	"Cool Melon Tree"	5:21
6.	"金色早晨"	"Golden Morning"	5:08
7.	"滚动的蛋"	"Rolling"	7:35
8.	"浑水湖漫步"	"Walking By Muddy Lake"	4:31
9.	"阳光下的梦"	"Under Sun Dreaming"	4:53
