= Balls Under the Red Flag =

Studio album by Cui Jian
- Released: 1994
- Genre: Art rock • new wave • folk rock • alternative rock • funk rock • rap rock • progressive rock • jazz rock
- Label: Eastworld (Japan) •深圳市先科娛樂傳播有限公司 (China) • JingWen (China)

Cui Jian chronology
Solution (1991)	Balls Under the Red Flag (1994)	The Power of the Powerless (1998)

Hongqi xia de dan (红旗下的蛋 literally "eggs" under the red flag), English title on CD cover Balls Under The Red Flag, is a 1994 Mandarin rock album by Cui Jian.

== Track listing ==
Standard listing
No.	Title	Unofficial translation	Length
1.	"Fēile 飛了"	"Flying"	5:33
2.	"Kuānróng 寬容"	"Tolerate"	8:07
3.	"Hóngqí xià de dàn 紅旗下的蛋"	"Balls Under the Red Flag"	7:57
4.	"Běijīng de gùshì 北京的故事"	"Beijing Story"	7:46
5.	"Hézi 盒子"	"The Box"	7:40
6.	"Zuì hòu de bàoyuàn 最後的抱怨"	"The Last Complaint"	8:00
7.	"Wùhuì 誤會"	"Misunderstand"	7:08
8.	"Bǐ'àn 彼岸"	"The Other Shore"	5:22
