= The Power of the Powerless (album) =

Studio album by Cui Jian
- Released: 1998
- Genre: Art rock • rap rock • folk rock • alternative rock
- Label: China Record Corp (China) • JingWen (China) • World Beat (North América)

Cui Jian chronology
Balls Under the Red Flag (1994)	The Power of the Powerless (1998)	Show You Colour (2005)

Wuneng de liliang (无能的力量), English title on CD cover The Power of the Powerless, is a 1998 Mandarin rock album by Cui Jian. The title derives from the 1978 essay The Power of the Powerless by Václav Havel but the album does not specifically reference this connection.

== Track listing ==
Standard listing
No.	Title	Unofficial translation	Length
1.	"Hùn zi 混子"	"Slackers"	5:46
2.	"Wúnéng de lìliàng 无能的力量"	"The Power of the Powerless"	4:21
3.	"Jiǔshí niándài 九十年代"	"The 90's"	5:39
4.	"Lóngzhōngniǎo er 笼中鸟儿"	"Caged Bird"	5:18
5.	"Huǎnchōng 缓冲"	"Buffer"	5:34
6.	"Xīnxiān yáogǔn Rock'n Roll 新鲜摇滚 Rock'n Roll"	"Fresh Flesh Rock'n Roll"	5:37
7.	"Lìng yīgè kōngjiān 另一个空间"	"Another Space"	8:15
8.	"Chūnjié 春节"	"Spring Festival"	5:07
9.	"Shídài de wǎnshàng 时代的晚上"	"Night of the Times"	5:07
