= Vajara =

Tibetan rock and roll band

Vajara (Tibetan: གནམ་ལྕགས་, Wylie: gnam lcags; Chinese: 天杵; pinyin: Tiān Chǔ; lit. 'Heaven Pestle') is Tibet's oldest and most famous rock and roll band. Founded in 1999 by six Tibetan people, the band creates modern music with elements from Tibetan opera, blues, and rap. Tenzin Dawa, the band's founder, was influenced by both Chinese rock acts such as Cui Jian and American rock bands like Nirvana but desired to forge a style separate from either genre. Vajara's songs are sung in both Tibetan and Chinese, with lyrical themes that address social issues such as greed and environmentalism. The band's main performing venue is a musical bar in Tibet's provincial capital of Lhasa.

== Style ==
Vajara's musical style originates from the popular practices of young people on the Qinghai-Tibet Plateau. Vajara's founder and drummer, Tenzin Dawa (Bstan a'dzin Zla ba), was influenced by the music of Cui Jian, U2, Nirvana, and Metallica. Many Vajara songs incorporate elements from Tibetan folk music, including Tibetan opera, including heavy bass lines and throat singing. Lyrically, Vajara's originally-written songs covers themes of environmental protection, animal rights, and opposition to materialism. The band's intent, according to its founder, is to spread awareness not only about issues relevant to the Tibetan ethnic group, but also about issues common to humanity in general.

== Members ==
Vajara was founded by six young Tibetan people in 1999, all of whom were born in the 1970s. Dawa began his musical career while studying at Beijing's Minzu University of China in the early 1990s, where he sought a style separate from American rock and the rock music of Han Chinese people.

== History ==
Chinese rock became popular in eastern mainland China in the 1990s, but rock took an additional decade to become rooted in western China's Tibet region because of conservative resistance from elders. Vajara was founded in 1999 as the oldest rock band in Tibet and remains the most famous rock band in Tibet. In 2003, Vajara's first album, "Tian Chu", won the "Tibet Music The Most Percussive Award". In October 2005, they appeared at the sixth Beijing Midi Music Festival on October 3, 2005, in Haidan Park. When the Snow Pile White bar opened in Lhasa as the only music bar in the city in August 2005, they became the main venue for Vajara's performances. In 2006, Vajara was profiled by the China Internet Information Center as one of the six foremost bands in the Lhasa music scene, which also includes the fellow rock band Antelope Horns (Pilgrims), the country band Friends, the folk band Nine-Eyed Stones, and the pop groups Tibetan Mastiffs and Hada.

In March 2008, Vajara signed a recording contract with Modernsky Entertainment (摩登天空, Módēng Tiānkōng), coinciding with the release of its second album, "Tianchu 2". Tianchu 2 contains elements of blues and rap, and is sung in both the Tibetan and Chinese languages. In 2009, Vajara was mentioned in the national People's Daily as an example of the cultural output of young Tibetans who are proficient in both Tibetan and Chinese, who since the release of the Sister Drum album in 1999 have capitalized on the popularity of Tibetan folk traditions within China as a whole. Other artists mentioned as Vajara's contemporaries include the Tibetan poets Alai, Tashi Dawa, and Yindaicai.
