= Zhou Guoping =

Chinese philosopher

Zhou Guoping 周国平
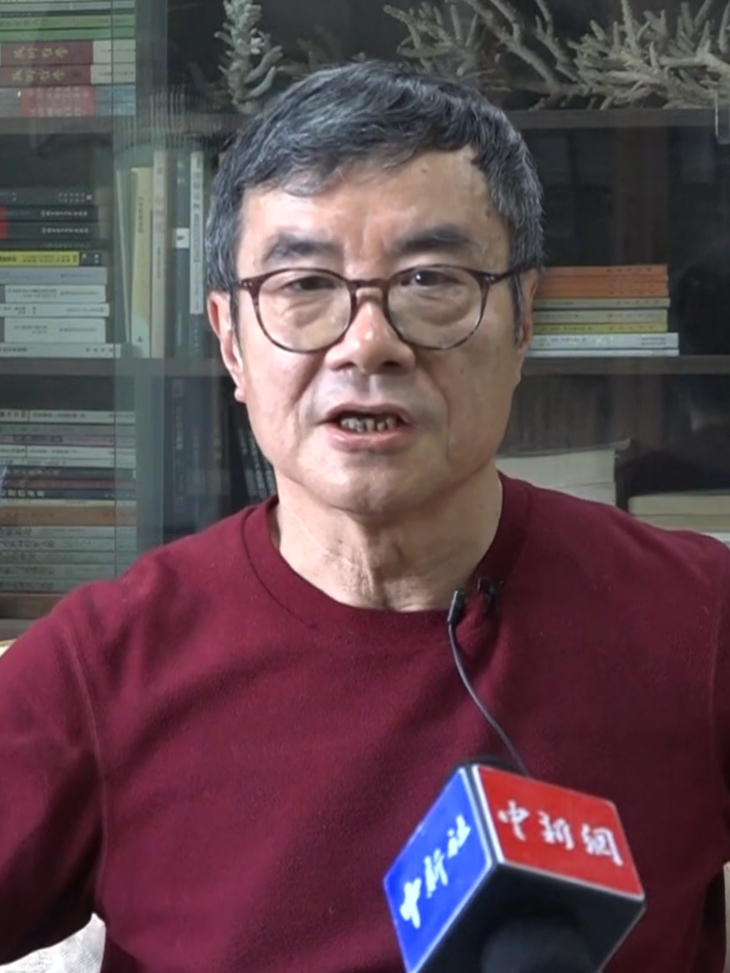
- Zhou in 2019
- Born: July 25, 1945 (age 80)
- Education: Peking University Graduate School of Chinese Academy of Social Sciences
- Occupation: • Writer • Scholar • Philosopher
- Spouse: Minzi (?-1980) Xiang Lingyu (divorced) Guo Hong (1997-present)
- Children: Niuniu (deceased) Jiujiu

Zhou Guoping (Chinese: 周国平; pinyin: Zhōu Guópíng; born July 25, 1945) is a modern Chinese author, poet, scholar, translator, philosopher, and research fellow at the Institute of Philosophy of the Chinese Academy of Social Sciences.

As of 2017, Zhou had published more than 20 books, some in Japan, Taiwan, Hong Kong and Korea.

== Biography ==
Zhou was born in Shanghai, where he grew up and attended Shanghai High School. After he graduated from Peking University in 1967, Zhou worked on a Hunan farm for one and a half years. He was later relocated to work in the Tzeyuan town in Guangxi, where he married his first wife, Minzi (Chinese: 敏子).

In 1978, he left Guangxi and attended the Institute of Philosophy of Chinese Academy of Social Sciences, where he received a masters degree and a PhD.

In the spring of 1980 Zhou's first marriage ended. He then married Xiang Lingyu (Chinese: 项灵羽). When Zhou was 43, he had his first daughter Niuniu (Chinese: 妞妞), who was diagnosed with and died from a rare cancer, Retinoblastoma. His second marriage ended soon after Niuniu's death.

In September 1997, Zhou married Guo Hong (Chinese: 郭红), who was twenty years younger than him. Together they had a daughter, Jiujiu (Chinese: 啾啾).

Zhou caused controversy in 2015 by a Weibo post which said that women were beautiful when cleaning the house or feeding babies, which led to him being accused of having straight man cancer.

== Selected publications ==
- Niuniu: the Reading Notes of a Father (Shanghai People's Publishing House, 2006) was written after the death of Niuniu (Zhou's first daughter) from retinoblastoma.
- Men and Eternity (Shanghai People's Publishing House, 1987) is a book of short essays.
- The Starry Sky of Thoughts (People's Literature Publishing House, 2009) is a book of essays.
- Souls Only Walk Alone (People's Literature Publishing House, 2009)
- Freestyle (People's Literature Publishing House, 2001) is a book of dialogues between Zhou and rock musician Cui Jian.

== Controversy ==
In the Starry Sky of Thoughts, Zhou states that from his viewpoint, the beauty of a woman will inevitably be compromised if she fails to become a good lover, wife, and mother. His words lead to criticisms from numerous feminists. Lu Ping (Chinese: 吕频), a feminist activist, argued that Zhou’s words were "not only ignorant about women, but also contained an arrogant attitude from his ivory tower.”
