= Straight man cancer =

Straight man cancer (Chinese: 直男癌; pinyin: zhí nán ái) is a derogatory neologism used by Chinese feminists to describe men who are stubbornly supportive of traditional gender roles and therefore considered sexist and chauvinistic. Coined by the users of Chinese social networks Douban and Weibo in mid-2014, it refers to conservative men who unapologetically uphold traditional patriarchical values and belittle women's movement and gender equality, and are usually nationalistic and variably hostile to foreigners and ethnic minorities.

The term originated from mainland China. It became popular in 2015 when scholar Zhou Guoping was accused of having the syndrome after a Weibo post. However in recent years, the use of the term has been accused of misandry and is met with significant backlash on social media with counter-insults like "feminist cancer" (Chinese: 女权癌, the Chinese equivalent of "feminazi") or "feminist whore" (Chinese: 女权婊, implying Chinese feminists tend to only criticize Chinese men harshly but behave rather warmly towards foreign men). The Chinese feminist movement is also vilified as "field feminism" (Chinese: 田园女权, a portmanteau of "field dog" 田园犬 and "feminism") to denigrate feminists as barking extremists.

== Causes ==
=== Historical self-sufficiency ===
The self-sufficient economy (also called small-scale peasant economy), a basic socio-economic formation in Chinese feudal society, has lasted for more than 2000 years in ancient China. It did not require any aid, support, or interaction, for survival; therefore it is a type of personal or collective autonomy, which contributes to the formation of the idea of male supremacy.

Since men have advantages in physical strength, some occupy positions in the main production sectors and some women are relegated to a secondary position in production.

=== Preference for sons ===
Numerous Chinese families which still have been influenced a lot by the patriarchal tradition, especially the rural families, tend to have a preference for boys rather than girls.

== See also ==
- Patriarchy
- Male chauvinism
- Female chauvinism
- Feminism
