= Solution (Cui Jian album) =

Studio album by Cui Jian
- Released: 1991
- Genre: Art rock • rap rock • folk rock

Cui Jian chronology
Rock 'n' Roll on the New Long March (1989)	Solution (1991)	Balls Under the Red Flag (1994)

Jiejue (解决 Solution), also featuring the English name Solution on the album cover, is a 1991 Mandarin rock album by Cui Jian. It was his second commercially available album after Rock 'n' Roll on the New Long March (1989), and he was able to have it released in China after adapting some of the lyrics.

It features "A Piece of Red Cloth", which Cui always blindfolded with a piece of red cloth when performing this song. The lyrics express Cui's dissatisfaction with being controlled by the country, but he will not leave or escape because he knows "how much pain the country has suffered".

== Track listing ==
1. 解决 (Solution)
2. 这儿的空间 (This Space)
3. 一块红布 (Piece of Red Cloth)
4. 寂寞就像一团烈火 (Lonely Like A Fire)
5. 投机份子 (The Opportunist)
6. 快让我在这雪地上撒点儿野 (Wild on the Snow)
7. 像一把刀子 (Like A Knife)
8. 南泥湾 (Nanniwan)
9. 从头再来 (Start Over)
10. 最后一枪 (Last Shot)
