= Blue Sky Bones =

- Directed by: Cui Jian
- Production companies: Antaeus Film Group; Beijing Dongxi Music Art Production Co., Ltd; Liaoning Ougu Digital Technology Co., Ltd; Shenzhenshi Zhongshu Wenchuang Capital Management Co., Ltd; Dongyue International Media（Beijing）Co., Ltd; Defang Wealth management（Dalian）Co., Ltd
- Release dates: November 13, 2013 (Rome); October 17, 2014 (China)
- Running time: 100 minutes
- Country: China
- Language: Mandarin
- Box office: ¥3.02 million (China)

Blue Sky Bones (Chinese: 蓝色骨头), also known as The Blue Bone, is a 2013 Chinese music film directed by Cui Jian. It was released in China on October 17, 2014.

== Cast ==
- Zhao Youliang
- Ni Hongjie
- Yin Fang
- Huang Xuan
- Huang Huan
- Guo Jinglin
- Lei Han
- Tao Ye
- Mao Amin

== Reception ==
By October 20, the film had earned ¥3.02 million at the Chinese box office.
