= Show You Colour =

Studio album by Cui Jian
- Released: 23 March 2005
- Genre: Art rock; rap rock; experimental hip hop; industrial hip hop; folk rock
- Label: JingWen Records

Cui Jian chronology
The Power of the Powerless (1998)	Show You Colour (2005)	Frozen Light (2015)

Show You Colour (Chinese: 给你一点颜色; pinyin: Gěinǐ Yīdiǎn Yánsè; lit. 'Give You a Little Colour') is the fifth studio album by Chinese rock musician Cui Jian, released on 23 March 2005.

== Track listing ==
1. 城市船夫; Chéngshì Chuánfū; 'City Boatman'
2. 蓝色骨头; Lánsè Gǔtou; 'Blue Bone'
3. 迷失的季节; Míshī de Jìjié; 'The Lost Season'
4. 小城故事V21(上); Xiǎochéng Gùshì V21 (Shàng); 'Little Town Story V21-(A)'
5. 红先生; Hóng Xiānshēng; 'Mr. Red'
6. 网络处男; Wǎngluò Chǔnán; 'Internet Virgin'
7. 小城故事V21(中); Xiǎochéng Gùshì V21 (Zhōng); 'Little Town Story V21-(B)'
8. 农村包围城市; Nóngcūn Bāowéi Chéngshì; 'Village Attacks City'
9. 小城故事V21(下); Xiǎochéng Gùshì V21( Xià); 'Little Town Story V21-(C)'
10. 舞过38线; Wǔguò 38 Xiàn; 'Dance Across 38 Parraler'
11. 超越那一天; Chāoyuè Nà Yītiān; 'Get Over That Day'
