= Transcendence (2012 film) =

- 超越那一天
- Directed by: Bai Qiang
- Produced by: Bai Qiang
- Starring: Cui Jian
- Release date: 2012
- Country: China
- Language: Mandarin

Transcendence (超越那一天 chāoyuè nà yītiān) is a 2012 3D concert film and documentary on the "Father of Chinese Rock" Cui Jian. Produced and directed by Bai Qiang. Cui Jian was persuaded to allow 3D filming of the concert after seeing U2's 3D concert.

The film was screened in Beijing in May 2012 to a limited audience, and expected to release September 2012, but was not fully commercially released until May 3, 2013.
