= Zi Yue (band) =

Chinese rock band

The first album (The black nose and mouth represent the characters Zi Yue, the writing behind "Kong Says")

Zi Yue (子曰乐队) or Yaoshi Ziyue (爻釋・子曰) are a Chinese rock band formed in Beijing in 1994. The name "Zi yue" literally means "Confucius Says...," but the band has occasionally also used the English name You.Me.It.. The founder and lead singer is Qiu Ye (秋野).

Zi Yue's first album was praised as the best Chinese album of 1997 by China Broadway (Zhongguo Bailaohu), which is one of China's leading music magazines. Rock critic Shang Guan wrote: "Just when we are lamenting the decline of Chinese rock and roll, Zi Yue brings us this delightful album. It is not only a pleasant surprise, but also a comfort — a comfort to all the hearts which have cooled down for such a long time.."

== Albums ==
- Yáoshì zǐyuē (爻釈・子曰) Daheng Electronic Publishing, 1997, August 2000 CD
- Fènfēi zài nǔlì (奮飛再努力) Shuhe Langqiao Cultural Broadcasting, November 2002 CD
- Vol.2 (第二册) Tianjin Music Co., Beijing Capital Cultural Records, July 2002 ISRC CN-C09-02-310-00/A.J6 cassette and CD
