= Beijing Star Daily =

Chinese entertainment newspaper

- Type: Daily newspaper
- Owner(s): Beijing Daily Newspaper Group
- Founded: 4 January 1981
- Language: Chinese
- Ceased publication: 1 January 2018
- OCLC number: 49555492
- Website: www.stardaily.com.cn

Beijing Star Daily
- Traditional Chinese: 北京娛樂信報
- Simplified Chinese: 北京娱乐信报
- Literal meaning: Beijing Entertainment Post
Transcriptions
Standard Mandarin
- Hanyu Pinyin: Běijīng yúlè xìnbào

The Beijing Star Daily or Beijing Entertainment Post (simplified Chinese: 北京娱乐信报; traditional Chinese: 北京娛樂信報; pinyin: Běijīng yúlè xìnbào), also known as Beijing Daily Messenger or Beijing Entertainment Newspaper, was a comprehensive entertainment newspaper published in Beijing.

Beijing Star Daily was formerly known as Drama and Film Post (戏剧电影报), which was founded by the Beijing Federation of Literary and Art Circles (北京市文学艺术联合会) on 4 January 1981. On 1 January 2018, the paper officially ceased publication.

== History ==
Beijing Star Daily was renamed from Drama and Film Post, which was launched on 4 January 1981.

On 9 October 2000, the Drama and Film Post officially changed its name to Beijing Star Daily. In November 2004, it was taken over by the Beijing Daily Newspaper Group (北京日报报业集团).

The rise of digital media and shifting reader preferences dealt a severe blow to traditional print media. The Beijing Star Daily attempted to adapt by launching a website and mobile app, but these efforts failed to offset declining circulation and revenue. Intense competition from other major dailies, such as The Beijing News and Jinghua Times, which also expanded into entertainment reporting, further eroded its market share. On 27 November 2007, the newspaper was transformed into a metro newspaper, which was distributed free of charge in Beijing's subway stations.

The paper's reliance on sensationalist content, including celebrity scandals and gossip, attracted readers but drew criticism for lacking depth and journalistic integrity. As readers sought more substantive reporting, the paper struggled to adapt its content strategy. Additionally, declining advertising revenue and rising operational costs exacerbated financial difficulties.

On 1 January 2018, the Beijing Star Daily officially ceased publication.
