= Spring and Autumn brushwork =

Writing technique

The term "Spring and Autumn brushwork" (春秋笔法), also known as "Spring and Autumn writing style" or "subtle and significant meanings," refers to a writing technique where the author subtly expresses their subjective views through detailed descriptions, rhetorical methods (such as word choice), and selective presentation of materials, without directly stating their opinions on people and events. Originally, it meant that later generations would rigorously examine the actions of previous people to determine who was extremely evil and who respected the current dynasty, embodying the idea that "good and evil will be proven by history" . Nowadays, the term "Spring and Autumn brushwork" denotes a writing style that is indirect yet conveys praise or criticism.

Around 480 BCE, Confucius compiled the " Spring and Autumn Annals " (though some believe it was not authored by Confucius). When recording history, Confucius subtly expressed approval or disapproval. Later, commentators wrote the "Three Commentaries on the Spring and Autumn Annals" ("Zuo Zhuan," "Gongyang Zhuan," and "Guliang Zhuan"), which interpreted the events documented in the "Spring and Autumn Annals" (originally just a chronological record), adding strict criticisms to judge the correctness of actions and determine good and evil .Authors dedicated works to elucidate Confucius' thoughts, especially concerning details of ritual in the "Spring and Autumn Annals." Thus, when Mencius said, "Confucius completed the Spring and Autumn Annals, causing treacherous ministers and villains to fear," the term "Spring and Autumn brushwork" began to imply the notion of later generations rigorously determining who was extremely evil or who respected the court .This approach, known as "subtle and significant meanings" or "Spring and Autumn brushwork," was praised in ancient Chinese tradition.

The "New Book of Tang" and the "Historical Records of the Five Dynasties" organized and edited by Ouyang Xiu during the Song dynasty, extensively employed the "Spring and Autumn brushwork" style. Qian Daxin said, "The Spring and Autumn Annals is a book of praise and blame," while Zhu Xi believed that the "Spring and Autumn Annals" did not contain such praise or blame . For example, during the internal conflict in the state of Zheng in the Spring and Autumn period, known as the rebellion of Gongshu Duan, Confucius satirized the behavior of Zheng Zhuanggong and his brother Gongshu Duan ("Zheng Bo defeated Duan at Yan"), but he praised Ying Kao Shu.

== Example ==
A well-known example of the use of "Spring and Autumn brushwork" is the nuanced connotations embedded in single characters to imply praise or criticism. For instance, the three verbs indicating "to kill"—杀 (sha), 弑 (shi), and 诛 (zhu)—each carry deeper meanings. "杀" (sha) implies killing someone innocent, "弑" (shi) denotes regicide or a subordinate killing a superior, and "诛" (zhu) signifies killing someone guilty and with justification.

In the "Mencius," Chapter 8 of "Liang Hui Wang II," King Xuan of Qi asks about King Wu of Zhou's campaign against King Zhou of Shang: "Is it permissible for a minister to kill his sovereign?" Here, King Xuan refers to King Wu's rebellion and the subsequent killing of King Zhou. Mencius responds, "A wicked man who harms humanity is merely a solitary individual. I have heard of punishing a criminal named Zhou, but I have not heard of regicide." This implies that King Zhou's actions made him unworthy of being considered a legitimate sovereign, thus justifying King Wu's actions as "诛" (punishing a guilty man) rather than "弑" (regicide).

== See also ==
- Emotive language changes
- "Zuo Zhuan" (The Commentary of Zuo)
- "Gongyang Zhuan" (The Commentary of Gongyang)
- "Guliang Zhuan" (The Commentary of Guliang)
- Historical revisionism
- Official history
- Recorded history
