= List of awards and nominations received by Cui Jian =

Cui Jian awards and nominations
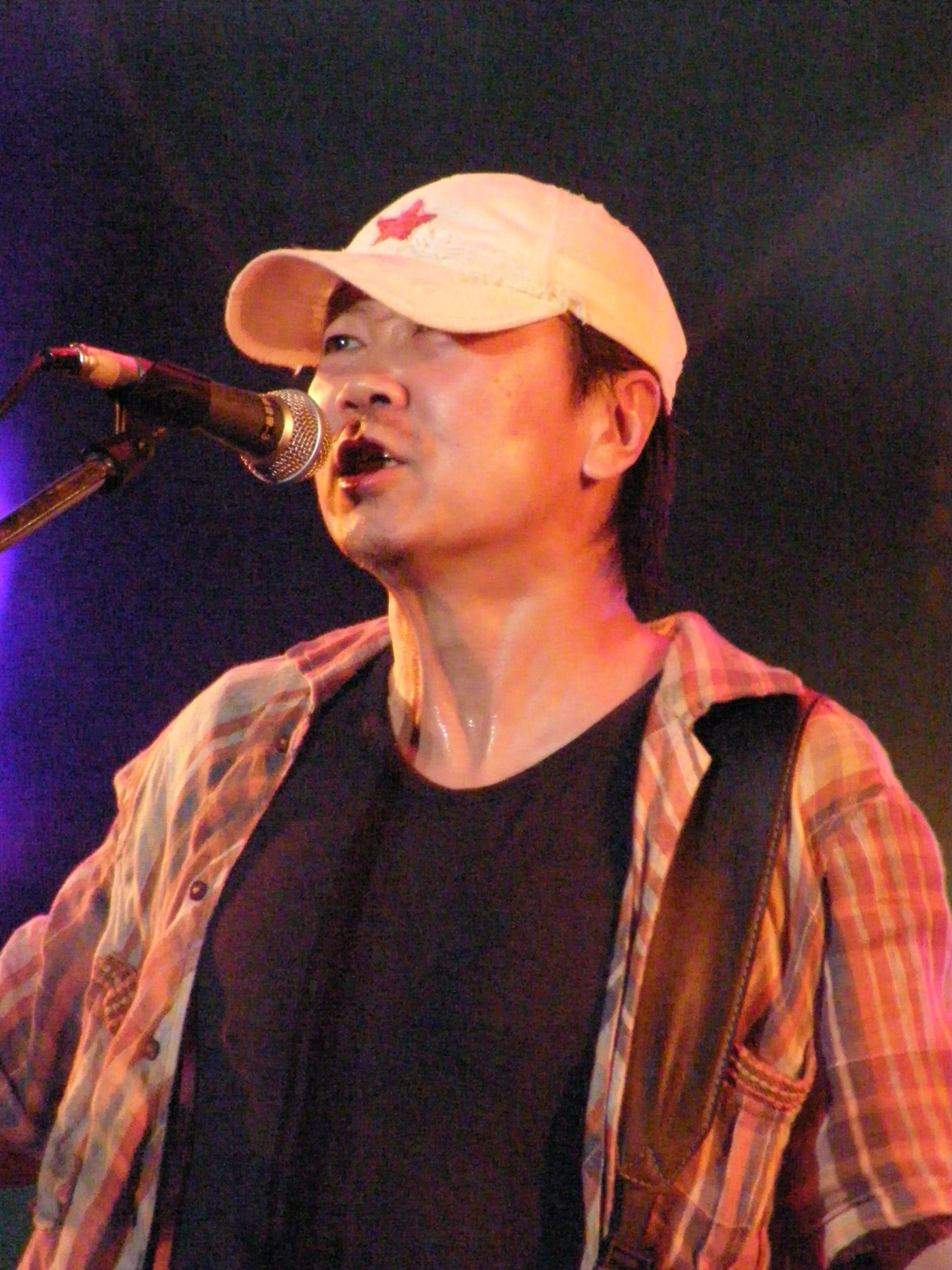
- Cui in 2007
Awards and nominations
| Award | Wins | Nominations |
| MTV VMA | 1 | 1 |
| GMA | 2 | 5 |
| Jade Solid Gold Awards | 0 | 2 |
| Top Ten Chinese Gold Songs Award | 1 | 2 |
| Top Chinese Music Awards | 4 | 7 |
| Chinese Music Awards | 11 | 22 |
| Asian Pop Music Awards | 1 | 2 |
| CMIC Music Awards | 0 | 1 |
| QQ Music Awards | 2 | 2 |
| Tenco Prize | 1 | 1 |
| SFIFF | 1 | 1 |
| Rome Film Festival | 1 | 2 |
| JIMFF | 1 | 1 |
| SIFF | 0 | 1 |
| Asian Film Awards | 0 | 1 |
| Prince Claus Award | 1 | 1 |

Totals (Note: Certain award groups do not simply award one winner. They acknowledge several different recipients, have runners-up, and have third place. Since this is a specific recognition and is different from losing an award, runner-up mentions are considered wins in this award tally. For simplification and to avoid errors, each award in this list has been presumed to have had a prior nomination.)
- Wins: 73
- Nominations: 110

This is the list of awards and nominations received by Chinese singer-songwriter Cui Jian.

== Awards and nominations ==
| Award/organization | Year | Nominee | Category | Result | Ref. |
|---|---|---|---|---|---|
| Ministry of Culture | 1988 | "Nothing to My Name" | Top Ten Golden Song Award of the Reform Age | Honoree | |
| China International Culture Exchange Center | 1989 | Cui Jian | Outstanding Singer Award | Won | |
| National Radio and Television Administration, Ministry of Culture, Central Committee of the Communist Youth League | 1990 | Cui Jian | All-China Teen Choice Award | Won | |
| RTHK Top Ten Chinese Gold Songs Award | 1989 | "Nothing to My Name" | Outstanding Mandarin Song Award | Won | |
| RTHK Top Ten Chinese Gold Songs Award | 1989 | Cui Jian | Best New Prospect Award | Nominated | |
| MTV Video Music Awards | 1991 | "Wild on the Snow" | International Viewer's Choice Award for MTV Asia | Won | |
| Jade Solid Gold Awards | 1992 | "Piece of Red Cloth" | Most Popular Mandarin Song Award | Nominated | |
| Jade Solid Gold Awards | 1992 | "Wild on the Snow" | Most Popular Mandarin Song Award | Nominated | |
| San Francisco International Film Festival | 1992 | "Piece of Red Cloth" | Golden Gate Awards Special Mention | Won | |
| YMC Supreme Chart Grand Election's China Recommendation Chart | 1997 | Cui Jian | Supreme Male Singer | Won | |
| Prince Claus Fund | 2000 | Cui Jian | Prince Claus Award | Won | |
| Intel | 2001 | Cui Jian | Creative Special Achievement Award | Won | |
| China Light Music Association | 2003 | Cui Jian | Rock Music Contribution Award | Won | |
| United Nations | 2004 | Cui Jian | World Peace Music Award | Won | |
| The Sound of Asia – The Cultural Festival of Science and Technology in Sound Recording | 2004 | "Little Town Story" | Best Rock Music Recording Award | Won | |
| The Sound of Asia – The Cultural Festival of Science and Technology in Sound Recording | 2006 | Cui Jian | Top Ten Tech Raider | Honoree | |
| The Sound of Asia – The Cultural Festival of Science and Technology in Sound Recording | 2006 | "City Boatman" | Outstanding Vocal Work Recording Award | Won | |
| TOM Online "Internet·Entertainment·Heroes" Awarding Ceremony | 2006 | Cui Jian | Most Qualified Singer for Concert | Won | |
| TOM Online "Internet·Entertainment·Heroes" Awarding Ceremony | 2006 | Cui Jian | Mainland Strength Male Singer of the Most Popular Singers | Won | |
| Entertainment Decade Celebration | 2006 | Cui Jian | Chinese Music (Rock) Ten Year Outstanding Contribution Award | Won | |
| Oriental Morning Post "Cultural China" Person of the Year Award | 2007 | Cui Jian | Special Award for Music and Culture | Won | |
| Jeep Ceremony | 2009 | Cui Jian | Jeep Pioneer Award | Won | |
| GQ Chinese | 2014 | Cui Jian | Annual Person of Culture | Won | |
| Hong Kong Dance Alliance | 2002 | Show You Colour | Hong Kong Dance Alliance Dance Awards | Honoree | |
| Performing Arts | 2002 | Cui Jian | Best Movement Organizer | Won | |
| Chinese Music Media Awards | 2002 | Cui Jian | Lifetime Achievement Award | Won | |
| Chinese Music Media Awards | 2006 | Cui Jian | Hall of Fame Musician | Won | |
| Chinese Music Media Awards | 2006 | Show You Colour | Best Rock Artist | Nominated | |
| Chinese Music Media Awards | 2006 | Show You Colour | Best Mandarin Male Artist | Nominated | |
| Chinese Music Media Awards | 2006 | Show You Colour | Annual Mandarin Album | Nominated | |
| Chinese Music Media Awards | 2006 | Show You Colour | Annual Artist | Nominated | |
| Chinese Music Media Awards | 2011 | Cui Jian | Best Live Artist | Won | |
| Chinese Music Media Awards | 2017 | Frozen Light | Annual Mandarin Album | Won | |
| Chinese Music Media Awards | 2017 | Frozen Light | Best Mandarin Male Artist | Won | |
| Chinese Music Media Awards | 2017 | Frozen Light | Best Rock Artist | Won | |
| Chinese Music Media Awards | 2017 | Frozen Light | Best Recording Award | Won | |
| Top Chinese Music Awards | 2001 | Cui Jian | Music Industry Outstanding Contribution Award | Won | |
| Top Chinese Music Awards | 2006 | Show You Colour | Best Rock Singer | Won | |
| Top Chinese Music Awards | 2006 | Show You Colour | Best Rock Album | Nominated | |
| Top Chinese Music Awards | 2006 | "Blue Bone" | Best Rock Song | Nominated | |
| Top Chinese Music Awards | 2006 | "Mr. Red" | Best Rock Song | Nominated | |
| Top Chinese Music Awards | 2010 | Live Vocals Movement | Top Ten Music Events of the Decade | Honoree | |
| Top Chinese Music Awards | 2010 | Cui Jian | Most Influential Music Figures | Honoree | |
| Audi Arts Design Award | 2013 | Cui Jian | Outstanding Achievement Award | Won | |
| Premio Tenco | 2013 | Cui Jian | Tenco Cultural Operator Award | Won | |
| Sohu Fashion | 2014 | Cui Jian | Most Charming Man of the Year | Won | |
| Shishang xiansheng | 2014 | Cui Jian | Annual Mr. Fashionable | Honoree | |
| Human Rights Foundation | 2014 | Cui Jian | Outstanding Work in the Field of Human Rights | Nominated | |
| Tencent Academy Literature Award | 2015 | Cui Jian | Annual Tribute Lyricist | Won | |
| Vladivostok International Film Festival | 2006 | The Age of Repairing Virginity | Feature Film category | Nominated | |
| Vladivostok International Film Festival | 2006 | The Age of Repairing Virginity | Short Film category | Nominated | |
| Busan International 3D Film Festival | 2012 | Transcendence | Special Contribution Award | Won | |
| China 3D Industry Economic Annual Conference | 2013 | Transcendence | Best Live-Action 3D Film | Won | |
| Rome Film Festival | 2013 | Blue Sky Bones | Special Mention | Won | |
| Rome Film Festival | 2013 | Blue Sky Bones | Golden Marc'Aurelio Award | Nominated | |
| Jecheon International Music & Film Festival | 2014 | Blue Sky Bones | Special Jury Prize | Won | |
| Shanghai International Film Festival | 2014 | Blue Sky Bones | Asian New Talent Award Best Film | Nominated | |
| Spirit of Fire Film Festival | 2014 | Blue Sky Bones | Best Film | Copper | |
| China Film Director's Guild Awards | 2014 | Blue Sky Bones | Special Jury Award | Won | |
| Agnès Varda Award | 2014 | Blue Sky Bones | Special Attention Prize | Won | |
| Cinephilia Awards | 2015 | Blue Sky Bones | Special Mention Award | Won | |
| Cinephilia Awards | 2015 | Blue Sky Bones | Top Ten Films of the Year | Honoree | |
| Asian Film Awards | 2015 | Cui Jian, Liu Yuan | Best Composer | Nominated | |
| Chinese Film Media Awards | 2015 | Cui Jian | Best New Director | Won | |
| Golden Indie Music Awards | 2016 | Frozen Light | Best Asian Creative Artist Award | Nominated | |
| Golden Melody Awards | 2016 | Frozen Light | Best Vocal Recording Album | Won | |
| Golden Melody Awards | 2022 | A Flying Dog | Best Male Mandarin Singer | Won | |
| Golden Melody Awards | 2022 | A Flying Dog | Best Vocal Recording Album | Nominated | |
| Golden Melody Awards | 2022 | A Flying Dog | Best Mandarin Album | Nominated | |
| Golden Melody Awards | 2022 | A Flying Dog | Album of the Year | Nominated | |
| Chinese Music Awards | 2010 | Cui Jian | 30 Years 30 Artists | Honoree | |
| Chinese Music Awards | 2010 | Rock 'n' Roll on the New Long March | 30 Years 30 Albums | Honoree | |
| Chinese Music Awards | 2010 | "Nothing to My Name" | 30 Years 30 Songs | Honoree | |
| Chinese Music Awards | 2016 | Frozen Light | Best Arranger | Won | |
| Chinese Music Awards | 2016 | Frozen Light | Best Rock Artist | Won | |
| Chinese Music Awards | 2016 | Frozen Light | Best Mandarin Album | Won | |
| Chinese Music Awards | 2016 | Frozen Light | Best Recording | Won | |
| Chinese Music Awards | 2016 | Frozen Light | Top 10 Mandarin Albums | Honoree | |
| Chinese Music Awards | 2016 | Frozen Light | Best Mandarin Male Singer | Nominated | |
| Chinese Music Awards | 2016 | Frozen Light | Annual Artist | Nominated | |
| Chinese Music Awards | 2016 | Frozen Light | Grand Jury Prize | Nominated | |
| Chinese Music Awards | 2016 | Frozen Light | Best Producer | Nominated | |
| Chinese Music Awards | 2016 | Frozen Light | Best Music Video | Nominated | |
| Chinese Music Awards | 2016 | Frozen Light | Best Artist Selling | Nominated | |
| Chinese Music Awards | 2023 | A Flying Dog | Top 10 Mandarin Albums | Honoree | |
| Chinese Music Awards | 2023 | A Flying Dog | Best Mandarin Male Singer | Won | |
| Chinese Music Awards | 2023 | A Flying Dog | Best Rock Artist | Won | |
| Chinese Music Awards | 2023 | A Flying Dog | Best Singer-Songwriter | Nominated | |
| Chinese Music Awards | 2023 | A Flying Dog | Best Mandarin Album | Nominated | |
| Chinese Music Awards | 2023 | A Flying Dog | Grand Jury Prize | Nominated | |
| Chinese Music Awards | 2023 | "The B-Side of Time" | Best Lyricist | Nominated | |
| Chinese Music Awards | 2023 | "The B-Side of Time" | Best Arranger | Nominated | |
| QQ Music Awards | 2016 | Cui Jian | Best Mandarin Album (Mainland China) | Won | |
| QQ Music Awards | 2016 | Cui Jian | Outstanding Contribution Singer | Won | |
| Midi Awards | 2009 | Cui Jian | China Rock Contribution Award | Won | |
| Midi Awards | 2017 | Cui Jian | Best Rock Male Singer | Won | |
| Midi Awards | 2017 | Frozen Light | Album of the Year | Won | |
| Midi Awards | 2017 | "Rolling 30" Beijing Concert | Best Live Performance | Won | |
| Midi Awards | 2022 | A Flying Dog | Best Rock Album | Nominated | |
| Shanghai Press Publish Bureau | 2022 | Poetry Collection of Cui Jian: 1986-2021 | Most Beautiful Books | Honoree | |
| Freshmusic Awards | 2016 | Frozen Light | Top 10 Albums of the Year | Nominated | |
| Freshmusic Awards | 2022 | A Flying Dog | Top 10 Albums of the Year | Honoree | |
| Freshmusic Awards | 2022 | A Flying Dog | Best Male Singer | Nominated | |
| Freshmusic Awards | 2022 | A Flying Dog | Top 10 Singles of the Year | Nominated | |
| CMIC Music Awards | 2018 | Rock Symphony Live Concert | Best Rock Album | Nominated | |
| Asian Pop Music Awards | 2021 | Cui Jian | Best Producer | Nominated | |
| Asian Pop Music Awards | 2021 | A Flying Dog | Top 20 Albums of the Year | Honoree | |
| Music Business Industry Awards | 2024 | A Flying Dog | Original Music Ten Year Quality Album | Gold | |
| NetEase Cloud Music Indie Music Awards | 2024 | A Flying Dog | Top 50 Chinese original albums from 2020 to date | Silver | |
| Love Radio 103.7 | 2025 | "Rock 'n' Roll on the New Long March" | Love Radio Golden Hit Awards | Honoree | |

== Listicles ==
| Publisher | Year(s) | Nominee / work | Listicle | Ref. |
|---|---|---|---|---|
| Peking University Press | 1996 | "Nothing to My Name" | Masterpieces of Chinese Literature in the Past Hundred Years | |
| Peking University Press | 1996 | "This Space" | Masterpieces of Chinese Literature in the Past Hundred Years | |
| Nanyang Siang Pau | 2000 | Cui Jian | Top 100 Most Influential C-pop Artists in the 20th century | |
| Shopping Guide | 2000 | Solution | China's Top 10 Classic Rock Albums | |
| Shopping Guide | 2000 | Balls Under the Red Flag | China's Top 10 Classic Rock Albums | |
| Tianfu Morning Post | 2000 | "Nothing to My Name" | Top 10 Classics of Chinese Rock | |
| Tianfu Morning Post | 2000 | "Rock 'n' Roll on the New Long March" | Top 10 Classics of Chinese Rock | |
| Tianfu Morning Post | 2000 | "Balls Under the Red Flag" | Top 10 Classics of Chinese Rock | |
| Forbes | 2004 | Cui Jian | Forbes China Celebrity 100 | |
| Chinese edition of Madame Figaro | 2005 | Cui Jian | Top China Fashion Celebrities List | |
| openDemocracy, Chatham House | 2007 | Cui Jian | China Power List | |
| China Times Publishing, China Musicians Exchange Association | 2009 | Rock 'n' Roll on the New Long March | The 200 Best Taiwanese Popular Music Albums | |
| China Internet Information Center | 2009 | Cui Jian | Most influential cultural figure in China since 1949 | |
| Chinese edition of L'Officiel Hommes | 2009 | Cui Jian | 60 fashion legends since the founding of the People's Republic of China | |
| Southern Metropolis Daily | 2016 | Frozen Light | Top 10 Mandarin Albums of the Year | |
| Southern Metropolis Daily | 2022 | A Flying Dog | Top 10 Mandarin Albums of the Year | |
| TME Wave Chart | 2023 | Show You Colour | 200 Best Albums 2001～2020 | |
| TME Wave Chart | 2023 | Frozen Light | 200 Best Albums 2001～2020 | |
