= Morning Post (disambiguation) =

The Morning Post was a conservative daily newspaper published in London from 1772 to 1937.

Morning Post may also refer to:

- African Morning Post, a daily newspaper in Accra, Gold Coast
- Morning Post (Cairns), former name of The Cairns Post, a newspaper in Queensland, Australia
- Lebaudy Morning Post, a French semi-rigid airship manufactured by Lebaudy Frères

== Chinese newspapers ==
- Baise Morning Post, a Baise-based Chinese-language metropolitan newspaper
- Chongqing Morning Post, a Chinese-language newspaper
- Heilongjiang Morning Post, a Harbin-based Chinese-language daily newspaper
- Huangshan Morning Post, a Huangshan City-based Chinese-language morning newspaper
- Huashang Morning Post, a Shenyang-based simplified Chinese metropolitan newspaper
- Huasheng Morning Post, a Nanning-based Chinese morning newspaper
- Oriental Morning Post, a Shanghai-based Chinese-language morning newspaper
- Shanghai Morning Post, a Chinese-language tabloid newspaper
- South China Morning Post, a Hong Kong-based English-language newspaper
- Tianfu Morning Post, a Chengdu-based Chinese-language metropolitan newspaper
- Morning Post Weekly, a Chinese-language magazine published 2007–2018
- Independence Morning Post, a Chinese-language newspaper published in Taiwan alongside the Independence Evening Post from 1988 to 1999

== See also ==
- Correio da Manhã (disambiguation)
