= Cui Jian discography =

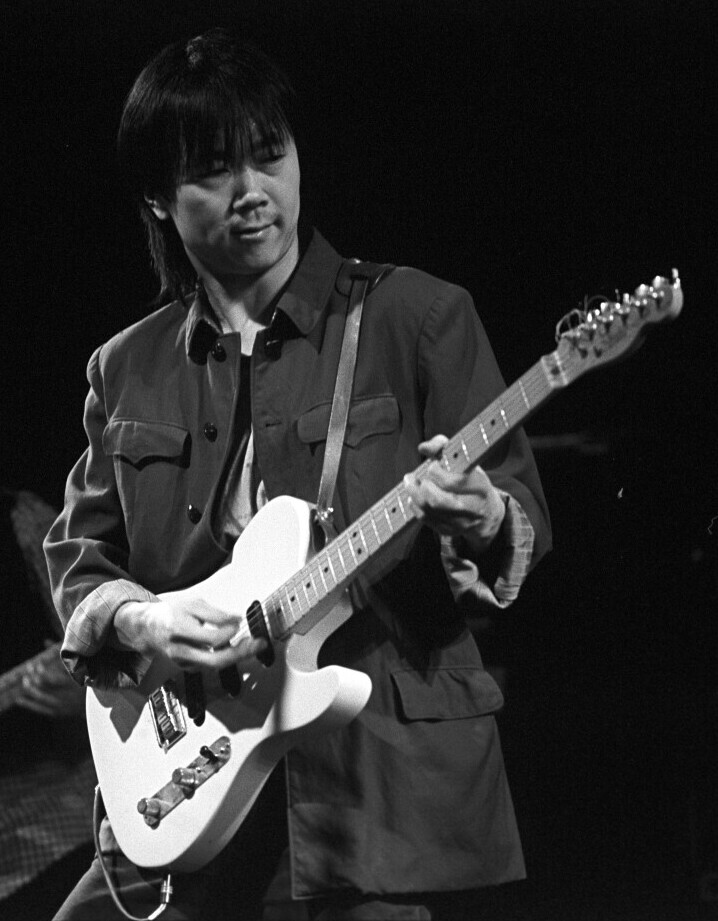
- Cui in 1993
- Studio albums: 11
- Soundtrack albums: 7
- Live albums: 1
- Compilation albums: 5
- Tribute albums: 1
- Singles: 7
- Video albums: 4
- Music videos: 8
- Split albums: 1
- Remix albums: 1

The following is the discography of Chinese singer-songwriter and musician Cui Jian. Since the release of Contemporary European and American Popular Jazz Disco in 1984, Cui has produced and taken part in recording a prolific number of albums. Rock 'n' Roll on the New Long March is officially considered to be the first solo album by him. Until 2002, Cui has sold 12 million officially counted genuine copies. However, at least 80 percent of tapes containing his music in China are pirated copies. It is estimated that his total album sales have reached approximately 100 million copies when the bootleg recordings are included.

== Albums ==
=== Studio albums ===
Title	Album details	Certifications
Contemporary European and American Popular Jazz Disco (当代欧美流行爵士Disco)	Released: 1984; Label: China Audio & Video Publishing	
I'll Tell You in My Dream (梦中的倾诉)	Released: 1985; Label: CRC, King	
Returning Wanderer (浪子归)	Released: 1986; Label: Shenzhen Audio and Video, BMG, Rock	
Rock 'n' Roll on the New Long March (新长征路上的摇滚)	Released: April 1989; Label: Beyoung, Jingwen, Coden, EMI	IFPI HK: Platinum; RIT: 2x Platinum
Solution (解决)	Released: February 1991; Label: Jingwen, East West, EMI, Coden, UFO	
Balls Under the Red Flag (红旗下的蛋)	Released: August 1994; Label: Jingwen, East West, EMI	
The Power of the Powerless (无能的力量)	Released: April 1998; Label: Jingwen, East West, EMI	
Show You Colour (给你一点颜色)	Released: March 23, 2005; Label: Jingwen, East West	
Frozen Light (光冻)	Released: December 25, 2015; Label: Sony Music	
A Flying Dog (飞狗)	Released: August 27, 2021; Label: Zhengdong, UMG	

==== As Seven-Player Band ====
Title	Album details
With Seven-Player Band (七合板演唱专辑)	Released: 1987; Labels: China Travel & Tourism Press; Formats: LP

=== Remix albums ===
Title	Details	Notes
A Revolution Re-mixed. The Disordered Sound Of Cui Jian (新长征路上的电子摇滚, literally "Electronic Rock 'n' Roll on the New Long March")	Released: June 20, 2007; Label: East West; Format: CD, vinyl record	Collaborated with DJ Hyper, Hybrid, and Sugar Daddy.

=== Split albums ===
Year	Album details
Wang Hong Cui Jian (王虹☆崔健) (with Wang Hong)	Released: 1990; Labels: Jingwen; Formats: LP

=== Live albums ===
Title	Album details
Cui Jian Beijing Concert	Released: 1993; Labels: Jingwen; Formats: LP

=== Box sets ===
Title	Album details
Serve the People	Released: 2011; Labels: Jingwen; Formats: CD

=== Soundtrack albums ===
Year	Album	Notes	Ref.
1986	The Legend of Shireet (希热图的传说)	Performing the theme song "Injured Eagle" (受伤的苍鹰).	
1986	Paint A Rainbow (调色板)		
1988	Please Take Care (请多多关照)	Performing the theme song "The Moment of Love" (爱的瞬间).	
1990	Island of Fire (火燒島)		
1993	Beijing Bastards (北京杂种)		
2000	Devils on the Doorstep (鬼子来了)		
2001	Roots and Branches (我的兄弟姐妹)		

=== Compilation albums ===
Year	Album details
Best of Cui Jian: 1986–1996	Released: 1996; Labels: East West; Formats: CD
Cui Jian Best Album	Released: 1997; Labels: Woongjin Music; Formats: CD
Cui Jian: The Beginning 1986-1998	Released: 2003; Labels: Bailong Music; Formats: CD
Best Of Cui Jian 1986-1996	Released: June 5, 2006; Labels: EMI; Formats: CD
The 3rd Sound of China	Released: April 16, 2013; Labels: East West; Formats: Digital download, streaming

== Singles ==
Title	Year	Peak chart positions	Album
Title	Year	CHN TME	Album
"Far away" (在遠方)	1989	—	Returning Wanderer
"Fake Monk" (假行僧)	1989	—	Rock 'n' Roll on the New Long March
"Piece of Red Cloth" (一块红布)	1991	—	Solution
"Wild on the Snow" (快让我在这雪地上撒点儿野)	1991	—	Solution
"Last Shot" (最後一槍)	1991	—	Island of Fire Movie Soundtrack Sampler
"I Have Nothing" (一無所有)	2006	—	Wang Hong Cui Jian
"A Flying Dog" (飞狗)	2021	3	A Flying Dog

== Video albums ==
Year	Video details	Notes
Cui Jian Concert	Released: 1997; Distributor: Beiying; Format: VCD	
Cui Jian Chinese Rock Concert	Released: 2000; Distributor: New Era Video; Format: VCD	
Cui Jian Super Live	Released: November 2007; Distributor: East West; Format: VCD, DVD-5	
Rock Symphony Live Concert	Released: August 23, 2017; Distributor: Sony Music; Format: DVD, CD	Includes the full recordings of the 2010 Rock Symphony Live Concert.

== Music videos ==
Year	Music video	Director
1991	"Piece of Red Cloth"	Zhang Yuan
1991	"Wild on the Snow"	Zhang Yuan
1991	"Last Shot"	Zhang Yuan
1994	"Flying"	Zhang Yuan
1995	"Rock 'n' Roll on the New Long March"	Unknown
2005	"Mr. Red"	Lao Jiang
2015	"Outside Girl"	Cui Jian
2015	"No Turning Back"	Cui Jian
2021	"A Flying Dog"	Cui Jian
2021	"The B-Side of Time"	Cui Jian

== Other album appearances ==
Year	Song(s)	Album	Notes	Ref.
1985	"Happy Night" (欢乐之夜)	Sun of Love (爱的太阳)		
1985	"I Can Not Tell You" (我无法告诉你)	It's Stii Raining Heavily (大雨还在下)		
1985	"Meet and Separate" (相遇又分离)	It's Stii Raining Heavily (大雨还在下)		
1985	"Hui" (迴)	Light The Sun (点燃太阳)		
1985	"Dance of Youth" (青春舞曲)	Light The Sun (点燃太阳)	Cover from Lo Ta-yu.	
1985	"Step Around The World" (走遍天涯路)	Foreign Country Music (外国乡村音乐)		
1985	"Left and Right" (左右)	Foreign Country Music (外国乡村音乐)		
1985	"Busy" (忙碌)	Foreign Country Music (外国乡村音乐)		
1985	"Upper Class Girl" (上层姑娘)	Foreign Country Music (外国乡村音乐)	Sings in English.	
1985	"Monologue of the Heart" (心的独白)	Shining New Stars (星新星)		
1986	"Filling the World with Love" (让世界充满爱)	Filling the World with Love (让世界充满爱)	Participate in the choir.	
1986	"Nothing to My Name" (一无所有)	Filling the World with Love (让世界充满爱)	Live version.	
1986	"Nothing to My Name" (一无所有)	Nationwide 100 Star Singers Collection, Vol. 1 (全国百名歌星荟萃精选1)	First studio version of "Nothing to My Name".	
1986	"It's Not That I Don't Understand" (不是我不明白)	Nationwide 100 Star Singers Collection, Vol. 1 (全国百名歌星荟萃精选1)		
1986	"No" (没有)	Five Color Spectrum (五色谱)		
1986	"Smile To the World" (世界的微笑)	Five Color Spectrum (五色谱)		
1986	"Only Love" (唯有爱)	Your Eyes (你的眼睛)	Sings with female singer Yu Jiayi.	
1986	"You'll Come Back Today" (今天你将归来)	Your Eyes (你的眼睛)		
1986	"Your Eyes" (你的眼睛)	Your Eyes (你的眼睛)		
1986	"Desert of Love" (爱的荒漠)	Smile of the World (世界的微笑)		
1986	"Say Goodbye" (告别)	Smile of the World (世界的微笑)		
1987	"Last Shot" (最后一枪)	Nameless Highland: China Red Singing Stars Golden Song Collection, Vol. 1 (无名高地——中国红歌星金曲选第一集)		
1987	"We All Love Disco" (我们都喜爱迪斯科)	Ah-Ge, Chase (阿哥，追)		
1987	"Where" (在哪里)	Ah-Ge, Chase (阿哥，追)		
1987	"Ah-Ge, Chase" (阿哥，追)	Ah-Ge, Chase (阿哥，追)		
1987	"Joy and Freedom" (欢乐和自由)	Ah-Ge, Chase (阿哥，追)		
1987	"Dance, Sing" (跳吧，唱吧)	Ah-Ge, Chase (阿哥，追)		
1987	"Still Love You" (仍然爱你)	Local Customs and Practices (风土人情)	Sings in English.	
1987	"Fear" (恐惧)	Local Customs and Practices (风土人情)		
1987	"Filling the World with Love" (让世界充满爱)	Local Customs and Practices (风土人情)	Cui Jian, Hu Xiaoqing, Li Fangfang, and Yao Lin sing together.	
1988	"Child's Dream" (孩子的梦幻)	Dream Lover (梦中情人)		
1988	"Speechless" (无言)	Star Singers Pop Chart (歌星龙虎榜)		
1988	"Legend of Love" (爱的传说)	Star Singers Pop Chart (歌星龙虎榜)	Sings with female singer Hu Xiaoqing.	
1989	"Mo Li Hua" (茉莉花)	Fate Card (命运纸牌)	Cui Jian, Yang Leqiang, and Wen Bo sing together.	
1993	""OCTOBER" The 4th Year of One Hundred Years of Solitute 1987" (1987 百年之孤寂第四年－拾月)	Noise/Zuni (進念聲音)		
1997	"Get Over That Day" (超越那一天)	Born on July 1 (七月一日生)		
2023	"Tea in the Sahara"	Police Beyond Borders	Cover from The Police.	

== Cui as an accompanist ==
Year	Artist	Title	Songs	Notes
1993	Chen Jing	Red Rope: Released: 1993; Label: Great Earth Records	All nine songs (harmonica, trumpet)	
1995	Zang Tianshuo	My Ten Years: Released: 1995; Label: Shanghai Audiovisual Company	"Compatibility" (trumpet)	
1996	Liu Yuan	Dreaming of Peach Blossom: Released: May 1996; Label: Rock Records	"Yesterday" (trumpet), "Improvising Hour" (harmonica), "Jazz" (trumpet)	Liu Yuan's debut album. Cui was involved in the composition of "Improvising Hour" and appeared in its music video.
1996	Zhou Ren	Extortion: Released: 1996; Label: China Fire	"Dizzy" (trumpet)	
1997	Zi Yue	Vol.1: Released: April 1997; Label: Jingwen	All nine songs (director, keyboard, mixing)	
1999	Zi Yue	Rock'n Roll Classics China the 20th Century 1: Released: 1999; Label: Jingwen	"In Front of the Thing" (keyboard, trumpet, backing vocal)	
1999	Zi Yue	Rock'n Roll Classics China the 20th Century 2: Released: 1999; Label: Jingwen	"Relatively" (keyboard)	
1999	69	Wuliao Contingent: Released: August 1999; Label: Jingwen	"10000 Years Punk" (trumpet solo)	
2012	Luo Ning	Unknown Journey: Released: September 2012; Label: Rhymoi Music	"Unknown Journey" (trumpet)	
2021	Luo Ning	The Continuation of the Breath: Released: April 2021; Label: self-issued	"The Continuation of the Breath" (trumpet)	
