= Childhood (album) =

Studio album by Sylvia Chang
- Released: 1981
- Label: Rock Records
- Producer: Lo Ta-yu

Childhood (Chinese: 童年; pinyin: tóngnián) is an album by Sylvia Chang, released in 1981 in Taiwan by Rock Records and in 1982 in Hong Kong by Fontana Records. It is Chang and Lo Ta-yu's second collaboration and Lo's first album as a producer. Within three years at China Medical University (Taiwan) before his graduation in 1979, Lo wrote songs of this album. Some songs, including the titular song of the same name, have been later sung by other singers, like the album's songwriter Lo and the Taiwanese singer Su Rui.

== Track listing ==
Side one

All songs written and arranged by Lo Ta-yu, unless otherwise noted

1. "Everyone Comes Together" (大家一起来; dàjiā yīqǐ lǎi) — 4:06
2. "liúshuǐ" (流水), "Running Water" or "Flowing Water", written by Lü Quansheng (呂泉生) — 0:34
  An a cappella song
3. "Childhood" (童年; tóngnián) — 3:35
  Later sung by Lo Ta-yu (in his 1983 album Zhi Hu Zhe Ye) and others
4. "dōng jǐng" (冬景), "Scene of Winter" or "Bright Winter", composed by Xiong Tianyi (熊天益), lyrics by Su Shi — 3:08
  Originally a poem from Song Dynasty (960–1279)
5. "Little Angel" (小天使; xiǎo tiānshǐ), written by Xiong Tianyi — 2:56
6. "Fallen Leaves" (落叶纷纷; luòyè fēnfēn) — 2:28

Side two

All songs written by Lo Ta-yu and arranged by Zheng Guichang (鄭貴昶), unless otherwise noted

1. "shìfǒu" (是否), "Whether or not" or "Will or will not" — 3:30
  Later sung by Su Rui with additional lyrics in her 1983 eponymous debut album
2. "Four Seasons" (四季; sìjì) — 2:20
3. "Story of Time" (光陰的故事; guāngyīn de gùshi) — 2:53
  Later sung by Lo Ta-yu in Zhi Hu Zhe Ye
4. "Wishing to Be the Moon" (希望像月亮; xīwàng xiàng yuèliang), written by Xiong Tianyi — 3:32
5. "chūn wàng" (春望), "Spring Wish" or "Toward Spring", arranged by Lo Ta-yu — 4:58

== Reception ==
Yao Hua praises Chang's performance of the titular song "Childhood" as [fresh and natural] (更显得清新自然).
