= Bloody Sunset =

- 血色残阳
- Genre: Thriller, domestic intrigue, Republican-era drama
- Written by: Lin Heping
- Directed by: Dong Zhiqiang
- Starring: Zhao Ziqi, Jia Yiping, Song Chunli, He Saifei, Shi Ke, Li Liqun, Xiu Qing, Gao Beibei
- Country of origin: China
- Original language: Mandarin Chinese
- No. of episodes: 30

Production
- Executive producer: Liu Yunlong
- Production companies: Beijing Oriental Alliance Film and Television Culture Communication Co., Ltd.

Original release
- Release: 16 December 2005 – present

Bloody Sunset (Chinese: 血色残阳) is a 2005 Chinese suspense television series set in the Republican era.

According to Chongqing Morning Post journalist Li Peng, the Tao family, a family in the television series, lived in a property that was "perpetually gloomy and eerie".
