= The Post =

The Post may refer to:

== Newspapers ==
=== United States ===
- New York Post
- St. Louis Post-Dispatch
- The Denver Post
- The Post (Ohio newspaper)
- The Washington Post

=== Elsewhere ===
- Post Newspapers, Australia
- South China Morning Post, Hong Kong
- The Jerusalem Post, Israel
- The Kathmandu Post, Nepal
- The Post (British newspaper), published for five weeks in 1988
- The Post (New Zealand newspaper), formerly The Dominion Post
- The Post (Pakistani newspaper)
- The Post (Zambia)

== Arts ==
- The Post (film), a 2017 historical drama about the Pentagon Papers and named after the Washington Post

== See also ==
- Daily Post (disambiguation)
- Evening Post (disambiguation)
- Morning Post (disambiguation)
- National Post, Canada
- Pittsburgh Post-Gazette, United States
- The Christian Post, United States
- The Saturday Evening Post (U.S. magazine)
- The Sunday Business Post, Ireland
- The Sunday Post, Scotland
- Posta, Turkish newspaper
