= Spion Kop (stadiums) =

Name for stands at sports stadiums, mostly in the UK

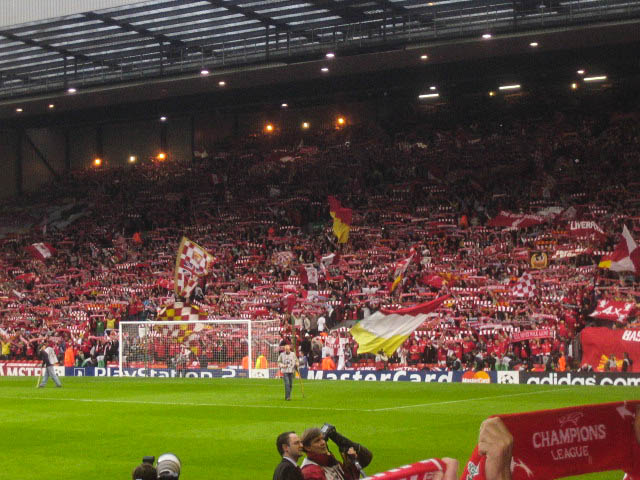
The Kop at Anfield

Spion Kop (or the Kop for short), also known as the Wall, is a colloquial name or term for a number of single-tier terraces and stands at sports stadiums, particularly in the United Kingdom. The steep nature resembles the Spion Kop, a hill near Ladysmith, South Africa, which was the scene of the Battle of Spion Kop in January 1900 during the Second Boer War.

Established in 1906, the Kop at Anfield, the home stadium of Premier League club Liverpool F.C., is one of the most famous football stands in the world. The global reputation of the Kop is referenced by the governing body of the sport FIFA, who state, "With scarves raised, banners aloft and flags flying, the Kop at Anfield has long held a standard for producing some of football's great sights and sounds".

== History ==
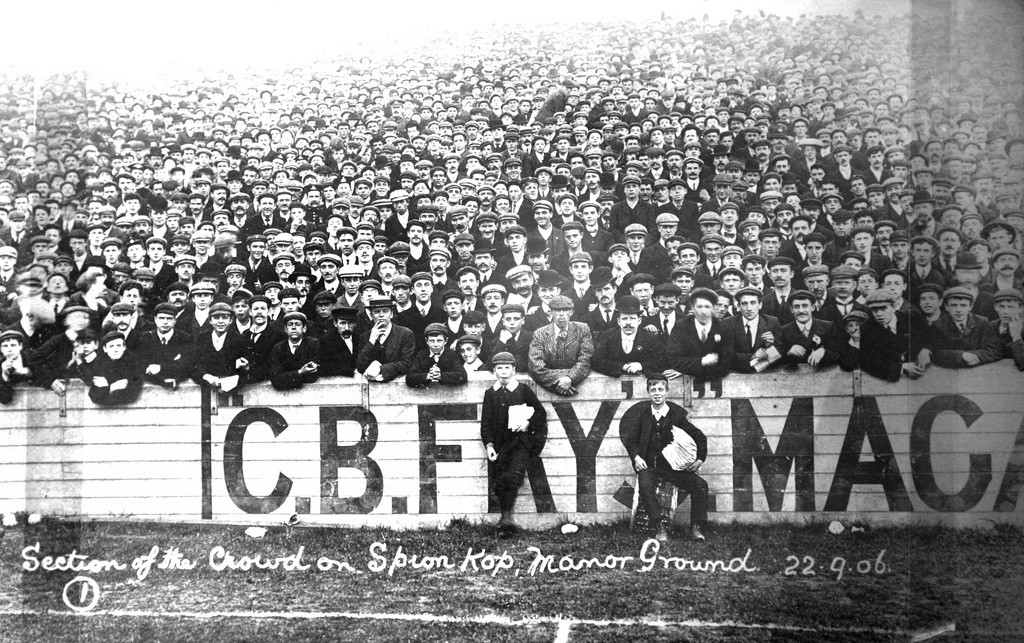
Spion Kop, Manor Ground

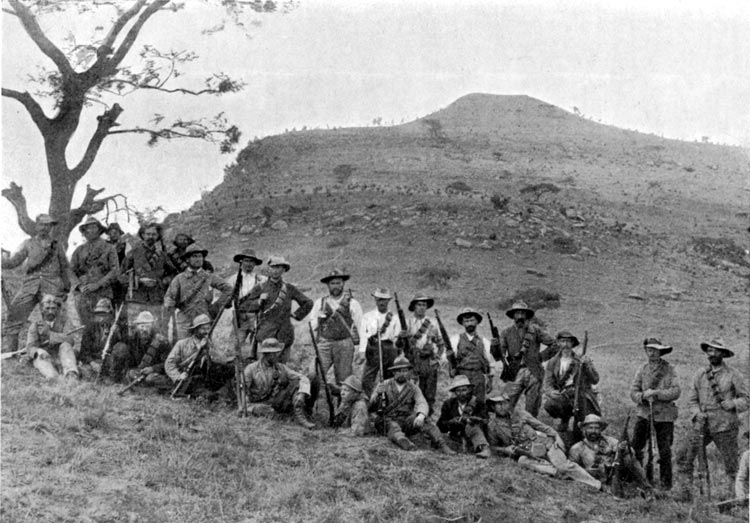
Boer soldiers at Spion Kop hill, 1900

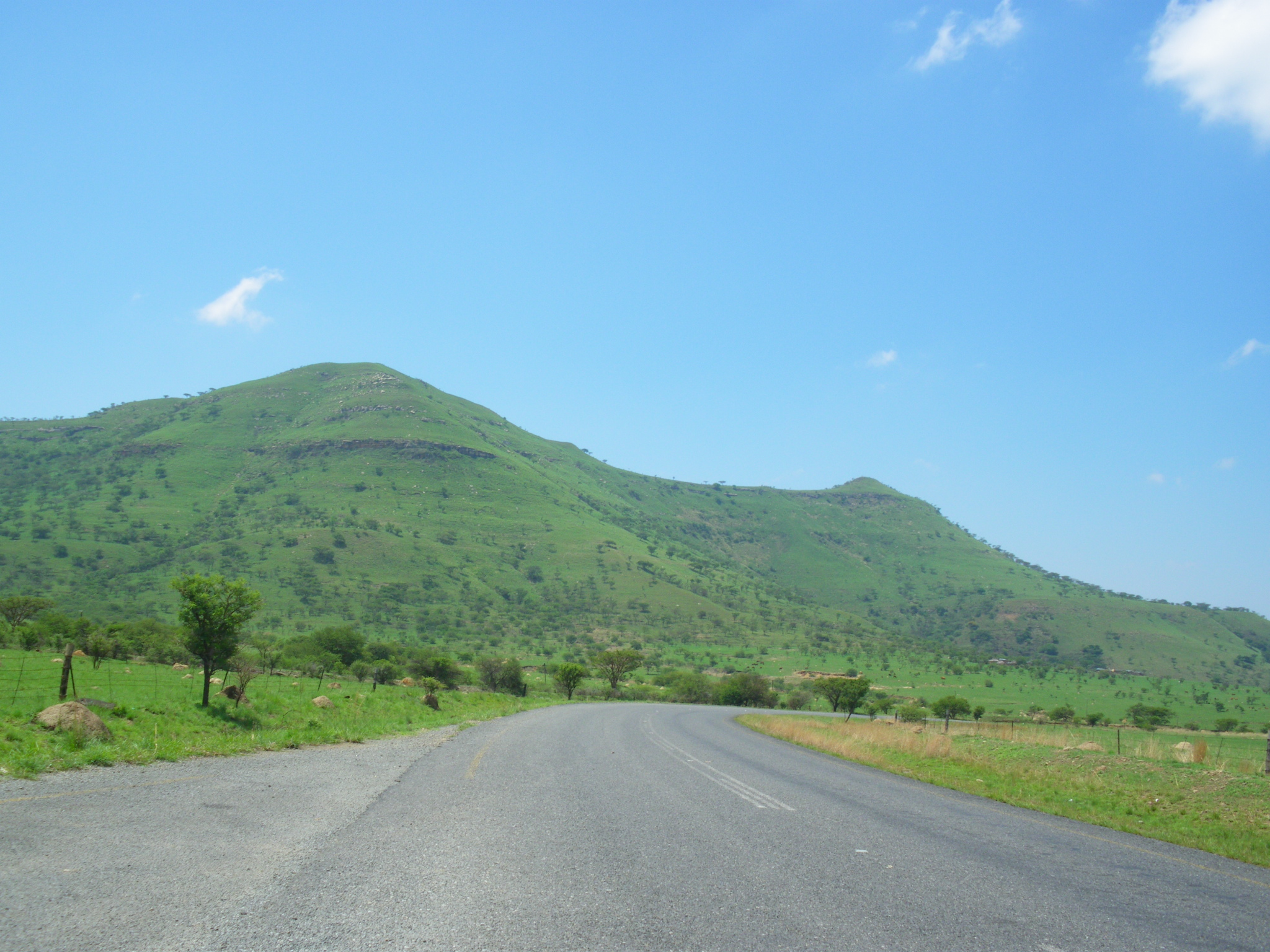
The Spion Kop hill near Ladysmith, South Africa

The first recorded reference to a sports terrace as "Kop" related to Woolwich Arsenal's Manor Ground in 1904, four years after the Second Boer War. A local newsman likened the silhouette of fans standing on a newly raised bank of earth to soldiers standing atop the hill at the Battle of Spion Kop. Two years later in 1906, Liverpool Echo sports editor Ernest Edwards noted of a new open-air embankment at Anfield:

This huge wall of earth has been termed "Spion Kop", and no doubt this apt name will always be used in future in referring to this spot.

After Liverpool had won their second League title in 1906, a new stand was built along the Walton Breck Road. Designed by architect Archibald Leitch, it was originally referred to as the Oakfield Road Embankment before it was formally renamed Spion Kop the same year. While it resembled the hill it was named after, it was also used in honour of the many Liverpudlians who died in the Battle of Spion Kop between 23 January and 24 January 1900. The first match in front of the Kop saw Liverpool defeat Stoke City 1–0 on 1 September 1906. While it is likely that it was Liverpool supporters, many of whom had fought in the war, who first referred to it as the Kop, from which Edwards then picked up on and supported its use in the Liverpool Echo, the club's site states that "only after 1912 was it consistently referenced in press reports as the Kop."

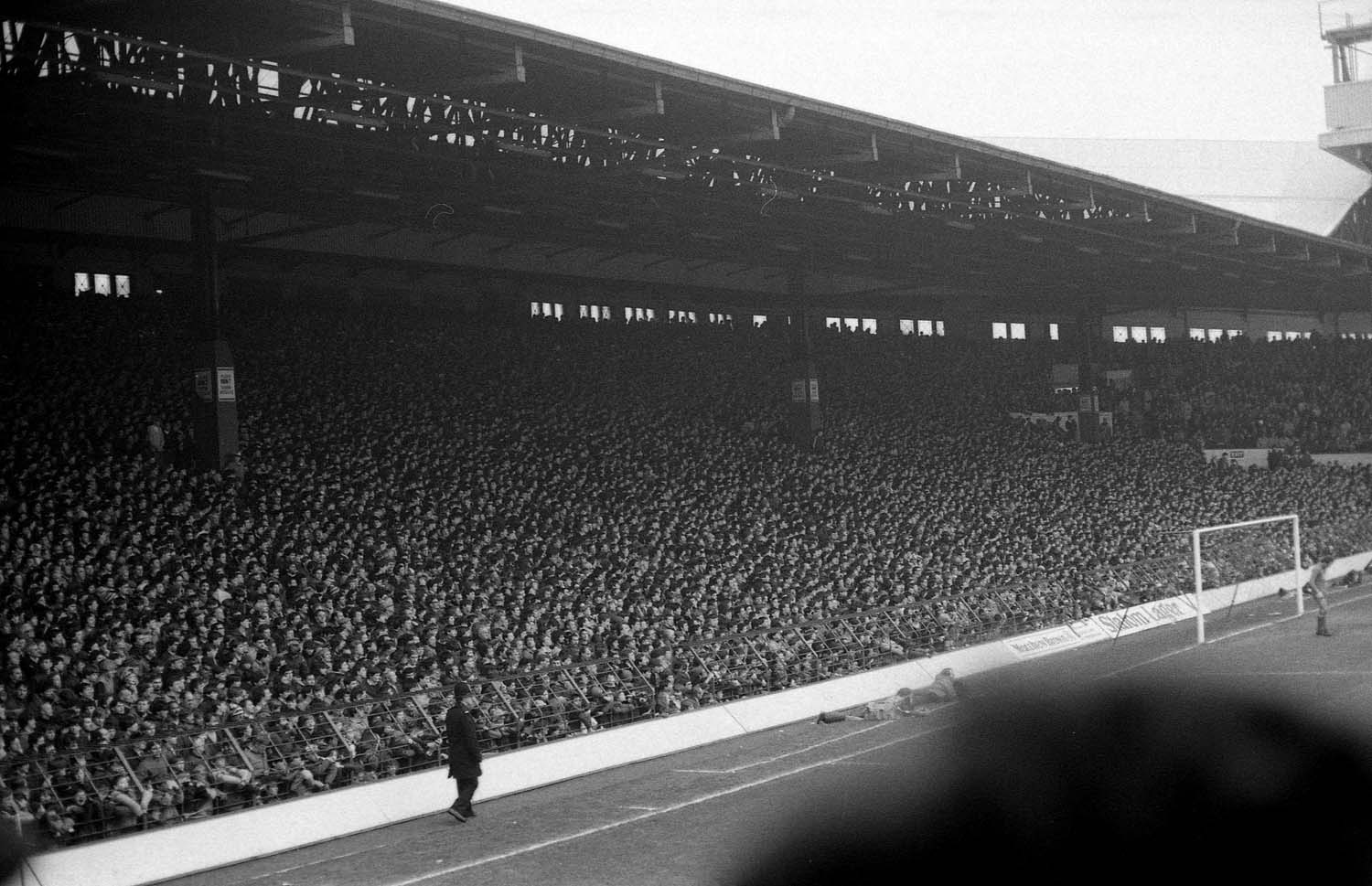
The Kop at Anfield, when it was all standing

The use of the name for the stand was given recognition at Anfield in 1928 when it was extended to a 27,000 capacity and a cantilever roof was added which amplified the roar of the crowd to create an intense atmosphere. Traditionally, Liverpool's most vocal supporters congregate in this stand and are referred to as Kopites. Such is the reputation of the stand that it was claimed that the crowd in the Kop could suck the ball into the goal and it has become one of the most famous football stands in the world.

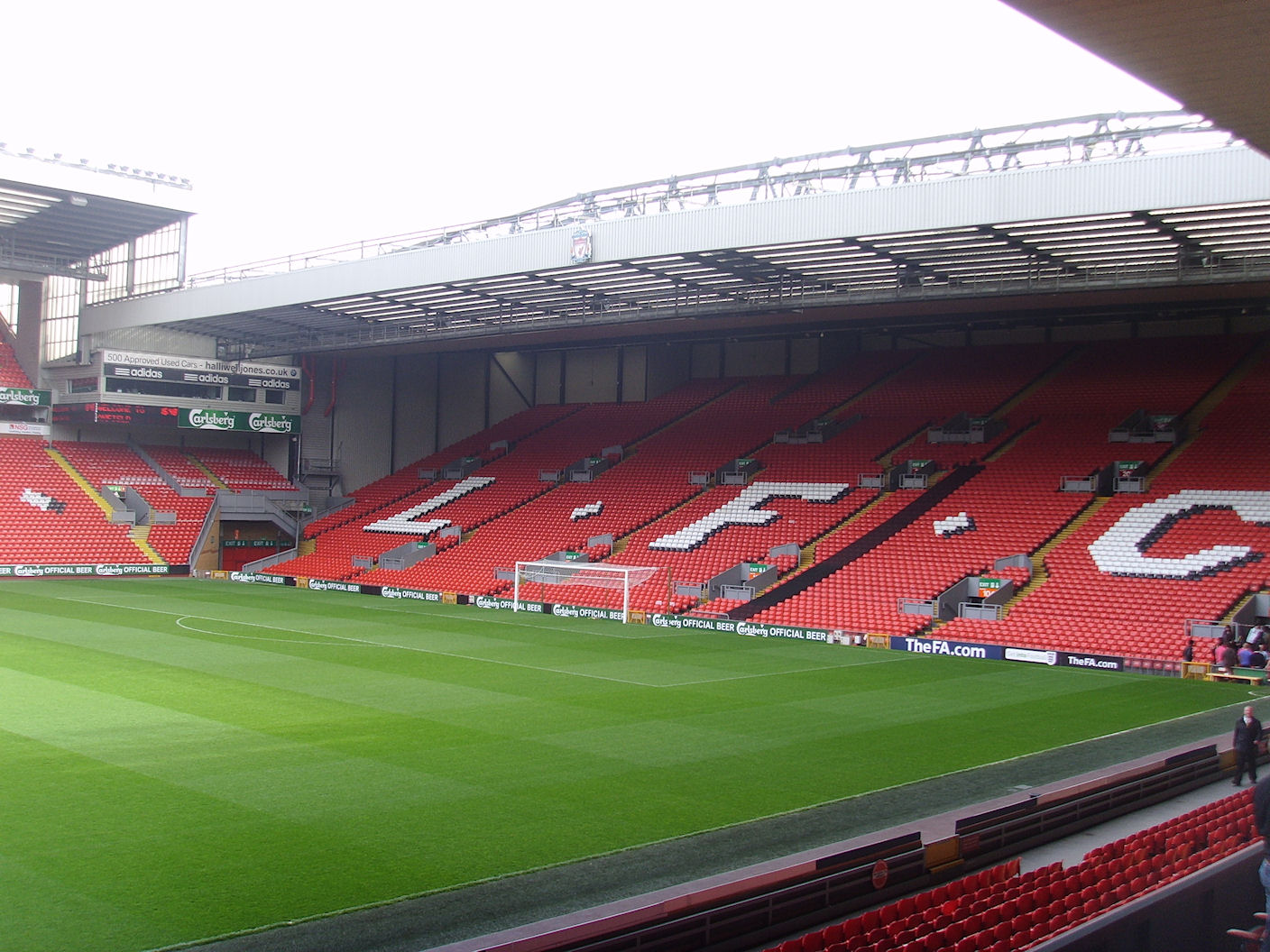
The Kop at Anfield after it was changed to all seating

Liverpool's 1920s championship winning goalkeeper Elisha Scott, whose spectacular saves generated as much adulation as a Liverpool goal, made a point of thanking the Kop in his leaving speech in 1934: "Last, but not least, my friends of the Kop. I cannot thank them sufficiently. They have inspired me." Manager Bill Shankly made reference to the Kop when speaking about his connection with Liverpool supporters: "I'm just one of the people who stands on the Kop. They think the same as I do, and I think the same as they do". Liverpool's Spion Kop (capacity 27,000, although crowds of 30,000+ have been recorded) was redesigned in 1994 (completed) to comply with requirements of the Taylor Report, which made all-seater stadiums obligatory in the highest two divisions of English football. A new Spion Kop was built in its place with 12,390 seats, making it the largest single-tier stand in the country at the time.

Following the opening of the new Tottenham Hotspur Stadium, Anfield's Kop ceased to be the largest single-tier stand in the country. The South Stand of the new stadium has 17,500 seats and has an incline of 34 degrees, making it one of the steepest stands in the country.

Manchester United's proposed new 100,000-capacity New Trafford Stadium will reportedly take inspiration from Tottenham's South Stand with a 'new Stretford End' to be a single-tier, steep stand which, due to the overall ground's significantly higher capacity, would likely house 25,000 supporters, indeed a stadium designed to the same proportions but with a 100,000 capacity would actually see this 'new Stretford End' holding as many as 29,000. Villa Park's old Holte End was historically the largest of all single-tier ends, closely followed by the old South Bank at Molineux, both once regularly holding crowds in excess of 30,000.

== Composition ==
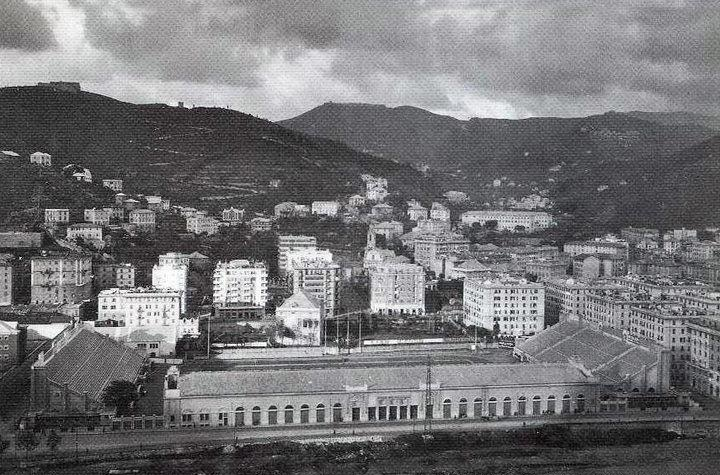
Historical view of the Stadio Luigi Ferraris in the 1920s–1930s, showing the old single-tiered terraced stands (known in Italy as gradinata).

The size and location of "a Kop" stand in the stadium varies; most are located behind the goal and are occupied by its club's most vocal supporters. It is usually a single-tiered stand and was traditionally terraced. In England, safety regulations brought into effect after the 1989 Hillsborough disaster required many to be made all-seated. A Kop is not necessarily the largest stand in the stadium and does not have to have a particularly large capacity; for example, Chesterfield's former stadium, Saltergate, had a Kop with a capacity of only a few thousand. In a broader sense, the word is used to describe any organized group of fans. The term used in Italy is "gradinata". At the Stadio Luigi Ferraris, it refers to the stands located behind the goals. Although they were completely rebuilt, their atmosphere continues to be compared to that of English stands, including Anfield's Kop.

== Kops ==
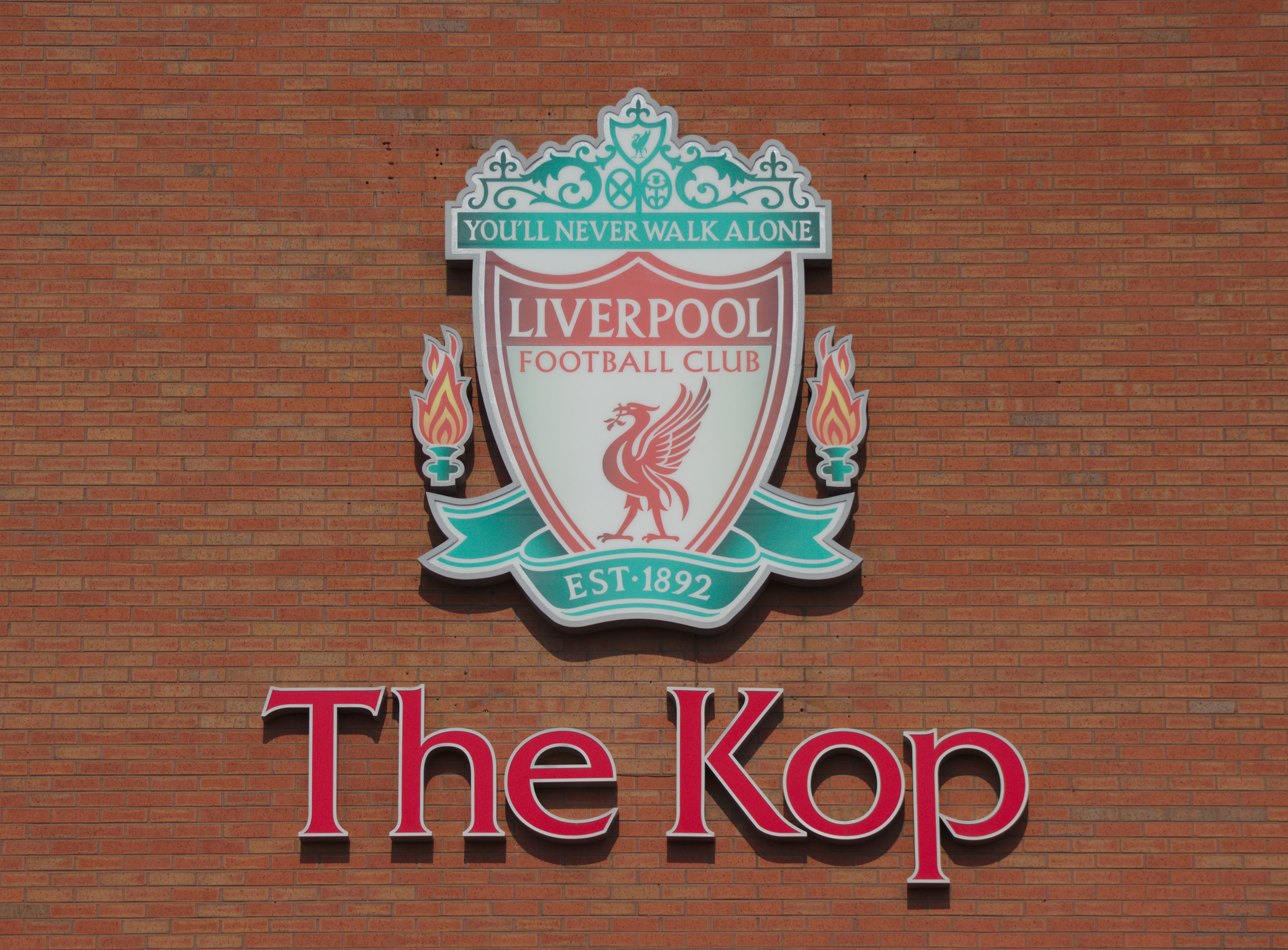
The Kop sign at Anfield

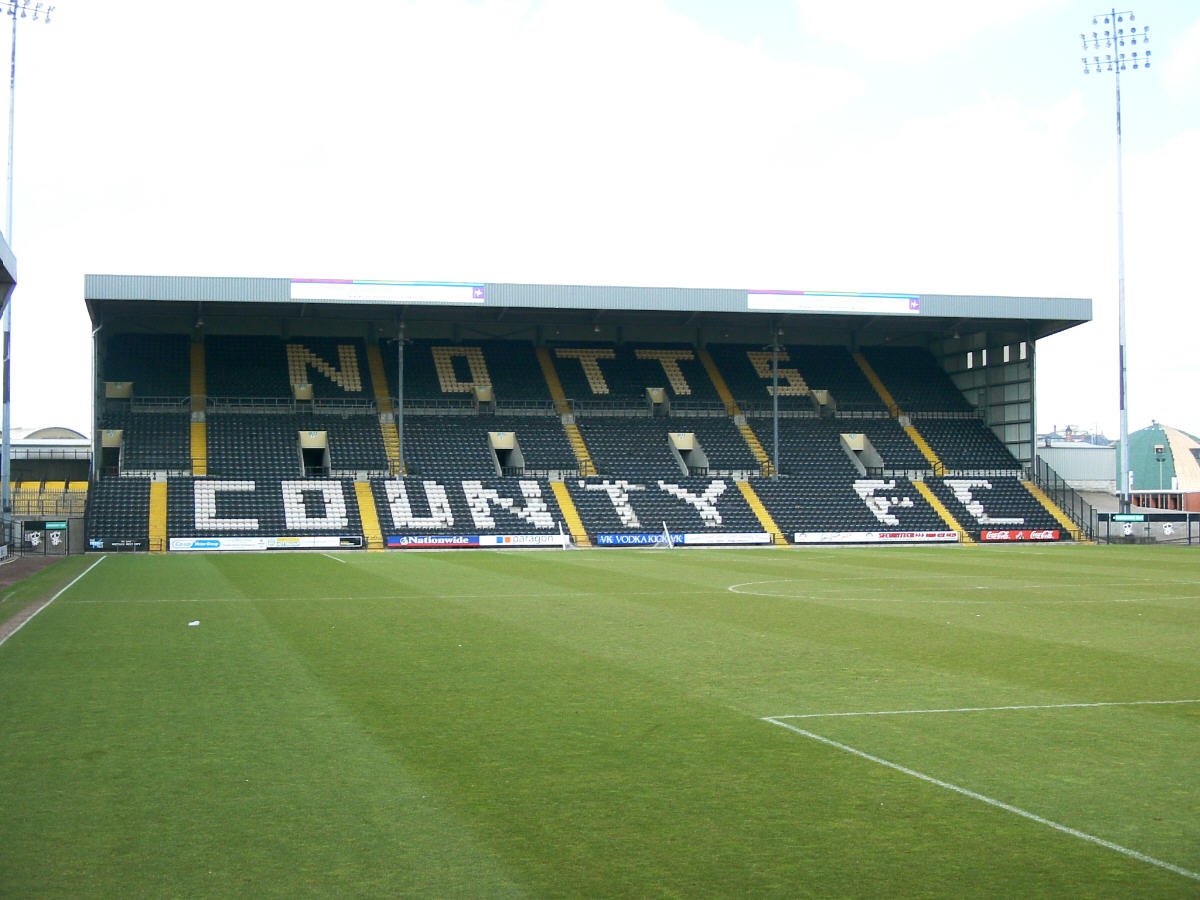
The Kop at Meadow Lane

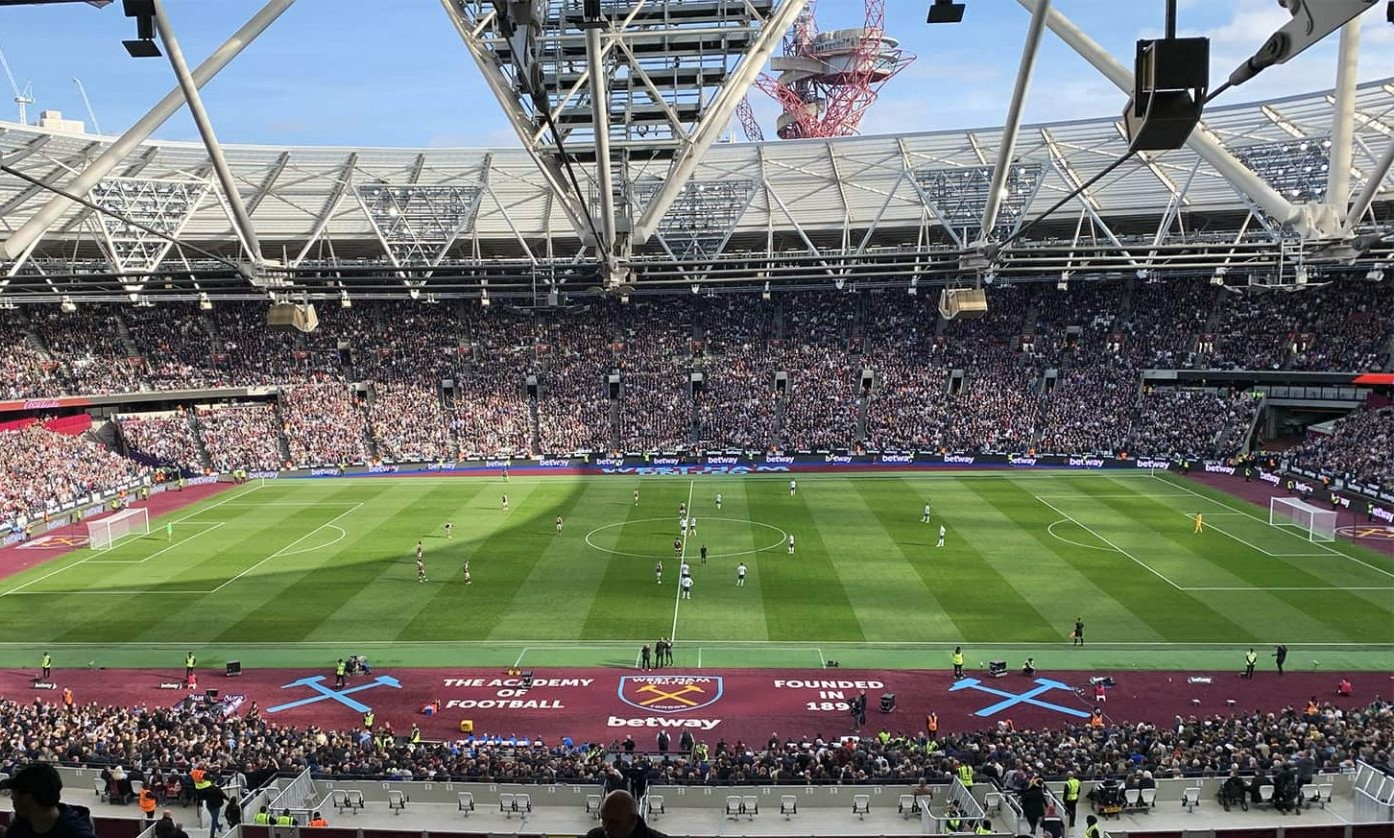
Billy Bonds stand at London Stadium

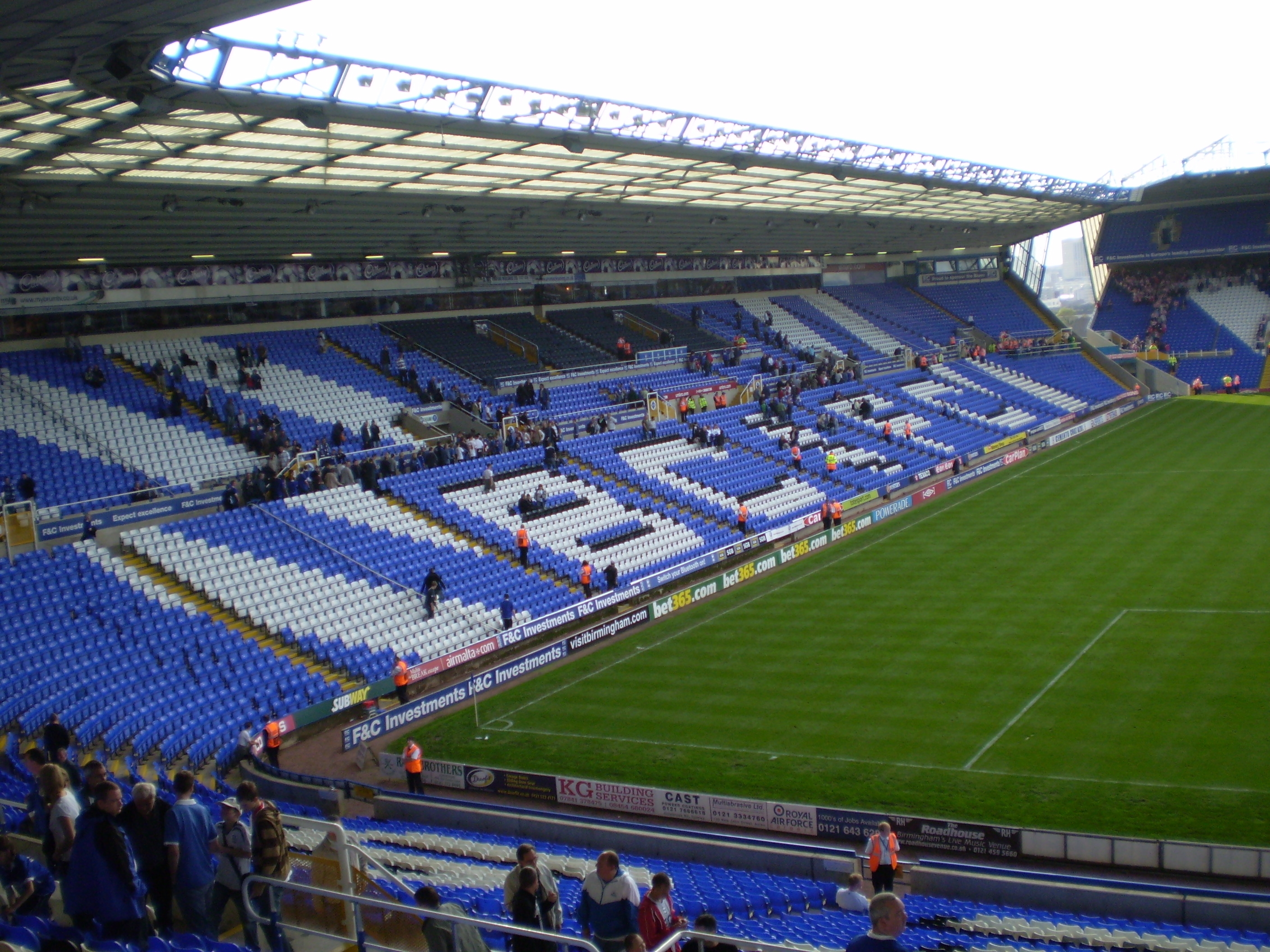
The Kop at St Andrew's

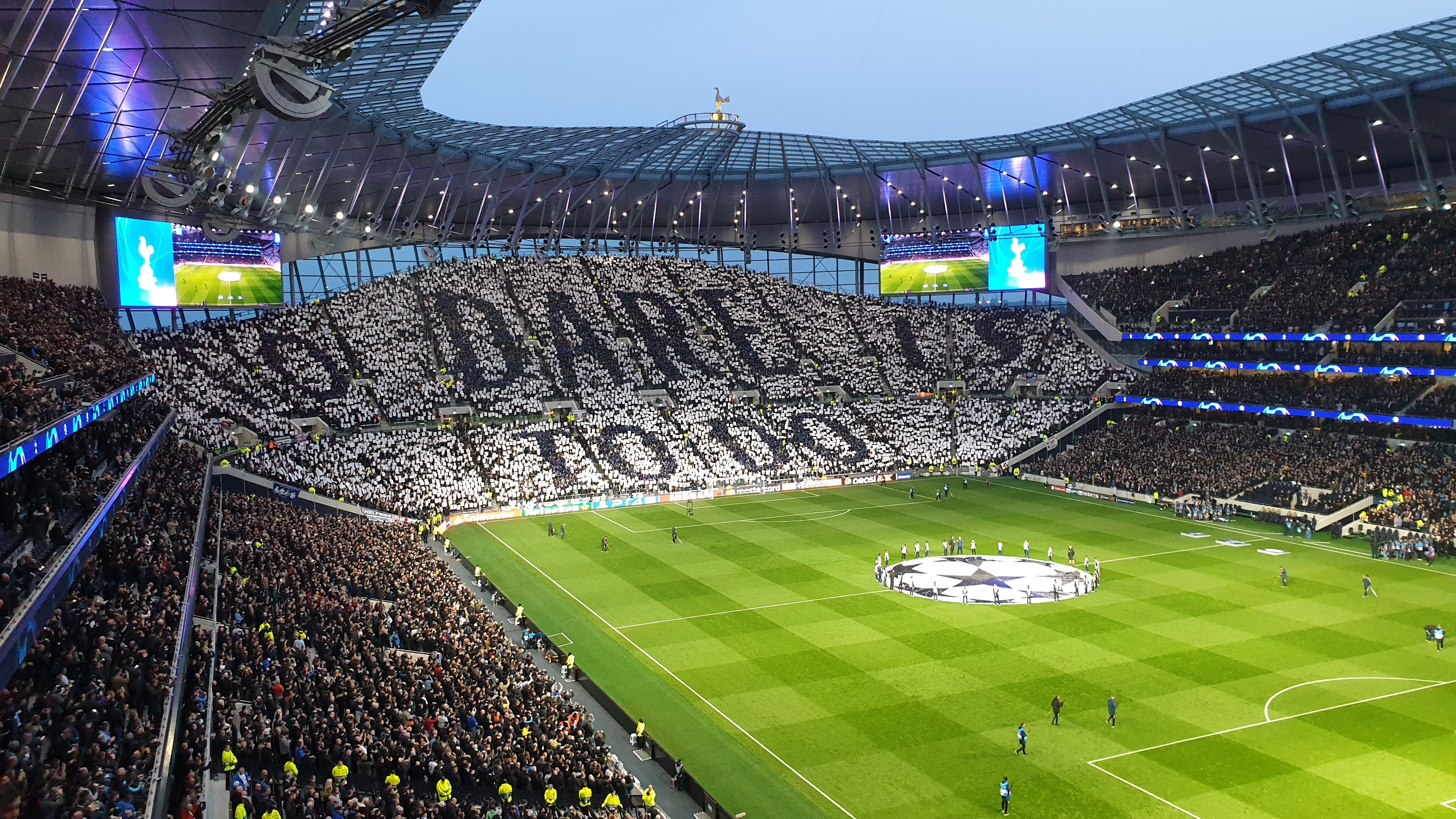
The South Stand at Tottenham Hotspur Stadium

Ground	Club	Stand
Anfield	Liverpool	Spion Kop
Central Park (demolished 1999)	Wigan Warriors RLFC	The Kop (demolished 1999)
Baseball Ground (demolished 2003–04)	Derby	Popside Kop (The Popside) (demolished 2003–04)
Bloomfield Road	Blackpool	Mortensen Kop
Bramall Lane	Sheffield United	The Kop
County Ground	Northampton Town	Spion Kop
Deepdale	Preston North End	Bill Shankly Kop
Elland Road	Leeds United	The Gelderd End or Kop (renamed The Don Revie Stand)
Molineux	Wolverhampton Wanderers	The Southbank (Sir Jack Hayward Stand)
Filbert Street (demolished 2003)	Leicester City	Spion Kop (Double Decker) (demolished 2003)
Fratton Park	Portsmouth	Spion Kop (renamed as The Milton End)
Highfield Road (demolished 2006)	Coventry City	The Spion Kop Terrace (demolished 2006)
Hillsborough Stadium	Sheffield Wednesday	Spion Kop
Home Park	Plymouth Argyle	Spion Kop (demolished 2001)
Knowsley Road (demolished 2011)	St Helens R.F.C.	The Kop (demolished 2011)
London Stadium	West Ham	Billy Bonds Stand (East Stand)
Manor Ground (demolished c.1913)	Woolwich Arsenal	Spion Kop (demolished c.1913)
Meadow Lane	Notts County	Spion Kop
Oakwell	Barnsley	Spion Kop (demolished 1998)
Prenton Park	Tranmere Rovers	Essar Kop Stand
Racecourse Ground	Wrexham	The Kop (demolished 2023. New one in construction)
Recreation Ground (demolished 2012)	Chesterfield	Spion Kop (demolished 2011)
St Andrew's	Birmingham City	Spion Kop
Stade de la Meinau	RC Strasbourg	Ouest Kop
Tottenham Hotspur Stadium	Tottenham Hotspur	South Stand/Park Lane
Wilderspool Stadium (demolished 2014)	Warrington Wolves	Spion Kop (demolished 2014)
Valley Parade	Bradford City	The Kop End
King Power Stadium	Leicester City	South Stand/Fosse Stand (The Kop)
Windsor Park	Linfield / Northern Ireland	The Kop
Parc des Princes	Paris Saint-Germain	Kop of Boulogne
Westfalenstadion	Borussia Dortmund	Südtribüne/Gelbe Wand (English: The Yellow Wall)
Stade Vélodrome	Olympique de Marseille	Virage Sud, Virage Nord
Inter.co Stadium	Orlando City SC	The Wall
Intuit Dome	Los Angeles Clippers	The Wall
Stadio Luigi Ferraris	Genoa CFC, UC Sampdoria	Gradinata Nord, Gradinata Sud (single-tiered until 1987)

== Sources ==
- Inglis, Simon. The Football Grounds of England and Wales (Collins Willow, 1982)
- Kelly, Stephen F. The Kop, (Virgin Books, 2005)
- Pearce, James. How Kop tuned in to glory days, Liverpool Echo. 23 August 2006.
- Chapple, Mike (25 August 2006). "Spion Kop's mixture of myth and magic". Daily Post. Liverpool, England. Archived from the original on 16 March 2012 – via HighBeam Research.
