= Queen's Road East (song) =

1991 song by Lo Ta-yu

- Queen's Road East album cover

Song by Lo Ta-yu featuring Ram Chiang

from the album 皇后大道東 (Queen's Road East)
- Language: Cantonese
- Released: 23 January 1991
- Length: 4:10
- Label: Music Factory
- Composer: Lo Ta-yu
- Lyricist: Albert Leung

Chinese name
- Traditional Chinese: 皇后大道東
- Simplified Chinese: 皇后大道东
Transcriptions
Standard Mandarin
- Hanyu Pinyin: Huánghòudàdàodōng
Yue: Cantonese
- Jyutping: wong4hau6daai6dou6dung1

Official audio
- "皇后大道東 (feat. 蔣志光)" on YouTube

"Queen's Road East" (Chinese: 皇后大道東) is a song by Taiwanese singer-songwriter Lo Ta-yu, featuring Hong Kong singer Ram Chiang. It was released on 23 January 1991 as the title track of Lo's Cantonese-language compilation album of the same name. The song was composed by Lo and written by the lyricist Albert Leung. It is named after Queen's Road East, a street in Hong Kong, and satirically expresses the anxiety felt by the city's residents over the impending handover of Hong Kong in 1997.

The song was banned in Mainland China twice, once upon its release in 1991 and a second time in 2019, during that year's protests in Hong Kong.

== Background ==
Queen's Road was the first road in Hong Kong, built between 1841 and 1843. Named after Queen Victoria, it became a local landmark and a symbol of British rule. The modern road is split into four sections: Queen's Road West, Queen's Road Central, Queensway, and Queen's Road East.

Lo Ta-yu left Taiwan in 1985 to practice medicine in the United States, before moving to Hong Kong two years later. In 1991, he established his own record label called Music Factory, with the Queen's Road East album as its first release.

"Queen's Road East" was Lo's second song about Hong Kong after "Pearl of the Orient" (東方之珠), which he composed in 1986. While initially performed by Michael Kwan with Cantonese lyrics by Cheng Kok-kong, Lo later wrote and performed a Mandarin-language version of the "Pearl of the Orient", which appeared as the final track of the Queen's Road East album.

== Composition and lyrics ==
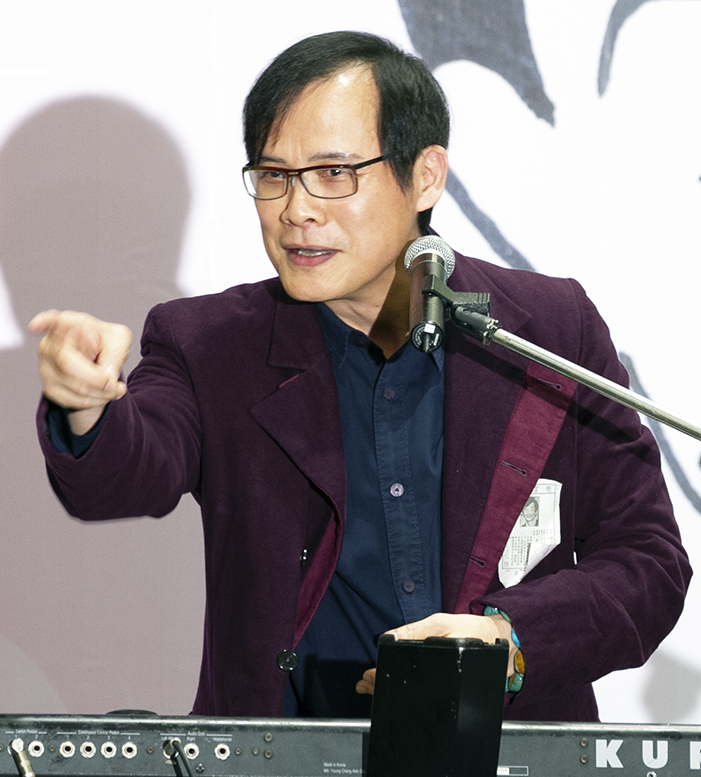
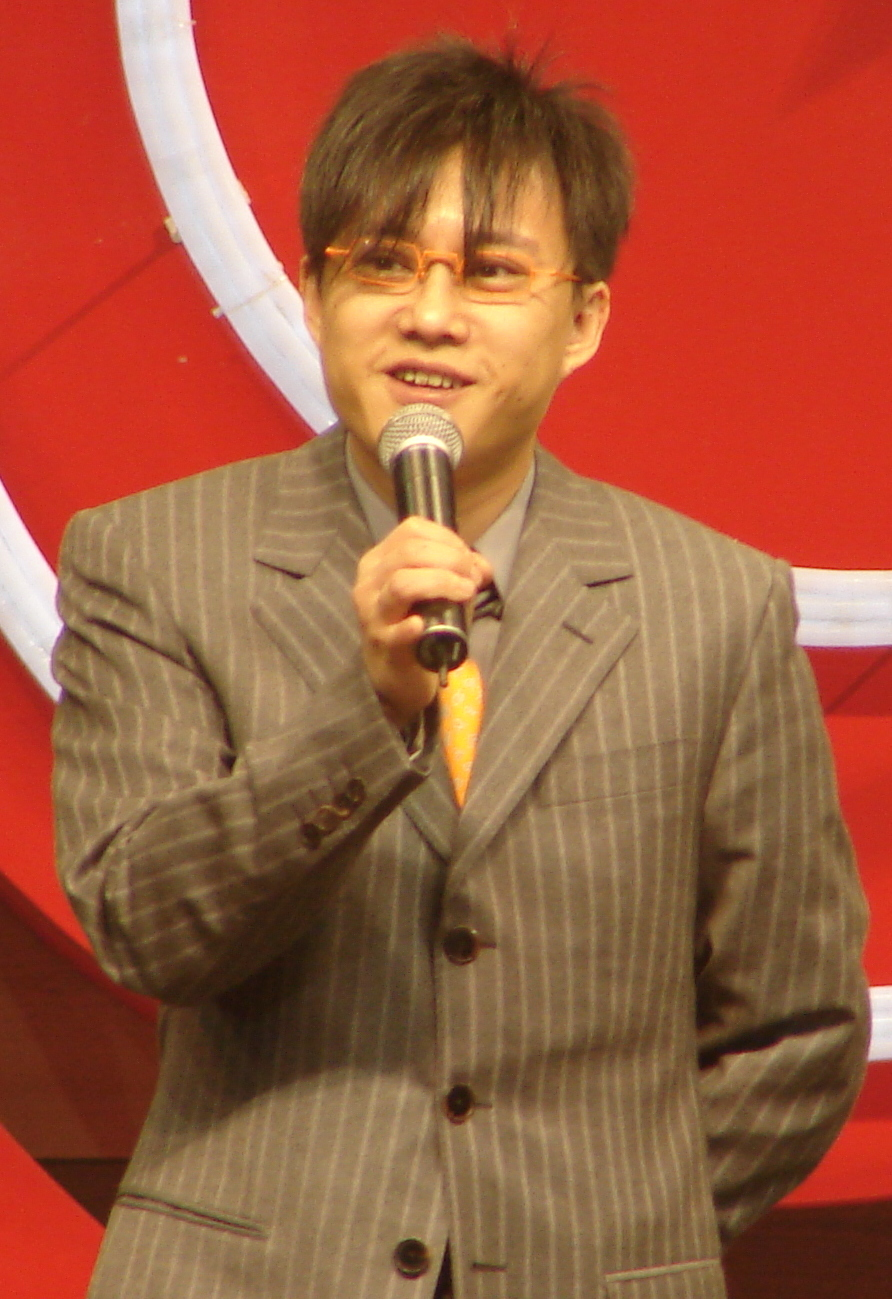
"Queen's Road East" was composed by Lo Ta-yu (left) with lyrics by Albert Leung.

Lo was inspired to write "Queen's Road East" by the sight of road signs while out shopping. He first composed the melody and basic lyrics for the chorus, which mention Queen's Road West, Queen's Road East, and Queen's Road Central. The lyrics were completed by the Hong Kong lyricist Albert Leung, who was introduced to Lo by his fellow lyricist James Wong Jim. Leung's lyrics satirically express the anxiety felt by the city's residents over the impending handover of Hong Kong in 1997. In 1991, he spoke of a possibly "more restrictive creative environment" after the handover, which drove him to write the song sooner rather than later. He expressed his hope that "people will still remember it [after 1997] and make comparisons... To exaggerate a bit, [the song] will serve as a historical witness".

In a 1991 episode of the RTHK programme Hong Kong Connection, Lo and Leung discussed the song's musical composition and lyrics. Lo said the song's "mystical" instrumental introduction reflects the "vibrancy" he sees in Hong Kong. He also explained his personal interpretation of "Queen's Road": "'Queen' obviously is the Queen of the United Kingdom. 'Road' is one's way of life. The United Kingdom is the global pioneer of capitalism, so the 'Queen's Road' is actually capitalism." Lo thus characterises the song's chorus, "Queen's Road West and Queen's Road East /Queen's Road East turns into Queen's Road Central" (Note: Chinese: 皇后大道西又皇后大道東 /皇后大道東轉皇后大道中) as a reference to the journey of Hong Kong (East) from the United Kingdom (West) to China (Central), while bringing along the capitalist system (Queen's Road).

"[Hong Kong people would] become the greatest of all comrades. [They] would truly get things done, have true constructiveness, truly use competition rather than struggle to get things done, and truly preserve Chinese tradition while incorporating with the best of [Western culture] ... With all these things, life will be better for everyone."

— Lo Ta-yu on Hong Kong people becoming "comrades", 1991

The song's lyrics mention both "the Queen" and "the Comrade". "The Queen" indirectly refers to the reigning British monarch at the time, Elizabeth II. The opening verse describes the Queen as a "noble friend on the back of coins" with "everlasting youth". (Note: Chinese: 有個貴族朋友在硬幣背後，青春不變名字叫做皇后) One verse also describes her as "beautiful even when saying goodbye", (Note: Chinese: 這個漂亮朋友道别亦漂亮) a reference to the nightly television sign-offs in British Hong Kong featuring "God Save the Queen" and the Queen's portrait. On the other hand, "the Comrade" is called a "virtuous friend" who "looks familiar and friendly, thus allowing horse races to continue twice a week". (Note: Chinese: 這個正義朋友面善又友善，因此批準馬匹一週跑兩天) This refers to the Chinese authorities' promises to allow horse races involving betting to continue in Hong Kong. The verse then ends by comparing the racing horses to the wealthy emigrants who too "must race toward the final destination" to flee the handover, commenting, "to become citizens of powerful countries, all you need is money".

One verse of the song laments that Hong Kong will "have to rely on great comrades to cook up new ideas". (Note: Chinese: 要靠偉大同志搞搞新意思) According to Leung and Lo, while the line implies the comrades are "the people up there [in Mainland China]", they intended it to refer to Hongkongers, as Leung believed that they would also be referred to as "comrades" (tongzhi in Chinese) after the handover. Thus, Lo intended the line to encourage the people of Hong Kong to succeed in the future.

== Release ==
The Queen's Road East album was released on 23 January 1991, with "Queen's Road East" as its title track.

Later that year, Lo released an album in Taiwan titled Homeland (原鄉), which included a Taiwanese Hokkien version of the song featuring Lim Giong, titled "Don't Be Surprised" (大家免著驚). This version was featured in the 1992 Taiwanese film Dust of Angels, in which Lim and Lo perform the song in a cameo appearance.

== Music videos ==
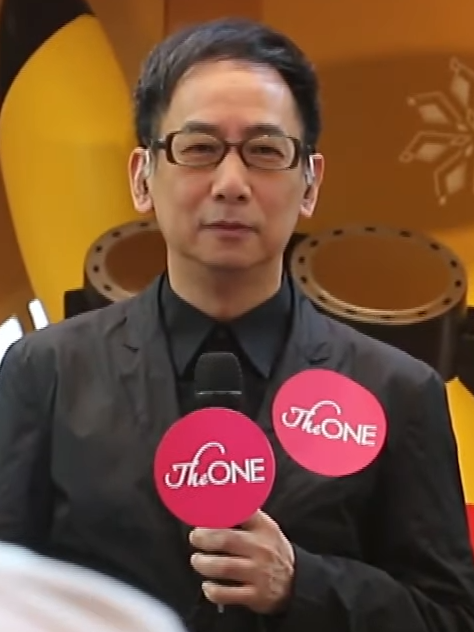
Ram Chiang performed vocals alongside Lo and appears in one of the music videos for "Queen's Road East".

One of the music videos for the "Queen's Road East" was produced by TVB. In the video, Lo and Chiang perform the song in Red Guard uniforms while uniformed young people imitate the poses of revolutionary statues and display red flags and banners. The video also shows cars and pedestrians moving in reverse, and the two singers imitating Chinese state leaders by walking along a street while clapping their hands. Researcher Sun Hongmei described the video as "shed[ding] all subtlety" compared to the song's lyrics, which rely on "uncertainty, uneasiness, and subtle satire".

An alternate music video for the song presents it in a more subtle manner, alternating between Lo and imagery of Hong Kong.

== Awards ==
"Queen's Road East" received awards for Best Lyrics and Best Composition at the 1991 Jade Solid Gold Best Ten Music Awards Presentation.

== Censorship ==
Due to its politically sensitive lyrics, "Queen's Road East" was banned in Mainland China upon its release in 1991, before being unbanned in 2000. During the Hong Kong protests in 2019, lyrics from the song were used by Mainland Chinese internet users to circumvent censorship on the topic and express support for the protests. According to Quartz, some comments may have been referring to the occupation of Queensway during the protests on 12 June 2019. "Queen's Road East" was removed from major Chinese music streaming platforms in June 2019, with some reports stating the song was banned due to its lyrics and association with the Hong Kong protests. Later that year, over 3000 songs written by Leung were reportedly taken off Chinese music streaming platforms after he voiced support for the protests in Hong Kong.

Also in 2019, the Sing Tao Daily reported that a karaoke operator in the Chinese city of Beihai was investigated and fined for playing a music video of "Queen's Road East", which features a scene with the portraits of Chinese state leaders repeated across the screen accompanied by the song's lyrics. The report cited an Administrative Penalty Decision by the local police, which characterised "Queen's Road East" as a "prohibited song" and stated that the scene "mocked" state leaders.

== Legacy ==
Lyrics from "Queen's Road East" were shared by Hong Kong internet users in remembrance of Queen Elizabeth II following her death in September 2022.
