= ADO (band) =

Chinese rock band (1986–1996)

- ADO with Cui Jian in Tiananmen Square in 1988. Left to right: Zhang Yongguang, Eddie Randriamampionona, Kassai Balazs, Liu Yuan, Cui Jian.

Background information
- Origin: Beijing, China
- Genres: Rock and roll
- Years active: 1986–1996
- Past members: Zhang Yongguang; Liu Yuan; Eddie Randriamampionona; Kassai Balazs

ADO were a seminal Sino-foreign rock band, formed in Beijing in 1986. They are most remembered for collaborating with Cui Jian, a partnership that yielded Cui's first complete album, Rock 'n' Roll on the New Long March, in 1989. The album included "Nothing to My Name", the first rock anthem in China, and Cui's most famous song.

The band took their name from the Swahili word for "friend". ADO included two foreigners: bassist Kassai Balazs, a Hungarian student, and guitarist/vocalist Eddie Randriamampionona, a Madagascan embassy worker. The band began collaborating with Cui Jian in 1987, the same year the latter left the Beijing Symphony Orchestra. In the years to come, most of ADO's members were absorbed into Cui's own backing band, and continued to tour and release new music with him.

ADO's song "I Just Can't Say It Casually (Chinese: 我不能随便说; pinyin: Wǒ Bùnéng Suíbiàn Shuō)" was featured on the first China Fire compilation, released in June 1992. The band released its only album, I Just Can't Say It Casually, in 1996, and subsequently disbanded.

On December 23, 2014, Zhang Yongguang committed suicide. Liu Yuan died from cancer on December 22, 2024.

== Members ==
- Zhang Yongguang (d. 2014) – drums
- Liu Yuan (d. 2024) – saxophone, woodwinds
- Eddie Randriamampionona – lead vocals, guitar
- Kassai Balazs – bass
