= Zhi Hu Zhe Ye =

1982 album by Lo Ta-yu

Chih Hu Che Yeh
- Standard artwork

Studio album by Lo Ta-yu
- Released: 1982
- Label: Rock Records

Chih Hu Che Yeh
- Chinese: 之乎者也
Transcriptions
Standard Mandarin
- Hanyu Pinyin: Zhīhū zhěyě
- Bopomofo: ㄓˉ ㄏㄨˉ ㄓㄜˇ ㄧㄝˇ
- Gwoyeu Romatzyh: jy hu jee yeh
- Wade–Giles: chih^{1} hu^{1} che^{3} yeh^{3}
- Tongyong Pinyin: jhih hu jhě yě
- IPA: [ʈʂɻ̩́xúʈʂɤ̀jè]

Chih Hu Che Yeh (Note: This transliteration appears on the 1987 Rock Records CD release.) (Chinese: 之乎者也; pinyin: Zhīhū Zhěyě) is the 1982 debut album of Taiwanese singer Lo Ta-yu.

The title of the album consists of a meaningless phrase made solely of four grammatical Chinese particles from Classical Chinese. The phrase functions as an adjective; if someone's Chinese is zhīhū zhěyě, it means it is stale and archaic.

The album broadened the horizons of Chinese music and set a new model for Chinese songwriting. The album had four hit singles: the title song "Zhi hu zhe ye" (之乎者也), "Lukang, the Little Town" (鹿港小鎮), "Love Song 1980" (戀曲1980), and "Childhood" (童年), previously sung by Sylvia Chang in her 1981 album Childhood. The singles from the album remain among Lo Ta-yu's best known songs in mainland China.

Internationally, the album was released in 1982 as the Selected Works of Lo Ta-yu (羅大佑作品選) by Fontana Records with two additional tracks, "Foolishly Waiting" (痴痴的等) and "Deaf-Blind" (盲聾).

== Track listing ==
Side A

1. "Lukang Township" (鹿港小鎮; Lùgǎng xiǎo zhèn)
  Lukang is located in northwestern Changhua County, Taiwan
2. "Love Song 1980" (戀曲1980; Liànqū yījiǔbā)
3. "Childhood" (童年; Tóngnián)
  Previously sung by Sylvia Chang in her 1981 album Childhood
4. "Mistake" (錯誤; Cuòwù)
5. "Lullaby" (摇篮曲; Yáolánqǔ)

Side B

1. "Zhīhūzhěyě" (之乎者也), "Archaisms" or "Semi-incomprehensible talk"
2. "Nostalgia of Four Rhymes" (鄉愁四韻; Xiāngchóu sì yùn)
3. "I Shall Drink Wine" (将进酒; Jiāng jìn jiǔ)
4. "Story of Time" (光陰的故事; Guāngyīn de gùshì)
  Previously sung by Sylvia Chang in her album Childhood
5. "Dandelion" (蒲公英; Púgōngyīng)
Selected Works of Lo Ta-yu (羅大佑作品選), 1982 — International edition (Fontana Records)

Side A

1. "Childhood" 童年
2. "Love Song" 戀曲
  Alternative title of "Love Song 1980"
3. "Mistake" 錯誤
4. "Foolish Waiting" (痴痴的等; chīchī de děng)
  Originally sung by Fang Cheng (方正) in the 1981 album Merrily Big Soldiers Album (Chinese: 歡樂大兵專輯, romanized: huānlè dà bīng zhuānjí) by Fang Cheng and Hsu Pu-liao (許不了)
5. "Zhi Hu Zhe Ye" 之乎者也
6. "Lukang Township" (鹿港小鎮)

Side B

1. "Nostalgia of Four Rhymes" (鄉愁四韻)
2. "Story of Time" (光陰的故事)
3. "I Shall Drink Wine" (將進酒)
4. "Deaf-Blind" (盲聾; máng lóng)
  Also heard in the 1982 album Leaders of Tomorrow (未來的主人翁)
5. "Lullaby" (催眠曲; cuīmiánqǔ)
  Alternative Chinese title of "Lullaby" (摇篮曲)
6. "Dandelion" (蒲公英)

== Reception ==
The book Taiwan Popular Music — 200 Best Albums (台灣流行音樂 200最佳專輯) (2009, enlarged from a 1994 list) by National Taiwan University (NTU) students and Ma Shih-fang (馬世芳), a radio DJ at News 98, ranked this album number one of their "top 20 Taiwan popular albums from 1975 to 1992".
