= TME Wave Chart =

Launched in November 2020, the TME Wave Chart is a monthly ranking of the top songs in China compiled based on scores and recommendations from more than 250 music industry professionals. The name, Wave (浪潮), symbolizes the new wave of music.

== Eligibility and ranking ==
Eligible songs include songs released by Chinese artists or songs in Chinese, with China as the main distribution region and regardless of which platform they are released on (different from the TME UNI Chart).

Ranking is determined in two stages: nomination and scoring.

- From the 1st of the previous month to the 7th of the current month, recommenders of the TME Wave Chart committee nominate and vote for the eligible songs released in the previous month. They then select 20 shortlisted songs based on the nomination votes.
- From the 8th to the 15th of the current month, recommenders of the TME Wave Chart committee conduct multi-dimensional evaluation and comprehensive scoring of the shortlisted songs. The songs are scored based on the following five categories, each worth ten points: lyrics, composition, arrangement, production, and vocals. The top 20 songs are then ranked based on the average of the five scoring categories.

The finalized ranking of songs is then released on the 20th of the current month.

== List of number-one songs ==
Year	Month	Song	Artist
2020	November	"The Search" 是但求其爱	Eason Chan
2020	December	"Xiao Juan" 小娟 (化名)	Tan Weiwei
2021	January	"What Remains" 余额	Stefanie Sun
2021	February	Have A Nice Day	Waa Wei
2021	March	"To Shed a Tear for You" 因一个人而流出一滴泪	Karen Mok
2021	April	"_5:15"	Guo Ding
2021	May	"Empty World" 这世界那么多人	Karen Mok
2021	June	"First Love" 初恋	Karen Mok
2021	July	"Depart" 出走	Tanya Chua
2021	August	"Unexpected Summer" 不期而遇的夏天	Eason Chan
2021	September	"A Song That Doesn't Exist in the World" 世界上不存在的歌	Eason Chan
2021	October	"Little Too Much" 蝴蝶	Tia Ray
2021	November	"Warrior of the Darkness" 孤勇者	Eason Chan
2021	December	"The Day Before" 世界终结前一天	Stefanie Sun
2022	January	"Another Kind of Answer" 另一种答案	Shan Yichun
2022	February	"It is the Hour" 现在是什么时辰了	Hebe Tien
2022	March	"Reborn" 脱胎换骨	Li Ronghao
2022	April	"Conversation" 聊聊天	A-Lin
2022	May	"Just Seeking Pain" 但求疼	Tan Weiwei
2022	June	"Thanks to You" 多亏你啊	Penny Tai
2022	July	"Greatest Works of Art" 最伟大的作品	Jay Chou
2022	August	"Maybe I Can Ignore Death" 也许我可以无视死亡	Wang Feng
2022	September	"Fair Winds on the Way Home" 归途有风	Faye Wong
2022	October	"Moon" 月	Yisa Yu
2022	November	"Homo Sapien" 人啊人	Eason Chan
2022	December	"First Light" 初光	Henry Lau/JVKE
2023	January	"It's Mom and Daughter" 是妈妈是女儿	Huang Qishan/Curley Gao
2023	February	"Another Decade" 又十年	Jacky Cheung
2023	March	"My Dearest" 最爱是谁	Leslie Cheung
2023	April	"Dust and Ashes" 愿与愁	JJ Lin
2023	May	"Daydream" 白日梦	No Party for Cao Dong
2023	June	"Love River" 爱河人间	Lo Ta-yu
2023	July	"Luocha Kingdom" 罗刹海市	Dao Lang
2023	August	"Please Delete Leo" 麻烦删掉狮子座	Jude Chiu
2023	September	Special One (feat. Eason Chan)	AGA/Eason Chan
2023	October	"Something Missing" 空城记	Eason Chan
2023	November	"River Flow" 如河	Tia Ray
2023	December	"Source of Life" 生命的源头	Lowell Lo/Jonathan Lee
2024	January	"Shining Star" 星心	David Tao
2024	February	"You Who I Lost" 被我弄丢的你	Karen Mok
2024	March	"Skinny Love" 瘦子	Dean Ting
2024	April	"Learn to Live Again" 善良的我们	Tanya Chua
2024	May	"Waving to the Sky" 向天空招手的人	Wang Feng
2024	June	"Her" 一身焰火去罗马	Karen Mok & The Masters
2024	July	"Lil Sis" 纯妹妹	Shan Yichun
2024	August	"Trapeze" 空中飞人	Leah Dou
2024	September	"Half and Half" 一半一半	GAI
2024	October	"Over and Again"	Karencici
2024	November	"Twin Flame" 双生火焰	Penny Tai
2024	December	"What Else is Better" 还有什么更好的	Shan Yichun
2025	January	"My Gifts from the World" 世界赠予我的	Faye Wong
2025	February	"I Can't Control Myself" 我管不住我自己	Shan Yichun
2025	March	"Stupid Pop Song"	David Tao
2025	April	"From Dust to Dust" 微塵	David Tao
2025	May	"Pearls and Jade" 珠玉	Shan Yichun
2025	June	"no full frontal" 用背脊唱情歌	Gareth.T
2025	July	"Performance Art" 行为艺术	Tang Hanxiao

== Artists by total number-one singles ==
The following artists achieved two or more number-one singles on the TME Wave Chart, some had number-one singles on their own as well as part of a collaboration.

Names are listed in alphabetical order.

Position	Artist	Total weeks at No. 1	Notes
1	Eason Chan	7	1 collaboration with AGA
2	Karen Mok	5	1 collaboration with The Masters
2	Shan Yichun	5	—
3	David Tao	3	—
4	Tanya Chua	2	—
4	Wang Feng	2	—
4	Tia Ray	2	—
4	Stefanie Sun	2	—
4	Penny Tai	2	—
4	Tan Weiwei	2	—
4	Faye Wong	2	—

== Year-end top 100 chart ==
List of number-one songs
Year	Song	Artist	Reference
2021	"Empty World"	Karen Mok	
2022	"Greatest Works of Art"	Jay Chou	
2023	"My Dearest"	Leslie Cheung	
2024	"Lil Sis"	Shan Yichun	
