= 1991 Jade Solid Gold Best Ten Music Awards Presentation =

Hong Kong music awards ceremony

The 1991 Jade Solid Gold Best Ten Music Awards Presentation (Chinese: 1991年度十大勁歌金曲頒獎典禮) was held in January 1992. It is part of the Jade Solid Gold Best Ten Music Awards Presentation series held in Hong Kong.

== Top 10 song awards ==
The top 10 songs (十大勁歌金曲) of 1991 are as follows.

Song name in Chinese	Artist(s)
每天愛妳多一些	Jacky Cheung
愛不完	Andy Lau
今夜你會不會來	Leon Lai
瘋了	Sandy Lam
一顆不變心	Jacky Cheung
不可不信緣	Andy Lau
Lonely	Grasshopper (Band members: Calvin Choy, Remus Choy, Edmond So)
信自己	Sally Yeh, Alex To
對不起我愛您	Leon Lai
一起走過的日子	Andy Lau

== Additional awards ==
Award	Song name (if available for award)	Recipient(s)
The Most Popular Mandarin Song Award (最受歡迎國語歌曲獎)
Gold award (tie)	夢醒時份	Sarah Chen
Gold award (tie)	愛上一個不回家的人	Sandy Lam
Silver award	我是不是該安靜的走開	Aaron Kwok
Bronze award	想念你	Harlem Yu
Best Composition Award (最佳作曲獎)	"Queen's Road East"	Music composers: Lo Ta Yu; Performed by: Lo Ta Yu, Ram Chiang
Best Lyrics Award (最佳填詞獎)	"Queen's Road East"	Lyrics by: Albert Leung; Performed by: Lo Ta Yu, Ram Chiang
Best Music Arrangement Award (最佳編曲獎)	頂天立地	Tai Chi (Band members: Albert Lui, Patrick Lui, Joey Tang, Ernest Lau, Edde Sing, Ricky Chu, Gary Tong)
Best Production Award (最佳歌曲監製獎)	每天愛你多一些	Music producer: Michael Au; Performed by: Jacky Cheung
Best Music Video Award ( 最佳音樂錄影帶獎 )	再生戀	Director: 曾憲宗; Performed by: Sandy Lam
The Most Popular New Artist Award (最受歡迎新人獎)
Gold award	---	Canti Lau
Silver award	---	Rita Carpio
Bronze award	---	Stephaine Lai (黎明诗)
The Best Music Video Performance Award (最佳音樂錄影帶演出獎)	信自己	Sally Yeh, Alex To
The Most Popular Male Artist Award (最受歡迎男歌星獎)	---	Andy Lau
The Most Popular Female Artist Award (最受歡迎女歌星獎)	---	Sally Yeh
Gold Song Gold Award (金曲金獎)	每天愛你多一些	Jacky Cheung
Jade Solid Gold Honour Award ( 金曲銀禧榮譽大獎 )	---	Alan Tam
