= Evening Post =

Evening Post or The Evening Post may refer to the following newspapers:

== United Kingdom ==
- Evening Post (London) (1710–1732), then Berington's Evening Post (1732–1740)
- London Evening Post (1727–1797)
- Whitehall Evening Post (1718–1801), London
- Bristol Evening Post (1932–2012), renamed the Bristol Post
- Jersey Evening Post (founded 1890)
- Lancashire Evening Post (founded 1886)
- Nottingham Evening Post (founded 1878), now the Nottingham Post
- Reading Evening Post, name changed to the Reading Post in 2009
- South Wales Evening Post, name changed in 1932 from the original South Wales Daily Post
- Wigan Evening Post, formerly Wigan Evening Post and Chronicle, now Wigan Post
- Yorkshire Evening Post (founded 1890), Leeds, West Yorkshire

== United States ==
- Boston Evening-Post (1735–1775)
- The Evening Post (1894–1991), now part of The Post and Courier, Charleston, South Carolina
- The Evening Post (1938–1948), now part of Telegram & Gazette, Worcester, Massachusetts
- Chicago Evening Post (1865–1875) – see Newspapers of the Chicago metropolitan area
- Chicago Evening Post (1886–1932)
- Evening Post (1892–1893), then the Denver Evening Post (1895–1900), now The Denver Post
- Memphis Evening Post (1868–1869), previous name of the Memphis Post
- New-York Evening Post (1801–1934), now the New York Post
- The (Cincinnati) Evening Post (1883–1890), later The Cincinnati Post
- The (Louisville) Evening Post, which was merged with the Louisville Herald to become the Louisville Herald-Post

== Elsewhere ==
- The Evening Post (New Zealand) (1865–2002)
- Independence Evening Post, Taiwan (1947–2001)
- Regina Evening Post, merged with The Leader to form the Leader-Post, Regina, Saskatchewan, Canada
- Yangtse Evening Post, China
- Evening Post (Port Elizabeth), South Africa

== See also ==
- The Saturday Evening Post, an American magazine
- Shanghai Evening Post & Mercury, a defunct Chinese newspaper
- New Evening Post (1950–1997), Hong Kong
- Aftenposten (Norwegian for The Evening Post), Norway's largest newspaper
- Goulburn Evening Penny Post (1870–1957), Goulburn, New South Wales, Australia
- The Post (disambiguation)

Swansea Evening Post
