= Huangshan Morning Post =

Chinese newspaper

- Type: Morning newspaper
- Owner: Huangshan Daily
- Founded: 28 December 2004
- Website: cnepaper.com/hsck/

The Huangshan Morning Post (Chinese: 黄山晨刊), whose full name was Huangshan Daily - Huangshan Morning Post (黄山日报·黄山晨刊), was a Huangshan City-based Chinese-language morning newspaper published in China. The Post was founded on 28 December 2004, and officially launched on 1 January 2005.

== Profile & History ==
The Huangshan Morning Post was a sub-publication of Huangshan Daily (黄山日报). On 29 December 2018, Huangshan Morning Post stopped publication.
