= Baise Morning Post =

- Type: Daily newspaper
- Founded: December 11, 2009
- Ceased publication: January 1, 2020
- Headquarters: Baise
- Website: Baise Morning Post

The Baise Morning Post (Chinese: 百色早报) was a Baise-based Chinese-language metropolitan newspaper published in China. The newspaper was officially introduced on December 11, 2009, by Youjiang Daily Agency (右江日报社) in Baise, Guangxi.

Baise Morning Post was a sub-paper of the Youjiang Daily (右江日报) and a municipal-level news media organization.

== History ==
Baise Morning Post was founded on December 11, 2009, to commemorate the 80th anniversary of the Baise Uprising led and launched by Deng Xiaoping.

At the end of 2019, the newspaper announced that it would cease publication on January 1, 2020.
