= Rock 'n' Roll on the New Long March =

Rock 'N' Roll on the New Long March

Studio album by Cui Jian & ADO
- Released: February 1989
- Genre: Art rock • new wave • folk rock • jazz rock
- Label: China Tourism Sound and Video Publishing Company
- Producer: Cui Jian

Cui Jian chronology
Return of the Prodigal (1984)	Rock 'N' Roll on the New Long March (1989)	Solution (1991)

ADO studio album chronology
Rock 'N' Roll on the New Long March' (1989)	I Just Can't Say It Casually (1996)

Rock 'N' Roll on the New Long March (Chinese: 新长征路上的摇滚; pinyin: xīn chángzhènglù shàng de yáogǔn) is a 1989 album by Cui Jian, the so-called "Father of Chinese Rock". It is technically his second album as an album called Return of the Prodigal was released in 1984 in Hong Kong and Taiwan only, but he considers it his first and does not acknowledge the previous one. It is Cui's most successful album, and is considered China's first rock album. It also features "Nothing to My Name", the song that made Cui famous and which is considered to mark the beginning of rock music in China. Cui made the album in cooperation with the band ADO, and it was the only album he released while he was still with them.

The Long March (1934–1935) is regarded as one of the most glorious episodes in the Communist revolutionary history. The ending of the Cultural Revolution led to the leftist value system collapsing. The term "Long March" in the text is a metaphor for the "new Long March" of searching for one’s own identity in the fast changing society.

== Versions ==
An almost identical album called Nothing to My Name was released in Hong Kong and Taiwan the same year; it did not include the song "Rock 'N' Roll on the New Long March". In 1999 a second edition of the album was released, by Beijing-based Jingwen Records, to mark its tenth anniversary.

== Reception ==
In a review published in China Information, Woei Lin Chong considers it Cui's "most impressive recording". This album, along with the success already enjoyed by "Nothing to My Name", established Cui as a symbol of the "angry youth" movement in China.

== Track listing ==
All tracks are written by Cui Jian.

No.	Title	Length
1.	"Rock 'N' Roll on the New Long March" (新长征路上的摇滚)	4:45
2.	"No More Disguises" (不再掩饰)	5:10
3.	"Let Me Sleep" (让我睡个好觉)	3:56
4.	"Greenhouse Girl" (花房姑娘)	4:54
5.	"Fake Monk" (假行僧)	4:59
6.	"Do It All Over Again" (从头再来)	5:17
7.	"Stepping Out" (出走)	5:29
8.	"Nothing to My Name" (一无所有)	5:43
9.	"It's Not That I Don't Understand" (不是我不明白)	5:11

== Personnel ==
- Cui Jian – lead vocals, rhythm guitar

=== ADO ===
- Eddie Randriamampionona (艾迪) – lead guitar
- Kassai Balazs (巴拉什) – bass
- Zhang Yongguang (张永光) – drums
- Liu Yuan (刘元) – saxophone, suona, flute

=== Additional musicians ===
- Liu Xiaosong (刘效松) – percussion
- Zhuang Biao (庄飚) – keyboards
- Wang Yong (王勇) – guzheng
