= Correio da Manhã =

Correio da Manhã may refer to one of the following newspapers:

- Correio da Manhã (Brazil)
- Correio da Manhã (Portugal)
