= Daily Post =

Daily Post or The Daily Post may refer to the following newspapers:

== India ==
- Daily Post India, founded in 2011

== Nigeria ==
- Daily Post (Nigeria), founded in 2015

== South Pacific ==
- Fiji's Daily Post (1987–2010)
- Guam Daily Post, founded in 2004
- Daily Post (Hobart) (1908–1918)
- Rotorua Daily Post, founded in 1885
- Vanuatu Daily Post, founded in 1993

== United Kingdom ==
- South Wales Daily Post, former name of the South Wales Evening Post, Swansea, Wales
- Daily Post (London newspaper), founded in 1719
- Liverpool Daily Post (1855–2013)
  - Daily Post (North Wales), split off from the Liverpool Daily Post in 2003
- Birmingham Daily Post, founded in 1857 (now the Birmingham Post)

== United States ==
- Bay Daily Post, formerly the San Francisco Daily, a free newspaper founded in 2006
- Gwinnett Daily Post, published in Gwinnett County, Georgia since 1995
- Palo Alto Daily Post

== See also ==
- The Post (disambiguation)
