= Returning Wanderer =

Return of the Prodigal

Studio album / Live album by Cui Jian
- Released: 1984
- Genre: Chinese rock

Cui Jian chronology
Return of the Prodigal (1984)	Rock 'n' Roll on the New Long March (1989)

Liangzi gui (浪子歸, in English variously known as Returning Wanderer) was Cui Jian's first album in 1984. It originally circulated as a cassette, then was released in Hong Kong and Taiwan only. Cui regarded the CD as a collection of demos and performances, not as his first album. In 2009 the tracks from the Hong Kong release were reissued in Beijing with other early recordings, indicating "The sound of Cui Jian in 1986" on the cover, as a CD.

The title song, "Returning Wanderer," describes the feelings and situations of a generation of young people who had been sent to the country during the Cultural Revolution, alienated from their families, and returned to the city.
