= Morning Post Weekly =

Chinese magazine

- First issue: December 2007
- Final issue: 1 January 2018
- Based in: Changsha
- Language: Chinese
- Website: Morning Post Weekly

The Morning Post Weekly (Chinese: 晨报周刊), also known as Chenbao Zhoukan was a Chinese-language magazine founded by the Xiaoxiang Morning Post Agency in December 2007 in Changsha, Hunan. The magazine officially ceased publication on 1 January 2018.

== History ==
Morning Post Weekly was established in December 2007. It was revamped in April 2013, after which the newspaper was issued for 14 prefectures in the whole Hunan Province.

In October 2017, Morning Post Weekly conducted an interview with French sinologist Michel Bonnin. He said that the Chinese should not distort the facts of "Down to the Countryside Movement" because of nostalgia. He believed that "Down to the Countryside Movement" (especially after 1968) was a political movement mainly initiated by Mao Zedong. He argued that the context and image of the movement at that time were completely shrouded by the official propaganda of the Chinese Government, and no other context could emerge.
