= Liu Yuan (musician) =

Chinese musician (1960–2024)

- Simplified Chinese: 刘元
- Traditional Chinese: 劉元
Transcriptions
Standard Mandarin
- Hanyu Pinyin: Liú Yuán

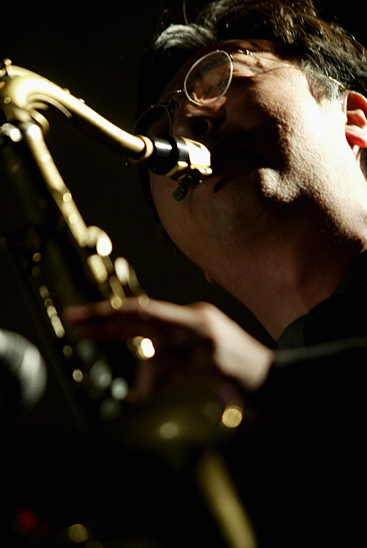
Photo by SHEN Bohan

Liu Yuan (Chinese: 劉元; pinyin: Liú Yuán, pronounced [ljǒʊ yǎn]; January 1, 1960 – December 22, 2024) was a Chinese musician, who played tenor and baritone saxophone as well as the Chinese wind instrument called suona. According to Encyclopedia of Contemporary Chinese Culture, Liu was the most influential modern Chinese jazz musician.

== Life and career ==
His father was a player of the suona, a traditional Chinese wind instrument, and this was also Liu's first instrument. At about the age of eight, he began his performing career, playing in a government-run children's musical group.

He continued his suona studies at the Beijing Art School, graduating at age 19, at which time he entered a danwei (work unit) called the Beijing Song and Dance Troupe. With this group, Liu had the opportunity to travel, both inside and outside of China.

In 1978 and 1980, the troupe toured Europe, performing in Romania, France, Switzerland, and other nations. While in Romania, in a city near the Hungarian border, Liu and some friends went to a cafe where they heard jazz performed live for the first time:

"There was a music group that performed," he recalled, "in a cafe where we went to eat one night. It was jazz. They had a sax, and things like that, and it was jazz. And we said..." Liu sucks in his breath at the memory. "...aiyo!"

Liu became enamored of this form of music, and, in particular, the saxophone. In 1984, he was able to purchase a saxophone and, over time, gradually acquired skill playing jazz. Jazz recordings were scarce, and at first he had only a single tape, by Grover Washington, Jr., to study.

Also in the 1980s, he was a founding member of ADO, the backing band for China's first rock star, Cui Jian (a fellow performer in the Beijing Song and Dance Troupe), for which he also acquired fame. He also contributed an instrumental piece to the 1992 Taiwanese movie Dust of Angels soundtrack.

Liu favored the tenor and baritone saxophone as his primary instruments, though he also used a modernized version of the suona for some songs in Cui Jian's band, in which he still performed. He made use of a modernized large-keyed suona in the 1985 song "Nothing to My Name" (一无所有; pinyin: Yì Wú Suǒ Yǒu), as well as on Cui's 1994 album Balls under the Red Flag (Hongxi xia de Dang).

In May 1999, Liu became the manager of a jazz club called CD Cafe (or CD Jazz Cafe) in his home city of Beijing, where he performed regularly with his Liu Yuan Jazz Quartet. He began performing at the Cafe in the mid-1990s, when public performances by Cui Jian's group were effectively banned. Weekend jam sessions by the quartet frequently ran until 3 am or later. His quartet included a talented jazz drummer from Japan, who was an alumnus of the Berklee School of Music.

In 2006, Liu partnered with childhood friend Li Yongxian to open the East Shore Jazz Cafe, a jazz bar in Beijing's Houhai district. The venue plays host to jazz artists from around China and abroad, and he still performed there himself on weekend nights.

Liu's given name is frequently pronounced "Yuar" (the Beijing dialect pronunciation of "Yuan"). He is an adherent of Buddhism.

Liu died from cancer in Beijing, on December 22, 2024, at the age of 64.
