= Tianfu Morning Post =

Chinese-language metropolitan newspaper published in China

- Type: Daily newspaper
- Founded: June 1, 1999
- Headquarters: Chengdu
- Website: morning.scol.com.cn www.morning.sc.cn

The Tianfu Morning Post (Chinese: 天府早报), or Tianfu Zaobao, also known as Tianfu Morning News, was a Chengdu-based Chinese-language metropolitan newspaper published in China.

Tianfu Morning Post was founded on June 1, 1999. On January 1, 2020, it ceased publication.
