= Chongqing Morning Post =

Chinese newspaper

- Type: Daily newspaper
- Founded: 28 April 1995
- Language: Chinese
- Headquarters: Chongqing
- OCLC number: 868916619
- Website: www.cqcb.com

Chongqing Morning Post
- Traditional Chinese: 重慶晨報
- Simplified Chinese: 重庆晨报
Transcriptions
Standard Mandarin
- Hanyu Pinyin: Chòngqìng Chénbào

The Chongqing Morning Post (simplified Chinese: 重庆晨报; traditional Chinese: 重慶晨報; pinyin: Chòngqìng Chénbào), also known as Chongqing Morning News or Chongqing Chenbao, is a Chinese-language newspaper published in Chongqing, China.

Chongqing Morning Post is the first morning newspaper in Chongqing, which was sponsored by the Chongqing Daily Newspaper Group (重庆日报报业集团) and is supervised by the Propaganda Department of the Chongqing Municipal Committee of the Chinese Communist Party.

Chongqing Morning Post was officially inaugurated on 28 April 1995, and its predecessor was Chongqing Daily: Rural Edition (重庆日报·农村版), which was founded in 1983, and was renamed Chongqing Rural Post (重庆农村报) on 1 October 1986, ceased publication in 1994, and was renamed Chongqing Morning Post on 28 April 1995.

Chongqing Morning Post has a special section in Singapore's Lianhe Zaobao.

== Criticisms and controversies ==
On 26 November 2006, Wolfgang Kubin, a German sinologist, was interviewed by the Deutsche Welle and gave his views on Chinese contemporary literature, Chinese writers, and some specific writers and works, including some criticisms and opinions. However, a month later, this interview was partially reproduced by Chongqing Morning Post, and Kubin's criticism of individual writers and his opinions on Chinese contemporary literature became A German sinologist calls Chinese contemporary literature rubbish (德国汉学家称中国当代文学是垃圾), and was reproduced by major media in Mainland China, which caused great repercussions and was called "Kubin Incident" (顾彬事件).

In response to the report of Chongqing Morning Post, Kubin said it misrepresented his words. On the other hand, People's Daily accused Chongqing Morning Post of creating "fake news". Kubin never said that contemporary Chinese literature is all rubbish, but Chongqing Morning Post said so for the sake of sensational effect. The phenomenon of creating fake news "must not be left to nothing."
