= Nothing to My Name =

1986 song performed by Cui Jian

"一无所有 (Nothing to My Name)"
- Cover artwork from the overseas release of the album Nothing to My Name

Single by Cui Jian

from the album Rock 'N' Roll on the New Long March
- Language: Mandarin
- Released: 1986
- Genre: Rock and roll
- Length: 5:35
- Songwriter: Cui Jian

"Nothing to My Name" (Note: also referred to as "I Have Nothing" in English, among other translations) (Chinese: 一无所有; pinyin: Yī wú suǒ yǒu) is a song by Chinese rock musician Cui Jian. It is widely considered Cui's most famous and most important work, and one of the most influential songs in the history of the People's Republic of China, both as a seminal point in the development of Chinese rock music and as a political sensation. The song was an unofficial anthem for Chinese youth and activists during the 1989 Tiananmen Square protests and massacre.

Both in its lyrics and instruments, the song mixes traditional Chinese styles with modern rock elements. In the lyrics, the speaker addresses a girl who is scorning him because he has nothing. However, the song has also been interpreted as being about the dispossessed youth of the time, because it evokes a sense of disillusionment and lack of individual freedom that was common among the young generation during the 1980s.

== Historical context ==
By the late 1970s, Western rock music was gaining popularity in mainland China. After the Cultural Revolution ended in the mid-1970s and the government began a period of reform and opening up, many students and businessmen went abroad and brought back Western music. Chinese singers began performing covers of popular Western rock songs.

At the same time, Chinese society and the Chinese government were quickly abandoning Maoism, and promoting economic policies that had a more capitalist orientation. Many Chinese teens and students were becoming disillusioned with their government, which they felt had abandoned its ideals. Because of the rapid economic changes, many of them felt that they had no opportunities and no individual freedom. These developments formed the background against which "Nothing to My Name" appeared in 1986.

== Music and lyrics ==
=== Musical style ===
Cui Jian was heavily influenced by Western artists such as Bob Dylan, the Beatles, the Rolling Stones, and Talking Heads; in the late 1980s he even performed with a hair style modeled on that of John Lennon. In "Nothing to My Name" and other songs, he intentionally altered the sounds of traditional Chinese musical instruments by mixing them with elements of rock music, especially the arrangement of the suona solo—rather than electric guitar—in the ritornello played by Liu Yuan. He also purposely divorced his musical style from that of the revolutionary songs and proletarian operas that were common under Chairman Mao Zedong during the Cultural Revolution—for example, he performed his music very loud, as high as 150 decibels, just because Mao had considered loud music disruptive to the social order.

In genre, the song is often called the first work of Xibeifeng, a 1980s music style originating from Northwest China, based on traditional Shaanbei folk music. Cui himself, however, considers the song pure rock and roll.

=== Lyrics and meaning ===
"Nothing to My Name"
Sample of the first verse and chorus of "Nothing to My Name", demonstrating the lyrics and the mixing of traditional Chinese instruments with rock elements.

Interpretations of the song's meaning vary from one listener to the next; some people view it as a song about love and desire, while others understand it as a political metaphor, the lyrics being addressed as much to the Chinese nation as to a girlfriend. Ethnomusicologist Timothy Brace has described this common analysis of the song lyrics as "recast[ing] the setting of this piece from that of a boy talking to his girlfriend to that of a youthful generation talking to the nation as a whole." The ambiguity is heightened by the structure of the title 一无所有 (yī wú suŏ yŏu), an idiomatic chengyu. It literally means "to have nothing" and has no grammatical subject. Therefore, it can be interpreted as meaning "I have nothing" (implying that it is a song about two people), or "we have nothing" (understanding it as social commentary). Moreover, the first person pronoun 我, as used in the lyrics, can refer to either "I" or "we".

The narrator of the song worries that the girl he is addressing will ignore him because he has nothing to give her; likewise, the song's audience in the 1980s—young students and workers—were also suffering from not having resources to marry, to be with their girlfriends and boyfriends, or to attract members of the opposite sex. The lyrics also express Western concepts of individualism, and were some of the first popular song lyrics in China to promote self-expression and self-empowerment. This put the song in stark contrast with older music, which had emphasized conformity and obedience. As the narrator, later on in the song, confidently proclaims to the girl that he will "grab her hands" ("我要抓起你的双手") and then she will go with him ("你这就跟我走"), he suggests in the end that she can love the fact that he has nothing ("莫非你是正在告诉我/你爱我一无所有"). On one level, this suggests that the song is about "love conquering all", but the line has also been interpreted as threatening, and suggestive of an unorthodox and "Dionysian" mix of love and aggression.

Understood as social commentary, the substitution of "we" along with the replacement of every "you" with the Communist Party, means the song becomes an ironic response to the Chinese lyrics of "The Internationale":

Slaves rise up, rise up!

We cannot say that we have nothing [一无所有; yīwúsuŏyŏu]

We will be masters of all under heavens.

— The Internationale

== Cultural and societal impact ==
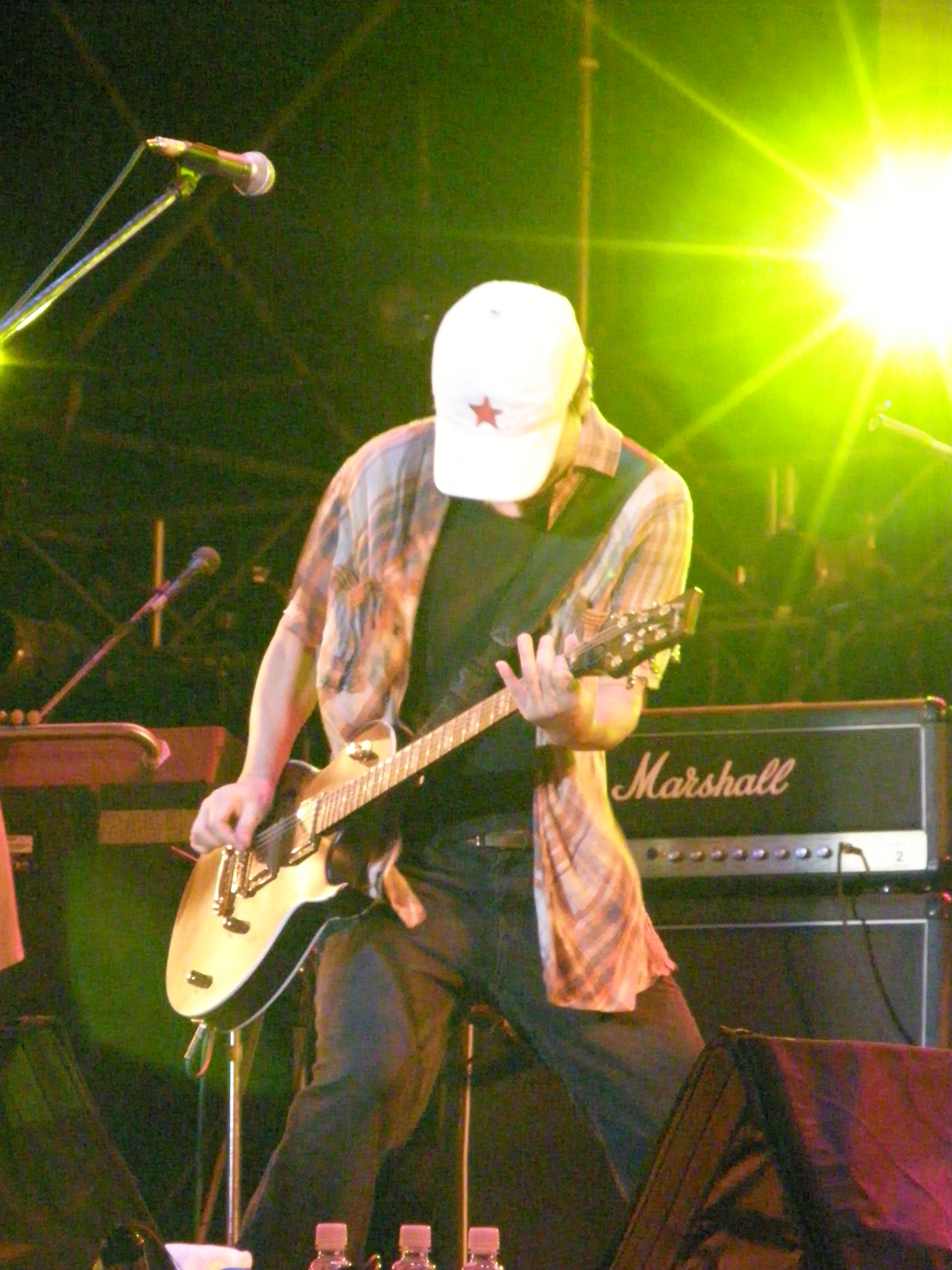
Cui Jian

Cui wrote "Nothing to My Name" himself and first performed it on a televised music competition on 9 May 1986, with his band ADO. The song was an instant success, creating a "sensation" and turning Cui into a cult figure among urban youth. It was one of the first examples of Chinese, as opposed to imported, rock and roll music to gain popularity in China. The newspaper of the Central Committee of the Chinese Communist Party, People's Daily, gave the song a positive review, despite its politically sensitive message. The song was included on Cui's 1989 album Rock 'n' Roll on the New Long March, released by the China Tourism Sound and Video Publishing Company. (The version of the album released overseas was called Nothing to My Name.) By 1989, it had become a "battle song" or "anthem" among the youth movement.

Cui performed the song live at the Tiananmen Square protests of 1989. The performances by Cui and other rock artists during the protests have been described as "a revolutionary few days that rocked a nation," and many protesters sang "Nothing to My Name" to give voice to their rebellion against the government, and their desire for personal freedom and self-expression. Brace describes how, during Cui's Tiananmen performance, students "jumped to their feet and began to sing," a practice that had rarely happened at music performances in China before then. Not long after Tiananmen, Cui was restricted to playing in small venues; he did not play before a large audience in Beijing again until 2005.

An English-language translation of the song was included in the 2016 anthology The Big Red Book of Modern Chinese Literature alongside contemporary poetry and short stories by prominent Chinese authors.

Cui has become known as the "Father of Chinese Rock", and "Nothing to My Name" has become his most famous song. It has been described as "the biggest hit in Chinese history" and the beginning of Chinese rock.
