= Lo Ta-yu =

Taiwanese singer and songwriter

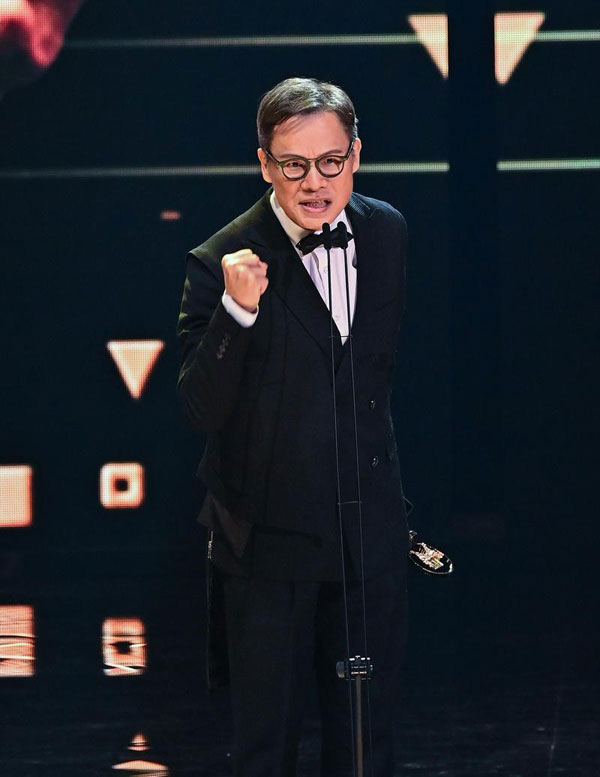
- Lo in 2021
- Born: 20 July 1954 (age 72); Taipei, Taiwan
- Occupations: Singer, songwriter
- Years active: 1974–present
- Spouses: Lee Lieh (m. 1999; div. 2001) Elaine Lee (m. 2010)
- Partner: Sylvia Chang (1976-1985)
- Children: 1
- Awards: Hong Kong Film Awards – Best Original Film Score; 1990 Eight Taels of Gold; 1992 The Twin Bracelets; 1993 The Heroic Trio Golden Horse Awards – Best Original Score; 1990 Red Dust 32nd Golden Melody Awards – Special Contribution Award; 2021

Chinese name
- Traditional Chinese: 羅大佑
- Simplified Chinese: 罗大佑
Transcriptions
Standard Mandarin
- Hanyu Pinyin: Luó Dàyòu
Yue: Cantonese
- Jyutping: Lo4 Daai6-jau6
Southern Min
- Hokkien POJ: Lô Tāi-iū
- Musical career
- Also known as: Luo Dayou, Law Tai-yau
- Genres: Rock, Mandopop, Folk, Blues, Reggae
- Instruments: Vocals; guitar; keyboards; bass; accordion
- Label: Rock Records
- Website: www.luodayou.net

Lo Ta-yu (Chinese: 羅大佑; pinyin: Luó Dàyòu; born 20 July 1954), also known as Luo Dayou and Law Tai-yau, is a Taiwanese singer and songwriter. During the 1980s, Lo became one of the most influential Mandopop singer-songwriters with his melodic lyrics and love songs, and his witty social and political commentary that he infused in his more political songs, often to the point that some of his songs were suppressed in Taiwan and Mainland China during the 1980s. He is recognized as a cultural icon in Taiwan, Hong Kong, and Mainland China.

Stylistically, Lo defies classification, though his contribution to the Taiwan campus folk song genre was most significant. His early music in particular shows strong folk roots, and many of his songs tap into native Taiwanese cultural influences. Some songs are reminiscent of 1950s American diner and soda shop rock, and others exhibit a 1970s lounge lizard growl. What captured the hearts of a generation, however, were his lyrics, touching on issues of life, attitudes, social responsibility, and the political problems of both China and Taiwan with an underhandedly critical strain of dark humor. The lyrical style is not particularly artsy or complex, but rather conversational; the cleverness comes in the meaning, not how the words are put together.

== Life and career ==
Lo was born in Taipei on 20 July 1954 to an upper-class family. He complied with his family's wishes to finish medical school by graduating from the China Medical College in Taichung, but decided to abandon a career as a physician to pursue a singing and songwriting career. Lo debuted in the music industry in 1977, composing part of the soundtrack of the film Golden Days (閃亮的日子) and writing songs for his partner Sylvia Chang's album Childhood (童年).

In 1982, Lo released his debut album Pedantry (Chinese: 之乎者也; pinyin: Zhī hū zhě yě), the title of which consists solely of grammatical particles from Classical Chinese. The album, focusing on satirizing and criticizing modern Taiwanese life with a mix of rock, folk and reggae, is considered one of the most influential Taiwanese albums. The title song, Lukang, the Little Town (鹿港小鎮), the ironic Love Song 1980 (戀曲1980), and Childhood (童年) all became hits. Singing songs infused with brazen commentary on the social scene of Taiwan at that time and sporting sunglasses, his debut sparked buzz and heated discussion about the issues that his songs raised in Taiwan, such as Confucian pedantry and urban emptiness.

He followed with his next album in 1983, Master of the Future (未來的主人翁), which features several songs: the title song which warns the listener of a future run by children without morals or humanity and 72 Transformations (現象七十二變), and Orphan of Asia (亞細亞的孤兒) which shares its title with Wu Zhuoliu's novel about the Japanese occupation of Taiwan.

In 1985, inspired by the success of the charity single We Are the World by USA for Africa, Lo wrote Tomorrow Will Be Better (明天會更好), a highly successful charity single of his own to celebrate the 40th anniversary of Taiwan's independence from Japanese colonial rule. It was ultimately performed by over 60 different artists from Taiwan, Hong Kong, Singapore, and Malaysia, including Tsai Chin, Chyi Chin, Chyi Yu, Sarah Chen, Eric Moo, Fei Yu-Ching, Angus Tung, and Jonathan Lee.

Lo fled Taiwan and political pressure on his artistic expression. After a year in New York, he moved to Hong Kong in 1986.

Lover/Comrade (愛人同志) was Lo's next album, released in 1988. In addition to the title song which uses political slogans in the context of a love song, the album also included Love Song 1990 (戀曲1990), one of his most famous love songs that was written 6 years after he had written Love Song 1980.

In 1991, he wrote Pearl of the Orient (東方之珠), regarded as one of his most famous songs which sings praises to Hong Kong as a symbolic haven from the perils of the Pacific and implores Hong Kong not to lose its Chinese identity in the face of rapid modernization and British colonization at that time. In 2021, during the 100th anniversary of the Chinese Communist Party, Pearl of the Orient was acknowledged as a significant patriotic song. He also wrote "Queen's Road East" (皇后大道東), a 1991 Cantonese song he sang with Ram Chiang that satirizes the impending Hong Kong handover in 1997.

In 2004, Lo formally relinquished his US citizenship to protest the introduction of a resolution to the US House of Representatives requesting the deployment of Taiwanese marines to Iraq. "[W]hen US representatives introduced a resolution requesting that Taiwan send marines to Iraq, I realized that while the US often stresses peaceful negotiations across the Taiwan Strait, the US government is the third party that stands in the way of truly peaceful negotiation," Lo said.

On Sunday, 25 May 2008, at 7 pm PST, Lo held a live concert at San Jose State University Event Center. The concert, entitled "Join 'N Sing", was a celebration of the newly elected president of Taiwan, Ma Ying-jeou. There were three special guests at this show: Kao Ling Fung, Hsu Nai Ling, and Cindi Chaw Yong Hua. This show turned into a charity fundraiser for the earthquake victims of Sichuan, China.

== Discography ==
- Zhi Hu Zhe Ye 之乎者也 (1982)
- Master of the Future 未來的主人翁 (1983)
- Home 家 (1984)
- Pearl of the Orient 東方之珠 (1986/1991)
- Youth Movement 青春舞曲 (1986)
- Lover-Comrade 愛人同志 (1988)
- Brilliant Days 閃亮的日子 (1989)
- The Year to Say Farewell 告別的年代 (1989)
- Queen's Road East 皇后大道東 (1991)
- Hometown 原鄉 (1991)
- Capital 首都 (1992)
- Love Song 2000 戀曲二〇〇〇 (1994)
- 再會吧！素蘭 (Zài huì ba! Sù lán) (1995)
- 寶島鹹酸甜 (Bǎodǎo xián suān tián) (1996)
- 昨日遗书 (Zuórì yì shū) (2002)
- Beautiful Island 美麗島 (2004)
- Home lll 家lll (2017)
- Encore 安可曲 (2022)
