= Wang Feng discography =

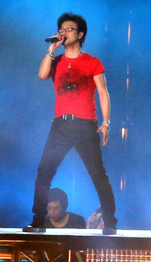
- Wang in 2015
- Studio albums: 12
- Live albums: 5
- Soundtracks: 2

The discography of Chinese recording artist Wang Feng consists of twelve studio albums, five live albums and two soundtracks.

== Studio albums ==
| Title | Album details | Peak chart positions |
| Title | Album details | CHN |
|---|---|---|
| Fireworks (花火) | Released: October 10, 2000 (CHN); July 11, 2001 (TWN); Label: Warner Music; Formats: CD, VCD, digital download | — |
| Love is a Happy Bullet (爱是一颗幸福的子弹) | Released: October 10, 2002; Label: Warner Music; Formats: CD, digital download | — |
| Crying with Laughter (笑着哭) | Released: May 5, 2004; Label: Warner Music; Formats: CD, digital download | — |
| A Blooming Life (怒放的生命) | Released: December 28, 2005; Label: Chuang Meng Music; Formats: CD, digital download | — |
| Brave Heart (勇敢的心) | Released: June 26, 2007; Label: Music Nation Group; Formats: CD, digital download | — |
| Belief Flies in the Wind (信仰在空中飘扬) | Released: July 25, 2009; Label: Music Nation Group; Formats: CD, digital download | 9 |
| Life Asks for Nothing (生无所求) | Released: November 16, 2011; Label: Rock Forward Entertainment; Formats: CD, digital download | 5 |
| Born in Hesitation (生来彷徨) | Released: December 2, 2013; Label: Rock Forward Entertainment; Formats: CD, digital download | 1 |
| The River (河流) | Released: November 18, 2015; Label: Shanghai Bifeng Yizhu Media; Formats: CD, digital download | — |
| 29, Guoling Lane (果岭里29号) | Released: December 8, 2017; Label: With Faith Music; Formats: CD, digital download | — |
| 2020 | Released: December 18, 2019; Label: With Faith Music; Formats: CD, digital download | — |
| Maybe I Can Ignore Death (也许我可以无视死亡) | Released: August 24, 2022; Label: With Faith Music; Formats: CD, digital download | — |

== Live albums ==
| Title | Album details |
|---|---|
| 2004 Fly Higher Concert Live in Beijing | Released: February 22, 2005; Label: Warner Records; Formats: CD, VCD, DVD |
| 2006 Super Live in Beijing | Released: January 25, 2008; Label: Chuang Meng Music; Formats: VCD, DVD |
| 2010 Shouting Faith Concert | Released: 2010; Label: Music Nation Group; Formats: DVD |
| 2011 Nothing For Life in Beijing | Released: September 1, 2012; Label: Starsing Music; Formats: DVD |
| 2013 Existence·Super Tour in Shanghai | Released: February 3, 2015; Label: Starsing Music; Formats: DVD |

== Soundtrack appearances ==
| Title | Year |
|---|---|
| "Beijing Bicycle" (十七岁的单车) | 2001 |
| "Wolf Totem" (沧浪之歌) | 2015 |
