= Ferlyn Wong =

Singaporean singer and actress (born 1992)

Ferlyn G Wong
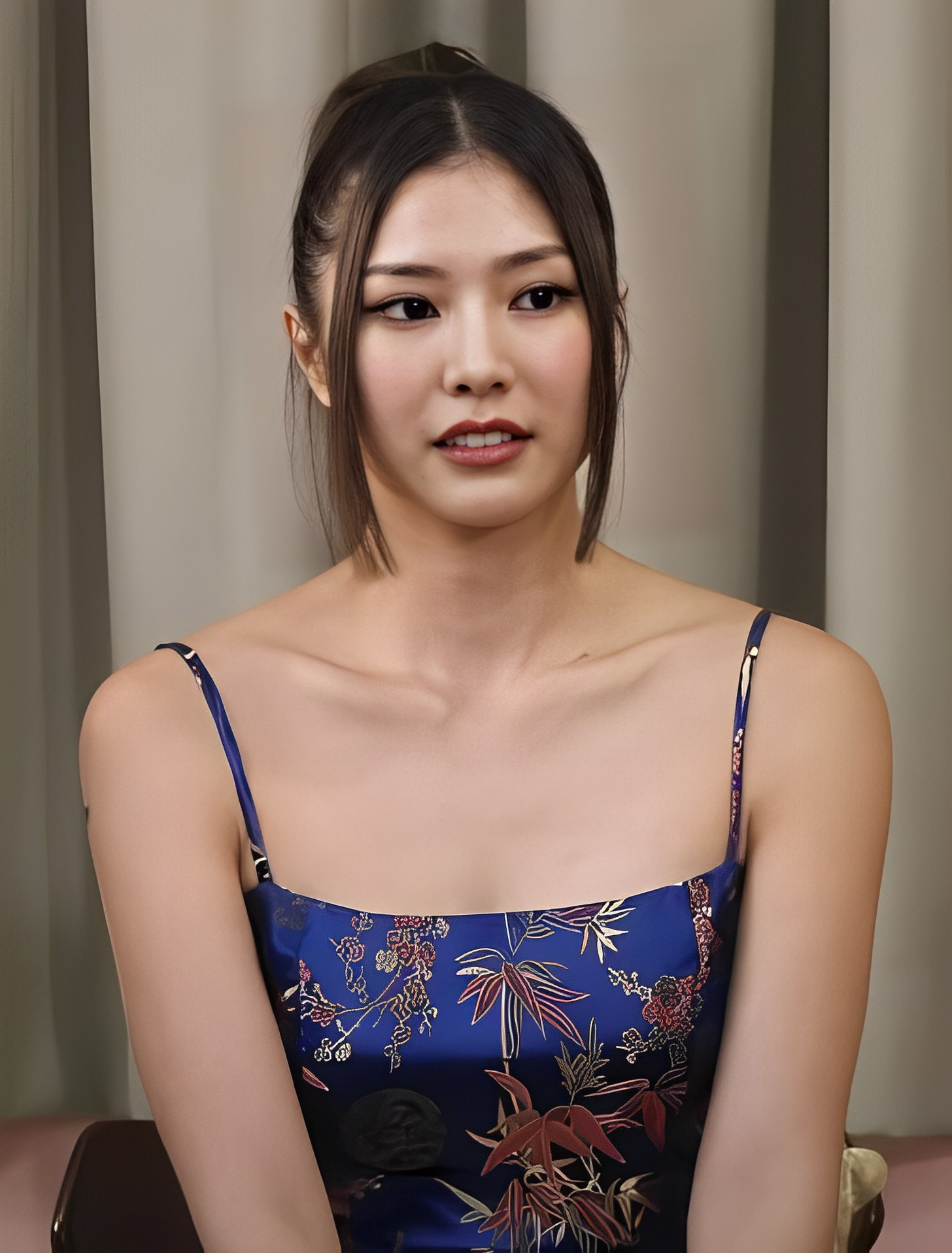
- Wong in a Wah!Banana skit in January 2022
- Born: Ferlyn Gilleen Wong Jing Ling; 1 February 1992 (age 34); Singapore
- Other name: Ferlyn G
- Education: Temasek Polytechnic
- Occupations: Singer; actress; model; dancer
- Musical career
- Genres: K-pop; Mandopop; dance
- Instruments: Vocals
- Years active: 2012–present
- Labels: CJ E&M; Alpha Entertainment; GIF Music
- Formerly of: Skarf

Chinese name
- Simplified Chinese: 黄晶玲
- Hanyu Pinyin: Huáng Jīnglíng

Korean name
- Hangul: 페린

Ferlyn Gilleen Wong Jing Ling, known professionally as Ferlyn G, is a Singaporean actress, singer, dancer, and model. She gained prominence as a member of the K-pop girl group Skarf from 2012 to 2014.

After leaving Skarf, Wong released her debut solo EP, First, on 2 January 2015. She also went into acting, in both feature films such as the 2019 comedy-horror When Ghost Meets Zombie and television dramas, sych as Kin, I Do, Do I? and Emerald Hill - The Little Nyonya Story.

== Early life and education ==
Born on 1 February 1992, Wong is the younger sibling in her family. Before auditioning for Alpha Entertainment, she was a trainee at Ocean Butterflies International, where she did backup dancing for JJ Lin, Rainie Yang and Wang Lee Hom. Wong was also a business student at Temasek Polytechnic and had quit her studies at the institution after being accepted during the audition for a South Korean K-pop girl group. She moved to South Korea to prepare for her debut in a girl group.

== Career ==
=== 2012–2014: Skarf ===
After passing the audition by JYP & Alpha Entertainment, she debuted in Skarf, a four-member girl group with another Singaporean member, Tasha and two other Korean members. The group debuted with the song "Oh! Dance" on KBS's Music Bank on 17 August 2012. Wong had also made a cameo appearance in Singaporean TV series, It Takes Two with other Skarf members.

Skarf released their first EP album, Luv Virus, on 28 May 2013.

=== 2014–2015: Departure from Skarf, First and Gif To You ===
On 16 September 2014, it was announced that Wong will be leaving Skarf and will release a solo mandarin EP by 2015.

On 2 January 2015, Wong released her debut EP, First after a series of teasers. The EP consists of two Mandarin tracks and one Korean track. The Korean track, titled Luv Talk features Mint from Tiny-G. She held a press conference on the day of release at the atrium of Bugis+ in Singapore and will be promoting her album in Korea, China, Hong Kong, Taiwan, Thailand and Malaysia.

Wong left Alpha Entertainment in 2015 and co-founded an independent record label and artist management company, GIF Music. On 17 November 2015, she released a self-composed hip-hop single in English, Gif To You, which was released digitally on 17 November 2015.

=== 2019–present: Acting ===
In 2018, it was announced that Wong was cast in a horror-comedy film, titled When Ghost Meets Zombie, playing in her first lead role. She was paired up with fellow singer, Nathan Hartono. The film was released on 14 February 2019, and the official theme song, "等" was released on 25 January 2019, on Warner Music Singapore's YouTube channel. Her second single for the film, "匆匆" was released on AC Music Entertainment's YouTube Channel.

In 2025, Wong took on a dual role in Mediacorp's period drama Emerald Hill - The Little Nyonya Story, portraying Zhang An Ya and Zhou Hong Yu.

== Filmography ==
=== Film ===
Year	Title	Role	Notes	Ref.
2016	Young & Fabulous	Yumi		
2017	The Fortune Handbook	Fortune God intern	Cameo	
2019	When Ghost Meets Zombie	Zhen Zhen		
2022	Reunion Dinner	Young Yanling		

=== Television series ===
Year	Title	Role	Notes	Ref.
2012	It Takes Two	Herself	Cameo	
2019	Kin: Matthew's Story	Fiona		
2019	I'm Madam (女友变身记)	Veron Chew		
2021	Kin	Fiona		
2021	Mind Jumper (触心罪探)	Christine	Episode 6–7	
2021	CTRL	Zoey	Episode 17, 18 and 20	
2021	Wheels (天涯沦落轮)	Barbie		
2021	Live Your Dreams (大大的梦想)	Xie Huiting		
2021	Justice Boo (拯灵49天)	Jia Tian Yu		
2023	Silent Walls	An Lan	Episode 6–10	
2023	Oppa, Saranghae!	Jeon So-yeon version 2.0		
2023	The Sky is Still Blue	Liang Junlin		
2023	I Do, Do I?	Jiang Yihua		
2025	Emerald Hill - The Little Nyonya Story	Zhang Anya/Zhou Hongyu		
2025	The Spirit Hunter (带剑女孩)	Hua Cheng Feng		

=== Television shows ===
Year	Title	Notes	Ref.
2012	Oh! My Skarf	Reality show about Skarf's lives before debut	
2013	Korean Art Idol Competition – Everyone Gather	In 6th place	

== Discography ==
=== Extended plays ===
- First (2015)

=== Singles ===
Title	Year	Format	Album	Other notes
"GIF To You"	2015	Digital download, streaming	—N/a	
"Killer Boy"	2016	Digital download, streaming	—N/a	

=== Soundtrack appearances ===
Title	Year	Album	Notes
"等"	2019	When Ghost Meets Zombie OST	With Nathan Hartono
"匆匆"	2019	When Ghost Meets Zombie OST	

== Awards and nominations ==
Organisation	Year	Category	Nominated work	Result	Ref.
Star Awards	2022	Best Theme Song	"是谁" Theme song of Live Your Dreams	Nominated	
Star Awards	2024	Top 10 Most Popular Female Artistes	—N/a	Nominated	
Star Awards	2025	Top 10 Most Popular Female Artistes	—N/a	Nominated	
