= Karencici =

American singer-songwriter (born 1998)

Karencici 林愷倫
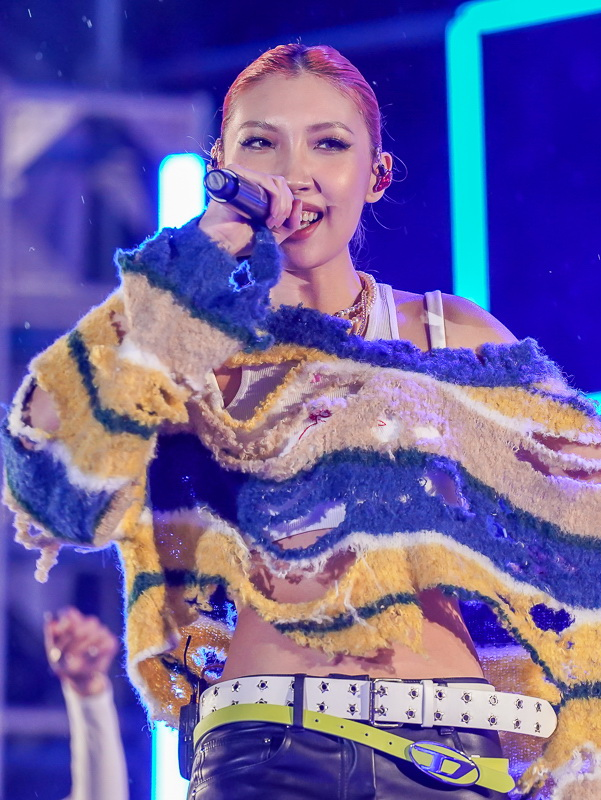
- Karencici in 2023

Background information
- Born: Karen Lam; January 12, 1998 (age 28); Los Angeles, California, United States
- Genres: R&B, hip-hop
- Occupation: Singer-songwriter
- Instrument: Vocals
- Years active: 2016–present
- Labels: HIM International Music; Ocean Star Music; Bootsncats Records
- Member of: PanThePack

Chinese name
- Traditional Chinese: 林愷倫
- Simplified Chinese: 林恺伦
Transcriptions
Standard Mandarin
- Hanyu Pinyin: Lín Kǎilún
- Wade–Giles: Lin^{2} Kʻai^{3}-lun^{2}
Yue: Cantonese
- Jyutping: Lam4 Hoi2leon4

Karen Lam (Chinese: 林愷倫, born January 12, 1998), better known by her stage name Karencici, is an American singer-songwriter. She is known for her Mandopop, R&B and hip-hop influenced music which often blends Mandarin and English lyrics. She is also a member of PanThePack, a Chinese hip-hop group formed by Jackson Wang in 2021, alongside Wang, J.Sheon, and Ice.

Born in Los Angeles, California, Karencici moved to Taipei at the age of 16 to pursue a music career and participated in Season 1 of Sing! China in 2016. She released her debut album, Sha Yan, in 2018, which earned her a nomination for Best New Artist at the 30th Golden Melody Awards. Her second album, 99% Angel, was released in 2022 and earned her a nomination for Best Female Mandarin Singer at the 33rd Golden Melody Awards. Her 2024 Mandopop song "Hard to Say" (愛你但說不出口), went viral in South Korea, prompting various K-pop artists to cover the song.

== Early life and songwriting career ==
Karen Lam was born on January 12, 1998, in Los Angeles, California. She spent part of her childhood in Hainan, and took piano, dance, and singing lessons that her grandmother enrolled her in. At the age of 14, she signed up to audition for Super Idol in Los Angeles alongside her mother. Only Lam was invited to audition, which resulted in an offer for a record deal with HIM International Music. However, her parents felt she was still too young, only signing the deal two years later. Lam then moved to Taipei to pursue a career in the Mandopop music industry. Arriving in Taipei without family or friends, Lam depended on her family back home for financial support until the release of her debut EP.

As she began writing songs for her record company, feedback from Lam's mentors prompted her to develop her composition and music production skills through online tutorials. In 2016, she participated in Season 1 of Sing! China, where she was mentored by Wang Feng. She later adopted the stage name Karencici, basing it on a nickname her grandmother gave her as a child.

As of February 2022, she has written over 400 songs, including songs for Jolin Tsai, Hebe Tien, and Yoga Lin.

== Music career ==
In April 2018, Karencici signed with South Korean label Ocean Star Music, under which she released her debut EP Blow Up in July 2018. Its title and cover were inspired by the 1966 film Blowup. The self-produced EP consists of three English-language R&B tracks, including "Go On", which features Korean-American rapper Junoflo and marked her debut on Taiwanese radio.

Her debut album, Sha Yan, was released in late 2018, earning her a nomination for Best New Artist at the 30th Golden Melody Awards. Reflecting on the album in a 2023 interview, she admitted it was "not very Karencici at all" as she did not have much musical or creative input during its creation, and no longer felt it reflected herself "personally or stylistically". In 2019, Karencici won the Best R&B Single for "Timeless" at the 10th Golden Indie Music Awards.

In 2021, Karencici joined PanThePack, a Chinese hip-hop group formed and led by Jackson Wang, alongside J.Sheon and Ice. Their single "Buzz" was released on August 28, followed by their 10-track debut album, The Pack, in September.

Her second album, 99% Angel, was released in 2022. It was named one of the "Best Asian Hip Hop and R&B [albums] of 2022 (So Far)" in April 2022 by HipHopDX, and earned her a nomination for Best Female Mandarin Singer at the 33rd Golden Melody Awards. The following year, in May 2023, Karencici released her second EP, Everybody Loves Me. She described it as a "super pop album", that was "light, bright, and playful for the audience". The EP features collaborations with Taiwanese rappers OSN and J.Sheon, KnowKnow of Higher Brothers, and a vocal performance from her partner and producer Kvn.

Karencici made her acting debut in 2024 with a brief guest appearance in the second season of the Taiwanese television drama The Victims' Game. In July 2024, Karencici released the single "Hard to Say" (愛你但說不出口), a Mandarin R&B track about struggling to express one's love through words. The song was covered by the South Korean singer Taeyang at a December 2024 concert in Taipei, which led to the song going viral in South Korea and further covers by K-pop artists, including Moonbyul of Mamamoo, Taesan of BoyNextDoor, Lee Mu-jin, Sung Han-bin, and Karina of Aespa, who performed the song at her 26th birthday celebration in 2026. In April 2026, "Hard to Say" debuted at number 15 on the Billboard Taiwan Songs chart, and peaked at number 6 in May 2026.

Karencici released her third album Made for You in late 2024. Her fourth album, Loser, was announced in May 2026 with the release of its lead single "If I Had". The album, which combines rock and R&B elements with English and Mandarin lyrics, was released on June 19, 2026, and followed by a supporting concert held in Taipei in July 2026.

== Personal life ==
Karencici is in a relationship with Kvn, who is also her frequent musical collaborator as a songwriter, producer and music video director. The pair met at a Starbucks restaurant in Taipei and bonded over their shared interest in music.

== Discography ==
=== Studio albums ===
- Sha Yan (2018)
- 99% Angel (2021)
- Made for You (2024)
- Loser (2026)

=== Extended plays ===
- Blow Up (2018)
- Everybody Loves Me (2023)

== Awards and nominations ==
- 30th Golden Melody Awards (2019): Nominated for Best New Artist for SHA YAN
- 10th Golden Indie Music Awards (2019): Won Best R&B Single for "Timeless"
- 33rd Golden Melody Awards (2022): Nominated for Best Female Mandarin Singer for 99% Angel

== Filmography ==
- The Victims' Game (2024) - Yuan Chi-Ling
