= Nathan Hartono =

Singaporean singer-songwriter and actor (born 1991)

- Born: Nathaniel Hartono; 26 July 1991 (age 35); Singapore
- Citizenship: Singaporean
- Education: Anglo-Chinese Junior College
- Alma mater: Berklee College of Music
- Occupations: Singer; songwriter; actor
- Years active: 2005–present
- Spouse: Liz Sergeant Tan (m. 2026)
- Parents: Thomas Hartono (father); Jocelyn Tjioe (mother)
- Family: Norman Hartono (brother); Nydia Hartono (sister)
- Musical career
- Instruments: Vocals; guitar
- Labels: Aquarius Musikindo; Yellow Music; Warner Music Singapore

Chinese name
- Chinese: 向洋
- Hanyu Pinyin: Xiàng Yáng

Nathaniel Hartono (Note: also known as Nathaniel Xiang) (born 26 July 1991) is a Singaporean singer-songwriter and actor. Hartono made his debut as a singer after he won the Teenage Icon singing competition in 2005. He would later release his debut album, LET ME SING! Life, Love and All That Jazz in 2006.

Hartono also ventured into acting and starred in his first television series, Halfworlds, in 2015. As the first runner-up of the first season of Sing! China, as of January 2017 he also works with the committee to Promote Chinese Language Learning (CPCLL) to enrich the learning of the Chinese language among Singapore students. Hartono performed the Singapore National Day Parade (NDP) theme song in 2020.

== Early life ==
Hartono was born in Singapore on 26 July 1991 to Chinese Indonesian parents, Nathan's father, Thomas Hartono, is the managing director of PT Anandini Vimala, while his mother, Jocelyn Tjioe, is the senior vice president of Singapore-based Tung Lok group, which was founded by his grandfather.

Hartono completed his primary school education at Nanyang Primary School and continued to Anglo-Chinese School (Barker Road) for his secondary education before graduating from Anglo-Chinese Junior College. In 2009, he was conscripted into the Singapore Armed Forces for national service. He subsequently studied at the Berklee College of Music majoring in Music Production & Engineering in Boston, and has taken a break from school since 2014.

Coming from an English-speaking family, Hartono struggled with learning the Chinese language in primary and secondary school, describing it as an "unclimbable mountain" in a 2017 interview. It was not until he entered junior college when he discovered his newfound interest in learning Chinese. In the same interview, he added that learning the language "could open up a lot of opportunities." After his stint at Sing! China, he could finally complete sentences in Mandarin without pausing or inserting English words. He has also spoken of how he is influenced by Frank Sinatra.

== Career ==
=== 2005-2009: Teenage Icon and music debut ===
After winning the 2005 Teenage Icon singing competition, Nathan made his debut as a singer in 2005 and released his first album, LET ME SING! Life, Love and All That Jazz, in 2006 which consisted of 11 tracks. The album charted as the number one album on HMV's Jazz Chart for two weeks after its release.

In 2007, Nathan performed at the Mosaic Music Festival and released his second album, Feeling Good with Nathan Hartono, which was recorded live during his sold-out shows in June the same year at the Esplanade. The album has a total of 12 tracks, with most of the songs covered by Nathan such as "Raindrops Keep Fallin' on My Head", "Everybody's Changing", "Moody's Mood for Love", "Seven Nation Army" during his concerts.

Nathan had also performed "Where I Belong" at Singapore's annual National Day Parade celebrations in 2008 and in 2009, he sang the theme song, Asia’s Youth, Our Future at the Asian Youth Games and also released a new album, Realise, which is a repackaged album of his first two albums. In that same year, he performed at Stephanie Sun's concert as a guest performer.

=== 2010-2016: Nathan Hartono, Indonesia debut and Halfworlds ===
In 2011, Nathan made his debut in Indonesia under Aquarius Musikindo, and released his first single, Terlanjur Sayang. He also took part in Pangdemonium's production of the rock musical, Spring Awakening opposite Julia Abueva.

In 2012, Nathan was nominated for an ELLE Award 2012 for his performance. He released his first EP, Nathan Hartono, which consists of 5 tracks, was a departure from his usual jazz work, exploring acoustic pop and folk style In December 2012, he released a Christmas single titled, I'll Be Home For Christmas and also recorded a track titled, "Layu Sebelum Berkembang" for the official soundtrack of Indonesian feature film Langit Ke 7.

On 30 June 2013, Nathan released an original single on his official YouTube channel titled, Thinkin Bout Love, which is only available digitally. In 2015, he released his second Indonesian single, Pasti Ada Jawabnya, three years after his first Indonesian album.

On 16 June 2016, Nathan acted in a web series drama called Can You Not?! produced by YouTube channel TreePotatoes. It was a 10 episode web drama. Beth (Janice Chiang) is an ambitious, cutthroat producer. Jason (Benjamin Kheng) is a brilliant, but cocky director. Dave (Nathan Hartono) is a charming, handsome gentleman who happens to be their client. Put them together, toss in a high-stakes corporate film project and you get a recipe for mayhem!.

=== 2016-2017: Sing! China and CPCLL Ambassador ===
In 2016, Nathan's breakthrough showing at the first season of Sing! China made him more famous in Singapore as well as in other Mandarin-speaking countries. He had become the first Singaporean to pass the blind auditions (all three of Singapore's previous entries to the show's predecessor, The Voice of China, had failed to do so). Upon catching the attention of all four judges who participated in the show: Jay Chou, Wang Feng, Na Ying, and Harlem Yu, he selected Chou as his mentor.

Under Chou's tutelage, he then worked his way to becoming the first Singaporean to make it to the semi-finals of both this show and The Voice of China. There, he was given 47 votes from the judges and 333 votes from the audience miraculously, thus finishing first in the semi-finals and successfully advancing to the finals - again as the first Singaporean contestant to do so. By then, his opponents were Chinese nationals Xu Geyang, Jiang Dunhao, Yang Meina and Wang Chenrui, as well as teenager Jeryl Lee of Malaysia.

He finished second overall in the final round that took place on 7 October at the Beijing National Stadium, after singing a mashup of classic hits "Moonlight Under The City" and "Women's Flower". This result was, nevertheless, the best a Singaporean (and any contestant who is not a Chinese citizen) has done in the competition since it went global in 2014.

This was amid controversy over the media voting process at the end of the finals. While there was supposed to have been 81 judges, 92 votes were cast – 45 of which were for Hartono and the remaining 47 for eventual champion Jiang Dunhao. Notwithstanding, amid speculation among netizens that the contest was rigged, Hartono had expressed that he was not at all disappointed by the results.

He returned to Singapore on 9 Oct to fans who received him at Changi Airport. Subsequently, in January 2017, he was appointed as an ambassador for the committee to Promote Chinese Language Learning at an event graced by chairman and Parliamentary Secretary for Education Low Yen Ling, in recognition for his achievements and for his efforts to improve his Mandarin during the course of the programme, and will work with the committee to promote the learning of the Chinese language among Singapore students. He was also nominated for The Straits Times Singaporean of the Year award.

=== 2018-present: Mandarin debut ===
In 2018, Hartono made his debut in the Chinese market by releasing a Mandarin-language version of his song "Electricity", which was released on 7 February 2018, in China, and 9 February elsewhere. Following that, later he released a Mandarin music video on 12 February 2018.

In the end of 2019, Hartono made a comeback under Warner Music China, with a Mandarin single song "Dig Deep", releasing the music video on 26 December 2019. Hartono is currently working on a series of releases in both Mandarin and English due for release in 2020.

In 2020, Singapore's National Day Parade (NDP) theme song "Everything I Am" is performed by Hartono.

== Other work ==
Aside from his work with the CPCLL, Hartono also takes part in the following:

In 2012, Hartono was the Ambassador of the Singaporean Eco Music Challenge. He was also the Opinion Leader (Music) of Puma Faas Beats Campaign 2012.

In 2017, Hartono was one of the Ambassadors, along with paralympian Theresa Goh and actor Ebi Shankara, of Pink Dot SG.

== Personal life ==
On 17 January 2026, Hartono married Singaporean theatre actress Liz Sergeant Tan after being in a relationship with each other for six years.

== Discography ==
=== Studio albums ===
Album information	Track listing
LET ME SING! Life, Love and All That Jazz: Released: 1 January 2006; Label: Yellow Music	Track listing: 1. Life Is Good; 2. Thinking of You; 3. Look at Us; 4. Pure Imagination; 5. My Crush; 6. Reminiscing; 7. Haven't We Met; 8. Easy; 9. I Will / Here, There And Everywhere (Medley); 10. Thinking of You (Jazz-it-up version); 11. Let Me Sing!
Feeling Good with Nathan Hartono: Released: 2007; Label: Yellow Music	Track listing: 1. Rock With You; 2. Haven't We Met; 3. Everybody's Changing; 4. Seven Nation Army; 5. You Make Feel So Young; 6. Moody's Mood For Love; 7. Raindrops Keep Falling on My Head; 8. Daydream; 9. Sir Duke; 10. Life Is Good; 11. My First, My Last, My Everything; 12. If It's Magic
Realise: Released: 1 January 2009; Label: Yellow Music	Track listing: 1. Stay; 2. Life Is Good; 3. Thinking of You; 4. Look at Us; 5. Pure Imagination; 6. My Crush; 7. Reminiscing; 8. Haven't We Met; 9. Easy; 10. Medley: I Will / Here There Everywhere; 11. Thinking of You (Jazz It Up Version); 12. Let Me Sing (Live); 13. Rock with You (Live); 14. Haven't We Met (Live); 15. Everybody's Changing (Live); 16. Seven Nation Army (Live); 17. You Make Me Feel So Young (Live); 18. Moody's Mood For Love (Live); 19. Raindrops Keep Falling on My Head (Live); 20. Daydream (Live); 21. Sir Duke (Live); 22. Life Is Good (Live); 23. My First, My Last, My Everything (Live); 24. If It's Magic (Live)
The Great Regression: Released: Upcoming; Label: Yellow Music	

=== Extended plays ===
Album information	Track listing
Nathan Hartono: Released: 1 September 2012; Label: Nathan Hartono	Track listing: 1. Take Me Home; 2. Life of a Superhero; 3. The Right Ones; 4. There Is Much More to This; 5. Weight of Her Love

=== Singles ===
Album information	Track listing
Terlanjur Sayang: Released: 15 August 2011; Label: Aquarius Musikindo	Track listing: 1. Terlanjur Sayang
I'll Be Home For Christmas: Released: 20 December 2012; Label: Aquarius Musikindo	Track listing: 1. I'll Be Home For Christmas
Layu Sebelum Berkembang: Released: 20 December 2012; Label: Aquarius Musikindo	Track listing: 1. Layu Sebelum Berkembang
Thinkin Bout Love: Released: 5 July 2013; Label: Nathan Hartono	Track listing: 1. Thinkin Bout Love
Pasti Ada Jawabnya: Released: 5 March 2015; Label: Aquarius Musikindo	Track listing: 1. Pasti Ada Jawabnya
Electricity: Released: 22 July 2016; Label: Nathan Hartono	Track listing: 1. Electricity
爱超给电 (Electricity Mandarin version): Released: 9 February 2018; Label: Warner Music Singapore	Track listing: 1. 爱超给电
解谜 (Dig Deep Mandarin version): Released: 26 December 2019; Label: Warner Music China	Track listing: 1. 解谜

=== Soundtracks ===
Album information	Track listing
Layu Sebelum Berkembang: Official soundtrack for Indonesian feature film Langit Ke 7; Released: 2012; Label: Aquarius Musikindo	Track listing: 1. Layu Sebelum Berkembang

=== Soundtrack appearances ===
Year	Title	Album title	Notes
2019	等	Non-album single	Theme song for When Ghost Meets Zombie

== Filmography ==
=== Television series ===
Year	Title	Role	Network
2015	Halfworlds	Coki	HBO Asia
2019	Remember Us This Way		Mediacorp Channel U

=== Variety and reality show ===
Year	Title	Network	Notes
2016	Sing! China	Zhejiang Television	Contestant; Finished 2nd

=== Film ===
Year	Title	Role	Notes
2019	When Ghost Meets Zombie	Pong	

== Theatre ==
Year	Title	Role	Company	Notes
2012	Spring Awakening	Melchoir	Pangdemonium (Singapore)	
2013	Next to Normal	Gabe	Pangdemonium (Singapore)	
2017	The Great Wall: One Woman's Journey	Fan Qiliang 范杞良	Glowtape Productions (Singapore)	
2025	The Last Five Years	Jamie Wellerstein	Singapore Repertory Theatre	
2026	Legally Blonde	Warner Huntington III	Singapore Repertory Theatre	
