= Xu Geyang =

Chinese singer (born 1996)

- Born: December 15, 1996 (age 29); Shenyang, Liaoning, China
- Occupations: Singer; Songwriter
- Years active: 2016–present
- Awards: "The Most Promising Singer"
- Musical career
- Instrument: Guitar

Xu Geyang (Chinese: 徐歌阳; pinyin: Xú Gēyáng; born December 15, 1996) is a Chinese singer-songwriter. In July 2016, she made her debut as a contestant on the first season of the reality television singing competition show Sing! China on Zhejiang Television. She finished fourth in the finals. She released her first single, "Forever", in May of 2017.

On November 20, 2017, Xu Geyang won her first award: "The Most Promising Singer" at a Chinese music awards ceremony.

== Career ==
=== 2016: Singing Career ===
==== Sing! China ====
In July 2016, Xu Geyang became a singer. She competed in Sing! China and joined Wang Feng's team. She passed the fighting rounds easily. In the cross-fighting round, she defeated Yu Tian (from Jay Chou's team) with a score of 35 to 16, and advanced to the semifinals. In the semifinals, she received the third highest score, 88.36, and advanced to the Top 6. In the finals, she won runner-up in Wang Feng's team and fourth place overall. During the competition, Xu Geyang was the most popular contestant with the public based on Chinese online polls.

==== Concerts attended in 2016 ====
| Date | Concert name | Location | References |
|---|---|---|---|
| October 18, 2016 | "苏立生首秀演唱会" | Zhengzhou | |

=== 2017-2018: Self-written singles ===
==== Notable singles released in 2017 ====
===== "Forever" =====
Her first single, "Forever", was released in May 2017. She wrote lyrics and the music herself. The song was praised by critics soon after released. In June, "Forever" was chosen as the ending song for the film "Wished" 《反转人生》. At the film premier, Xu Geyang said she was interested in acting.

===== "Chorn" =====
In December 2017, her single "Chorn" released. Xu Geyang wrote this song with two African musicians, Teddy Strings and Kenny Leonore. This song uses typical "Reggae" style. And Xu Geyang made this song's cover herself.

This song was also performed on "全球中文音乐榜上榜" by Xu Geyang herself.

==== Concerts attended in 2017 ====
| Date | Concert name | Location | References |
|---|---|---|---|
| January 7, 2017 | "陌陌17惊喜夜年度盛典" | Beijing | |
| March 14, 2017 | "中国后海音乐节" | Beijing | |
| April 22, 2017 | "红星美凯龙超级家博会" | Dongguan | |
| May 15, 2017 | "云集微店2周年庆典" | Wuzhen | |
| June 24, 2017 | "遂宁首届国际梦幻灯光节" | Suining | |
| August 27, 2017 | "青岛西海岸海洋幻境节" | Qingdao | |
| October 17, 2017 | Unknown | Ningxia | |
| November 21, 2017 | "热歌榜中榜" | Zhengzhou | |
| December 5, 2017 | "Berklee Chinese Pop Music Showcase" | Berkeley, United States | |
| December 16, 2017 | "全球中文音乐榜上榜" | Beijing | |
| December 31, 2017 | "友阿国际广场跨年演唱会" | Chenzhou | |

==== Notable singles released in 2018 ====
===== "Distorted" 《畸变》 =====
In May 2018, her single "Distorted" 《畸变》 released. This song uses pure rock music.

==== Concerts attended in 2018 ====
| Date | Concert name | Location | References |
|---|---|---|---|
| January 2, 2018 | "世界动漫之夜" | Changzhou | |
| February 3, 2018 | "北京城建2018群星跨年演唱会" | Chuzhou | |
| February 7, 2018 | "巅峰之夜演唱会" | Enshi | |
| March 2, 2018 | "云县啤酒狂欢节" | Lincang | |
| May 20, 2018 | Unknown | Wuxi | |

=== Other Career Avenues ===
==== Comedy ====
On November 25, 2016, Xu Geyang performed in a show in a traditional Chinese comedic style known as xiangsheng or "cross talk" with actor Sheng Lang.

==== Pingyao International Film Festival ====
On November 2, 2017, Xu Geyang appeared on Pingyao International Film Festival as a special guest. She sang "Dream Chaser" 《追梦赤子心》 on the film festival.

== Controversies ==
During the competition of Sing! China, especially at the early stage of the competition, Xu Geyang was very controversial. She was criticized by many people, and there was a lot of negative news about her.

=== Performance on Sing! China ===
Although Xu Geyang was praised by many people during the competition of Sing! China, many people also criticized her. Most of them thought she sings with roaring only. And her performing was controversial (Mainly in the early stage). Examples of criticism:

Chinese writer Liu Xinda was also disappointed with her because she couldn't enter university and there was too much negative news about her.

=== Family circumstance ===
Before she competed in Sing! China, Xu Geyang failed in the National Higher Education Entrance Examination twice. In the blind audition of Sing! China, she said she couldn't enter university because her family was poor. But soon after, some people found that she showed many expensive things on her micro-blog, such as imported snakes, top-brand bags and even the iphone 6Splus. This has caused many people to doubt her family circumstances.

=== Sex tape ===
On August 2, 2016, a sex tape published on Sina Weibo and WeChat, claiming it depicted Xu Geyang having sex with Wang Feng. Xu Geyang herself, Wang's studio, the producers of Sing! China, and Wang's wife, actress Zhang Ziyi, all spoke out against the video, saying it was fake.

== Discography ==
=== Singles ===
| Song name | Lyrics writer | Music writer | Length | Release date | Notes | References |
|---|---|---|---|---|---|---|
| "Forever" | Xu Geyang | Xu Geyang | 3:46 | May 16, 2017 | This song was chosen as the ending song of film "Wished" 《反转人生》 | |
| "Across the Pacific" 《穿越太平洋》 | Zhu Jintai, Peng Bo | Zhu Jintai, Peng Bo | 4:49 | August 8, 2017 | This song is the interlude song of youth drama "Sprays" 《浪花一朵朵》 | |
| "Shell" 《壳》 | Xu Geyang, S | Xu Geyang | 3:48 | November 1, 2017 | This song's lyrics contains Japanese | |
| "Chorn" | S | Xu Geyang | 3:05 | December 14, 2017 | This song was written with two African musicians | |
| "Distorted"《畸变》 | S | S | 5:18 | May 7, 2018 | This song uses pure rock music | |

== Awards ==
In November 2017, Xu Geyang won "The Most Promising Singer" award at a Chinese music awards ceremony.

== See also ==
- Sing! China (season 1)
