= Sing! China season 1 =

Sing! China
- Season 1
- Hosted by: Li Yong (episode 1–14); Yi Yi (episode 10, 14–15); Hu Qiaohua (episode 15)
- Coaches: Jay Chou; Na Ying; Wang Feng; Harlem Yu
- Winner: Jiang Dunhao 蒋敦豪
- Winning coach: Wang Feng
- Runner-up: Nathan Hartono 向洋
- Finals venue: Beijing National Stadium

Release
- Original network: Zhejiang Television
- Original release: 15 July – 7 October 2016

Season chronology
- Next → Season 2

The first season of the Chinese reality talent show Sing! China premiered on 15 July 2016 on Zhejiang Television. The show is loosely based on a similar competition format in the Netherlands, The Voice of Holland. The show is hosted by Li Yong. Jay Chou, Na Ying, Wang Feng, and Harlem Yu are the coaches, same as the fourth season of The Voice of China

On 7 October 2016, Jiang Dunhao of Team Wang Feng was announced as the winner of the season, with Nathan Hartono of Team Jay as runner-up. Wang Chenrui of Team Na Ying, Xu Geyang of Team Wang Feng, Yang Meina of Team Harlem, and Jeryl Lee of Team Na Ying finished in third, fourth, fifth, and sixth place respectively. This is the first and only season to feature 6 finalists.

== Coaches and hosts ==
Sing! China season 1 coaches

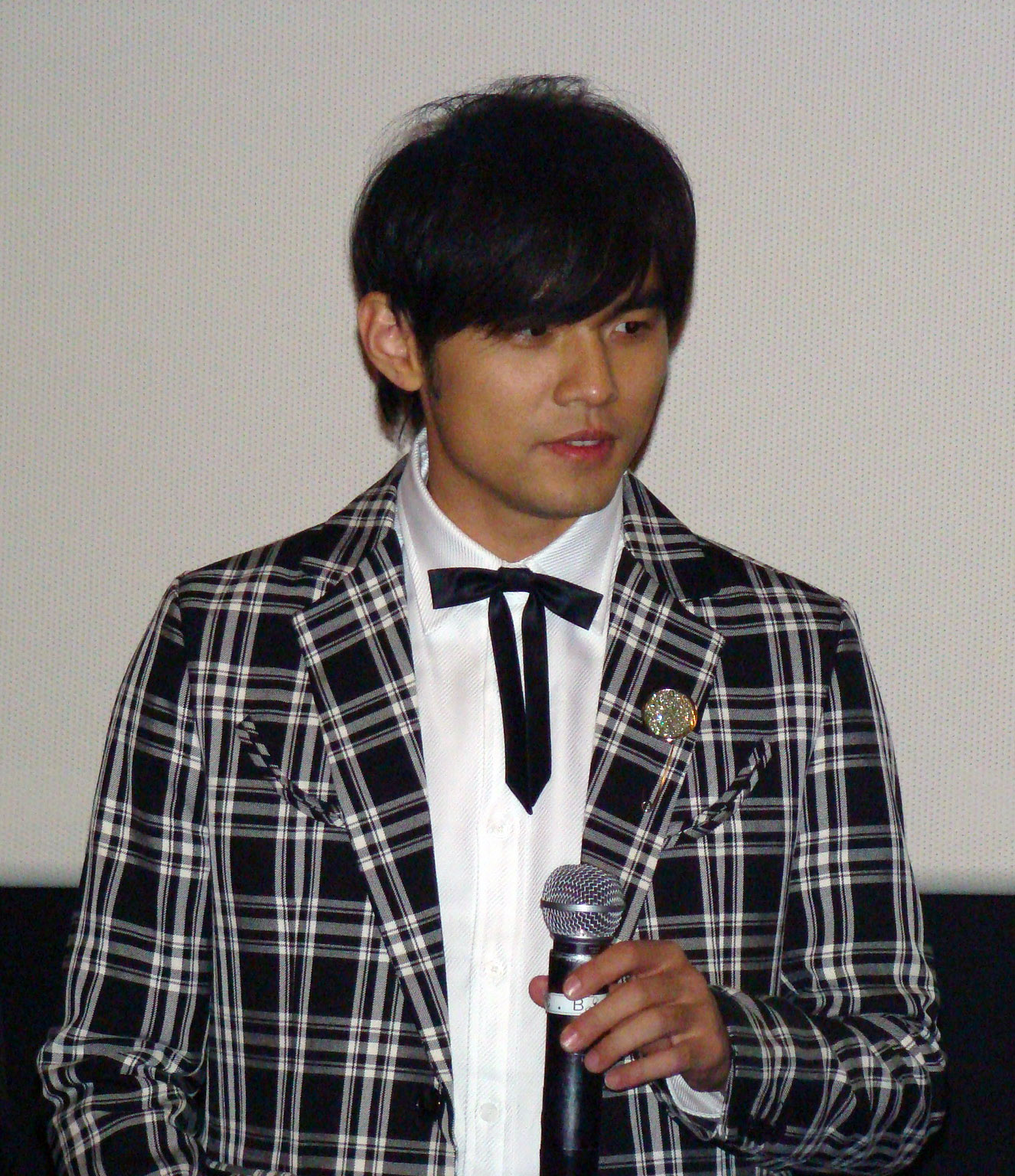
Jay Chou

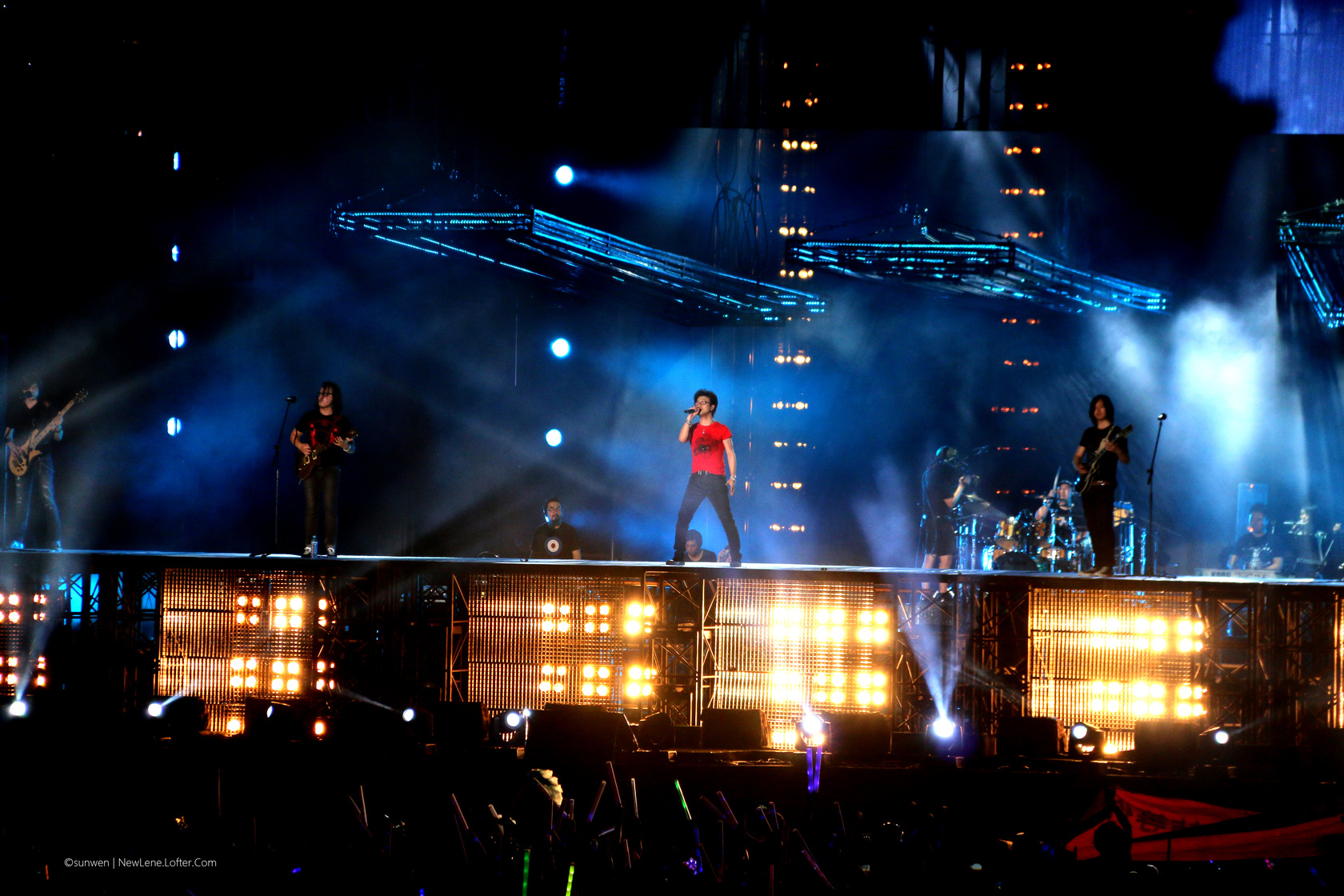
Wang Feng

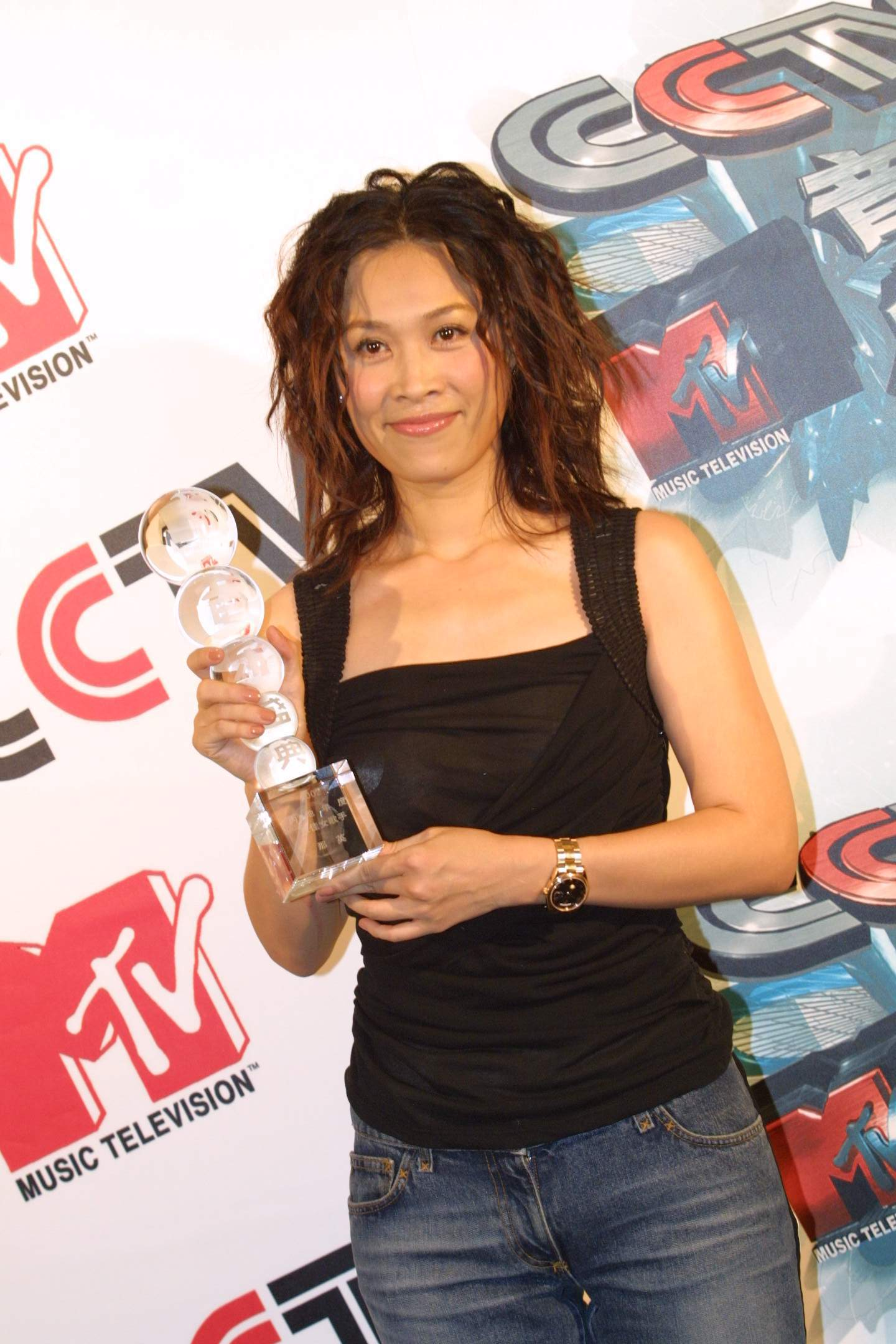
Na Ying

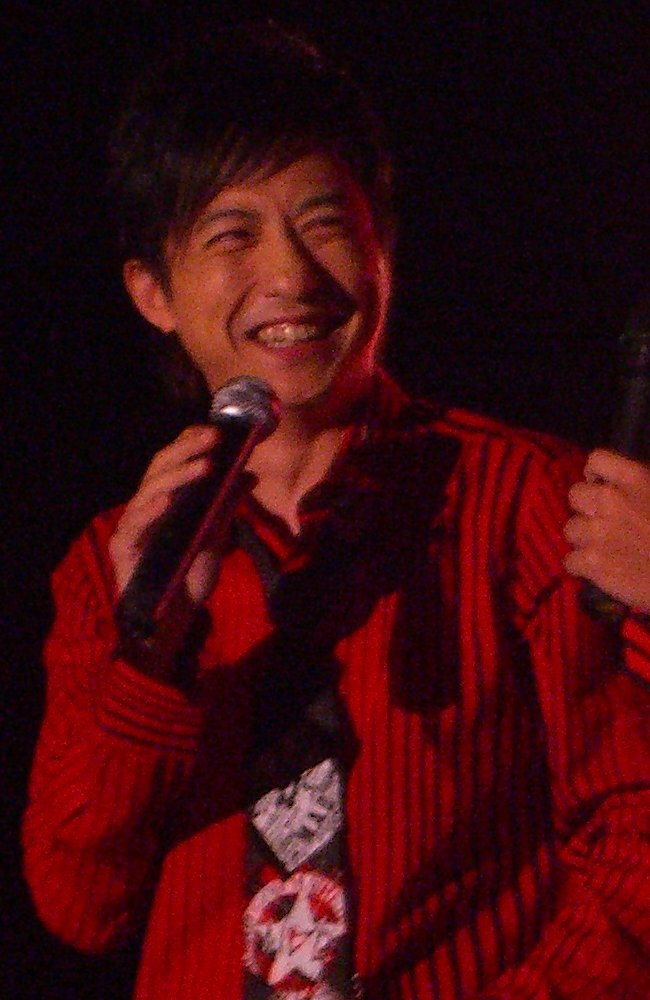
Harlem Yu

== Teams ==
Colour key

- Winner
- Runner-up
- Third place
- Fourth place
- Fifth place
- Sixth place
- Eliminated in the Top 12 Playoffs
- Eliminated in the Cross Fighting rounds
- Eliminated in the Fighting rounds
- Eliminated before the Fighting rounds

| Coaches | Top 48 artists | | | | |
|---|---|---|---|---|---|
| Jay Chou | | | | | |
| Jay Chou | Nathan Hartono 向洋 | Lokey 低调 | Yutian 羽田 | Pu Xiang 朴翔 | Zeng Minjie 曾敏杰 |
| Jay Chou | Bao Shiyu 包师语 | Cheng Sijia 程思佳 | Huang Junjie 黄俊杰 | Shan Liang 单良 | Wu Jiang 吴江 |
| Jay Chou | Gao Rui 高瑞 | You Miao 游淼 | | | |
| Wang Feng | | | | | |
| Wang Feng | Jiang Dunhao 蒋敦豪 | Xu Geyang 徐歌阳 | Liu Wentian 刘文天 | Karen Lam 林恺伦 | Zheng Jiawen 郑迦文 |
| Wang Feng | Ari 阿瑞 | Bai Ruoxi 白若溪 | Liu Xuejing 刘雪婧 | Lv Junzhe 吕俊哲 | Xiang Yahong 项亚蕻 |
| Wang Feng | Wen Ni 温妮 | | | | |
| Na Ying | | | | | |
| Na Ying | Wang Chenrui 汪晨蕊 | Jeryl Lee 李佩玲 | Su Lisheng 苏立生 | Vinida 万妮达 | Yang Bo 杨搏 |
| Na Ying | Bai Jingchen 白静晨 | Hou Zhibin 侯志斌 | Yang Shan 杨山 | Yue Jingqi 岳靖淇 | Zhou Yang 周旸 |
| Na Ying | Aisikaner 艾斯坎尔 | Guan Shipeng 关世鹏 | Liu Yutong 刘雨潼 | Zhu Lanlan 朱兰兰 | |
| Harlem Yu | | | | | |
| Harlem Yu | Yang Meina 杨美娜 | Jike Hao 吉克皓 | Zhao Xiaoxi 赵小熙 | Wang Chuang 王闯 | Yao Xi 姚希 |
| Harlem Yu | Emily Guan 官灵芝 | Fu Hao 付豪 | Li Ruixuan 李瑞轩 | Lil'Akin 阿克江‧阿依丁 | Lucia Wu 吴映香 |
| Harlem Yu | Zhang Zihe 张姊禾 | | | | |
Note: Italicised names are contestants who were not shown in the Blind Auditions episodes.

== Blind auditions ==
The taping of the blind auditions began on 19 June 2016.

Colour key

| ✔ | Coach pressed his or her button |
| | Artist defaulted to this coach's team |
| | Artist elected to join this coach's team |
| | Artist eliminated by coach before the Cross Fighting rounds |
| | Artist eliminated with no coach pressing his or her button |

=== Episode 1 (15 July) ===
The four coaches performed a medley of each other's songs – Na Ying performed Harlem Yu's "只有为你", Wang Feng performed Jay Chou's "安静", Yu performed Na's "不管有多苦", and Chou performed Wang's "满" – and concluded the performances with Chou's "我要夏天".

| Order | Artist | Age | Hometown | Song | Coach's and artist's choices | | | |
| Order | Artist | Age | Hometown | Song | Jay | Feng | Ying | Harlem |
|---|---|---|---|---|---|---|---|---|
| 1 | Nathan Hartono 向洋 | 25 | Singapore | "有没有" | ✔ | ✔ | ✔ | ✔ |
| 2 | Bai Ruoxi 白若溪 | 30 | Zhuozhou, Hebei | "无处安放" | — | ✔ | ✔ | — |
| 3 | You Miao 游淼 | 30 | Yibin, Sichuan | "双截棍" | ✔ | — | — | — |
| 4 | Jeryl Lee 李佩玲 | 16 | Penang, Malaysia | "心有独钟" | — | ✔ | ✔ | — |
| 5 | Jiang Dunhao 蒋敦豪 | 21 | Bole, Xinjiang | "天空之城" | — | ✔ | ✔ | — |
| 6 | Yang Bo 杨搏 | 26 | Wuhan, Hubei | "十万毫升泪水" | ✔ | ✔ | ✔ | ✔ |

=== Episode 2 (22 July) ===
| Order | Artist | Age | Hometown | Song | Coach's and artist's choices | | | |
| Order | Artist | Age | Hometown | Song | Jay | Feng | Ying | Harlem |
|---|---|---|---|---|---|---|---|---|
| 1 | Liu Xuejing 刘雪婧 | 22 | Shenzhen, Guangdong | "就是现在" | ✔ | ✔ | ✔ | — |
| 2 | Jike Hao 吉克皓 | 25 | Meigu County, Sichuan | "找自己" | ✔ | ✔ | ✔ | ✔ |
| 3 | Bai Jingchen 白静晨 | 21 | Pingdingshan, Henan | "小幸运" | — | — | ✔ | — |
| 4 | Su Lisheng 苏立生 | 29 | Yichun, Heilongjiang | "寂寞有多长" | — | ✔ | ✔ | — |
| 5 | Zeng Minjie 曾敏杰 | 20 | Dongguan, Guangdong | "我是不是该安静的走开" | ✔ | — | ✔ | ✔ |
| 6 | Liu Wentian 刘文天 | 36 | Ulan Hot, Inner Mongolia | "梦回唐朝" | — | ✔ | ✔ | — |
| 7 | Zheng Jiawen 郑迦文 | 19 | Taizhou, Zhejiang | "停格" | ✔ | ✔ | — | — |

=== Episode 3 (29 July) ===
Da Shan, Tan Xuanyuan and Ika Zhao, artists from Team Harlem on the previous seasons of The Voice of China, performed "我要给你" at the start of the show to celebrate Yu's 55th birthday.

| Order | Artist | Age | Hometown | Song | Coach's and artist's choices | | | |
| Order | Artist | Age | Hometown | Song | Jay | Feng | Ying | Harlem |
|---|---|---|---|---|---|---|---|---|
| 1 | Cheng Sijia 程思佳 | 21 | Shiyan, Hubei | "Bang Bang" | ✔ | ✔ | ✔ | ✔ |
| 2 | Hou Zhibin 侯志斌 | 27 | Chengdu, Sichuan | "爱情废柴" | ✔ | — | ✔ | — |
| 3 | Xu Geyang 徐歌阳 | 20 | Shenyang, Liaoning | "追梦赤子心" | ✔ | ✔ | ✔ | — |
| 4 | Ari 阿瑞 | 26 | Macau | "一起来" / "Uptown Funk" | — | ✔ | — | ✔ |
| 5 | Yao Xi 姚希 | 29 | Shantou, Guangdong | "小苹果" | ✔ | — | ✔ | ✔ |
| 6 | Pu Xiang 朴翔 | 26 | Tacheng, Xinjiang | "恋曲1980" | ✔ | ✔ | ✔ | ✔ |
| 7 | Zhao Xiaoxi 赵小熙 | 26 | Sanya, Hainan | "Kiss" | ✔ | ✔ | ✔ | ✔ |

=== Episode 4 (5 August) ===
Host Li Yong performed a medley of songs by the four coaches – Wang's "春天里", Yu's "情非得已", Na's "征服", and Chou's "听妈妈的话" – at the start of the show.

| Order | Artist | Age | Hometown | Song | Coach's and artist's choices | | | |
| Order | Artist | Age | Hometown | Song | Jay | Feng | Ying | Harlem |
|---|---|---|---|---|---|---|---|---|
| 1 | Li Ruixuan 李瑞轩 | 21 | Chongqing | "双刀" | ✔ | — | — | ✔ |
| 2 | Wang Chuang 王闯 | 19 | Wangmo County, Guizhou | "过不去" | — | ✔ | ✔ | ✔ |
| 3 | Shan Liang 单良 | 23 | Shenyang, Liaoning | "悟空" | ✔ | — | ✔ | ✔ |
| 4 | Yang Meina 杨美娜 | 27 | Yanji, Jilin | "Diamonds" | ✔ | ✔ | ✔ | ✔ |
| 5 | Chen Chen 陈晨 | 25 | Nanjing, Jiangsu | "夏洛特烦恼" | — | — | — | — |
| 6 | Vinida 万妮达 | 22 | Fuzhou, Fujian | "牛仔很忙" | ✔ | ✔ | ✔ | ✔ |
| 7 | Yang Shan 杨山 | 36 | Kaili, Guizhou | "小雪" | ✔ | — | ✔ | — |
| 8 | Huang Junjie 黄俊杰 | 22 | Shenyang, Liaoning | "雨下一整晚" | ✔ | — | ✔ | ✔ |

=== Episode 5 (12 August) ===
| Order | Artist | Age | Hometown | Song | Coach's and artist's choices | | | |
| Order | Artist | Age | Hometown | Song | Jay | Feng | Ying | Harlem |
|---|---|---|---|---|---|---|---|---|
| 1 | Lil'Akin 阿克江‧阿依丁 | 25 | Kuytun, Xinjiang | "在那遥远的地方" | — | — | ✔ | ✔ |
| 2 | Fu Hao 付豪 | 24 | Beijing | "恼人的秋风" / "Wake Up Call" / "Gimme! Gimme! Gimme! (A Man After Midnight)" | — | — | ✔ | ✔ |
| 3 | Lv Junzhe 吕俊哲 | 33 | Puyang, Henan | "大惊小怪" / "Back in Black" | ✔ | ✔ | ✔ | ✔ |
| 4 | Yue Jingqi 岳靖淇 | 21 | Zunyi, Guizhou | "冬季到台北来看雨" | — | — | ✔ | — |
| 5 | Xiang Yahong 项亚蕻 | 26 | Jinhua, Zhejiang | "Don't Cry" | — | ✔ | — | — |
| 6 | Emily Guan 官灵芝 | 57 | Taipei, Taiwan | "Unchain My Heart" | — | — | ✔ | ✔ |
| 7 | Zhou Yang 周旸 | 20 | Jinhua, Zhejiang | "我好想你" | ✔ | — | ✔ | ✔ |
| 8 | Lokey 低调 (Yang Hesu 杨和苏 & Zhang Xinyue 张馨月) | 21 / 24 | Chengdu, Sichuan / Shenyang, Liaoning | "Me, Myself & I" / "我的天空" / "Rap God" | ✔ | ✔ | ✔ | ✔ |
| 9 | Wang Chenrui 汪晨蕊 | 25 | Guangzhou, Guangdong | "深海" | — | ✔ | ✔ | — |
| 10 | Wu Jiang 吴江 | 30 | Mianyang, Sichuan | "17岁女生的温柔" / "我是女生" | ✔ | — | — | ✔ |
| 11 | Lucia Wu 吴映香 | 17 | São Paulo, Brazil | "我的梦" / "Dream It Possible" / "Undo" | ✔ | ✔ | ✔ | ✔ |
| 12 | Karen Lam 林恺伦 | 18 | Los Angeles, United States | "爱是什么" | ✔ | ✔ | — | ✔ |
| 13 | Yutian 羽田 | 24 | Toronto, Canada | "那些花儿" | ✔ | ✔ | ✔ | ✔ |
| 14 | Bao Shiyu 包师语 | 19 | Changchun, Jilin | "安和桥" | ✔ | ✔ | ✔ | — |

== The Fighting ==
In this revamped version of the show, the Battle and Knockout rounds from The Voice franchise were combined and rebranded as the "Fighting rounds". The battling element from the Battle rounds – two artists paired together for a duet – did not return due to copyright concerns from show's producers. Only the concept from the Knockout rounds were kept and presented in the Fighting rounds – an artist performing a solo song against another artist from their own team, with their respective coach picking the winner among the two to advance to the Playoff rounds. The Fightings episodes were aired on 19, 26 August and 2, 9 September 2016.

The coaches' advisors for the season are Tanya Chua for Team Wang Feng, Fei Yu-ching for Team Jay, Mavis Fan for Team Harlem and Lang Lang for Team Na Ying. Occasionally, the advisors would provide recommendations to their respective team coach on who they should advance to the next round. However, the recommendations would not have an effect on the outcome of the results as the final decisions lie solely on the team coaches themselves.

Colour key

| Artist won the Fighting and advanced to the Playoffs |
| Artist lost the Fighting and was eliminated |

| Episode | Coach | Order | Song | Winner | Loser | Song |
|---|---|---|---|---|---|---|
| Episode 6 (19 August) | Wang Feng | 1 | "Goodbye My Lover" | Zheng Jiawen 郑迦文 | Ari 阿瑞 | "Beat It" / "一起摇摆" |
| Episode 6 (19 August) | Wang Feng | 2 | "一万次悲伤" | Xu Geyang 徐歌阳 | Liu Xuejing 刘雪婧 | "See You Again" / "再见" |
| Episode 6 (19 August) | Wang Feng | 3 | "乌兰巴托的夜" | Jiang Dunhao 蒋敦豪 | Xiang Yahong 项亚蕻 | "空空如也" |
| Episode 6 (19 August) | Wang Feng | 4 | "你要的爱" | Karen Lam 林恺伦 | Bai Ruoxi 白若溪 | "追梦人" |
| Episode 6 (19 August) | Wang Feng | 5 | "I Don't Want to Miss a Thing" | Liu Wentian 刘文天 | Lv Junzhe 吕俊哲 | "没时间后悔" |
| Episode 7 (26 August) | Jay Chou | 1 | "Bad" | Lokey 低调 | Cheng Sijia 程思佳 | "不同凡想" |
| Episode 7 (26 August) | Jay Chou | 2 | "Thinking Out Loud" / "凤凰于飞" | Yutian 羽田 | Shan Liang 单良 | "南屏晚钟" / "I'm Yours" |
| Episode 7 (26 August) | Jay Chou | 3 | "伤痕" | Zeng Minjie 曾敏杰 | Bao Shiyu 包师语 | "彩虹" |
| Episode 7 (26 August) | Jay Chou | 4 | "我们都寂寞" | Nathan Hartono 向洋 | Huang Junjie 黄俊杰 | "迷迭香" |
| Episode 7 (26 August) | Jay Chou | 5 | "把悲伤留给自己" | Pu Xiang 朴翔 | Wu Jiang 吴江 | "在雨中" |
| Episode 8 (2 September) | Harlem Yu | 1 | "旋木" | Jike Hao 吉克皓 | Lil'Akin 阿克江‧阿依丁 | "让我一次爱个够" |
| Episode 8 (2 September) | Harlem Yu | 2 | "青春修炼手册" / "听妈妈的话" | Yao Xi 姚希 | Li Ruixuan 李瑞轩 | "谢谢侬" |
| Episode 8 (2 September) | Harlem Yu | 3 | "忘记拥抱" | Wang Chuang 王闯 | Lucia Wu 吴映香 | "秋天别来" |
| Episode 8 (2 September) | Harlem Yu | 4 | "花田错" | Zhao Xiaoxi 赵小熙 | Fu Hao 付豪 | "东风破" / "Can't Feel My Face" |
| Episode 8 (2 September) | Harlem Yu | 5 | "当" | Yang Meina 杨美娜 | Emily Guan 官灵芝 | "给自己的歌" |
| Episode 9 (9 September) | Na Ying | 1 | "少年故事" | Yang Bo 杨搏 | Bai Jingchen 白静晨 | "克卜勒" |
| Episode 9 (9 September) | Na Ying | 2 | "爱情转移" / "富士山下" | Wang Chenrui 汪晨蕊 | Hou Zhibin 侯志斌 | "不醉不会" |
| Episode 9 (9 September) | Na Ying | 3 | "难道" | Su Lisheng 苏立生 | Yang Shan 杨山 | "九月" |
| Episode 9 (9 September) | Na Ying | 4 | "不要对他说" | Jeryl Lee 李佩玲 | Zhou Yang 周旸 | "Racheal" |
| Episode 9 (9 September) | Na Ying | 5 | "给我一个吻" | Vinida 万妮达 | Yue Jingqi 岳靖淇 | "It's a Man's Man's Man's World" |

Non-competition performances
| Order | Performer(s) | Song |
|---|---|---|
| 6.1 | Tanya Chua | "当我想你的时候" |
| 7.1 | Fei Yu-ching | "青花瓷" |
| 7.2 | Fei Yu-ching & Jay Chou | "千里之外" |
| 8.1 | Mavis Fan & Harlem Yu | "快乐颂" |
| 9.1 | Lang Lang & Na Ying | "相爱恨早" |

== The Playoffs & Live Show ==
The Playoffs began on 16 September and comprised episodes 11, 12, and 13, aired over three weeks. They were followed by the live show on the fourth week, the final phase of the competition.

From this point on in the competition, the remaining artists went head-to-head against artists from the other teams, which introduced the possibility of having a group of finalists without equal team representation.

=== Week 1–2: The Cross Fightings (16 & 23 September) ===
The first two weeks of the Playoff rounds featured coaches competing with an opposing coach with their remaining artists. Through the drawing of lots, it was decided that coach Na Ying would be given the opportunity to pick her opposing coach, and the remaining two coaches who were not picked by her would go head-to-head against each other in a separate episode. Na eventually picked Harlem Yu, and competed with him in the twelfth episode; while Team Jay competed with Team Wang Feng in the eleventh.

In a Cross Fighting, an artist would be sent by his or her coach to compete against an artist from the opposing team. The selection of the artists and their order of appearance were all decided by their respective coaches, and all of which were done without the knowledge of the opposing coach. Therefore, the pairings were completely by random, and would only be revealed when the coaches revealed their selection on stage. At the end of each Cross Fighting round, the artist receiving the most votes from the 51-person professional judging panel would advance to the next Playoff round. Each member of the judging panel was entitled to one vote per pairing.

Each of the coaches was allowed to save one losing artist from their respective team, and they had to decide on the spot if they would like to exercise the power on the artist once he or she was announced as the loser of a Cross Fighting. If the losing coach decides not to, the artist would be immediately eliminated. The two artists that were saved by the coaches (one from each team) would then perform again in the "coach's save" round, with the one receiving the most judges votes moving on to the Top 12. In the event when there was only one saved artist as the opposing coach failed to exercise his or her power, the only saved artist would be given walkover and automatically advance to the next round without having to perform again.

Colour key

| Artist won the Cross Fighting and advanced to the Top 12 |
| Artist lost the Cross Fighting but was saved by coach |
| Artist won the Cross Fighting in the "coach's save" round and advanced to the Top 12 |
| Artist lost the Cross Fighting and was eliminated |

| Episode | Coach | Order | Artist | Song | Panel votes | Result |
|---|---|---|---|---|---|---|
| Episode 11 (16 September) | Jay Chou | 1.1 | Nathan Hartono 向洋 | "天台的月光" / "Moondance" | 41 | Judges' vote |
| Episode 11 (16 September) | Wang Feng | 1.2 | Karen Lam 林恺伦 | "Writing's on the Wall" | 10 | Eliminated |
| Episode 11 (16 September) | Jay Chou | 2.1 | Zeng Minjie 曾敏杰 | "爱什么稀罕" | 16 | Eliminated |
| Episode 11 (16 September) | Wang Feng | 2.2 | Jiang Dunhao 蒋敦豪 | "离开北京" | 35 | Judges' vote |
| Episode 11 (16 September) | Jay Chou | 3.1 | Lokey 低调 | "Lose Yourself" / "平凡之路" | 38 | Judges' vote |
| Episode 11 (16 September) | Wang Feng | 3.2 | Zheng Jiawen 郑迦文 | "Lost Stars" | 13 | Eliminated |
| Episode 11 (16 September) | Jay Chou | 4.1 | Yutian 羽田 | "搁浅" | 16 | Jay's save |
| Episode 11 (16 September) | Wang Feng | 4.2 | Xu Geyang 徐歌阳 | "横冲直撞" | 35 | Judges' vote |
| Episode 11 (16 September) | Jay Chou | 5.1 | Pu Xiang 朴翔 | "Is This Love" | 20 | Eliminated |
| Episode 11 (16 September) | Wang Feng | 5.2 | Liu Wentian 刘文天 | "晚安北京" | 31 | Judges' vote |
| Episode 11 (16 September) | Coach's save performances | | | | | |
| Episode 11 (16 September) | Jay Chou | —N/a | Yutian 羽田 | Given walkover as Wang Feng failed to save an artist from his team | | |
| Episode 12 (23 September) | Na Ying | 1.1 | Jeryl Lee 李佩玲 | "Fight Song" | 38 | Judges' vote |
| Episode 12 (23 September) | Harlem Yu | 1.2 | Wang Chuang 王闯 | "逃亡" | 13 | Eliminated |
| Episode 12 (23 September) | Na Ying | 2.1 | Yang Bo 杨搏 | "枫" | 16 | Eliminated |
| Episode 12 (23 September) | Harlem Yu | 2.2 | Yang Meina 杨美娜 | "黄豆" | 35 | Judges' vote |
| Episode 12 (23 September) | Na Ying | 3.1 | Vinida 万妮达 | "不潮不用花钱" / "Dirty Mind" | 19 | Na Ying's save |
| Episode 12 (23 September) | Harlem Yu | 3.2 | Jike Hao 吉克皓 | "静心等" | 32 | Judges' vote |
| Episode 12 (23 September) | Na Ying | 4.1 | Wang Chenrui 汪晨蕊 | "友情岁月" | 34 | Judges' vote |
| Episode 12 (23 September) | Harlem Yu | 4.2 | Zhao Xiaoxi 赵小熙 | "Happy" | 17 | Harlem's save |
| Episode 12 (23 September) | Na Ying | 5.1 | Su Lisheng 苏立生 | "流着泪说分手" | 26 | Judges' vote |
| Episode 12 (23 September) | Harlem Yu | 5.2 | Yao Xi 姚希 | "醉拳" | 25 | Eliminated |
| Episode 12 (23 September) | Coach's save performances | | | | | |
| Episode 12 (23 September) | Harlem Yu | 1 | Zhao Xiaoxi 赵小熙 | "不敢停止想你" | 27 | Judges' vote |
| Episode 12 (23 September) | Na Ying | 2 | Vinida 万妮达 | "焚心以火" | 24 | Eliminated |

Non-competition performances
| Order | Performers | Song |
|---|---|---|
| 11.1 | Jay Chou & his team (Lokey 低调, Nathan Hartono 向洋, Pu Xiang 朴翔, Yutian 羽田 & Zeng Minjie 曾敏杰) | "恒星" / "烟花易冷" |
| 11.2 | Wang Feng & his team (Jiang Dunhao 蒋敦豪, Karen Lam 林恺伦, Liu Wentian 刘文天, Xu Geyang 徐歌阳 & Zheng Jiawen 郑迦文) | "蜗牛" |
| 12.1 | Na Ying & her team (Jeryl Lee 李佩玲, Su Lisheng 苏立生, Vinida 万妮达, Wang Chenrui 汪晨蕊 & Yang Bo 杨搏) | "靠近" / "命中注定" / "报告班长" / "热情的沙漠" / "整晚的音乐" |
| 12.2 | Harlem Yu & his team (Jike Hao 吉克皓, Wang Chuang 王闯, Yang Meina 杨美娜, Yao Xi 姚希 & Zhao Xiaoxi 赵小熙) | "白天不懂夜的黑" / "Pretty Boy" |

=== Week 3: Top 12 (30 September) ===
The Top 12 performed on the third week of the Playoffs for a spot in the finals. The order of appearance was decided through the drawing of lots by the coaches. In deciding who moves on, a professional judging panel made up of 51 veteran record producers, music critics, and media practitioners from various media companies; as well as the studio audience made up of 350 members of the public were given an equal say. Each of the voters was entitled to one vote per artist, and they can either choose to vote or not vote for a particular artist. The total number of votes cast by the professional judging panel and studio audience were converted into points accordingly to the weightage (50% each). The six artists with the highest accumulated total points would advance to the finals.

Colour key

| Artist received the highest accumulated total points and advanced to the finals |
| Artist received the lowest accumulated total points and was eliminated |

| Episode | Coach | Order | Artist | Song | Judges votes (points) | Public votes (points) | Total points | Result |
|---|---|---|---|---|---|---|---|---|
| Episode 13 (30 September) | Jay Chou | 1 | Yutian 羽田 | "小镇姑娘" / "Come Together" | 24 (23.53) | 239 (34.14) | 57.67 | Eliminated |
| Episode 13 (30 September) | Harlem Yu | 2 | Zhao Xiaoxi 赵小熙 | "我要我们在一起" | 18 (17.65) | 302 (43.14) | 60.79 | Eliminated |
| Episode 13 (30 September) | Na Ying | 3 | Jeryl Lee 李佩玲 | "我知道你很难过" | 39 (38.24) | 306 (43.71) | 81.95 | Advanced |
| Episode 13 (30 September) | Wang Feng | 4 | Xu Geyang 徐歌阳 | "异类" | 40 (39.22) | 344 (49.14) | 88.36 | Advanced |
| Episode 13 (30 September) | Jay Chou | 5 | Nathan Hartono 向洋 | "Desperado" / "忘不了" | 47 (46.08) | 333 (47.57) | 93.65 | Advanced |
| Episode 13 (30 September) | Harlem Yu | 6 | Jike Hao 吉克皓 | "滚滚红尘" | 29 (28.43) | 337 (48.14) | 76.57 | Eliminated |
| Episode 13 (30 September) | Na Ying | 7 | Su Lisheng 苏立生 | "私奔" | 30 (29.41) | 327 (46.72) | 76.13 | Eliminated |
| Episode 13 (30 September) | Wang Feng | 8 | Jiang Dunhao 蒋敦豪 | "傻瓜" | 33 (32.35) | 348 (49.72) | 82.07 | Advanced |
| Episode 13 (30 September) | Jay Chou | 9 | Lokey 低调 | "夜空中最亮的星" / "星晴" | 26 (25.49) | 322 (46.00) | 71.49 | Eliminated |
| Episode 13 (30 September) | Harlem Yu | 10 | Yang Meina 杨美娜 | "春泥" | 38 (37.25) | 311 (44.43) | 81.68 | Advanced |
| Episode 13 (30 September) | Na Ying | 11 | Wang Chenrui 汪晨蕊 | "你还要我怎样" | 44 (43.14) | 323 (46.14) | 89.28 | Advanced |
| Episode 13 (30 September) | Wang Feng | 12 | Liu Wentian 刘文天 | "地心" | 34 (33.33) | 308 (44.00) | 77.33 | Eliminated |

=== Week 4: Finals (7 October) ===
The Top 6 performed in the two-part season finale on 7 October 2016, held at the Beijing National Stadium. In the first round of the competition, the six finalists performed a duet or trio with their respective coach and a finalist from their team (if any), then a solo song. Based on the public votes received from the live audience at the end of the first round, the bottom four artists with the fewest votes were eliminated.

The final two artists then sang their winner's song in the second round of the competition, with the 81-person professional judging panel and live audience voting for the winner. Every member of the professional judging panel was entitled to one vote, and the total number of votes received by each artist were converted into percentage points based on the total voting strength, 81. Similarly, the public votes received from the live audience were also converted into percentage points based on the total number of the votes received by the final two artists. The artist who received the higher total average points was announced as the winner.

| Coach | Artist | Order | Duet/Trio song (with coach) | Order | Solo song | Order | Winner's song | Public votes (points if applicable) | Judges votes (points) | Total average points | Result |
|---|---|---|---|---|---|---|---|---|---|---|---|
| Jay Chou | Nathan Hartono 向洋 | 1 | "双截棍" / "说走就走"^{1} | 7 | "最长的电影" | 11 | "城里的月光" / "女人花" | 45,613^{2} (43.3) | 45 (48.9)^{4} | 46.1 | Runner-up |
| Na Ying | Wang Chenrui 汪晨蕊 | 2 | "爱上你等于爱上寂寞" | 9 | "当年情" | N/A (already eliminated) | | 28,009 | N/A | | Third place |
| Wang Feng | Xu Geyang 徐歌阳 | 4 | "满"^{1} | 6 | "蝶" | N/A (already eliminated) | | 20,722 | N/A | | Fourth place |
| Wang Feng | Jiang Dunhao 蒋敦豪 | 4 | "满" | 10 | "河流" | 12 | "窗台" | 59,852^{3} (56.7) | 47 (51.1)^{4} | 53.9 | Winner |
| Na Ying | Jeryl Lee 李佩玲 | 2 | "爱上你等于爱上寂寞" | 5 | "随它吧" / "Let It Go" | N/A (already eliminated) | | 14,227 | N/A | | Sixth place |
| Harlem Yu | Yang Meina 杨美娜 | 3 | "Diamonds" / "命中注定" | 8 | "倔强" | N/A (already eliminated) | | 19,066 | N/A | | Fifth place |

Non-competition performances
| Order | Performers | Song |
|---|---|---|
| 15.1 | Joker Xue & Vinida 万妮达 | "丑八怪" / "给我一个吻" |
| 15.2 | The Top 40 (minus Lil'Akin 阿克江‧阿依丁, Bai Ruoxi 白若溪, Fu Hao 付豪, Lv Junzhe 吕俊哲 & Pu Xiang 朴翔) | "光明" |

1. Before the commencement of the solo performances in the first round, it was revealed Nathan Hartono 向洋 and Xu Geyang 徐歌阳 were leading in the number of public votes.
2. Nathan Hartono 向洋 received 35,577 votes in the first round, and accumulated 45,613 votes by the end of second round.
3. Jiang Dunhao 蒋敦豪 received 39,962 votes in the first round, and accumulated 59,852 votes by the end of second round.
4. Even though it was confirmed only 81 judges cast their votes, the total professional judging panel vote count added up to 92 instead of 81, due to a technical glitch. As the vote count was acknowledged on the show and the producers have yet to respond to the irregularity, the percentage points were converted based on the total vote count, 92, instead of the supposed 81.

== Non-competition shows ==
=== The Mid-Autumn Special (15 September) ===
Colour key

| Artist won the Cross Fighting |
| Artist lost the Cross Fighting |

| Episode | Coaches | Order | Artist | Song | Result |
|---|---|---|---|---|---|
| Episode 10 (15 September) | Na Ying & Harlem Yu | 1.1 | Bai Jingchen 白静晨 | "小幸运" | Lost audience's vote |
| Episode 10 (15 September) | Jay Chou & Wang Feng | 1.2 | Shan Liang 单良 | "悟空" | Won audience's vote |
| Episode 10 (15 September) | Jay Chou & Wang Feng | 2.1 | Bao Shiyu 包师语 | "安和桥" | Lost audience's vote |
| Episode 10 (15 September) | Na Ying & Harlem Yu | 2.2 | Yang Shan 杨山 | "九月" | Won audience's vote |
| Episode 10 (15 September) | Na Ying & Harlem Yu | 3.1 | Li Ruixuan 李瑞轩 | "谢谢侬" | Won audience's vote |
| Episode 10 (15 September) | Jay Chou & Wang Feng | 3.2 | Lv Junzhe 吕俊哲 | "没时间后悔" | Lost audience's vote |
| Episode 10 (15 September) | Na Ying & Harlem Yu | 4.1 | Emily Guan 官灵芝 | "给自己的歌" | Not revealed |
| Episode 10 (15 September) | Jay Chou & Wang Feng | 4.2 | Liu Xuejing 刘雪婧 | "就是现在" | Not revealed |

Other performances
| Order | Performer(s) | Song |
|---|---|---|
| 10.1 | Joker Xue | "你还要我怎样" |
| 10.2 | Na Ying | "花一开满就相爱" |
| 10.3 | Harlem Yu | "我最摇摆" |
| 10.4 | Wang Feng | "谢谢" |
| 10.5 | Jay Chou & his team (Lokey 低调, Nathan Hartono 向洋, Pu Xiang 朴翔, Yutian 羽田 & Zeng Minjie 曾敏杰) | "说走就走" |
| 10.6 | Fei Yu-ching | "花好月圆" |

=== The National Day Special (3 October) ===
Colour key

| Artist is a winning member of the "Best Team" |

| Episode | Coach | Order | Artist | Song | Result |
|---|---|---|---|---|---|
| Episode 14 (3 October) | Harlem Yu | 1.1 | Zhao Xiaoxi 赵小熙 | "Kiss" | Team Na Ying lead |
| Episode 14 (3 October) | Na Ying | 1.2 | Su Lisheng 苏立生 | "寂寞有多长" | Team Na Ying lead |
| Episode 14 (3 October) | Jay Chou | 1.3 | Yutian 羽田 | "那些花儿" | Team Na Ying lead |
| Episode 14 (3 October) | Wang Feng | 1.4 | Liu Xuejing 刘雪婧 | "See You Again" / "再见" | Team Na Ying lead |
| Episode 14 (3 October) | Harlem Yu | 2.1 | Jike Hao 吉克皓 | "找自己" | Team Harlem lead |
| Episode 14 (3 October) | Wang Feng | 2.2 | Zheng Jiawen 郑迦文 | "Goodbye My Lover" | Team Harlem lead |
| Episode 14 (3 October) | Na Ying | 2.3 | Yang Bo 杨搏 | "十万毫升泪水" | Team Harlem lead |
| Episode 14 (3 October) | Jay Chou | 2.4 | Lokey 低调 | "Bad" | Team Harlem lead |
| Episode 14 (3 October) | Wang Feng | 3.1 | Liu Wentian 刘文天 | "梦回唐朝" | Team Jay won |
| Episode 14 (3 October) | Harlem Yu | 3.2 | Yao Xi 姚希 | "小苹果" | Team Jay won |
| Episode 14 (3 October) | Jay Chou | 3.3 | Zeng Minjie 曾敏杰 | "我是不是该安静的走开" | Team Jay won |
| Episode 14 (3 October) | Na Ying | 3.4 | Vinida 万妮达 | "给我一个吻" | Team Jay won |

Other performances
| Order | Performer(s) | Song |
|---|---|---|
| 14.1 | Harlem Yu | "静静的" |
| 14.2 | Wang Feng | "你走你的路" |
| 14.3 | Jay Chou & Lokey 低调 | "告白气球" |
| 14.4 | Harlem Yu | "缺口" |
| 14.5 | Na Ying | "相见不如怀念" / "默" / "白天不懂夜的黑" / "征服" |
| 14.6 | Wang Feng | "再见蒲公英" |
| 14.7 | Jay Chou & Yutian 羽田 | "算什么男人" |

== Elimination chart ==
=== Overall ===
Artist's info

- Artist from Team Harlem
- Artist from Team Wang Feng
- Artist from Team Na Ying
- Artist from Team Jay

Result details

- Winner
- Runner-up
- Third place
- Fourth place
- Fifth place
- Sixth place
- Artist was saved by the media judging panel / received the highest accumulated total points and advanced to the finals
- Artist was saved by coach and won the "coach's save" round
- Artist was saved by coach but lost the "coach's save" round
- Artist was eliminated
- Artist did not perform

| Artist | Week 1 | Week 2 | Week 3 | Finals |
|---|---|---|---|---|
| Jiang Dunhao 蒋敦豪 | Safe | | Safe (4th) | Winner |
| Nathan Hartono 向洋 | Safe | | Safe (1st) | Runner-up |
| Wang Chenrui 汪晨蕊 | | Safe | Safe (2nd) | Third place |
| Xu Geyang 徐歌阳 | Safe | | Safe (3rd) | Fourth place |
| Yang Meina 杨美娜 | | Safe | Safe (6th) | Fifth place |
| Jeryl Lee 李佩玲 | | Safe | Safe (5th) | Sixth place |
| Liu Wentian 刘文天 | Safe | | Eliminated (7th) | Eliminated (Week 3) |
| Jike Hao 吉克皓 | | Safe | Eliminated (8th) | Eliminated (Week 3) |
| Su Lisheng 苏立生 | | Safe | Eliminated (9th) | Eliminated (Week 3) |
| Lokey 低调 | Safe | | Eliminated (10th) | Eliminated (Week 3) |
| Zhao Xiaoxi 赵小熙 | | Safe | Eliminated (11th) | Eliminated (Week 3) |
| Yutian 羽田 | Safe | | Eliminated (12th) | Eliminated (Week 3) |
| Vinida 万妮达 | | Eliminated | Eliminated (Week 2) | |
| Wang Chuang 王闯 | | Eliminated | Eliminated (Week 2) | |
| Yang Bo 杨搏 | | Eliminated | Eliminated (Week 2) | |
| Yao Xi 姚希 | | Eliminated | Eliminated (Week 2) | |
| Karen Lam 林恺伦 | Eliminated | Eliminated (Week 1) | | |
| Pu Xiang 朴翔 | Eliminated | Eliminated (Week 1) | | |
| Zeng Minjie 曾敏杰 | Eliminated | Eliminated (Week 1) | | |
| Zheng Jiawen 郑迦文 | Eliminated | Eliminated (Week 1) | | |

=== Team ===
Artist's info

- Artist from Team Harlem
- Artist from Team Wang Feng
- Artist from Team Na Ying
- Artist from Team Jay

Result details

- Winner
- Runner-up
- Third place
- Fourth place
- Fifth place
- Sixth place
- Artist was saved by coach and won the "coach's save" round
- Artist was saved by coach but lost the "coach's save" round
- Artist was eliminated
- Artist did not perform

| Artist | Week 1 | Week 2 | Week 3 | Finals |
|---|---|---|---|---|
| Nathan Hartono 向洋 | Advanced | | Advanced (1st) | Runner-up |
| Lokey 低调 | Advanced | | Eliminated (10th) | |
| Yutian 羽田 | Advanced | | Eliminated (12th) | |
| Pu Xiang 朴翔 | Eliminated | | | |
| Zeng Minjie 曾敏杰 | Eliminated | | | |
| Jiang Dunhao 蒋敦豪 | Advanced | | Advanced (4th) | Winner |
| Xu Geyang 徐歌阳 | Advanced | | Advanced (3rd) | Fourth place |
| Liu Wentian 刘文天 | Advanced | | Eliminated (7th) | |
| Karen Lam 林恺伦 | Eliminated | | | |
| Zheng Jiawen 郑迦文 | Eliminated | | | |
| Wang Chenrui 汪晨蕊 | | Advanced | Advanced (2nd) | Third place |
| Jeryl Lee 李佩玲 | | Advanced | Advanced (5th) | Sixth place |
| Su Lisheng 苏立生 | | Advanced | Eliminated (9th) | |
| Vinida 万妮达 | | Eliminated | | |
| Yang Bo 杨搏 | | Eliminated | | |
| Yang Meina 杨美娜 | | Advanced | Advanced (6th) | Fifth place |
| Jike Hao 吉克皓 | | Advanced | Eliminated (8th) | |
| Zhao Xiaoxi 赵小熙 | | Advanced | Eliminated (11th) | |
| Wang Chuang 王闯 | | Eliminated | | |
| Yao Xi 姚希 | | Eliminated | | |

== Reception ==
=== CSM52 ratings ===
| Episode | | Original airdate | Production | Time slot (UTC+8) | Rating | Share | Ranking | Source |
|---|---|---|---|---|---|---|---|---|
| 1 | "The Blind Auditions Premiere" | 15 July 2016 | 101 | Friday 9:10 p.m. | 3.843 | 12.72 | 1 | |
| 2 | "The Blind Auditions, Part 2" | 22 July 2016 | 102 | Friday 9:10 p.m. | 3.220 | 11.04 | 1 | |
| 3 | "The Blind Auditions, Part 3" | 29 July 2016 | 103 | Friday 9:10 p.m. | 3.413 | 12.44 | 1 | |
| 4 | "The Blind Auditions, Part 4" | 5 August 2016 | 104 | Friday 9:10 p.m. | 3.554 | 13.01 | 1 | |
| 5 | "The Blind Auditions End" | 12 August 2016 | 105 | Friday 9:10 p.m. | 3.334 | 11.78 | 1 | |
| 6 | "The Fightings – Team Wang Feng" | 19 August 2016 | 106 | Friday 9:10 p.m. | 2.832 | 9.81 | 1 | |
| 7 | "The Fightings – Team Jay" | 26 August 2016 | 107 | Friday 9:10 p.m. | 3.238 | 11.82 | 1 | |
| 8 | "The Fightings – Team Harlem" | 2 September 2016 | 108 | Friday 9:10 p.m. | 2.859 | 10.08 | 1 | |
| 9 | "The Fightings – Team Na Ying" | 9 September 2016 | 109 | Friday 9:10 p.m. | 2.661 | 10.13 | 1 | |
| 10 | "The Mid-Autumn Special" | 15 September 2016 | 110 | Thursday 9:10 p.m. | 1.210 | 4.06 | 2 | |
| 11 | "The Cross Fightings – Team Jay & Team Wang Feng" | 16 September 2016 | 111 | Friday 9:10 p.m. | 2.422 | 9.17 | 1 | |
| 12 | "The Cross Fightings – Team Na Ying & Team Harlem" | 23 September 2016 | 112 | Friday 9:10 p.m. | 2.757 | 10.68 | 1 | |
| 13 | "The Top 12 Playoffs" | 30 September 2016 | 113 | Friday 9:10 p.m. | 2.611 | 9.37 | 1 | |
| 14 | "The National Day Special" | 3 October 2016 | 114 | Monday 9:10 p.m. | 0.981 | 4.21 | 1 | |
| 15 | "The Live Finals, Prelude" | 7 October 2016 | 115 | Friday 8:00 p.m. | 0.924 | 2.61 | 5 | |
| 15 | "The Live Finals, Round 1" | 7 October 2016 | 115 | Friday 8:00 p.m. | 3.225 | 9.34 | 2 | |
| 15 | "The Live Finals, Round 2" | 7 October 2016 | 115 | Friday 8:00 p.m. | 3.956 | 16.05 | 1 | |

== Controversy and criticism ==
On the day of the finals, as voting by the media commenced to determine the winner, host Hua Shao had announced multiple times that the number of judges who were to cast their ballots was 81. The judges, said to be industry and media professionals, were invited on stage to drop their vote in two ballot boxes. The boxes scanned each vote cast and the vote count was updated 'live' on a large screen. As Hartono took the lead at first by nine votes, organisers decided to take a two-minute commercial break after detecting a computer glitch. Not too long after the show had recommenced, Jiang caught up, and both were neck to neck since. By the time the vote tally reached 81, Hartono appeared to be leading Jiang by five votes.

Had that been the case, Hartono would have stood a greater chance at being the first non-Chinese citizen to win the competition, and the first Singaporean to do so. However, the number of votes continued to increase, until eventually Jiang overtook Hartono with 47 votes to 45 – bringing the total number of votes to 92. It had also been reported that Jiang's decisive 46th and 47th votes were made by the same voter – as was caught on camera.

Many viewers, especially supporters of Hartono, took to social media to voice their disapproval over the voting process. Among Singaporean fans, some speculated that the contest was rigged, while others simply congratulated Hartono for having come so far as a foreign participant. Hartono was the first Singaporean to have made it past the blind auditions, since all of Singapore's representatives for seasons 3 and 4 of The Voice of China – Jeremy Teng, Alfred Sim and Tay Kewei – had been unable to do so. He was also the first Singaporean to make it to the semi-finals and to the finals; his second-place finish was the highest a Singaporean (and any contestant who is not a citizen of China) has clinched in the competition so far.

In spite of this, Hartono's mentor Chou said in an interview with Sina.com after the competition that he was pleased with all aspects of the show, but joked that "the media were dizzy from the cold [weather], so maybe they voted wrongly." Hartono himself told Singaporean daily The Straits Times that he was not at all disappointed by the results. In a subsequent post on Facebook the next afternoon, he said, "Everybody has been asking me about my feelings towards the results. Well here they are: in short, I'm not bothered one bit. I couldn't have been happier to even be included in the finals. To then compete in the top two? That's just insane."

On the other hand, Jiang told Sina.com that he was just "dazed" after his win. He had expected either Hartono or Xu to be the champion, adding that there was "much he could learn" from Hartono. Asked whether the result was rigged because he has signed a contract with the producers, he said, "Yes, the company has given me a contract. To me, a boy from a Xinjiang border town, there was nothing shady. I had nothing. To get where I am today, besides my hard work, and my mentor's help, a large part was due to luck."

=== Alleged machine error ===
On 11 October 2016, four days after the grand finals, it was reported on The Straits Times that a machine error allegedly caused the mix-up.

While the producer of the show himself has not commented on the discrepancy, sources close to the show have blamed a machine error, and confirmed that there were indeed only 81 judges. "One swipe on the voting machine is one vote," claimed the source. "We didn't expect that when a swipe took a long time to be detected, the voting machine would read it again." The system did not limit one person to one vote and due to the glitch, 11 more votes were swiped in total.

The source also claimed that Jiang's "popularity with the audience" was key to his defeating Hartono.
