= Ge Huijie =

Chinese model (born 1987)

Ge Huijie / 葛荟婕
- Pronunciation: [kɤ̀ xwêɪtɕjě]
- Born: 葛荟婕 (pinyin: Gě Huìjié); 22 February 1987 (age 39); Jinhua, Zhejiang
- Occupation: Model
- Height: 177 cm (5 ft 9 1/2 in)
- Awards: NICE cup

Ge Huijie / 葛荟婕 (born February 22, 1987) is a Chinese model. In 2002, she won the NICE cup, and was runner-up in 2004 at the Pierre Cardin International Model Contest. At 17, she entered a relationship with Wang Feng, a Chinese rock musician, breaking up two years later. She has also acted in some films and television series, and was featured on the cover of Marie Claire magazine.

== Early life and career ==
Ge was born in Jinhua, a city in central Zhejiang province. Ge says she was extremely rebellious as a youth, having run away from school in the seventh grade following a dispute with her mother. In 2002, she won the NICE cup and was runner-up at the 2004 Pierre Cardin International Model Contest. She was also featured on the cover of Marie Claire magazine. At age 17, she entered a relationship with Wang Feng, with whom she has one child. They broke up two years later; she stated she was too young for a serious relationship at the time. Ge has acted in some productions. In 2010, she starred in Youzhong, a film directed by Zhang Yuan. Ge starred in the Chinese reality television series Mood for Love in 2012.
