= When Ghost Meets Zombie =

2019 Singaporean romantic comedy film

- Film poster
- Directed by: Han Yew Kwang
- Starring: Nathan Hartono; Ferlyn Wong
- Music by: Nathan Hartono and Ferlyn Wong
- Production companies: Clover Films; Wawa Pictures; Shining Entertainment Investment; Artistes Marketing Asia; AC Music Entertainment
- Distributed by: Clover Films; Wawa Pictures
- Release date: 14 February 2019
- Running time: 107 minutes
- Country: Singapore
- Language: Mandarin

When Ghost Meets Zombie (Chinese: 女鬼爱上尸) is a 2019 Singaporean Mandarin-language romantic comedy film directed by Han Yew Kwang. The film tells the story of a male zombie who is forced by a female ghost to join a male pageant competition, in order to fulfil her own pageant dreams. It is released on 14 February 2019 in Singapore, and 18 April 2019 in Malaysia.

The film stars Nathan Hartono and Ferlyn Wong, both playing their first lead roles in their careers.

== Synopsis ==
The film tells the story of a male zombie named Pong who becomes a mechanical and aimless zombie. One day, he meets a free-spirited female ghost named Zhen Zhen. Hilarious drama unfolds when Zhen Zhen possesses Pong to realise her dream of winning a beauty pageant and forces him to join the male pageant competition.

== Cast ==
- Nathan Hartono as Pong
- Ferlyn Wong as Zhen Zhen
- Fann Wong as Meng Na
- Jesseca Liu as Bai Bai
- Jeremy Chan as Lai Lai
- Gurmit Singh as Priest
- Andie Chen as Xiao Liang
- Kate Pang as Joe
- Suhaimi Yusof as Boat Man
- Yvonne Lim as Judge
- Dennis Chew as Hell Manager
- Jack Neo as "Mr Perfect" audition judge
- Shaun Chen as "Mr Perfect" audition judge
- Chen Tianwen as Village Head
- Zheng Geping as Gym Trainer
- Lee Teng as Host

== Music ==
The official theme song, "等" (lit. 'Wait') was released Warner Music Singapore's YouTube channel, sung by Nathan and Ferlyn.
