= First (Ferlyn G EP) =

EP by Ferlyn G
- Released: (Singapore) January 2, 2015
- Recorded: 2014, Singapore
- Genre: K-pop, Mandopop
- Label: Alpha Entertainment iGlobalStar

Singles from First
- 1. "Luv Talk" Released: January 2, 2015; 2. "心放开" Released: January 2, 2015

'First' is the debut EP of Singaporean singer, Ferlyn G. It consists of a total of three tracks and was released on January 2, 2015.

== Background ==
In 2014, Ferlyn announced that she will be leaving Skarf and releasing a solo EP in 2015 before Chinese New Year. After a series of teasers, the EP was released on January 2, 2015, during a press conference at Bugis+ in Singapore. The music video for both Xīn fàng kāi (心放开) and Luv Talk was released through iGlobalStar's official YouTube channel on January 2, 2015.

== Composition ==
Ferlyn worked with various well known composers and singers such as Gen Neo from Noizebank and Mint from Tiny-G. The promotional tracks, Luv Talk and Xīn fàng kāi (心放开) is a fun pop tune and is about having a crush while the second track, Bùjiàn bú sàn (不見不散) about the experience during a breakup.

== Music video ==
The music video for the promotional track, Luv Talk and Xīn fàng kāi (心放开) begin on a deceptively melancholy note with a teary Ferlyn perched on a bridge and dramatic piano instrumental playing behind her, the song soon ramps up the atmosphere with a full brass tone and hip rhythm. The story flashes back to an unpleasant conversation Ferlyn has with an unknown man. However, after being down, she transforms herself into a new self with a change in make up and outfit.

== Track list ==
※ Bold track title means it is the title track in the album.

No.	Title	Lyrics	Music	Arrangement	Length
1.	"心放開" (Open Up Your Heart)	Colin Qi 祁哲泉	Gen Neo (Noizebank)	Gen Neo (Noizebank)	3:07
2.	"不見不散" (I'll See You There)	Ho Jie Ying 何潔瑩	Jim Lim 林倛玉	Clement 楊熙, Jim Lim 林倛玉	5:09
3.	"Luv Talk" (ft. Mint of Tiny-G)	Lee Dong-eun	Gen Neo (Noizebank)	Gen Neo (Noizebank)	3:05
Total length:					11:21
