= Skarf =

South Korean girl group

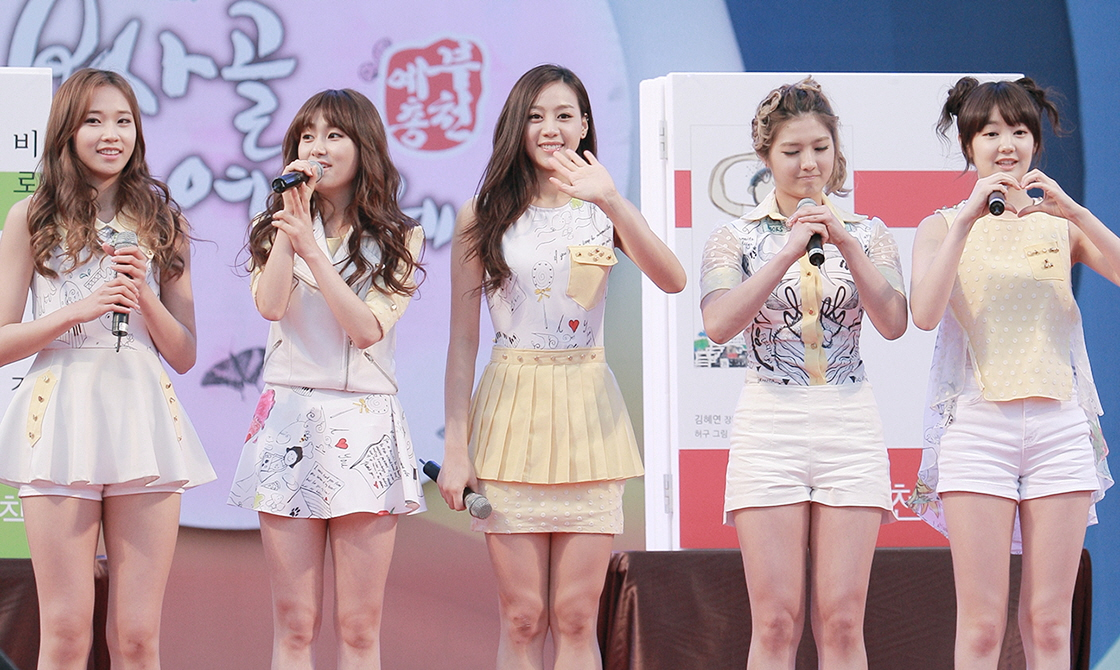
- Skarf in May 2013

Background information
- Origin: Seoul, South Korea
- Genre: K-pop
- Years active: 2011–2014
- Labels: Alpha Entertainment Korea; CJ E&M
- Past members: Tasha; Sol; Ferlyn; Jenny; JooA; Hana

Skarf (Korean: 스카프; stylized as SKarf) was a South Korean girl group formed by Alpha Entertainment. The meaning behind the group's name is based on the word "scarf". The S stands for Singapore while the C was switched out with the K for Korea.

On August 14, 2012, they made their official debut and released their first self-titled album "Skarf". To get their name known by public, the rookie girl group Skarf starred in a new reality show on MBC MUSIC titled "Oh! My Skarf".

On December 30, 2012, Sol left Skarf citing personal reasons and two new members, JooA and Hana, joined the group. On September 16, 2014, it was announced that Ferlyn will be leaving Skarf and will release a solo mandarin EP by 2015. The last official lineup consisted of Tasha, Jenny, JooA and Hana. The group was quietly disbanded soon after by the end of 2014.

== History ==
=== Pre-debut ===
From 9 to 11 December 2010, JYP Entertainment and Alpha Entertainment held auditions in Singapore and Hong Kong and it was during that time that Ferlyn, Tasha and Elaine were recruited into Alpha Entertainment with other finalists who passed the auditions. Ferlyn, Elaine and Tasha underwent two years of intensive training in South Korea and during late 2011, Elaine Yuki had dropped out of the group for medical reasons and also because the training was too tough. Alpha's Chief Executive Officer Alan Chan stated that the girls would be groomed together with other Koreans to form a girl group debuting in this year.

=== 2012: Debut with "Skarf" and "Oh! My Skarf" ===
On August 8, 2012, Skarf released their first teaser for their title song "Oh! Dance" through Alpha Entertainment's official YouTube channel. On August 9, 2012, the individual teasers of the members was then released to introduce each of the members.

On August 10, 2012, it was announced that Skarf would have their own reality program on MBC Music titled "Oh! My Skarf", the show is scheduled to air starting on August 11 at 7 PM KST. The show will reveal the pre-debut lives of the girl group members as they prepare for their upcoming debut.

After releasing the third music video teaser for their title song on August 12, 2012, the music video for "Oh! Dance" was released one day after and on August 14, 2012, Skarf held their debut showcase in Seoul.

On August 17, 2012, Skarf started their promotions on Music Bank with their title song "Oh! Dance", it was also the first music program that the girls had ever performed on in South Korea.

Sol left the group for personal reasons and the group announced on December 30, 2012, that they will make a comeback with the addition of Korean member JooA and Japanese member Hana during February 2013.

=== 2013: "Luv Virus", Singapore showcase ===
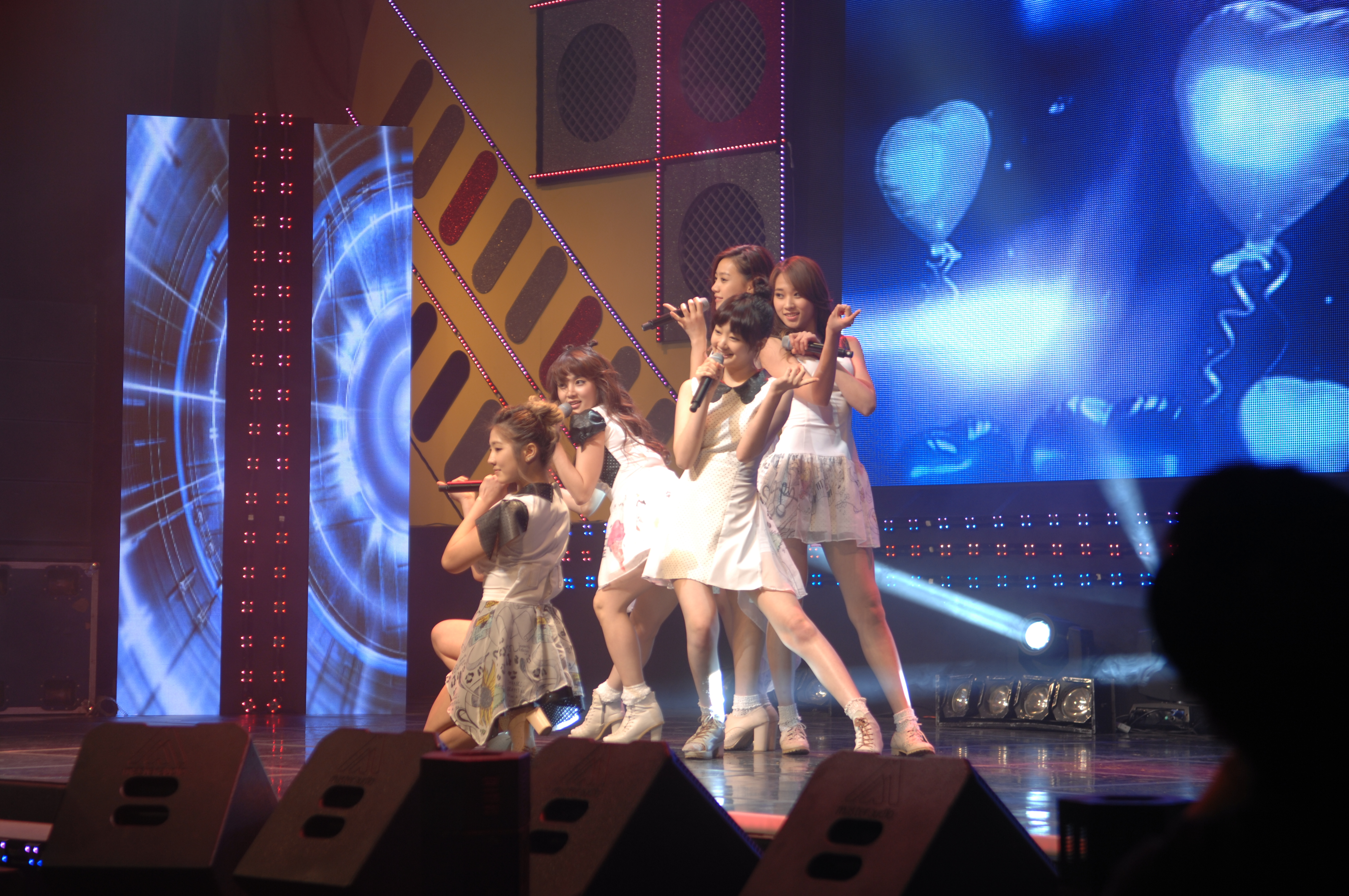
Skarf at the K-Force Special Show

On May 19, it was revealed that Skarf would be making a comeback with their first mini album Luv Virus on 28 May. On 28 May, the video teasers of each member of Skarf for the title song Luv Virus was released through Alpha Entertainment's official YouTube channel. On May 31, 2013, the full music video for the title track Luv Virus was uploaded onto their official YouTube channel, marking their first music video filmed as a five-member group instead of the four-member group previously. Their mini album titled Luv Virus was also released on the same day.

On July 3, Skarf announced that they would be visiting Singapore to hold a one-day restaurant food event. Skarf themselves would be preparing the food that would be sold for that day and stated that the earnings from the event will be donated to charity. It was also announced that they will be holding a fan sign on August 10 and on August 11, they will be holding their showcase titled “Dreams Come True” at Kallang Theatre.

=== 2014: Ferlyn's departure and disbandment ===
On September 16, 2014, Ferlyn left Skarf. The group was quietly disbanded soon after, and later in 2015, its brand name was reportedly sold to South Korean entertainment company CJ E&M at an undisclosed sum.

== Former members ==
- Tasha (Korean: 타샤) - Leader
- Sol (Korean: 솔)
- Ferlyn (Korean: 페린)
- Jenny (Korean: 제니)
- JooA (Korean: 주아)
- Hana (Korean: 하나)

== Discography ==
=== Single albums ===
Title	Details	Peak positions	Sales
Title	Details	KOR	Sales
Skarf	Released: August 13, 2012; Label: Alpha Entertainment; Format: CD, Digital Download	29	—
"—" denotes a recording that did not chart or was not released in that territory.

=== Extended plays ===
Title	Details	Peak positions	Sales
Title	Details	KOR	Sales
Luv Virus	Released: May 31, 2013; Label: Alpha Entertainment; Format: CD, Digital Download	19	816+
"—" denotes a recording that did not chart or was not released in that territory.

== Filmography ==
=== Television ===
Year	Network	Title	Role	Remarks
2012	MBC	Oh! My Skarf	Reality show about Skarf's lives before debut	
2013	MBC	Gangnam Feel Dance	Leader Tasha starred on this show.	
