= Brave Heart (Wang Feng album) =

Studio album by Wang Feng
- Released: June 26, 2007
- Recorded: 2006–2007
- Genre: Rock; Mandopop
- Label: Music Nation Group

Wang Feng chronology
A Blooming Life (2005)	Brave Heart (2007)	Belief Flies in the Wind (2009)

Brave Heart (Chinese: 勇敢的心; Yonggan de xin) is the fifth studio album by Chinese rock musician Wang Feng. It was released on June 26, 2007, through Music Nation Group.

== Background and recording ==
Wang revealed that the recording of Brave Heart, which began in early 2006, spanned almost 10 months. He dedicated himself to writing nearly every day, writing over 60 songs in the process. Of those, only 11 tracks made the final cut for the album. The composition of the album was written with a more straightforward mindset, both musically and lyrically. Wang felt that since 2007 marked his twelfth year in the rock music industry, Brave Heart represented a self-reflection of his journey.

== Accolades ==
The album was awarded the best lyrics prize at Shanghai Media & Entertainment Group's Dongfang Fengyun (zh:东方风云榜) awards.

== Track listing ==
All music is composed by Wang Feng and Jia Yinan.

No.	Title	Length
1.	"哭泣的拳头" (Crying Fist)
2.	"勇敢的心" (Brave Heart)
3.	"眩晕" (Dizziness)
4.	"觉醒" (Awakening)
5.	"无名之辈" (Unknown Persion)
6.	"挥挥手" (Wave)
7.	"我的路" (My Path)
8.	"边走边唱" (Singing and Walking)
9.	"空的发狂" (Empty)
10.	"我如此爱你" (I Love You So Much)
11.	"北京北京" (Beijing Beijing)
