= Oh! Dance =

- Cover of Skarf

Single by Skarf
- Released: August 16, 2012
- Genre: K-pop, dance-pop
- Length: 13:14
- Label: Alpha Entertainment
- Songwriters: Jungyup, Ecobridge

Skarf singles chronology
"Oh! Dance" (2012)	"'Luv Virus'" (2013)

Music video
- "Oh! Dance" on YouTube

"Oh! Dance" is a song, and also the first and also the debut single, of Singaporean-Korean girl group, Skarf. The single has a total of four tracks, including "Oh! Dance". It was released on August 13, 2012.

== Background and release ==
The single contains four tracks and the title track of the single "Oh! Dance". It was revealed that singer Jungyup of Brown Eyed Soul, and composer Eco Bridge are the composers for the single's title track and it was also the first time both have ever worked with a girl group.

The music video was released on August 11, 2012, through Alpha Entertainment's official YouTube channel.

== Promotion ==
On August 17, 2012, Skarf started their promotions on Music Bank with their title song "Oh! Dance", it was also the first music program that the girls had ever performed on in South Korea.

== Track list ==
No.	Title	Lyrics	Music	Arrangement	Length
1.	"Oh! Dance"	Jungyup, Ecobridge	Jungyup, Ecobridge	Jungyup, Ecobridge	3:19
2.	"My Love"	Noh Joo-hwan, Iggy, Yongbae	Iggy, Yongbae	Iggy, Yongbae	3:38
3.	"Oh! Dance" (Instrumental)		Jungyup, Ecobridge		3:19
4.	"My Love" (Instrumental)		Iggy, Yongbae		3:38
Total length:					13:14

== Chart ==
Chart	Peak position
Gaon Weekly Album Chart	29
