= Wang Feng (singer) =

Chinese rock musician and composer (born 1971)

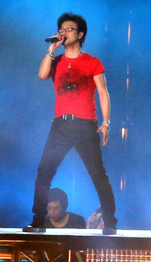
- Wang in 2015
- Born: 29 June 1971 (age 55); Beijing, China
- Education: Central Conservatory of Music
- Occupations: Singer-songwriter; composer; director
- Years active: 1997–present
- Spouses: Qi Dan (齐丹) (m. 2003; div. 2004) Kang Zuoru (康作如) (m. 2007; div. 2013) Zhang Ziyi 章子怡 (m. 2015; div. 2023)
- Children: 4
- Musical career
- Genres: Rock; folk
- Instruments: Vocals; guitar; violin; piano
- Label: Rock Forward

Wang Feng (Chinese: 汪峰; pinyin: Wāng Fēng; born 29 June 1971) is a Chinese singer. He is the founder and frontman of the rock band No. 43 Baojia Street (鲍家街43号). After releasing two albums with the band, he signed a solo contract with Warner Music. With hit songs such as "Flying Higher" (2004), "Blooming Life" (2005), "In the Spring" (2009), and "Exist" (2011), Wang became one of the leading rock musicians in China. His 2009 album, Belief Flies in the Wind, earned him the Most Popular Male Singer in China award at Channel V's 14th Chinese Music Awards. Wang also served as a judge on the television shows The Voice of China, and Sing! China.

Wang was the first male mainland Chinese singer to hold a solo concert at the Beijing Workers' Stadium and became the first male singer to perform a solo concert at the Beijing National Stadium. Wang also became the first mainland singer to exceed ¥100 million in annual concert box office revenue for three consecutive years from 2013 to 2015.

== Early life ==
Wang Feng was born in Beijing to a musician's family. Under his father's suggestion, Wang started practicing violin when he was five years old. He attended the middle school attached to the Central Conservatory of Music at the age of eleven. Wang did not understand the purpose of playing the violin or why he had to stay home practising while other kids of his age could play outside. At the age of 14, for the first time in his life, Wang realized the beauty of music through a piece composed by Tchaikovsky. After that experience, Wang decided to pursue music for the rest of his life.

By the age of 17, Wang started listening to rock music. Wang studied at the Central Conservatory of Music majoring in violin and viola. In his college years Wang joined the Chinese Youth Orchestra and performed overseas. In his senior year in college (1994), Wang and his friends formed the band No. 43 Baojia Street.

== Career ==
=== 1997–2000: No. 43 Baojia Street and beginning of solo career ===
Wang Feng and the band No. 43 Baojia Street, which was named after the street address of the Central Conservatory of Music in Beijing. They released their first album in 1997, three years after the band was formed. During these three years the band practiced in a basement in the college and performed in local clubs and bars. To comply with his father's will and to have a stable income, Wang took the offer of the vice concertmaster of the National Ballet of China Symphony Orchestra. However Wang quit the job after a year even with a promotion to the concertmaster position, and put himself completely into Rock music. In the beginning, the band was sponsored by "Xiao Wei" (nickname), an alumnus of the Central Conservatory of Music. Xiao Wei's sponsorship allowed the band to practice and perform. They gradually built up their reputation in Beijing, which led the band to a record deal from Beijing Jingwen Record Co., Ltd on 31 May 1997. The band was not profitable under Xiao Wei's sponsorship. Wang could not even pay his rent at that time. The record deal with Beijing Jingwen Record was an opportunity for the band to officially enter the music business and to solve the money issue. Xiao Wei understood the benefit of the deal for Wang Feng and the whole band. He terminated the sponsorship himself and left Beijing.

Later that year the band made their first studio album, No. 43 Baojia Street (1997). This album included songs like "Little Bird" and "Good Night Beijing", which became famous afterwards. One year later the band made their second album, No. 43 Baojia Street 2 – Storm Approaching (1998). While the albums were sold in the market, the economic issue of the band and Wang himself did not resolve. In other words, the band was not making a profit. Wang decided to terminate the contract with Beijing Jingwen Record. In 2000, the Warner Music Beijing Co., Ltd found Wang Feng and offered him a record deal but not the whole band. Wang signed the contract and put out the album Fireworks (2000) in the same year. The songs from this album were made before the band broke up.

=== 2000–2006: Fireworks, Love is a Happy Bullet, and Crying while Smiling ===
During his years with Warner Music, Wang had the boost of his career. Three albums were made, including Fireworks (2000), Love is a Happy Bullet (2002), and Crying while Smiling (2004). The song Flying Higher, which became very popular in China after release, was included in the album Crying while Smiling. Wang also took care of the entire soundtrack of the movie Beijing Bicycle (2001). In July 2005, Wang ended the five-year contract with Warner Music and started his own independent record label "Feng Sheng Music" (Feng Sheng is the Chinese translation for Feng's voice).

In the same year, Wang released his fourth studio album "Blooming Life" (2005). The song Blooming life, same as the name of the album, became famous quickly after the album was released and became the most downloaded ringtones in some regions in China. In the same album, Wang included another two famous patriotic pieces, Our Dream (我们的梦) and I Love You, China (我爱你，中国). Our Dream became the Beijing Olympic Top 10 Golden Songs; I Love You, China was considered a gift for the success of Shenzhou 6, the second human spaceflight of the People's Republic of China. In 2006, Wang won the "Best Male Singer in China", award at the 6th Top Chinese Music Awards.

=== 2007–2010: Brave Heart and Belief Flies in the Wind ===
In May 2007, Wang made a new record deal with the Hong Kong media company MusicNationGroup. One month later, Wang released his fifth studio album, Brave Heart (2007). Wang claimed to be very satisfied with his work in this album; however, one of the tracks was forced to be taken out by the authority. During the time the album was released, some people on the Internet claimed that the hit song Brave Heart was a copy of the song Crazy from the Canadian pop-punk band Simple Plan. Wang's denied the accusation.

In 2009, after two years since the last album, Wang came back with the Belief Flies in the Wind (2009). The album brought Wang many awards. The song "In the Spring" reached number one on the 23rd of the Chinese Music Chart. In September, the song "Light" took the number one place again on the 32nd of the Chinese Music Chart. On 12 November, the song "When I Miss You" won the number one spot on the 42nd of the Chinese Music Chart. On the 9th Global Chinese Music Awards, the song "In the Spring" won the Best Lyrics award. Wang Feng himself won the Best Producer, and the album Belief Flies in the Wind won the Best Album.

=== 2011–2018: Life Asks for Nothing, Born in Hesitation, The River, and 29, Guoling Lane ===
In 2011, after being signed to Rock Forward Entertainment, Wang Feng released Life Asks for Nothing, the first ever double album in Chinese rock history, which topped a wide variety of charts and earned him nationwide critical acclaim at the major Chinese music awards. The same year Wang Feng became the first-ever Chinese artist who held concerts in grand stadiums twice a year, making him one of very few Chinese rock musicians who enjoyed commercial success and mainstream recognition without discarding its famously rebellious roots.

In 2013, Wang Feng became a judge in The Voice of China Season 2, with Na Ying, Harlem Yu, and A-Mei. He continued as a judge till Season 4. In 2016, Wang Feng became a judge in the first season of the rebranded Sing! China, where he became the winning mentor courtesy of Jiang Dunhao, who finished the winner of the series. Wang did not return for another season.

In 2018, Wang Feng was one of the seven first-round singers taking part in the sixth season of Hunan Television's singing competition, Singer (which was previously named I Am a Singer). He made it to the finals and finished third, behind Hua Chenyu and winner Jessie J.

=== 2019 – present ===
Wang released the album in 2020 on 18 December 2019. His next album, titled Maybe I Can Ignore Death, was released on 24 August 2022. He embarked on the Unfollow Tour in 2021, which held seven shows at different stadiums in China before its conclusion in 2023.

== Personal life ==
Wang married his first wife, Qi Dan, a TV hostess, in 2003, but they divorced the next year. He then began a relationship with model Ge Huijie. They have one daughter, Wang Manxi (born 2005). In 2007, he married his second wife, Kang Zuoru. They have one daughter, Wang Jingyi (born 2012), but they divorced the next year. He married for a third time in 2015 to Chinese actress Zhang Ziyi. They have a daughter (born 2015) and a son (born 2020). Both children were born in the United States. On 23 October 2023, Zhang and Wang announced their divorce. In 2024, he entered into a relationship with Internet influencer Li Qiao.

== Discography ==
Studio albums

- Fireworks (2000)
- Love is a Happy Bullet (2002)
- Crying with Laughter (2004)
- A Blooming Life (2005)
- Brave Heart (2007)
- Belief Flies in the Wind (2009)
- Life Asks for Nothing (2011)
- Born in Hesitation (2013)
- The River (2015)
- 29, Guoling Lane (2017)
- 2020 (2020)
- Maybe I Can Ignore Death (2022)

== Concerts ==
Headlining tours

- Existence Tour (2012–2013)
- Storming Concert Tour (2014–2015)
- The Times Tour (2017–2018)
- Just Like That Tour (2018–2019)
- Unfollow Tour (2021–2023)

Concerts

- Life Asks For Nothing Concert (2011–2012)

== See also ==
- Chinese rock
