= The Weepies discography =

- Studio albums: 5
- Singles: 9
- Music videos: 5
- Tours: 3

The discography of The Weepies, an indie pop-folk band fronted by singer-songwriters Deb Talan and Steve Tannen, contains five studio albums, one extended play and six singles. The Weepies released their first album, Happiness, through an independent label. After signing with Nettwerk, they released their second album in 2006, Say I Am You. In that same year, they released a Live Session (The Weepies EP) featuring songs from "Say I Am You", four songs from Deb and Steve's previous work, and one song from their future album "Hideaway'". In 2008, they released their third studio album Hideaway. In 2010, they released their fourth studio album, Be My Thrill. In 2015, they released their fifth studio album, Sirens.

== Albums ==
=== Studio albums ===
Year	Album details	Peak chart positions				Sales
Year	Album details	US	US Heat	US Rock	US Rock	Sales
2003	Happiness: Released: November 29, 2003; Label: Independent	—	—	—	—	
2006	Say I Am You: Released: March 7, 2006; Label: Nettwerk	—	41	—	—	
2008	Hideaway: Released: April 22, 2008; Label: Nettwerk	31	—	—	—	
2010	Be My Thrill: Released: August 31, 2010; Label: Nettwerk	34	—	11	3	US: 50,000
2015	Sirens: Released: April 28, 2015; Label: Nettwerk	103	—	13	3	
"—" denotes releases that did not chart.

=== Extended plays ===
Year	Album details
2006	Live Session (The Weepies EP): Released: August 15, 2006; Format: Digital download

== Singles ==
Year	Single	Album
2006	"World Spins Madly On"	Say I Am You
2006	"Nobody Knows Me at All"	Say I Am You
2008	"Hideaway"	Hideaway
2008	"Can't Go Back Now"	Hideaway
2010	"I Was Made for Sunny Days": (featuring Colbie Caillat on backing vocals)	Be My Thrill
2010	"Be My Thrill"	Be My Thrill
2010	"Be My Honeypie"	Be My Thrill
2011	"Red Red Rose"	Be My Thrill
2015	"Sirens"	Sirens
2019	"Backstreets"	Born to Uke

== Album appearances ==
Year	Title	Length	Album
2010	"Same Changes"	3:21	Morning Glory
2014	"Mend"	3:21	Wish I Was Here
