= Tanya Chua discography =

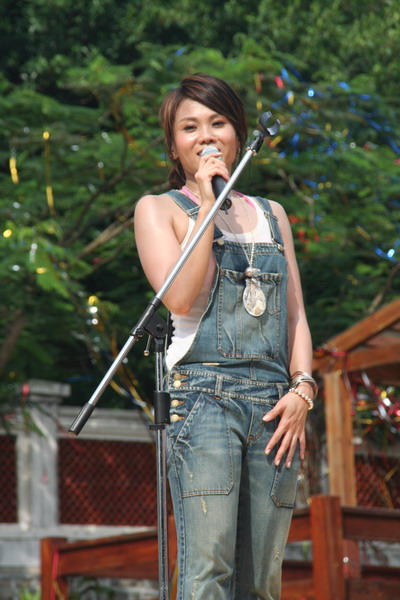
- Chua in 2006
- Studio albums: 17
- EPs: 1
- Compilation albums: 2
- Live albums: 1
- Soundtrack albums: 1

The discography of Singaporean singer Tanya Chua consists of 17 studio albums, including 12 in Mandarin and 5 in English, 1 extended play, 2 compilation albums, and 1 live album.

== Studio albums ==
=== Mandarin studio albums ===
List of Mandarin studio albums, with release date, label, and sales shown
Title	Album details	Peak chart positions		Sales
Title	Album details	TWN	TWN CHN	Sales
Tanya	Released: 8 January 1999; Label: Polygram Records Taiwan; Formats: CD, cassette	14	—	TWN: 200,000; SGP: 8,000
Remember	Released: 23 March 2000; Label: Universal Music Taiwan; Formats: CD, cassette	—	—	TWN: 60,000
I Do Believe	Released: 13 April 2001; Label: Universal Music Taiwan; Formats: CD, cassette	—	—	TWN: 60,000
Stranger	Released: 5 June 2003; Label: Warner Music Taiwan; Formats: CD, cassette	—	—	TWN: 100,000
Amphibian	Released: 5 January 2005; Label: Warner Music Taiwan; Formats: CD, cassette	—	—	TWN: 60,000
Goodbye & Hello	Released: 19 October 2007; Label: AsiaMuse Entertainment; Formats: CD, digital download	1	1	
If You See Him	Released: 19 August 2009; Label: AsiaMuse Entertainment; Formats: CD, digital download	11	10	
Sing It Out of Love	Released: 18 November 2011; Label: AsiaMuse Entertainment; Formats: CD, 2CD, digital download	—	7	
Angel vs. Devil	Released: 24 September 2013; Label: AsiaMuse Entertainment; Formats: CD, digital download, streaming	11	8	
Aphasia	Released: 13 November 2015; Label: AsiaMuse Entertainment; Formats: CD, digital download, streaming	—	—	
Kisses for the World	Released: 21 December 2018; Label: Universal Music Taiwan; Formats: CD, digital download, streaming	—	—	
Depart	Released: 13 August 2021; Label: Universal Music Taiwan; Formats: CD, digital download, streaming	—	—	

=== English studio albums ===
List of English studio albums, with release date, label, and sales shown
Title	Album details	Peak chart positions
Title	Album details	TWN
Bored	Released: 1 August 1997; Label: Tian Ya Music, Universal China; Formats: CD, cassette	—
Luck	Released: 1 December 1999; Label: Tian Ya Music, Universal China; Formats: CD, cassette	—
Secret Lavender	Released: 21 January 2002; Label: S2S Records; Formats: CD, cassette	—
Jupiter	Released: 1 July 2002; Label: Tian Ya Music, Universal China; Formats: CD, cassette	—
Just Say So	Released: 18 November 2011; Label: AsiaMuse Entertainment; Formats: CD, 2CD, digital download	11

== Compilation albums ==
Title	Album details
Tacit Understanding: New+Best Collection	Released: 17 December 2001; Label: Universal Music; Formats: CD, cassette
T-Time Tanya Chua Best Selected	Released: 2 June 2006; Label: Warner Music Taiwan; Formats: CD, cassette

== Soundtrack albums ==
Title	Album details
Imperfect Us: Original Soundtrack	Released: 12 April 2024; Label: Tian Ya Music; Formats: Digital download, streaming

== Extended plays ==
Title	Album details
Where I Belong	Released: 23 July 2001; Label: Yellow Music, Universal Music; Formats: CD, cassette

== Live albums ==
Title	Album details
My Space Live Concert	Released: 28 July 2008; Label: AsiaMuse Entertainment; Formats: CD, DVD

== Singles ==
Title	Year	Album
"All Right"	1999	Luck
"Treasure the World"	2003	Jupiter
"Purple" (紫)	2017	Non-album single
"Nightglow"	2018	Kisses for the World
"Bluebirds"	2021	Depart
"Photographs"	2021	Depart
"Love Will Empower Your Life"	2023	Non-album single
