= Hideaway (The Weepies album) =

Studio album by The Weepies
- Released: April 22, 2008
- Genre: Folk-pop
- Length: 44:47
- Label: Nettwerk
- Producers: Deb Talan, Steve Tannen

The Weepies chronology
Say I Am You (2006)	Hideaway (2008)	Be My Thrill (2010)

Professional ratings
Review scores
Source	Rating
AbsolutePunk	(61%)
AllMusic	3.5/5 stars
Patrol	(7.8/10)

Hideaway is the third studio album by The Weepies. It was released on April 22, 2008 by Nettwerk. The album debuted at number 31 on the US Billboard 200 chart, selling 14,000 copies in its first week.

The song "All This Beauty" was featured on the Sex and the City: Original Motion Picture Soundtrack in 2008. The song "Can't Go Back Now" was featured in the 2009 film Adam, along with the shows Life Unexpected, Pretty Little Liars, and The Fosters. The song "All Good Things" was written for Mandy Moore's 2007 album Wild Hope.

== Track listing ==
All tracks are written by Deb Talan and Steve Tannen, except where noted.

No.	Title	Length
1.	"Can't Go Back Now"	2:17
2.	"Orbiting"	2:55
3.	"Hideaway"	2:46
4.	"Wish I Could Forget"	2:56
5.	"All Good Things" (Deb Talan, Steve Tannen, Mandy Moore)	2:55
6.	"Little Bird"	3:33
7.	"Antarctica"	3:14
8.	"How You Survived the War"	3:35
9.	"Not Dead Yet"	3:19
10.	"Old Coyote"	3:39
11.	"Just Blue"	4:04
12.	"Lighting Candles"	3:07
13.	"Takes So Long"	3:06
14.	"All This Beauty"	3:19

== Personnel ==
=== Musicians ===
- Deb Talan - vocals, guitar, keyboard, percussion
- Steve Tannen - vocals, guitar, keyboard, percussion
- Frank Lenz - drums, keyboard
- Steve Walsh - guitar
- Whynot Jansveld - bass, electric guitar
- Meghan Toohey - electric guitar
- Brad Gordon - keyboard, horns
- John Delay - Keyboard
- Oliver Kraus - strings

=== Technical ===
- Joe Ross - mixing
- Matt Searle - assistant mixing engineer

== Charts ==
Chart (2008)	Peak position
US Billboard 200	31
US Alternative Albums	8
US Digital Albums	131
