= Wish I Was Here (soundtrack) =

2014 soundtrack albums

Two soundtrack albums were released for the 2014 film Wish I Was Here, directed by and starring Zach Braff along with Donald Faison, Josh Gad, Pierce Gagnon, Ashley Greene, Kate Hudson, Joey King, Jim Parsons, and Mandy Patinkin. The first, Wish I Was Here (Music from the Motion Picture), features songs heard in the film, along with three original songs, and was released on July 15, 2014, under the Columbia Records label. The second, Wish I Was Here (Original Score), features the original score composed by Rob Simonsen, and was released through Miles of Lions Records on September 9, 2014.

== Wish I Was Here (Music from the Motion Picture) ==
Wish I Was Here (Music from the Motion Picture)

Soundtrack album by various artists
- Released: July 15, 2014
- Genres: Alternative rock; alternative pop; indie rock; indie folk; indie pop
- Length: 56:26
- Label: Columbia
- Producer: Zach Braff

Singles from Wish I Was Here (Music from the Motion Picture)
- 1. "So Now What" Released: June 20, 2014; 2. "Heavenly Father" Released: June 30, 2014; 3. "Wish I Was Here" Released: July 6, 2014

=== Background ===
Braff, who understood the impact of the platinum-selling soundtrack of Garden State (2004), wanted his soundtrack to be more than a mixtape. Owing to the rise in music streaming and downloads, especially after iTunes and that music stores becoming nascent, Braff wanted to utilize "original content" which was more "special and unique to the film". Hence, he asked some of the band members from his favorite bands, such as the Shins, Bon Iver and Coldplay to watch the film and then write a song as a piece of art inspired from the project being both emotional and whimsical.

The Shins' wrote an original song "So Now What" after Braff's perusal to James Mercer to create a number in the spirit of their maiden studio album Oh, Inverted World (2001). Braff precisely said, "We had a wonderful coming out party together in that Garden State not only broke me as a filmmaker but I think exposed a lot of the world to the Shins". Braff then collaborated with Coldplay frontman Chris Martin to write the title track, and also felt that the song should be sung by a female artist as it is pictured on Kate Hudson. Braff and Martin simultaneously singled out on Cat Power to record the vocals, and they agreed to record the song as they liked the film very much.

Bon Iver wrote an original song "Heavenly Father" for their film, while their song "Holocene" from their eponymous studio album also made it way into the film as well as the album. The album also featured a commentary of the tracks by Braff, providing descriptions to each of the songs. The album also featured a live recording of "Cherry Wine" by Hozier and other pre-existing music being assembled for the film by supervisor Mary Ramos and editor Myron Kerstein, who had assembled several songs for the film; except for 12 of the tracks, many of them did not get included in the soundtrack.

=== Release ===
The soundtrack was announced on June 17, 2014, featuring 15 tracks, with the opening track "So Now What" by the Shins was released as a single on June 20. Bon Iver's original song "Heavenly Father" was released on June 30, with an accompanying music video featuring stills from the film and the band's musical performance released along with the single. Coldplay's title track was released on July 6. The album was released on July 15, three days prior to the film's release through Columbia Records.

=== Track listing ===
No.	Title	Writer(s)	Producer(s)	Length
1.	"So Now What" (The Shins)	James Mercer	Richard Swift	3:17
2.	"Broke Window" (Gary Jules)	Gary Jules	Michael Andrews; Gary Jules	3:44
3.	"The Mute" (Radical Face)	Ben Cooper	Ben Cooper	4:53
4.	"Cherry Wine" (Live) (Hozier)	Andrew Hozier-Byrne	Hozier	4:00
5.	"Holocene" (Bon Iver)	Justin Vernon	Justin Vernon	5:36
6.	"The Shining" (Badly Drawn Boy)	Damon Gough	Ken Nelson	4:01
7.	"Mexico" (Jump Little Children)	Jay Clifford	Rick Beato	3:58
8.	"Wish I Was Here" (Cat Power and Coldplay)	Coldplay	Daniel Green; Tom Elmhirst (vocal)	3:46
9.	"Wait It Out" (Allie Moss)	Imogen Heap	Chris Kuffner; Allie Moss	3:55
10.	"The Obvious Child" (Paul Simon)	Paul Simon	Paul Simon	4:10
11.	"Breathe In" (Japanese Wallpaper featuring Wafia)	Gabriel Strum	Wafia Al-Rikabi	3:42
12.	"Heavenly Father" (Bon Iver)	Justin Vernon	Justin Vernon	5:09
13.	"Raven's Song" (Aaron Embry)	Aaron Embry	Woody Jackson	4:31
14.	"Mend" (The Weepies)	Deb Talan; Steve Tannen	The Weepies	3:36
15.	"No One to Let You Down" (The Head and the Heart)	The Head and the Heart	Steven Aguilar	5:10
Total length:				59:28

=== Commercial performance ===
Braff acknowledged that the film's soundtrack would not become a platinum-selling album like Garden State considering the changing dynamics in film music and the advent of streaming, adding "selling 1.5 million copies in this day and age is ridiculous [...] People don’t buy music like that anymore." However, he acknowledged that the song "Heavenly Father" and title track, trended on Twitter (now X), which served as the promotional tool for that film.

=== Reception ===
Fred Thomas of AllMusic wrote "Wish I Was Here was framed loosely as a follow-up of sorts to Garden State, offering a similarly toned soundtrack of introspective indie rock and coming-of-age classics". Zach Hollowdel of Under the Radar wrote "Wish I Was Here soundtrack isn’t quite as new as it seems".

=== Charts ===
Chart (2014)	Peak position
UK Compilation Albums (OCC)	74
US Billboard 200	43
US Top Soundtracks (Billboard)	4

== Wish I Was Here (Original Score) ==
Wish I Was Here (Original Score)

Soundtrack album by various artists
- Released: September 9, 2014
- Genre: Film score
- Length: 56:26
- Label: Miles of Lions
- Producer: Rob Simonsen

Rob Simonsen chronology
Chu and Blossom (2014)	Wish I Was Here (2014)	Foxcatcher (2014)

=== Background ===
Rob Simonsen recalled in an interview that Braff had listened to the score he composed for an Apple Inc. commercial and found his musical to suit the narrative perfectly. Simonsen eventually curated a minimalistic piano-driven score to suit the tone of the film. The score was released through Miles of Lions Records on September 9, 2014.

=== Reception ===
James Southall of Movie Wave wrote "Simonsen's music has a very big heart which means the album is captivating".

=== Track listing ===
No.	Title	Length
1.	"Running Through the Woods"	1:40
2.	"The Family Bloom"	1:26
3.	"The Frozen Forest"	1:16
4.	"I'm Excited to Ask Her a Question"	1:54
5.	"The Dark Cliffs of Father Rabbi"	1:04
6.	"Talking to Jesse"	1:23
7.	"I Already Am a Great Matriarch"	1:09
8.	"Shimmering"	2:01
9.	"Sitting on This Rock Here With You"	1:51
10.	"Let Dad Sleep"	1:05
11.	"Fixing the Fence"	1:05
12.	"Swimming in Sunlight"	1:52
13.	"Forward Is the Only Direction We Have"	3:23
Total length:		21:09
