= Golden Melody Award for Best Vocal Recording Album =

Taiwanese music award

- Awarded for: quality engineering for pop vocal albums
- Country: Taiwan
- Presented by: Ministry of Culture
- First award: 2015
- Currently held by: Pleasure (2026)
- Website: gma.tavis.tw

The Golden Melody Award for Best Vocal Recording Album (Chinese: 金曲獎最佳演唱錄音專輯) has been awarded since 1990. From 1990 to 1996 there was an award called Best Recording Album designed to honor quality engineering for pop or instrumental recording albums; The award was discontinued from 1997 in a major overhaul of Golden Melody Award categories. The award category re-emerged in 2015, but was divided into two new awards, the Golden Melody Awards for Best Vocal Recording Album and Best Instrumental Recording Album.

The award is presented to the audio engineer(s) on the winning work, not to the artist or performer, except if the artist is also a credited engineer.

== Recipients ==
Golden Melody Awards of 2015

- Tiger Chung, AJ Chen, Yeh Yu-hsuan, Ooi Teng Fong, Zhao Huitao, Shin Chou, Joshua Lee & Michael Lin (recording engineers); Kenny Fan, Jaycen Joshua, Dan Grech & Jerry Lin (mixing engineers); Chris Gehringer (mastering engineer) for Play, performed by Jolin Tsai

Nominees

- Martin Roller & Miikka Huttunen (recording engineers); Miikka Huttunen (mixing engineer); Svante Forsbäck (mastering engineer) for Midnight Cinema, performed by Joanna Wang
- Chang Te-ming (recording engineer); Chang Te-ming, Khalil Fong, Phil Tan, Fabian Marasciullo & Ken Lewis (mixing engineers); Dave Kutch (mastering engineer) for Dangerous World, performed by Khalil Fong
- Zhou Tianche, Thomas Lo, Zhang Hongjun & Arai Soichiro (recording engineers); Zhao Jing & Zhou Tianche (mixing engineers); Ray Staff (mastering engineer) for Departures, performed by Karen Mok
- Cheng Fung-sheng & Isaac Muñoz Casado (recording engineers); Isaac Muñoz Casado (mixing engineer); Ben Wang (mastering engineer) for Polynesia, performed by Chalaw Basiwali

Golden Melody Awards of 2016

- Li You, Dou Ruyi, Zhang Bo & Yan Zhongkun (recording engineers); Howie & Joe Hirst (mixing engineers); Ray Staff (mastering engineer) for Frozen Light, performed by Cui Jian

Nominees

- Peter Roberts, Lupo Groinig & Strawberry (recording engineers); Richard Furch & George Dum (mixing engineers); Reuben Cohen (mastering engineer) for Heartbeat, performed by G.E.M.
- AJ Chen & Jansen Chen (recording engineers); Kenny Fan (mixing engineer); Joe LaPorta (mastering engineer) for Amit 2, performed by A-mei
- Kyle Hoffmann (recording engineer); An Dong & Richard Furch (mixing engineers); John Davis (mastering engineer) for Aphasia, performed by Tanya Chua
- Howie Chou & Yeh Yu-hsuan (recording engineers); Killer Wang & Jerry Lin (mixing engineers); Chris Gehringer (mastering engineer) for Love Myself, performed by Landy Wen

Golden Melody Awards of 2017

- Sun Tien-chih (recording engineer); Sun Tien-chih (mixing engineer); Ted Jensen (mastering engineer) for Yaangad, performed by Sangpuy

Nominees

- Derrick Sepnio & Jeff Li (recording engineers); Phil Tan, Ken Lewis, Jaycen Joshua, Tony Maserati & Dave Pensado (mixing engineers); Chris Gehringer (mastering engineer) for Journey to the West, performed by Khalil Fong
- Brian Paturalski, |Ken Lewis, Tye & Enik Lin (recording engineers); Brian Paturalski, Ken Lewis, Tye & Enik Lin (mixing engineers); James Cruz (mastering engineer) for #MWHYB, performed by Vanness Wu
- Chief Wang (recording engineer); Jerry Lin (mixing engineer); Chris Gehringer (mastering engineer) for Thief, performed by Penny Tai
- Sean Chen, Yeh Yu-hsuan, Jim Lee, John Hermanson, Johnny Lin, Chen Yi-lin & Li Yuesong (recording engineers); Kenny Fan, Jerry Lin & Jim Lee (mixing engineers); Michael D. (mastering engineer) for Flow, performed by Winnie Hsin

Golden Melody Awards of 2018

- Andrew Chu, Lin Si Tong, Craig Burbidge, Plamen Penchev, A-Mon, Luantan Ascent (recording engineer); Craig Burbidge (mixing engineer); Andrew Chu (mastering engineer) for Home III, performed by Lo Ta-yu

Nominees

- Chief Wang (recording engineers); Roman Klun (mixing engineers); Roman Klun (mastering engineer) for Can You or Can You Not Understand My Mandarin, performed by Anie Fann
- Misi Ke, Andy Baker, Lin Chia-yu, Chief Wang, Liu Shih-wei (recording engineers); Andy Baker, Liu Shih-wei (mixing engineers); Joel Hatstat (mastering engineer) for Don't Make a Sound, performed by Misi Ke
- Ooi Teng Fong, Yeh Yu-hsuan, Lei Chang-hang, Micky Yang (recording engineer); Phil Tan (mixing engineer); Chris Gehringer (mastering engineer) for Story Thief, performed by A-Mei
- Marco Trentacoste (recording engineers); Marco Trentacoste (mixing engineers); Brian "Big Bass" Gardner (mastering engineer) for That's Not Me, performed by Xie Tianxiao

Golden Melody Awards of 2019

- Sandy Lam – 0

Golden Melody Awards of 2020

- Wakin Chua – The Younger Me

Golden Melody Awards of 2021

- Sun Sheng Shi – Where Is Shi?

Golden Melody Awards of 2022

- Tanya Chua – Depart

Golden Melody Awards of 2023

- Francis Tsai – Time's Up

Golden Melody Awards of 2024

- Fool And Idiot – Posture

Golden Melody Awards of 2025

- Hyukoh & Sunset Rollercoaster – AAA

Golden Melody Awards of 2026

- Jolin Tsai – Pleasure

Nominees

- Ivy Lee – Be the Change You Want to See
- Estelle Perrault – Promises
- Matzka – Djekuacan
- Miss Ko – Soul, Food
