= Be My Thrill =

Studio album by The Weepies
- Released: August 31, 2010
- Genre: Folk pop
- Length: 45:55
- Label: Nettwerk
- Producers: Deb Talan, Steve Tannen

The Weepies chronology
Hideaway (2008)	Be My Thrill (2010)	Sirens (2015)

Professional ratings
Review scores
Source	Rating
AllMusic	3.5/5 stars
Paste	7/10 stars
Reax Music	6/10 stars

Be My Thrill is the fourth studio album by The Weepies. It was released on Nettwerk on August 31, 2010. Three promotional singles, "I Was Made For Sunny Days", "Be My Thrill", and "Please Speak Well of Me", were released through the iTunes Store in the weeks leading up to the album's release.

The album debuted at number 34 on the U.S. Billboard 200 chart, selling 11,000 copies in its first week. It has sold 50,000 copies in the US as of April 2015.

== Track listing ==
All tracks are written by Deb Talan and Steve Tannen.

Original Track listing
No.	Title	Length
1.	"Please Speak Well of Me"	2:36
2.	"When You Go Away"	2:21
3.	"Red Red Rose"	2:51
4.	"I Was Made for Sunny Days" (featuring Colbie Caillat on backing vocals)	3:14
5.	"They're in Love, Where Am I?"	2:23
6.	"Add My Effort"	3:12
7.	"Be My Thrill"	2:30
8.	"Be My Honeypie"	2:10
9.	"Hummingbird"	2:45
10.	"Hard to Please"	4:12
11.	"Not a Lullaby"	2:37
12.	"How Do You Get High?"	2:36
13.	"Hope Tomorrow"	1:59
14.	"Empty Your Hands"	3:09

iTunes Deluxe Edition
No.	Title	Length
15.	"Red Red Rose (Demo)"	3:14
16.	"Hard to Please (Demo)"	4:14

== Personnel ==
=== Musicians ===
- Deb Talan - vocals, guitar, wurlitzer, keyboard
- Steve Tannen - vocals, guitar, wurlitzer, keyboard
- Frank Lenz - drums, percussion, vibraphone, synth
- Tony Levin - bass (tracks 1, 3, 6, 7, 12, 14)
- Larry Klein - bass (tracks 2, 5, 9, 11, 13)
- Whynot Jansveld - bass (tracks 8, 10)
- Eli Thomson - bass (track 4)
- Meg Toohey - electric guitar
- Brad Gordon - organ, piano, wurlitzer, mellotron
- Oliver Kraus - violin, viola, cello (tracks 1, 5, 14)
- Colbie Caillat - background vocals (track 4)

=== Technical ===
- Deb Talan - engineering and production
- Steven Tannen - engineering and production
- Ryan Freeland - mixing
- Evren Goknar - mastering (tracks 1, 2, 5, 7, 8, 9, 10, 11, 12, 13)
- George Marino - mastering (tracks 3, 4, 6, 14)

== Charts ==
Chart (2010)	Peak position
U.S. Billboard 200	34
Rock Albums	11
Digital Albums	8
Independent Albums	5
Folk Albums	3
