= Sirens (The Weepies album) =

Studio album by the Weepies
- Released: April 28, 2015
- Recorded: 2014
- Genre: Folk-pop
- Length: 48:05
- Label: Nettwerk
- Producer: Deb Talan; Steve Tannen

The Weepies chronology
Be My Thrill (2010)	Sirens (2015)

Professional ratings
Review scores
Source	Rating
AllMusic	4/5 stars
Paste	8.2/10
PopMatters	7/10

Sirens is the fifth and final studio album by folk-pop duo the Weepies. It was released in 2015, their first album in five years, by Nettwerk. It was recorded in 2014 during Deb Talan's battle with breast cancer.

== Track listing ==
All songs written by Deb Talan and Steve Tannen, except where noted.

No.	Title	Length
1.	"River from the Sky"	2:29
2.	"No Trouble"	3:29
3.	"Sirens"	3:48
4.	"Learning to Fly" (Tom Petty, Jeff Lynne)	3:09
5.	"Never Let You Down"	2:26
6.	"Wild Boy"	3:13
7.	"Ever Said Goodbye"	2:00
8.	"Fancy Things"	2:15
9.	"Early Morning Riser"	2:49
10.	"Boys Who Want to be Girls"	3:26
11.	"Crooked Smile"	2:24
12.	"Brand New Pair of Wings"	3:07
13.	"Sunflower"	3:32
14.	"Does Not Bear Repeating"	4:09
15.	"My Little Love"	1:56
16.	"Volunteer" (Mark Geary)	3:53

== Personnel ==
- Deb Talan – vocals, piano, synthesizer, mellotron, keyboards, guitar, ukulele, tines, percussion, programming
- Steve Tannen – vocals, guitar, piano, keyboards, percussion, programming
- Jon Flaugher – bass
- Frank Lenz – drums, percussion, tines, background vocals
- Gerry Leonard – guitar
- Pete Thomas – drums, percussion
- Rami Jaffee – organ, omnichord, keyboards
- Oliver Kraus – strings
- Matt Chamberlain – drums, percussion
- Eli Thomson – bass
- Steve Nieve – piano
- Tony Levin – bass
- Sebastian Steinberg – bass
- Whynot Jansveld – bass, keyboards
- Meg Toohey – guitar
- Brad Gordon – piano
- Phil Chen – banjo
- Vartan Babayan – percussion
- Andrew Baham – trumpet
- Stephen Lands – trumpet
- Rex Gregory – alto saxophone
- Roderick Paulin – tenor saxophone
- Michael Watson – trombone
