= Goodbye & Hello (Tanya Chua album) =

Album by Tanya Chua

Goodbye and Hello

Studio album by Tanya Chua
- Released: 19 October 2007
- Genre: Mandopop
- Length: 44:46
- Language: Mandarin
- Label: Asia Muse Entertainment
- Producer: Tanya Chua

Tanya Chua chronology
| T-time (2006) | Goodbye and Hello (2007) | My Space (2008) |

Goodbye & Hello is the sixth Mandarin-language studio album by Singaporean singer-songwriter Tanya Chua, released on 19 October 2007, by Asia Muse Entertainment. After receiving her first Best Female Mandarin Singer award at the 17th Golden Melody Awards in 2006, Chua felt lost in regards to her music career. The album was released after ending her 8-month online relationship, mentioning that "inspiration comes after a few setbacks and wounds".

At the 19th Golden Melody Awards, the album earned her the Best Female Mandarin Singer for the second time along with the Best Producer award out of seven nominations, the most ever received by a female artist.

== Creative background ==
Prior to the release of Goodbye & Hello, Chua went through a long period of career uncertainty, with her original label insisting that she continue on the path of melancholia. However, eager for a new breakthrough, she made the decision to travel to Taiwan within a week to seek a chance to say goodbye to her past. In Chua's point of view, she was not proficient in Chinese writing before, and she would still have a certain degree of language barrier when interpreting other people's lyrics, and she felt that she was not close enough to the songs. So with her new record label, Chua decided to write her own lyrics for the first time, to open up about her love world for the first time, and to find an outlet for her story. Finding a home with a new record company, Chua took on the role of producer for her new album. In the process of writing the record, Chua was able to write four to five songs a day, with the fastest one being finished in five minutes.

A past relationship had taken Chua through another phase of her life and led to the creation of the album Goodbye & Hello. Almost all of the songs on this album were written after Chua's 8-month relationship ended, and all of her creative work was inspired by the sad and painful experiences that inspired her to write. She wrote songs to express the pain and regrets that the relationship inflicted on her after saying goodbye to it.

== Writing and production ==
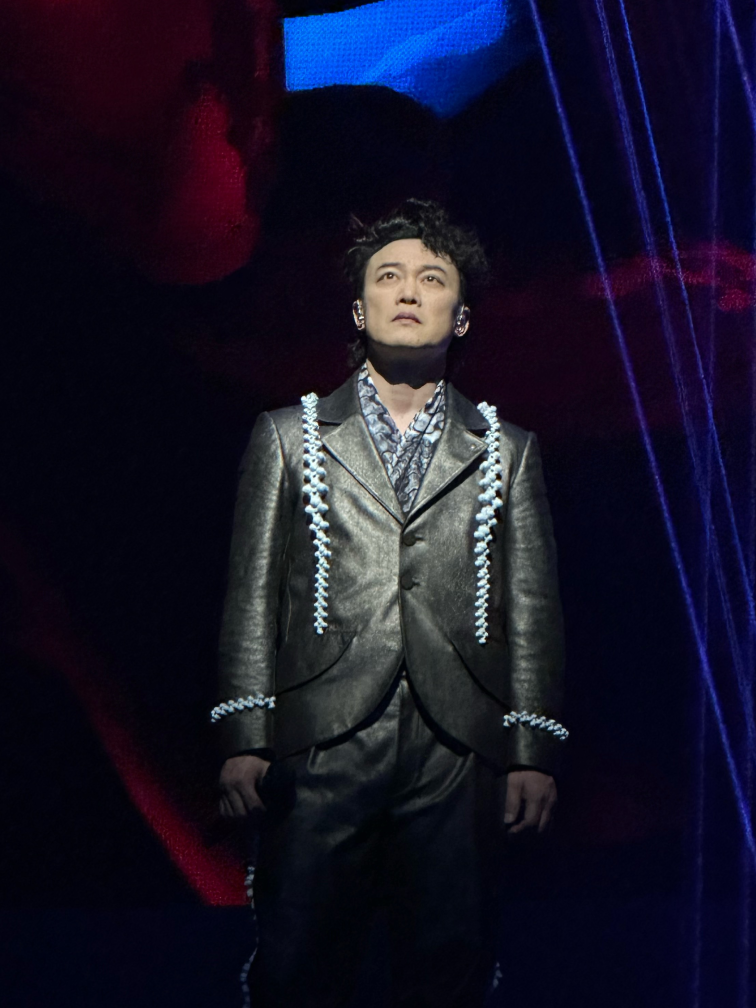
The hit song "Black Space" was originally written for Eason Chan, but he rejected it

Goodbye & Hello album has a variety of music styles, rich in subject matter, to demonstrate Chua's creativity, and to make a lot of changes in her singing voice, the use of real and fake voice conversion, and to show her singing skills. The concept of the album is unanimously and completely manipulated by Chua herself, to maintain the usual flavor of Chua's music, but also to add a fresh listening experience.

The 11 compositions in the album represent 11 attitudes of Chua to recognize life and witness love. The lyrics of "When You Leave Me" describe Chua's pain when her love leaves. "Blank Space" is a song that Chua completed in five minutes. During the creation of the song Chua was in tears while writing because of the intensity of her feelings, but she still paid attention to whether the lyrics were rhyming or not, and in the process of recording, she even choked up a few times. According to her, when she writes about these emotions, it's like saying it all out loud, like finding an outlet to express her emotions, so that she doesn't get caught up in them. The song "Chemistry Experiments" expresses the idea of compromise and change in a relationship from the perspective of a chemistry experiment, aptly using the phrases "Thermal expansion" and "resource classification" to add playfulness and lightness to the number.

"Darwin" uses the concept of survival of the fittest from an evolutionary point of view to analyze the concept of love. Through the guitar strumming and Chua's vocal interpretation, the song expresses the journey of the male and female animals who are wandering through the revolving door of love. Regarding the creative process of "Darwin", Chua described it as "very inexplicable". One morning, Chua suddenly wanted to write a song for Eason Chan. As she was writing, she kept thinking about his voice, and when Xiao Han finished filling in the lyrics and brought it back to Chua to sing the demo, she almost imagined herself as Eason Chan. So, as a songwriter, Chua was full of hope and recommended the song to Eason Chan, but Eason didn't like it. For two years, the two sides discussed this song, and Chua insisted that the song would not be sold to anyone other than Eason Chan. In the end, because the other party still did not have a clear response, Chua decided to use it for her own interpretation. Only then did the number "Darwin" see the light of day.

"Goodbye & Hello" is a rock song that opens with electric guitars, displaying explosive power and vitality. Having been immersed in Western music for a long time, Chua's singing of these kind of songs always exudes the uniqueness of Western female singers, which is distinctly different from the general female vocal approach in the market. The title song not only represents a farewell to love, but also a welcome to a new life. "It's True" is a light-hearted melody by Chua paired with the words of David Ke. "It's True" is a realistic and apt portrayal of the state of mind of this generation when we are in our 30's and beyond, which is why we are always attracted by the characters of Japanese and Korean dramas to find our own projections, just as the lyrics say, "The world is a big place and time is limited, so we should all stroll around a bit more". The simple, unfussy melody of the number "If You Love Me" is laid out in a murmuring, whispering voice that sings verbalized lyrics, intoning modern-day sentiments about love.

== Song controversy ==
"Can't Understand Anymore" was accused of plagiarizing the song "Gotta Have You" by the American indie pop-folk band The Weepies.

== Singles and music videos ==
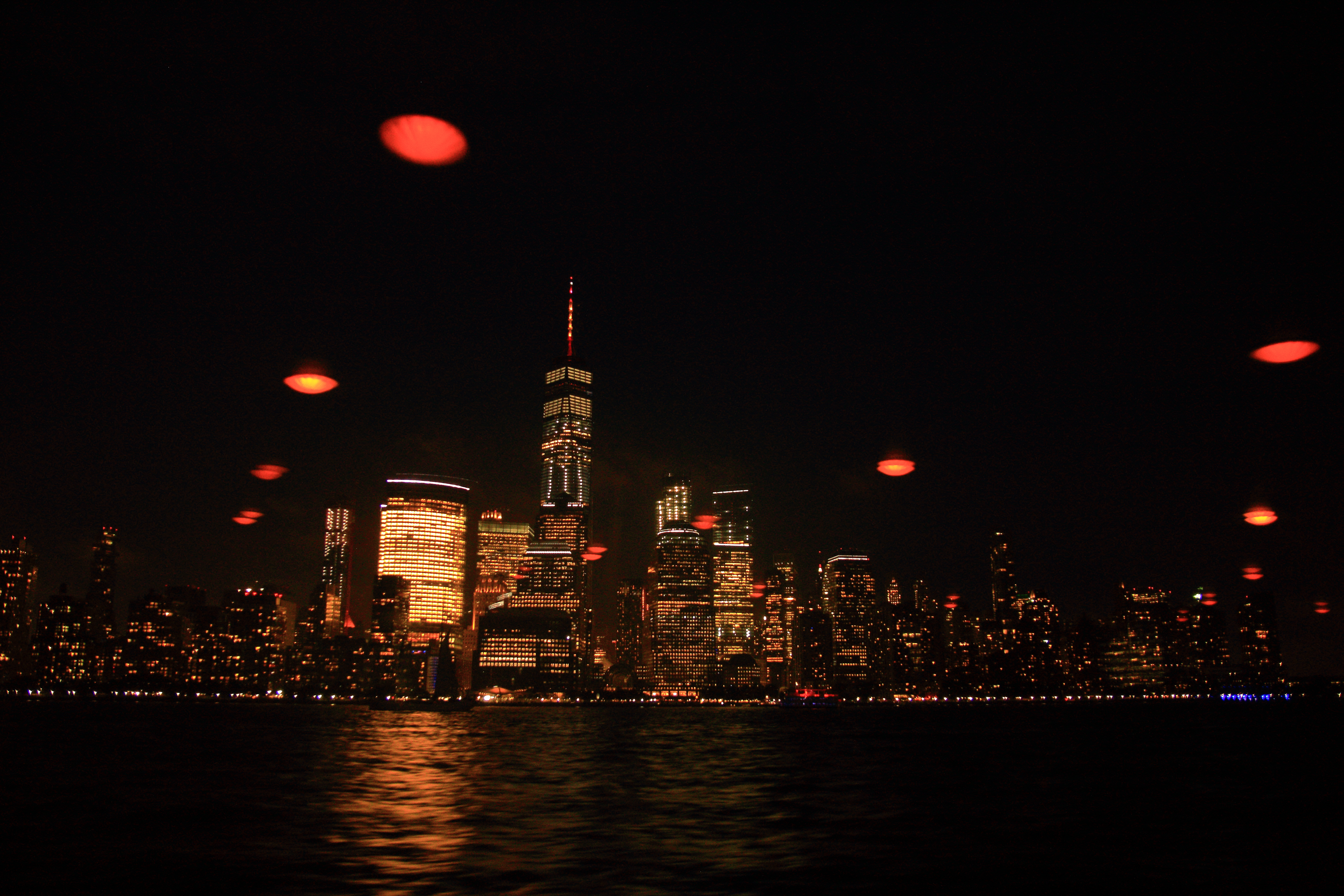
The music video for "If You Love Me" was largely filmed in New York City

For the music video of "Darwin", the production team and Chua traveled to New York specifically for the filming. On the release of the music video, due to the different charting time between Mainland China, Hong Kong and Taiwan, the record company planned to launch the music video of "Darwin" in Taiwan before they did in the mainland. However, due to the rapid introduction of Taiwanese music and mainland music, the "Darwin" music video actually appeared on song request lists and Karaoke boxes before the promotion in the mainland began. Which is a rare and special situation. The video for the song "When You Leave Me" revolves around the heroine's emotional experience and her nostalgia for the hero after he leaves.

During the filming of the "Blank Space" music video, director Shockley Huang, in order to create a sad atmosphere of separation, specially created artificial rain in a big scene. Chua lip-synced and performed in the rain for two hours. Coupled with the autumn breeze, she had a headache and a cold after filming. The cold intensified, so she had to scrape nervously. In response to the needs of the video's plot, Chua still had to hit the wall, and it was a real head-to-head collision. The right side of her body fell to the wall and fell down more than ten times. Her right arm was bruised and she was unable to lift it, so she had to ask for help from a masseuse. Chua truly expressed the pain of the failure of online dating in the song "Blank Space", with all the tears in the music video being real. The music video for "If You Love Me" features Chua singing and strolling about around various locations in New York City and Coney Island. Singer R-chord, who was a newbie at the time, participated in the music video for the song "Morning News."

"When You Leave Me" was listed at number 34 on the Hit FM Top 100 Singles of the Year chart for 2007.

== Accolades ==
At the 19th Golden Melody Awards ceremony held on 5 July 2008, Chua received the most nominations out of any of the female artists that night, earning seven of them. She ended up taking home two awards, which were for Best Album Producer and Best Mandarin Female Singer.

== Track listing ==
| No. | Title | Length |
|---|---|---|
| 1. | "Darwin" (達爾文) | 4:25 |
| 2. | "Goodbye & Hello" | 3:38 |
| 3. | "When You Leave Me" (當你離開的時候) | 3:56 |
| 4. | "Blank Space" (空白格) | 4:12 |
| 5. | "Can't Understand Anymore" (越來越不懂) | 4:09 |
| 6. | "If You Love Me" (如果你愛我) | 3:51 |
| 7. | "Chemistry Experiments" (化學實驗) | 4:14 |
| 8. | "It's True" | 4:24 |
| 9. | "Morning News" (晨間新聞) | 3:48 |
| 10. | "The Way Passed By" (走過的路) | 4:30 |
| 11. | "達爾文II進化版" (Darwin II (Evolution Version)) | 3:39 |
| Total length: | | 44:46 |

== Awards and nominations ==
19th Golden Melody Awards, Taiwan – 2007
| Award | Nomination | Result |
|---|---|---|
| Song of the Year | "Darwin" | Nominated |
| Best Mandarin Album | Goodbye & Hello | Nominated |
| Best Composer | "Blank Space" – Tanya Chua | Nominated |
| Best Lyricist | "Darwin" – Xiaohan | Nominated |
| Best Arrangement | "Darwin" – Ray Huang | Nominated |
| Best Album Producer – Vocal Category | Goodbye & Hello – Tanya Chua | Won |
| Best Female Mandarin Singer | Goodbye & Hello – Tanya Chua | Won |
