= Happiness (The Weepies album) =

Studio album by The Weepies
- Released: November 29, 2003
- Genre: Pop-folk
- Length: 26:03
- Label: Independent
- Producers: Deb Talan, Steve Tannen

The Weepies chronology
Happiness (2003)	Say I Am You (2006)

Professional ratings
Review scores
Source	Rating
AllMusic	3.5/5 stars

Happiness is the debut studio album released by pop-folk band the Weepies. It was released independently by the band on November 29, 2003.

== Promotion ==
The song "All That I Want" is featured in a series of 2007 J.C. Penney Christmas commercials. It was also featured in a season 1 episode of the hit TV series Gossip Girl. It was also used in a Webkinz Christmas commercial.

The song "Somebody Loved" is featured in the 2004 Todd Solondz film, Palindromes. It is also featured in episode 3 of the second season of Dirty Sexy Money in a scene where the Weepies appear as themselves, performing the song.

The song "Happiness" is featured in the episode "Informed Consent" from the third season of TV series House M.D..

== Track listing ==
All tracks are written by Deb Talan and Steve Tannen.

No.	Title	Length
1.	"Happiness"	3:28
2.	"All That I Want"	3:22
3.	"Vegas Baby"	2:44
4.	"Somebody Loved"	2:41
5.	"Jolene"	2:34
6.	"Simple Life"	3:53
7.	"Dating a Porn Star"	4:04
8.	"Keep It There"	3:17
