= Say I Am You =

Studio album by The Weepies
- Released: March 7, 2006
- Genres: Indie folk, indie pop
- Length: 41:15
- Label: Nettwerk
- Producers: Deb Talan, Steve Tannen

The Weepies chronology
Happiness (2003)	Say I Am You (2006)	Live Session EP (iTunes Exclusive) (2006)

Professional ratings
Review scores
Source	Rating
About.com	5/5 stars
Allmusic	3.5/5 stars
Harp	favorable
No Depression	not rated
Paste	3.5/5 stars
PopMatters	7/10
Sing Out!	favorable

Say I Am You is the second album released by indie folk band The Weepies and their first full-length record. It was released on Nettwerk Records on March 7, 2006. Sing Out! described the album as "tuneful, quiet pop that borrows a thing or two from folk." The thirteen tracks were co-written by Deb Talan and Steve Tannen, who alternate between lead and harmony vocals in various tracks.

Several songs from the album were featured in television shows and films:

- "Gotta Have You" appeared in an episode of the sitcom How I Met Your Mother and a Chinese audio-drama Foxy Guy
- "World Spins Madly On" appeared in the film Because I Said So, an episode of One Tree Hill, an episode of Life Unexpected, the episode "My Déjà Vu, My Déjà Vu" of Scrubs, an episode of Up All Night, an episode of Greek, and an episode of Sense8.
- "Painting by Chagall" appeared in the 2007 film The Heartbreak Kid
- "Stars" appeared in a 2007 Old Navy winter advertisement
- "Living in Twilight" appeared in the episode "Legacy" of "Greek", and the episode "Touched by an 'A'-ngel" of "Pretty Little Liars"

== Track listing ==
All tracks are written by Deb Talan and Steve Tannen.

No.	Title	Length
1.	"Take It from Me"	3:52
2.	"Gotta Have You"	3:19
3.	"World Spins Madly On"	2:45
4.	"Citywide Rodeo"	4:13
5.	"Riga Girls"	2:35
6.	"Suicide Blonde"	1:39
7.	"Painting by Chagall"	3:57
8.	"Nobody Knows Me at All"	2:00
9.	"Not Your Year"	3:34
10.	"Living in Twilight"	2:59
11.	"Stars"	3:02
12.	"Love Doesn't Last Too Long"	2:46
13.	"Slow Pony Home"	4:11

== Personnel ==
- Deb Talan – vocals, guitar, keyboard, percussion
- Steve Tannen – vocals, guitar, keyboard, percussion
- Frank Lenz – drums
- Erik Klass – drums
- Whynot Jansveld – bass, electric guitar, baritone guitar
- Meghan Toohey – keyboard, electric guitars
- Joe Ross – mixing
- Matt Searle – mixing
