= A Bird Flies Out =

Studio album by Deb Talan
- Released: 29 June 2003
- Genre: Folk, Country
- Length: 44:57
- Label: Deb Talan

Deb Talan chronology
Sincerely (2001)	A Bird Flies Out (2003)	Lucky Girl (2017)

A Bird Flies Out is the fourth album by American singer-songwriter Deb Talan, released on June 29, 2003, on her independent label.

By YouTube's metrics, "Rocks and Water" is by far the most popular song of the album and has been covered a lot by other musicians.

"Tell Your Story Walking" has been featured in the teen drama television series One Tree Hill, a series famous for its music.

== Track listing ==
All tracks are written by Deb Talan.

No.	Title	Length
1.	"Unraveling"	3:48
2.	"Tell Your Story Walking"	3:30
3.	"How Will He Find Me"	3:09
4.	"Saturn's Light"	4:21
5.	"Comfort"	3:16
6.	"Big Strong Girl"	4:02
7.	"Sincerely"	4:03
8.	"Two Points"	3:35
9.	"Rocks and Water"	3:43
10.	"To the Bone"	3:44
11.	"Ashes on Your Eyes"	4:22
12.	"A Bird Flies Out"	3:25
