= Cho Dependent =

Studio album by Margaret Cho
- Released: August 24, 2010
- Recorded: 2009–2010
- Studio: Clownery Productions
- Genre: Pop; comedy; Rock
- Length: 50:54
- Label: Clownery Records
- Producer: Ben Lee, Grant-Lee Phillips, Howard Redekopp, Tegan and Sara, Brendan Benson, Andrew Bird, Jon Brion, Garrison Starr, Meghan Toohey, Ani DiFranco, Kurt Hall

Margaret Cho chronology
Cho Dependent (2010)	American Myth (2016)

Cho Dependent is the first studio album (sixth album, including her stand-up comedy releases) from American actress and comedian Margaret Cho. Released on August 24, 2010, as her debut album for Clownery Records, it earned a nomination for a 2011 Grammy award for Best Comedy Album. Cho supported the album by releasing music videos for six songs: "Intervention", "I'm Sorry", "Eat Shit and Die", "Lice", "Asian Adjacent", and "Hey Big Dog"

== Track listing ==
No.	Title	Writer(s)	Guest Musician	Length
1.	"Intervention"	Margaret Cho, Tegan and Sara	Tegan and Sara	4:42
2.	"Calling In Stoned"	Cho, Ben Lee	Tommy Chong	2:53
3.	"Your Dick"	Cho, A.C. Newman	Ben Lee	4:08
4.	"Baby I'm with the Band"	Brendan Benson, Cho	Brendan Benson	3:35
5.	"Hey Big Dog"	Cho, Patty Griffin	Fiona Apple	4:14
6.	"I'm Sorry"	Andrew Bird, Cho	Andrew Bird	3:18
7.	"Lice"	Cho, Lee		2:38
8.	"Enemies"	Jon Brion, Cho	Jon Brion	2:59
9.	"Asian Adjacent"	Cho, Grant-Lee Phillips		4:03
10.	"Gimme Your Seed"	Cho, Garrison Starr, Meghan Toohey	Garrison Starr	3:44
11.	"Eat Shit and Die"	Cho, Phillips	Grant-Lee Phillips	3:27
12.	"Captain Cameltoe"	Cho, Ani DiFranco	Ani DiFranco	2:58
13.	"My Puss"	Cho, Kurt Hall, Armen Melik, Yeshe Perl, Simon Rex, Diana Yanez		3:26
14.	"Lesbian Escalation" (hidden track not on CD/full track bonus track on streaming purchases)			5:10
15.	"Mazel Tov" (bonus track)			4:36
16.	"No Offense" (bonus track)			3:53

== Singles and videos ==
- "I'm Sorry" (2010)
- "Eat Shit and Die" (2010)
- "Lice" (2010)
- "Intervention" (2010)
- "Captain Cameltoe" (2011)
- "Hey Big Dog" (2011)
- "Asian Adjacent" (2011)
- "Baby I'm with the Band" (2011)

== Reception ==
Professional ratings
Review scores
Source	Rating
Allmusic	3.5/5 stars

The album debuted at #3 on the Billboard Top Comedy Albums chart for the week of September 11, 2010.
