= Foxcatcher (soundtrack) =

2014 soundtrack album

Foxcatcher (Soundtrack from the Motion Picture)

Soundtrack album by Rob Simonsen, West Dylan Thordson, Mychael Danna and various artists
- Released: November 11, 2014
- Recorded: 2014
- Studios: AIR, London
- Genres: Film score; film soundtrack
- Length: 49:04
- Label: Madison Gate
- Producers: Rob Simonsen; West Dylan Thordson; Mychael Danna

Rob Simonsen chronology
Wish I Was Here (2014)	Foxcatcher (Soundtrack from the Motion Picture) (2014)	The Age of Adaline (2015)

West Dylan Thordson chronology
Foxcatcher (2014)	Dixieland (2015)

Mychael Danna chronology
Tyrant (2014)	Foxcatcher (2014)	The Captive (2014)

Foxcatcher (Soundtrack from the Motion Picture) is the soundtrack album to the 2014 film Foxcatcher directed by Bennett Miller starring Steve Carell, Channing Tatum, and Mark Ruffalo. The soundtrack featured music composed by Rob Simonsen, West Dylan Thordson and Mychael Danna, and also featured songs from Bob Dylan, Arvo Pärt amongst several others. Madison Gate Records released the soundtrack on November 11, 2014.

== Development ==
Foxcatcher features a musical score composed by Rob Simonsen, who recorded most of the music at AIR Studios in London. He said the film has a sensibility of sparseness as "the notes or colors that do show up have a greater impact". After he listened to Jacob Cohen's cello performance at a subway stop platform, Simonsen eventually brought him to record the cello solos.

Music supervisor Susan Jacobs selected samples from various composers to be used as placeholders for the temp music. Among these were recordings by film composer West Dylan Thordson, which Miller liked. After Thordson met Miller in New York City the following year, Thordson decided to move to New York to compose the test score. Eventually, however, he became involved as a co-composers. Mychael Danna, whom Miller had worked with in Capote (2005) and Moneyball (2011), was assigned to complete the finished score. However, Simonsen would receive the credit for the principal composer.

According to Thordson, there was a "similar intimacy to the melodic voices all three of us [composers] gravitate towards". While Danna and Simonsen evoked a sophisticated quality, Thordson incorporated a rough and handmade sound, reminiscent of "the world of a slightly out-of-tune farmhouse piano".

== Reception ==
Justin Chang of Variety wrote "Rob Simonsen’s score is spare and beautifully ominous, while the exceptional sound work often alternates feverish background noise with silence to highly unsettling effect." Matt Patches of IGN wrote "Rob Simonsen's delicate score strings an elegy across a Hell of dampened interiors and blue-hued vistas." Matt Goldberg of Collider wrote "Rob Simonsen's lovely score is distant and melancholy." Ty Burr of The Boston Globe wrote "the score by Rob Simonsen throbs with discreet strings." Ryan Lambie of Den of Geek described it as a "minimal score" and Brad Brevet of Comingsoon.net called it as "elegiac". William Fanelli of Flickering Myth called it as a "limited but wonderful score".

== Track listing ==
Foxcatcher (Soundtrack from the Motion Picture) track listing
No.	Title	Artist(s)	Length
1.	"Home Movies"	Rob Simonsen	1:58
2.	"Corruption"	Simonsen	1:01
3.	"Palaces"	West Dylan Thordson	1:45
4.	"This Land Is Your Land"	Bob Dylan	6:00
5.	"Duponts"	Thordson	2:01
6.	"Valley Forge"	Mychael Danna	0:55
7.	"To Forget"	Thordson	4:22
8.	"Strange New World"	Simonsen	1:32
9.	"Villa Del Refugio" (edit)	This Will Destroy You	4:21
10.	"The Continuation of Things"	Simonsen	1:26
11.	"Olympic Losses"	Simonsen	6:18
12.	"Honor"	Simonsen	0:57
13.	"Child (To Forget)"	Thordson	1:57
14.	"Times Changing"	Thordson	2:26
15.	"Sealion"	Joshua L. Pearson	1:25
16.	"Für Alina"	Arvo Pärt; Alexander Malter	10:40
Total length:			49:04
