= Extraordinary (Mandy Moore song) =

Single by Mandy Moore

from the album Wild Hope
- Released: April 10, 2007
- Length: 2:54
- Label: The Firm Music.; EMI
- Songwriters: Mandy Moore; Deb Talan; Steve Tannen
- Producer: John Alagia

Mandy Moore singles chronology
"Senses Working Overtime" (2004)	"Extraordinary" (2007)	"Nothing That You Are" (2007)

Audio video
- "Extraordinary" on YouTube

"Extraordinary" is a song recorded by American singer-songwriter Mandy Moore. It was released as the first single from her fourth studio album, Wild Hope (2007). The song was written by Moore, Deb Talan, and Steve Tannen and produced by John Algia. "Extraordinary" is an indie rhythmic folk pop, with an arrangement of acoustic guitar, drums, keyboards, and electric guitar.

== Release ==
Moore performed the song live for the first time at the official first televised ceremony of the Brick Awards on The CW, though she has also performed the song at a number of smaller gigs. Billboard magazine said that "Moore's once-girlish vocals now project a richer, more purposeful texture, well-suited to the autobiographical theme...".

== Chart performance ==
The song peaked at number 2 on the US Bubbling Under Hot 100 and number 25 on the Adult Top 40 chart.

== Music video ==
The music video of "Extraordinary" was directed by Ace Norton. The music video featured green screen footage of Moore as different characters, including a hippie chick, a rocker chick, a '50s housewife and Amelia Earhart. The characters are hanging on and standing upon each other with some holding on to different objects. "She's kind of the hero," Moore explained. "She's the Mandy that makes the move to jump off the tower and be extraordinary." The music video was shot in Los Angeles, despite being filmed inside the studio with the city setting. It entered the VH1's Top 20 Video Countdown chart at number twelve.

== In other media ==
The song was included on the trailer and ending credits of the 2007 comedy-drama film Georgia Rule.

== Charts ==
Chart performance for "Extraordinary"
Chart (2007)	Peak position
US Bubbling Under Hot 100 (Billboard)	2
US Adult Pop Airplay (Billboard)	25
