= 27th Golden Melody Awards =

Taiwanese music awards ceremony in 2016

27th Golden Melody Awards(GMA27)
- Date: 25 June 2016 (Popular music); 13 August 2016 (Traditional music)
- Location: Taipei Arena, Taiwan (Popular music); National Center for Traditional Arts, Taiwan (Traditional music)
- Hosted by: Mickey Huang (Popular music)

Television/radio coverage
- Network: TTV

The 27th Golden Melody Awards (Chinese: 第27屆金曲獎) was held in Taipei, Taiwan in 2016. The award ceremony for the popular music categories was hosted by Mickey Huang and broadcast on TTV on 25 June. The award ceremony for the traditional music categories was held at the National Center for Traditional Arts on 13 August.

== Winners and nominees ==
Below is the list of key nominees and winners for the popular music categories. Winners are highlighted in bold.

=== Vocal category – Music publishing awards ===
==== Song of the Year ====
- **"Aka Pisawad" – Suming**
  - "Matriarchy" – AMIT
  - "Twilight" – JJ Lin
  - "Rainy Night" – Sodagreen
  - "A Little Happiness" – Hebe Tien

==== Best Mandarin Album ====
- **Winter Endless** – **Sodagreen**
  - Swing Inc. – Peggy Hsu
  - Progress Reports – Eli Hsieh
  - AMIT2 – AMIT
  - Aphasia – Tanya Chua
  - Infinity – PoeTek

==== Best Music Video ====
- **"When Sorrow Being Downloaded Twice"(Sandee Chan) – Tan Tsung-fan**
  - "Eternal Summer" (Mayday) – Su Chien-i
  - "I'm Not Yours" (Jolin Tsai) – Muh Chen
  - "I Am Alive" (JJ Lin feat. Jason Mraz) – Liu Keng-ming
  - "King of Doubt" (Hush) – Chen Hung-i

=== Vocal category – Individual awards ===
==== Best Mandarin Male Singer ====
- **JJ Lin – From M.E. to Myself**
  - Namewee – Asian Killer 2015
  - Li Jian – Li Jian
  - Kowen Ko – If You Still Wander
  - Matzka – Southeast Beauty

==== Best Mandarin Female Singer ====
- **Julia Peng – Darling**
  - Peggy Hsu – Swing Inc.
  - Huang Qishan – Xiao Xia
  - Su Yunying – Ming Ming
  - AMIT – AMIT2
  - Tanya Chua – Aphasia

==== Best Band ====
- **Sodagreen – Winter Endless**

==== Best Group ====
- **Chang and Lee – Chang and Lee**

==== Best New Artist ====
- **Eli Hsieh – Progress Reports**

=== Special awards ===
==== Lifetime Contribution Award ====
- **Tracy Huang**
