= Where I Belong (Tanya Chua song) =

- Cover art of Where I Belong

EP by Tanya Chua
- Released: 23 July 2001
- Recorded: 2001
- Genre: Rock
- Length: 3:04
- Labels: Yellow Music, Universal Music
- Producer: Iskandar Ismail

Official National Day Parade theme song chronology
Shine on Me (2000)	Where I Belong (2001)	We Will Get There (2002)

Song sample
- 30 seconds of "Where I Belong": file; help

Where I Belong is an EP released in 2001 by Singaporean singer and songwriter, Tanya Chua. It was officially commissioned as the theme song to the 2001 National Day celebrations in Singapore.

The song is easily recognized by many for its rock tune and smooth melody. In Singapore, the song became an immediate hit after its release, reaching number one status by mid-July 2001. It is the first and only EP to be released in NDP history.

Twelve years later at NDP 2013, this song was sung by the combined schools choir, acknowledging the arrival of former prime ministers, Mr Lee Kuan Yew and ESM Goh Chok Tong. A rendition performed by the Singapore Symphony Orchestra and Singapore Symphony Youth Choir was released in August 2021 to celebrate the twentieth anniversary of the song's release.

== Background ==
Originally part of the Sing Singapore project, the song was written and composed by Tanya. It was later recorded in Atomic Studios in early 2001 and mixed in the same studio by Mo Lee.

In July 2001, the song was officially released at a press conference. A few days after its release, it reached Platinum status and later a number one hit in Singapore. On the actual parade day in 2001, it was performed by Tanya herself.

== Track listing ==
All tracks are written by Tanya Chua.

Side one
No.	Title	Length
1.	"Where I Belong"	3:04
2.	"Where I Belong (Minus One)"	3:04

Side two
No.	Title	Chinese Lyrics	Length
1.	"属于"	Ng King Kang (吴庆康)	3:25
2.	"属于 (Minus One)"		3:25

== Music video ==
The video was officially sponsored by government bodies which include the National Arts Council, Ministry of Information, Communications and the Arts and the Sing Singapore project. It was directed by Roslan Ismail, who is affiliated with Gravity Films.

== See also ==
- Tanya Chua
- National Day Parade
- Music of Singapore
