= Tanya Chua =

Singaporean singer and songwriter

- 蔡健雅
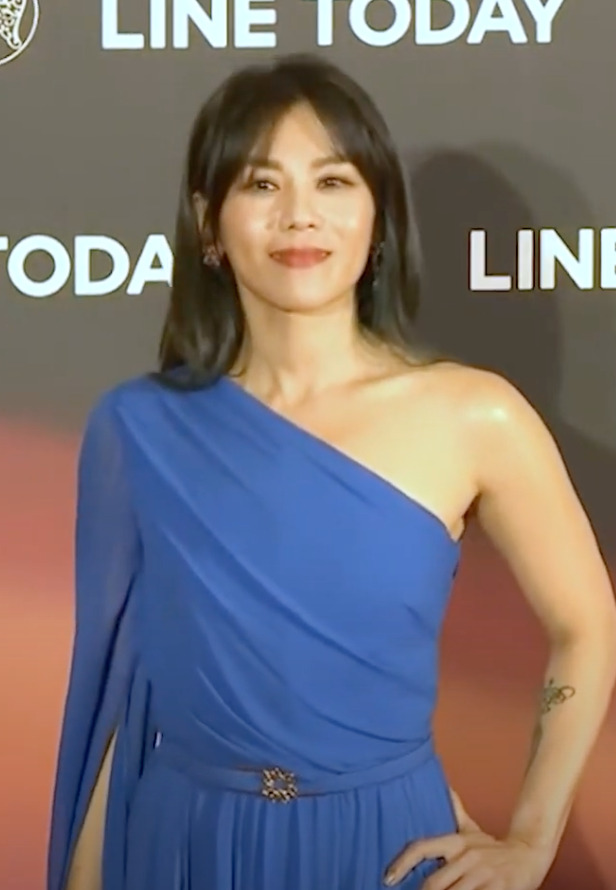
- Chua in 2022
- Born: Chua Chian Ya; 28 January 1975 (age 51); Singapore
- Occupations: Singer; songwriter; record producer
- Years active: 1997–present
- Agent: LEAP Entertainment
- Musical career
- Genre: Pop
- Instruments: Vocals; piano; guitar; drums; harmonica
- Labels: Universal Music; Warner Music; Asia Muse

Chinese name
- Chinese: 蔡健雅
Transcriptions
Standard Mandarin
- Hanyu Pinyin: Cài Jiànyǎ

Tanya Chua Chian Ya (Note: Chinese: 蔡健雅; pinyin: Cài Jiànyǎ) (born 28 January 1975) is a Singaporean singer-songwriter. She launched her singing career by releasing her debut studio album Bored in 1997. She was part of the trio that sang "Moments of Magic" (1999), Singapore's official millennium song. Her albums, Amphibian (2005), Goodbye & Hello (2007), Sing It Out of Love (2011) and Depart (2021), each won her a Golden Melody Award for Best Mandarin Female Singer award.

With a career spanning more than two decades, Chua is the only person to win the Best Mandarin Female Singer award four times at the Golden Melody Awards, and has achieved popularity in Greater China and among the Chinese-speaking world.

== Life and career ==
=== 1975–1996: Early years and career beginnings ===
Chua was born in Singapore on 28 January 1975. She attended CHIJ Saint Nicholas Girls' School, and achieved a diploma in business administration at Singapore Polytechnic.

=== 1997–2002: Universal Music ===
In 1997, Chua signed a recording deal with Singaporean management company Music & Movement, and debuted her singing career by releasing an English album titled Bored. In 1998, she attended the electric guitar classes at Musicians Institute in Los Angeles. In 1999, Chua signed a recording deal with PolyGram, and released her first self-titled Mandarin album. In the same year, she released her second English album Luck. The song "The Wicked Signs of Trying to Be a Superstar" was written by Taiwanese singer-songwriter David Tao.

In March 2000, Chua released her second Mandarin album Remember under Universal Music Group which acquired PolyGram on the same year. The album earned her a nomination for Best New Artist at the 11th Golden Melody Awards. In the same year, she wrote the theme song of the Singaporean film Chicken Rice War, and appeared on the film herself. In 2001, Chua released her third Mandarin album I Do Believe which earned her a nomination for Best Mandarin Female Singer at the 13th Golden Melody Awards. In the same year, she performed in the Singapore National Day Parade with her self-written theme song titled "Where I Belong". In 2002, Japanese record label S2S released an English album titled Secret Lavender which contained seven songs from Chua. Her composition "Wrong Number" for Chinese singer Faye Wong earned her a Golden Melody Award nomination for Best Composition.

Universal initially did not renew Chua's contract after it expired in 2002 but eventually offered to renew her contract. Both would eventually agree not to renew her contract.

=== 2003–2006: Warner Music ===
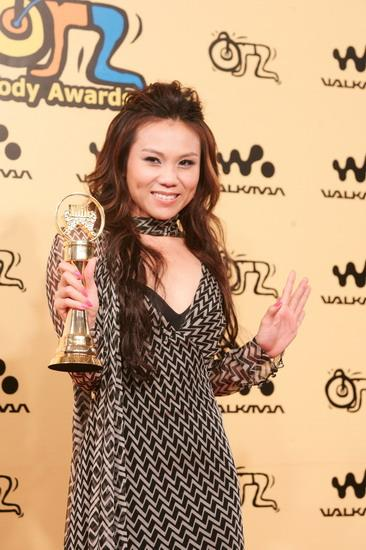
Chua in 2006

In 2003, Chua signed a recording deal with Warner Music Taiwan, and released her fourth Mandarin album Stranger which earned her a nomination for Best Mandarin Female Singer at the 15th Golden Melody Awards. In the same year, she released her fourth English album Jupiter. In 2004, Chua produced Hong Kong singer Gigi Leung's album Belongingness. In 2005, Chua released her fifth Mandarin album Amphibian. At the 17th Golden Melody Awards, she won her first Best Mandarin Female Singer award along with other nominations for Best Pop Vocal Album and Best Album Producer. In 2006, Chua moved to Taipei, and launched her own music production company Tangy Music.

=== 2007–2015: AsiaMuse Entertainment ===
In May 2007, Chua signed a recording deal with Taiwanese record label AsiaMuse Entertainment. The following month, she was featured as background vocals in Taiwanese singer Chang Chen-yue's song "Yearning Is a Kind of Sickness". In October of the same year, she released her sixth Mandarin album Goodbye & Hello which earned her two awards for Best Mandarin Female Singer and Best Album Producer out of seven nominations at the 19th Golden Melody Awards.

In 2008, Chua released her live album My Space which was nominated for Best Mandarin Female Singer at the 20th Golden Melody Awards.

In 2009, Chua released her seventh Mandarin album If You See Him. The album earned her four nominations including Best Mandarin Album, Best Mandarin Female Singer, Best Album Producer, and Best Composition at the 21st Golden Melody Awards. The album also won her a Hong Kong Top Sales Music Award for Ten Best Sales Releases Mandarin. In 2010, Chua produced Chinese singer Na Ying's album So What. In 2011, Chua released her eighth Mandarin album Sing It Out of Love. She made history of becoming the first person to win the Best Mandarin Female Singer award thrice at the 23rd Golden Melody Awards, along with seven other nominations for that album. In the same year, she released her fifth English album Just Say So.

In 2013, Chua released her ninth Mandarin album Angel vs. Devil, which earned her a nomination for Best Mandarin Female Singer at the 25th Golden Melody Awards. In the same year, she became one of the judges in the Chinese singing contest Sing My Song with Liu Huan, Yang Kun, and Emil Chau. In 2015, she came back as one of the judges in the second season of the show. In November of the same year, Chua released her tenth Mandarin album Aphasia which earned her six nominations at the 27th Golden Melody Awards. Subsequently, her contract with AsiaMuse Entertainment expired.

=== 2018–present: Return to Universal Music ===
In July 2017, Chua re-signed a recording deal with Universal Music. The following year, Chua released her eleventh Mandarin album Kisses for the World. The lead single from the album "The Will" earned her a Best Composition nomination at the 30th Golden Melody Awards. Chua also sang Nightglow, the official theme song for miHoYo's mobile ACG title Honkai Impact 3 second CG: Final Lesson.

In 2020, her concert tour "Kisses for the World" was announced. Tickets for the show sold out within 5 minutes but was postponed from May 2020 to January 2021 due to the ongoing COVID-19 pandemic. In August of the same year, Chua started writing songs for her twelfth Mandarin album Depart which was released in August 2021. At the 33rd Golden Melody Awards, Chua won four out of eight nominations, including three major awards for Best Female Mandarin Singer, Best Mandarin Album and Album of the Year for the album. The win for Best Female Mandarin Singer award made Chua the most awarded artist in the category, breaking her tie with A-mei, with four wins.

== Discography ==
=== Studio albums ===
==== Mandarin ====
- Tanya (1999)
- Remember (2000)
- I Do Believe (2001)
- Stranger (2003)
- Amphibian (2005)
- Goodbye & Hello (2007)
- If You See Him (2009)
- Sing It Out of Love (2011)
- Angel vs. Devil (2013)
- Aphasia (2015)
- Kisses for the World (2018)
- Depart (2021)
- Imperfect Us: Original Soundtrack (2024)

==== English ====
- Bored (1997)
- Luck (1999)
- Secret Lavender (2002)
- Jupiter (2003)
- Just Say So (2011)

== Awards and nominations ==
=== Asia Song Festival ===
Year	Category	Nominated work	Result	Ref.
1998	Best Composition	Tanya Chua for 'Hear Me'	Won	

=== Golden Melody Awards ===
Year	Category	Nominated work	Result	Ref.
2000	Best New Artist	Tanya Chua for Tanya	Nominated	
2002	Best Composition	Tanya Chua for "Wrong Number"	Nominated	
2002	Best Mandarin Female Singer	Tanya Chua for I Do Believe	Nominated	
2004	Best Mandarin Female Singer	Tanya Chua for Stranger	Nominated	
2006	Best Mandarin Album	Amphibian	Nominated	
2006	Producer of the Year, Album	Tanya Chua for Amphibian	Nominated	
2006	Best Mandarin Female Singer	Tanya Chua for Amphibian	Won	
2008	Song of the Year	"Darwin"	Nominated	
2008	Best Mandarin Album	Goodbye & Hello	Nominated	
2008	Best Composition	Tanya Chua for "Blank Space"	Nominated	
2008	Producer of the Year, Album	Tanya Chua for Goodbye & Hello	Won	
2008	Best Mandarin Female Singer	Tanya Chua for Goodbye & Hello	Won	
2009	Best Mandarin Female Singer	Tanya Chua for My Space	Nominated	
2010	Best Mandarin Album	If You See Him	Nominated	
2010	Best Composition	Tanya Chua for "Projectile"	Nominated	
2010	Producer of the Year, Album	Tanya Chua for If You See Him	Nominated	
2010	Best Mandarin Female Singer	Tanya Chua for If You See Him	Nominated	
2012	Song of the Year	"Sing It Out of Love"	Nominated	
2012	Best Mandarin Album	Sing It Out of Love	Nominated	
2012	Best Composition	Tanya Chua for "Sing It Out of Love"	Nominated	
2012	Best Music Arrangement	Tanya Chua, Doug Petty, Charlton Pettus, Brian Allen, Jamie Wollam for "Sing It Out of Love"	Nominated	
2012	Producer of the Year, Album	Tanya Chua for Sing It Out of Love	Nominated	
2012	Best Mandarin Female Singer	Tanya Chua for Sing It Out of Love	Won	
2014	Best Mandarin Female Singer	Tanya Chua for Angel vs. Devil	Nominated	
2016	Best Mandarin Album	Aphasia	Nominated	
2016	Best Composition	Tanya Chua for "Aphasia"	Nominated	
2016	Producer of the Year, Album	An Dong and Tanya Chua for Aphasia	Nominated	
2016	Best Mandarin Female Singer	Tanya Chua for Aphasia	Nominated	
2019	Best Composition	Tanya Chua for "The Will"	Nominated	
2022	Album of the Year	Depart	Won	
2022	Song of the Year	"Bluebirds"	Nominated	
2022	Best Mandarin Album	Depart	Won	
2022	Best Composition	Tanya Chua for "Bluebirds"	Nominated	
2022	Producer of the Year, Album	Tanya Chua for Depart	Nominated	
2022	Best Mandarin Female Singer	Tanya Chua for Depart	Won	
2022	Best Vocal Recording Album	Depart	Won	
