= Wild Hope =

Studio album by Mandy Moore
- Released: June 18, 2007
- Recorded: Allaire Studios; Woodstock, NY
- Genre: Folk pop
- Length: 46:14
- Label: Firm Music
- Producer: John Alagía

Mandy Moore chronology
Candy (2005)	Wild Hope (2007)	Amanda Leigh (2009)

Singles from Wild Hope
- 1. "Extraordinary" Released: April 10, 2007; 2. "Nothing That You Are" Released: September 20, 2007

Wild Hope is the fourth studio album by American singer-songwriter Mandy Moore, her first in four years since Coverage. It was released in digitally in Australia on June 18, 2007, and on June 19, 2007, by The Firm Music, a division of EMI USA. The Australian digital version includes the bonus track "Swept Away". Musically, it embraces folk-pop, indie folk, and alternative-rock, sound. The album was released in Australia physically on February 23, 2008. It is Moore's first album to be fully co-written by her.

The album debuted at number thirty on the US Billboard 200 with first-week sales of 25,000 copies. In February 2009, Wild Hope had sold 350,000 copies worldwide.

== Background ==
Moore began writing the album in 2004. She originally signed with Sire Records after leaving Epic Records in 2004 and released a single via her site titled "Hey!" which was written by James Renald, the co-writer and co-producer of her 2001 single "Cry". In early 2006, Moore posted her cover of Lori McKenna's 2003 song "Beautiful Man" on her MySpace profile and later informed her fans that she left Sire because of creative differences. In July 2006. Moore signed with The Firm, owned by EMI, and a U.K. magazine assumed after hearing the song "Slummin' In Paradise" that it would be the title of the album.

Moore collaborated with producer John Alagía on the album, who is known for working with Dave Matthews Band and Liz Phair, and has co-written an entire album for the first time: she co-wrote songs with a number of musicians, including Michelle Branch, Chantal Kreviazuk, Lori McKenna, Rachael Yamagata and indie folk pop duo The Weepies, all chronicled in a promotional video available for viewing on her official website. This is the first album that Moore co-wrote entirely and the first time she released songs that she co-wrote since "When I Talk to You" with songwriter and producer Matthew Hager, which appeared on her self-titled album, in 2001; a number of the songs are about her breakup with her ex-boyfriend, actor Zach Braff in 2006. The album's lead single "Extraordinary" was one of the songs she co-wrote with The Weepies, which premiered on her MySpace profile on January 29, 2007. On February 9, 2007, Moore posted the album's second single "Nothing That You Are" on her MySpace profile. Moore said making the album helped her cope with depression and self-discovery.

== Critical reception ==
Professional ratings
Review scores
Source	Rating
Absolutepunk.net	(7.8/10) link
AllMusic	link
Courant	(Favorable) link at the Wayback Machine (archived September 26, 2007)
Entertainment Weekly	(B) link
IGN	(7.4/10) link
Metromix	link
Monsters and Critics	(Favorable) link
Slant Magazine	link

The album received generally positive reviews from critics. Jane Magazine said that "Moore has turned into a sophisticated songwriter whose new sound fits cozily alongside that of Regina Spektor, Fiona Apple and Sarah McLachlan rather than all the pop tarts she used to be compared to." Billboard said that "Wild Hope is the gratifying sound of a singer finally finding her comfort zone. Gone is the sugary pop of Moore's early career, replaced instead by thoughtful musings on love and life...an album full of subtle, but undeniable hooks."

== Promotion ==
Moore filmed a documentary for Oxygen called I am Mandy Moore that chronicled the writing and concept of her album Wild Hope. She also did "one-off" gigs promoting her album. The most popular is the MSN concert where Moore performed all songs off her album including three of her older songs that were "Help Me", "Moonshadow" and "Candy". Moore also went on tour to help promote the album.

In December 2017, Wild Hope was re-released and made available for digital download and streaming.

== Commercial performance ==
Wild Hope debuted on the US Billboard 200 at number 30, selling 25,000 copies on its first week. It is Moore's third highest debuting album, falling short of her third studio album Coverage (2003), which debuted at number fourteen. The album also reached number nine on US The Top Internet albums. It spent a total of seven weeks on the Billboard 200. Wild Hope had sold 350,000 copies worldwide as of February 2009. In US the album had sold 109,000 copies by June 2009.

== Track listing ==
All songs produced by John Alagía.

No.	Title	Writer(s)	Length
1.	"Extraordinary"	Mandy Moore, Deb Talan, Steve Tannen	2:54
2.	"All Good Things"	Moore, Talan, Tannen	2:53
3.	"Slummin' in Paradise" (featuring Jason Mraz on background vocals)	Moore, James Renald	4:12
4.	"Most of Me"	Moore, Lori McKenna	4:47
5.	"Few Days Down"	Moore, Talan, Tannen	3:23
6.	"Can't You Just Adore Her?"	Moore, McKenna	3:55
7.	"Looking Forward to Looking Back"	Moore, Talan, Tannen	3:13
8.	"Wild Hope"	Moore, Talan, Tannen	2:59
9.	"Nothing That You Are"	Moore, Renald	4:28
10.	"Latest Mistake"	Moore, McKenna	4:08
11.	"Ladies' Choice"	Moore, Chris Holmes, Rachael Yamagata	4:56
12.	"Gardenia"	Moore, Chantal Kreviazuk	4:27
Total length:			46:14

Australian digital edition
No.	Title	Writer(s)	Length
13.	"Swept Away"	Moore, McKenna	4:34
Total length:			50:48

Japanese edition
No.	Title	Writer(s)	Length
13.	"All Good Things" (Naked / Raw Version)	Moore, Hem	2:53
Total length:			49:07

Target bonus tracks
No.	Title	Writer(s)	Length
13.	"Could've Been Watching You"	Moore, McKenna	3:19
14.	"All Good Things" (Naked / Raw Version)	Moore, Hem	2:53
Total length:			52:26

Walmart digital store bonus tracks
No.	Title	Writer(s)	Length
13.	"Umbrella"	Kuk Harrell, Terius "The-Dream" Nash, Christopher "Tricky" Stewart	4:41
14.	"Candy" (Acoustic Version)	Denise Rich, Dave Katz, Denny Kleiman	4:46
15.	"Little Drummer Boy"	Harry Simeone, Katherine Kennicott Davis, Henry Onorati	3:16
Total length:			58:57

== Personnel ==
- Mandy Moore: Main vocals
- Brett and Steve Dennen, Tom Freund, Jason Mraz, Sara Watkins, Steve Wilson: Background vocals
- John Alagía: Acoustic guitars, organ, piano, percussion
- Daniel Clark: Organ, Fender Rhodes, Wurlitzer, acoustic piano
- Mark Goldenberg: Organ, mandolin, E-Bow, electric and acoustic guitars, tamboura, ukulele
- Kevin Saleem: Acoustic, electric and slide guitars, Hammond organ, drum programming
- Doug Derryberry: Electric guitars, bouzouki
- Deb Talan: Acoustic guitars, Wurlitzer, background vocals
- Rachael Yamagata: Clarinet, French horn, piano, sampling, background vocals
- Stewart Meyers: Bass
- Matt Johnson: Drums, percussion
- Brian Ashley Jones: Drums

== Charts ==
Chart performance for Wild Hope
Chart (2007)	Peak position
Canadian Albums (Nielsen SoundScan)	84
US Billboard 200	30
US Digital Albums (Billboard)	9

== Singles ==
1. "Extraordinary"
2. "Nothing That You Are" (Promo only)
3. "All Good Things" (Australia Radio single only)

=== Unreleased tracks ===
- "Changed My Mind" (McKenna, Moore)
- "Shades" (Moore, Renald)
- "Never Again" (Moore, Renald)

=== Mandy Moore Soundcheck (Wal-Mart Exclusive) ===
- "All Good Things" [Original Performance Series] – 2:53
- "Looking Forward To Looking Back" [Original Performance Series] [Video]
- "Interview From Soundcheck" [Video]
