= Aphasia (album) =

Studio album by Tanya Chua
- Released: 13 November 2015
- Genre: Mandopop
- Length: 39:32
- Language: Mandarin
- Label: AsiaMuse

Tanya Chua chronology
Angel vs. Devil (2013)	Aphasia (2015)	Kisses for the World (2018)

Aphasia (Chinese: 失語者; pinyin: shīyǔ zhě) is the tenth Mandarin-language studio album by Singaporean singer-songwriter Tanya Chua, released on 13 November 2015 by AsiaMuse Entertainment. Pre-orders for the album began on 28 October. Chua worked with her long-time lyricist Xiaohan and Chinese composer and producer An Dong for the album which is noted for its experimental and electronic elements, transcending the theme of her previous releases composed of guitar-driven healing ballads. The meaning behind the album title aphasia refers to the neurological disorder that impairs speech, reading, or writing.

At the 27th Golden Melody Awards, Chua received six nominations including Best Mandarin Album and Best Female Mandarin Singer for the album.

== Background and production ==
In 2013, following the release of her ninth Mandarin studio album Angel vs. Devil, Chua became one of the judges in the CCTV-3 singing contest Sing My Song for the first and second seasons. She met with Chinese composer and producer, An Dong, who also produced the TV show to collaborate with the album's production. The two have been through a lot of breakdowns, communicating initially through WeChat and switching to e-mail conversations when matters get serious. Chua claimed to have been criticized by An for "not being professional enough, advanced and refined", which caused her to crumble and question her own abilities. She had been working independently on her previous materials and found it difficult to collaborate with other people, but found her meeting with An a "cosmic arrangement".

According to Chua, the album represents the increasingly intelligent "bow-down" human lives that have become more "aphasic", reliant on the internet, addicted to technology, indifferent to human connections, and unable to express emotions. She decided to employ experimental and electronic forms of music which were not her forte to act as a metaphor, representing isolation which has become the epitome of modern life. For the album, Chua abandoned the guitar and worked on arranging music through computer software for the first time, mentioning that it was possible to arrange multiple versions of a song through the computer and it was a dark hole she fell into. She flew to Taipei, San Francisco, London, and Paris for two years to complete the album, which she called her most "crashing" yet. For a more forward and avant-garde musical style and concept, Chua also invited musicians from China, the United States, the United Kingdom, Germany, and Japan to assist with the songwriting, production, and arrangement. She personally took the album master to mastering engineer John Davis who worked with Lana Del Rey for post-production.

== Release ==
On 28 October 2015, Chua released the album's pre-order teaser on her YouTube channel, and on 6 November, she released her first single from the album, "Strange Species", along with the music video which was directed by Taiwanese director Chen Hung-i (陳宏一) and was shot in Paris to capture the loneliness, fragility, indulgence, and detachment of the collective emotions in a busy urban night scene.

On 12 November, she released the lyric video of her title track, "Aphasia" and on the 13th, she held a press conference in Beijing to officially release the album. The music video for "Aphasia" deals with two intense emotions depicting the sad and fragile state of aphasia. It was released on the 18th and was directed by Taiwanese music video director Shockley Huang (黃中平).

== Track listing ==
All tracks are composed by Tanya Chua and written by Xiaohan.

No.	Title	Length
1.	"Strange Species" (異類的同類)	4:03
2.	"Best Way to Die" (活著是最好的死亡)	4:13
3.	"Aphasia" (失語者)	3:41
4.	"Film" (菲林)	4:19
5.	"Enigma" (謎)	3:53
6.	"Cat and Mouse" (貓鼠遊戲)	2:59
7.	"Can I Help You Sir?" (先生有事嗎？)	3:13
8.	"Peep Show" (偷窺秀)	4:01
9.	"One Carat" (一克拉)	4:30
10.	"Glitter" (粉末)	4:35
Total length:		39:26

== Awards and nominations ==
27th Golden Melody Awards, Taiwan – 2016
Award	Nomination	Result
Best Mandarin Album	Aphasia	Nominated
Best Female Mandarin Singer	Tanya Chua	Nominated
Best Composer	"Aphasia" (失語者) – Tanya Chua	Nominated
Best Album Producer – Vocal Category	Aphasia – Tanya Chua, An Dong	Nominated
Best Arrangement – Vocal Category	"Best Way to Die" – Chang Shilei, An Dong	Nominated
Best Vocal Recording Album – Technical Category	Aphasia	Nominated
