= Meghan Toohey =

American singer

Meghan Toohey is a multi-instrumentalist, songwriter, singer, producer, and performer from Massachusetts who resides in New York City. After fronting a Boston-based band called The So and So's, Toohey moved to LA and switched her focus to playing guitar for other artists (The Weepies, Lenka, Lucy Schwartz) and working as a music producer (Vivek Shraya, Garrison Starr, Margaret Cho). In 2016, Toohey began playing guitar for the Broadway musical Waitress, written by Sara Bareilles. She toured with Manolo Garcia in Spain during October 2018.

== Early life ==
A Chelmsford, Massachusetts native, Meghan Toohey started writing music at the age of 5 when her parents bought her a playback organ for her birthday. She is the daughter of an English teacher and a music teacher, which contributed to her love of melody and lyric.

== Education ==
In Boston, Meghan Toohey attended Berklee College of Music where she was awarded the Songwriting Achievement Award and her song "This Ride" was selected to be recorded by Eddie Kramer that subsequently landed her a spec deal with Sony at the age of 20. "This Ride" was selected out of 60 other songs submitted to record, mix, and master.

== The So and So's ==
The So and So's were formed in 2003 by Boston multi-instrumentalist, songwriter, producer and performer Meghan Toohey. The So and So's were led by Toohey – who wrote all the group's songs – and in addition to Toohey on lead vocals, lead guitar, and Hammond organ, the band consisted of Jay Barclay on guitar and vocals, Rodrigo Monterrey on bass and vocals and Chris Hobbick on drums.

In 2003, the band recorded an 8-song EP titled "The Silver Sessions" which was made available at its concerts and via download on its website. In 2004, the band released "Give Me Drama" containing 8 new tracks and 4 previously recorded tracks from "The Silver Sessions" EP.

On September 29, 2004 The So and So's and "Give Me Drama" received a 2004 Boston Music Award for Local Debut Album of the year.

== The Cold and Lovely ==
Toohey formed the Los Angeles-based alternative rock band The Cold and Lovely with bassist Nicole Fiorentino (The Smashing Pumpkins / Veruca Salt). While volunteering at the Rock Camp for Girls in Los Angeles, the duo connected with Patty Schemel (Hole, Imperial Teen, Hits So Hard Documentary), who, after listening to the demos, offered up her drums skills and became part of the band.

When asked to categorize the kind of music she's making with The Cold And Lovely, Toohey responded "For me, the sound of the band sort of grew out of the fact that I was playing with a bunch of "folk" artists and singer songwriters. As much as I love the artists I work with, I felt like I wasn't really able to branch out from getting those kind of gigs and playing a certain style of guitar. I have always really been drawn to more ambient rock and pop bands like Radiohead, PJ Harvey, The Cure, My Bloody Valentine, and this project gave me a chance to play with those sounds and play the kind of music that I really love."

The band released its debut album in June 2012 following a successful PledgeMusic campaign. According to Toohey, "This record is a return to my own music, something I have been waiting for the right time to jump back into." The first single "Not With Me" was made available on the Cold and Lovely website on April 24, 2012. The album features guest appearances by Brian Aubert of Silversun Pickups, Kat Turner, and Jeff Klein.

On September 24, 2013, The Cold and Lovely released its sophomore record entitled "Ellis Bell EP". A deluxe version of Ellis Bell containing two new tracks and a remix of the song Ellis Bell by Dan Konopka of OK Go was made available in June 2014.

The band released "What Will I Become" on January 20, 2015.

== The Weepies ==
Meghan Toohey also plays guitar and other instruments both in studio and on tour with Nettwerk artists The Weepies, including their most recent release/tour for Be My Thrill which debuted at number 34 on the U.S. Billboard 200 chart.

== Touring ==
In 2009, Toohey finished a lengthy US and Australian tour with Lenka.

Meghan Toohey has also toured extensively as a multi-instrumentalist with artists including:

- Saw Doctors
- The Weepies
- Schuyler Fisk
- Lori McKenna
- The Damnwells
- DJ Samantha Ronson

== Production and other work ==
In addition to her current work as a songwriter and Broadway guitarist, Toohey is also focusing on producing artists. She recently produced an all-female version of Jesus Christ Superstar, which featured performances by Cynthia Erivo and Shoshana Bean. She has produced for artists including Rachael Cantu, Vivek Shraya and Garrison Starr. She also produced a track off of the grammy nominated album Cho Dependent by Margaret Cho. Meghan Toohey scored her second film and produced Canadian artist Vivek Shraya's sophomore release in 2010. She also licensed several of her songs for film (including the original score for "A Finished Life" on HERE TV) and TV (ABC's Private Practice) and completed original music for a news network based out of London. During the 2000s, Meghan performed all over the globe with her band The So and So's, and worked with producers including Victor Van Vugt and Eddie Kramer.

In 2015 Meghan collaborated with long time writing partner Michelle Featherstone on a release of Children's Music, Toozigoots". The CD aims to introduce developmental transitions to kids through a vibrant collection of upbeat songs.

Meghan is on the executive team of Rock And Roll Camp for Girls Los Angeles where she has volunteered since 2012.

== Discography ==
| Year | Title | Artist |
|---|---|---|
| 2020 | Butch | Meg Toohey |
| 2015 | What Will I Become | The Cold and Lovely |
| 2013 | Ellis Bell EP | The Cold and Lovely |
| 2012 | The Cold and Lovely | The Cold and Lovely |
| 2010 | Be My Thrill | The Weepies |
| 2008 | Hideaway | The Weepies |
| 2006 | Say I Am You | The Weepies |
| 2004 | Give Me Drama | The So and So's |
| 2003 | The Silver Sessions EP | The So and So's |
| 2001 | Eight So Low | Meghan Toohey |
| 2000 | Romantic Blunder #4 | Meghan Toohey |
