= Depart =

Studio album by Tanya Chua
- Released: 13 August 2021
- Genre: Mandopop
- Length: 41:20
- Language: Mandarin
- Label: Universal Music
- Producer: Tanya Chua

Tanya Chua chronology
Kisses for the World (2018)	Depart (2021)

Depart is the twelfth Mandarin-language studio album by Singaporean singer and songwriter Tanya Chua, released by Universal Music on 13 August 2021. She collaborated with Carla Bruni and Ayanga, and also invited world-class composer Ricky Ho to produce and arrange the music.

At the 33rd Golden Melody Awards, Chua was awarded the Best Female Mandarin Singer, Best Mandarin Album, Album of the Year and Best Vocal Album Recording for Depart, among eight other nominations.

== Background and recording ==
On 30 January 2021, Chua sang a new song, "Ex-Love Song" during the encore of her "Kisses for the World" concert tour held in Taipei Arena, Taipei, Taiwan. The song appeared on Track 6 in the album. On 22 June 2021, Chua posted a photo of herself approaching an open door in a backdrop of a rocky mountain on her social media accounts, mentioning Wu Qing-feng. It served as the first teaser to her lead single "Depart". According to Chua, she was "idling and feeling at a loss" during her isolation in Taipei when the COVID-19 pandemic broke out, so she took the time to write music about what was happening to the world. She drew inspiration from nature documentaries and classical music.

The album was recorded at Chua's home recording studio, skipping the convenience of electronic arrangements and returning to "unplugged" music, focusing on the timbre and quality of instruments and vocals. Chua single-handedly composed, arranged, and played the acoustic guitar for the album which she did for the first time. She also invited Taiwanese lyricist David Ke (葛大為), Singaporean lyricist Xiaohan, and Hong Kong lyricist Chow Yiu-fai (周耀輝) to help with the lyrics. Chua wrote over 30 songs for the album.

== Release ==
On 8 July 2021, Chua released her single "Depart", three years after her eleventh studio album Kisses for the World, and followed up with the music video a week after. The song employed minimalistic orchestration with only a guitar and a string quartet. She followed with the second single "Bluebirds" on 29 July 2021, in cooperation with Ricky Ho and the Bulgarian National Radio Symphony Orchestra.

On 6 August 2021, Chua released her third single "Photographs" in collaboration with Italian-French singer, model, and France's former first lady Carla Bruni. The song is in English and Mandarin with Bruni singing a few lines in Mandarin, with guidance from Chua.

On 12 August 2021, Chua released her fourth single "Romanticism", followed by the release of her full album Depart the following day.

== Track listing ==
All tracks are composed and produced by Tanya Chua.

No.	Title	Writer(s)	Length
1.	"Bluebirds"	Tanya Chua	5:35
2.	"Breakdown"	Xiaohan	3:53
3.	"Into The Wild (featuring Ayanga)"	Chow Yiu-fai (周耀輝)	3:56
4.	"Depart" (出走)	Chua	4:16
5.	"Those Little Things" (那些小事情)	Chua	4:23
6.	"Ex-Love Song" (舊情歌)	Chua	3:44
7.	"Everything of Everything" (全部的所有)	Chua	3:15
8.	"Photographs (featuring Carla Bruni)"	Chua	3:54
9.	"Romanticism" (讓浪漫作主)	David Ke (葛大為)	4:10
10.	"Om Tara"	Chua	4:14
Total length:			41:20

== Awards and nominations ==
33rd Golden Melody Awards, Taiwan – 2022
Award	Nomination	Result
Album of the Year – Vocal category	Depart	Won
Song of the Year – Vocal category	"Bluebirds"	Nominated
Best Mandarin Album – Vocal category	Depart	Won
Best Composition – Vocal category	"Bluebirds"	Nominated
Best Lyrics – Vocal category	Chow Yiu-fai for "Into the Wild"	Nominated
Producer of the Year, Album – Vocal category	Depart	Nominated
Best Mandarin Female Singer – Vocal category	Depart	Won
Best Vocal Recording Album – Technical category	Depart	Won
