= The Weepies =

American singer-songwriters

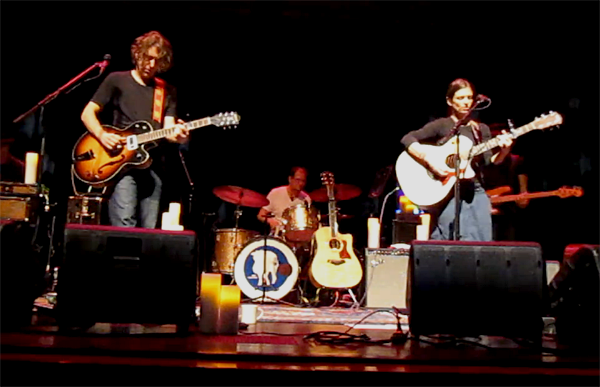
- The Weepies performing in Grand Rapids, Michigan in November 2010.

Background information
- Origin: Cambridge, Massachusetts, U.S.
- Genres: Indie, folk rock, acoustic rock
- Years active: 2001–2022
- Label: Nettwerk
- Members: Deb Talan; Steve Tannen
- Website: theweepies.com

The Weepies were an American indie pop-folk band consisting of singer-songwriters Steve Tannen and Deb Talan. Their music has been described as "subtly intoxicating folk-pop".

== History ==
=== Formation and early years (2001–2005) ===
In 2001, Talan and Tannen were individually active as singer-songwriters but mutual fans of each other's music; Tannen played Talan's album "constantly", even singing along in harmony, while Talan in turn was captivated by and had "formed a kind of a relationship" with Tannen's music. After eventually meeting at one of Tannen's shows at Club Passim in Cambridge, Massachusetts, they quickly discovered a deep musical bond and began playing music together. According to Talan, the band's name

...came about from a few different sources, but one was, you know, those sort of old movies that were called weepies, where you could basically be guaranteed that if you needed a good cry, you could go and see one of these and bring your hanky and have a good time. And we want to be able to provide that for people. We want to make music that touches them and moves them in that way, the place where tears come from, for joy and for sorrow.

The Weepies' first album Happiness was released at Club Passim on November 29, 2003, and though they were unsigned by a label it sold over 10,000 copies.

=== Nettwerk (2005–2011) ===
In 2005, The Weepies recorded a second album, Say I Am You, in the bedroom of their home in Pasadena, California; the occasional motorist can be heard passing by in the background of some of the tracks. In May 2005, after a sold-out show at The Living Room in New York City, The Weepies were approached by Nettwerk Records and signed by the label later that year. The album was released digitally in December of that year and physically on March 7, 2006. By February 2006, the album hit number one the iTunes Store list of most-downloaded folk albums in eight countries, with the single "World Spins Madly On" also topping the list of most-downloaded folk songs in the United States. Snow Patrol's Gary Lightbody nominated the album for the Shortlist Music Prize, awarded to the year's best album released in the United States selling fewer than 500,000 copies, though it failed to reach the ten-album shortlist.

The band played 180 shows in 2006 and toured Europe for the first time, playing at Oxegen, T in the Park, and the Hurricane Festival.

In 2007, the band collaborated with Mandy Moore, playing and writing on her new album, Wild Hope.

The Weepies recorded their third album, Hideaway, in a small rental house in Topanga, California. Released in April 2008, it sold 14,000 copies in its first week and was the band's first entrance on the Billboard Top 200, charting at number 31.

The Weepies' fourth full-length album, Be My Thrill, was released in August 2010, and featured Colbie Caillat in back-up vocals on the track "I Was Made for Sunny Days." The album topped the Top 200 Billboard Charts at No. 34 and remained at No. 3 on Billboard's Top Folk albums for nine weeks. The band's subsequent supporting tour had 26 sold-out shows across the United States.

=== Post-Nettwerk (2011–2022) ===
After three records with Nettwerk, the band departed the label on good terms in 2011. According to their Twitter and Facebook accounts, they have been recording independently and gearing up for additional touring.

On December 16, 2013, it was announced on the band's Facebook page that Deb Talan had been diagnosed with stage 3 breast cancer. After Talan underwent both chemotherapy and surgery, the band's Facebook page announced on June 10, 2014, that she was in remission. The group then announced a new album entitled Sirens, which was released in April 2015. In February 2015 they released the theme song, "Sirens". The full album was officially released on April 28, 2015.

After finalizing their divorce on New Year's Day 2020, Talan and Tannen played their final shows together in January 2022.

== Licensing ==
Many songs by The Weepies have been licensed for use in films, television shows, and advertisements, including the films Sex and the City, Morning Glory, Adam, and Prom, as well as episodes of Grey's Anatomy, Everwood, One Tree Hill, Scrubs, Pretty Little Liars, The Riches, How I Met Your Mother, Gossip Girl, Kyle XY, Life Unexpected, Up All Night, The Fosters and Sense8. The band was prominently featured during an episode of Dirty Sexy Money with an on-screen performance as an episode subplot. Songs by the band have also appeared in advertising campaigns, including spots for PBS Kids, Old Navy and JCPenney, as well as a campaign advertisement for Barack Obama's 2008 presidential campaign.

== Band members ==
Talan and Tannen have at various times been supported in recording and touring by Meghan Toohey, Catie Curtis, Brad Gordon, Jonny Flaugher, and Frank Lenz.

Talan and Tannen got married in 2007 and had their first son in October of that year. They went on to have two more sons. Their divorce was finalized on New Year's Day 2020.

== Discography ==
=== Studio albums ===
- Happiness (2003)
- Say I Am You (2006)
- Hideaway (2008)
- Be My Thrill (2010)
- Sirens (2015)

=== EPs ===
- Live Session EP (iTunes Exclusive) (2006)

=== Tours ===
- Say I Am You Tour (2006)
- Be My Thrill Tour (2010)
- An Acoustic Evening with the Weepies Tour (2011)
- Sirens (2015)
- The Weepies: Completely Acoustic and Alone (2016–2017)
- The Weepies: Hideaway 10 Year Anniversary Tour (2018)
- The Weepies: Holiday Acoustic tour (2018)
