= Steve Tannen =

American musician and singer-songwriter

- Born: Steven J. Tannen; 1968 (age 57–58)
- Origin: New York City, U.S.
- Genres: Indie Folk, folk-pop, folk rock
- Occupation: Singer-songwriter
- Instruments: Vocals, guitar
- Years active: 2000–present
- Label: Nettwerk
- Website: theweepies.com

Steven J. "Steve" Tannen (born 1968) is an American singer-songwriter. He is best known for being in the folk-pop duo The Weepies.

== Early life and career ==
Tannen was born in New York City, but grew up in Australia and Canada in addition to New York. He started performing at an early age and learned music at home. He is the grandson of magician Louis Tannen and the brother of songwriter Greg Tannen and screenwriter Robert Tannen.

Steve graduated from Mamaroneck High School. He received a degree in English from Stanford University. Tannen worked as a production assistant in Hollywood, becoming a script reader and assistant to film director Norman Jewison. He interned at radio station KCRW, and then moved to Colorado to work for the Computational and Information Systems Laboratory (CISL) at the National Center for Atmospheric Research (NCAR). He left NCAR after a year and worked odd jobs around the US, developing a personal mix of folk and rock.

He returned to New York and, with the help from former Suzanne Vega guitarist Jon Gordon, started a rock and roll project. This turned into his debut album "Big Señorita" which was chosen as one of Performing Songwriter Magazine's Top 12 Independent Releases of 2001. In 2001, while touring behind Big Senorita, Tannen met his future wife and musical partner Deb Talan at a show at Club Passim in Cambridge, Massachusetts. His second solo CD "Stopped at a Green Light" was released in September 2003; this was quickly followed by the first Weepies album Happiness in December of that same year.

In addition to The Weepies' albums, Talan and Tannen collaborated with singer/actress Mandy Moore on her 2007 album Wild Hope. Together, they wrote and recorded five songs with Mandy – the single "Extraordinary," the title track "Wild Hope," "All Good Things," "Few Days Down" and "Looking Forward to Looking Back."

Steve is also a member of The Tannen Brothers, in which he plays with his brother Greg Tannen.

== Discography ==
| Year | Title | Label |
|---|---|---|
| 2000 | Big Señorita | Independent |
| 2003 | Stopped at a Green Light | Independent |
