= Deb Talan =

American singer-songwriter

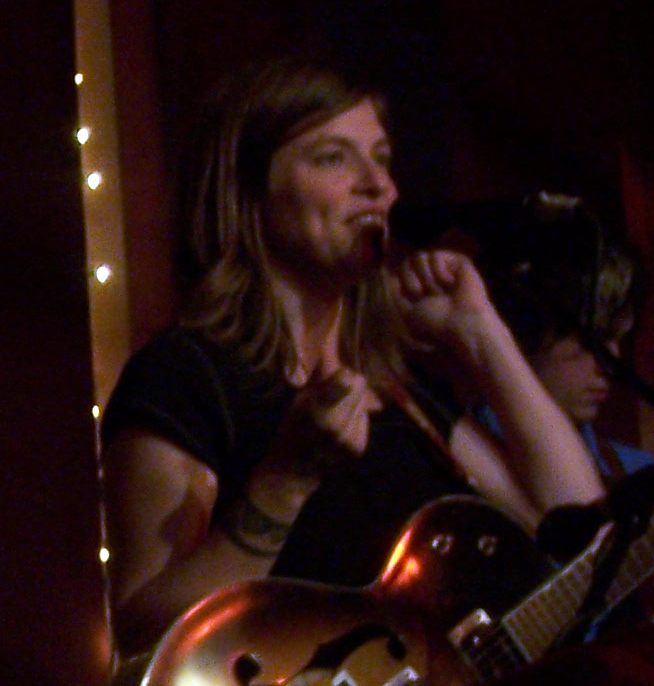
- Talan performing in NYC on April 22, 2006.

Background information
- Born: Deborah Ruth Talan; January 27, 1968 (age 58)
- Origin: Massachusetts, US
- Genres: Indie folk, pop-folk
- Occupation: Singer-songwriter
- Instruments: Vocals, guitar
- Years active: 1994–present
- Labels: Nettwerk, Happyhead Music
- Website: theweepies.com

Deborah Ruth "Deb" Talan (born January 27, 1968) is an American singer-songwriter. She is best known for being part of the folk-pop duo the Weepies.

== Early life and career ==
Born in western Massachusetts, Talan grew up in the small town of Pelham, Massachusetts and attended Amherst Regional High School (ARHS). She later attended Brown University, where she was a member of the Chattertocks, Brown's oldest all-female a cappella group, before moving to Oregon, where she was a member of Hummingfish, a Portland band, for six years.

Talan's recurring lyrical motifs include celestial objects, birds, nature, and various historical figures (e.g., Marc Chagall in "Painting By Chagall," Amelia Earhart in "Thinking Amelia," and Vincent van Gogh in "Vincent").

Jonathan Lethem’s novel Motherless Brooklyn inspired Talan to write "Tell Your Story Walking". This song appears on the 2002 album Songs Inspired by Literature (Chapter One), a benefit of the organization Artists for Literacy. "Tell Your Story Walking" was the winner of Artists for Literacy’s 2002 songwriting contest.

In addition to the Weepies' albums, (Steve Tannen is the other half of the duo), Talan and Tannen collaborated with singer/actress Mandy Moore on her 2007 album Wild Hope. Together, they wrote and recorded five songs with Mandy — the single "Extraordinary," the title track "Wild Hope," "All Good Things," "Few Days Down" and "Looking Forward to Looking Back."

"Forgiven" played over the closing credits of the 2001 film Lovely & Amazing.

== Discography ==
Year	Title	Label
1997	Songs for a Misfit Heart	Independent
2000	Something Burning	Happyhead Music
2001	Sincerely	Happyhead Music
2003	A Bird Flies Out	Independent
2017	Lucky Girl	Nettwerk
2025	I Thought I Saw You	OneRPM
